= 1766 in Wales =

- Centuries: 16th; 17th; 18th; 19th; 20th
- Decades: 1740s; 1750s; 1760s; 1770s; 1780s
- See also: List of years in Wales; Timeline of Welsh history 1766 in Great Britain Scotland Elsewhere

This article is about the particular significance of the year 1766 to Wales and its people.

== Incumbents ==
- Lord Lieutenant of Anglesey - Sir Nicholas Bayly, 2nd Baronet
- Lord Lieutenant of Brecknockshire and Lord Lieutenant of Monmouthshire – Thomas Morgan
- Lord Lieutenant of Caernarvonshire - Thomas Wynn
- Lord Lieutenant of Cardiganshire – Wilmot Vaughan, 1st Earl of Lisburne
- Lord Lieutenant of Carmarthenshire – George Rice
- Lord Lieutenant of Denbighshire - Richard Myddelton
- Lord Lieutenant of Flintshire - Sir Roger Mostyn, 5th Baronet
- Lord Lieutenant of Glamorgan – Other Windsor, 4th Earl of Plymouth
- Lord Lieutenant of Merionethshire - William Vaughan
- Lord Lieutenant of Montgomeryshire – Henry Herbert, 1st Earl of Powis
- Lord Lieutenant of Pembrokeshire – Sir William Owen, 4th Baronet
- Lord Lieutenant of Radnorshire – Howell Gwynne (until 12 July); Edward Harley, 4th Earl of Oxford and Earl Mortimer (from 16 July)
- Bishop of Bangor – John Egerton
- Bishop of Llandaff – John Ewer
- Bishop of St Asaph – Richard Newcome
- Bishop of St Davids – Samuel Squire (until 7 May); Robert Lowth (from 14 June); Charles Moss (from 30 November)

== Events ==
- 19 February - Thomas Kymer is granted an Act of Parliament allowing him to construct the Kidwelly and Llanelly Canal.
- 12 May - Sir Roger Mostyn, 5th Baronet, marries Margaret, daughter of Rev Hugh Wynn and heiress to the Bodysgallen estate.
- July - Maurice Morgann becomes an under-secretary to the Earl of Shelburne, then Secretary of State for the South. In November he is made secretary of the Province of New Jersey.
- 12 November - John, Lord Mountstuart marries Charlotte Jane, granddaughter of Thomas Windsor, 1st Viscount Windsor.
- unknown date - The Welsh-language periodical Yr Awstralydd is launched by William Meirion Evans in Australia.

== Arts and literature ==
=== New books ===
==== English language ====
- Evan Lloyd - The Powers of the Pen
- Anna Williams - Miscellanies in Prose and Verse

==== Welsh language ====
- David Jones of Trefriw (ed.) - Cydymaith Diddan
- Dafydd Jones - Salmau Dafydd
- Lloffion Prydyddiaeth ... Mr. Rees Prichard
- John Roberts (Siôn Robert Lewis) - Drych y Cristion
- William Williams Pantycelyn - Ffarwel Weledig, part 2

=== Music ===
- Elis Roberts - Oliffernes a Jiwdath

=== Paintings ===
- Richard Wilson - Meleager and Atalanta

== Births ==
- March - William Turner, industrialist (died 1853)
- 10 November - John Jones (Jac Glan-y-gors), satirical poet and radical pamphleteer (died 1821)
- 6 December - Robert Williams (Robert ap Gwilym Ddu), poet (died 1850)
- 18 December - Charles Lloyd, dissenting minister and schoolmaster (died 1829)
- 25 December - Christmas Evans, preacher (died 1838)
- unknown date
  - Martha Llwyd, hymnodist (died 1845)
  - Henry Parry, clergyman and antiquarian (died 1854)

== Deaths ==
- 1 January - James Francis Edward Stuart, 77, nominally Prince of Wales from his birth until 1701
- 19 January - Wilmot Vaughan, 3rd Viscount Lisburne, landowner
- 30 January - John Jeffreys, 59, politician
- June - Evan Edwards, 32, harpist
- 7 May - Samuel Squire, 51/52, Bishop of St Davids
- 17 November - Morgan Morgan, 78, Welsh-born American colonist (in America)
- date unknown - Milbourn Bloom, independent minister
