= 1764 in Wales =

- Centuries: 16th; 17th; 18th; 19th; 20th
- Decades: 1740s; 1750s; 1760s; 1770s; 1780s
- See also: List of years in Wales; Timeline of Welsh history 1764 in Great Britain Scotland Elsewhere

Events from the year 1764 in Wales.

== Incumbents ==
- Lord Lieutenant of Anglesey – Sir Nicholas Bayly, 2nd Baronet
- Lord Lieutenant of Brecknockshire and Lord Lieutenant of Monmouthshire – Thomas Morgan
- Lord Lieutenant of Caernarvonshire – Thomas Wynn
- Lord Lieutenant of Cardiganshire – Wilmot Vaughan, 1st Earl of Lisburne
- Lord Lieutenant of Carmarthenshire – George Rice
- Lord Lieutenant of Denbighshire – Richard Myddelton
- Lord Lieutenant of Flintshire – Sir Roger Mostyn, 5th Baronet
- Lord Lieutenant of Glamorgan – Other Windsor, 4th Earl of Plymouth
- Lord Lieutenant of Merionethshire – William Vaughan
- Lord Lieutenant of Montgomeryshire – Henry Herbert, 1st Earl of Powis
- Lord Lieutenant of Pembrokeshire – Sir William Owen, 4th Baronet
- Lord Lieutenant of Radnorshire – Howell Gwynne
- Bishop of Bangor – John Egerton
- Bishop of Llandaff – John Ewer
- Bishop of St Asaph – Richard Newcome
- Bishop of St Davids – Samuel Squire

== Events ==
- January – South Wales industrialist Anthony Bacon succeeds John Wilkes as MP for Aylesbury.
- February – Thomas Nowell, the new principal of St Mary Hall, Oxford, marries Sarah Munday, daughter of the Mayor of Oxford.
- 21 June – Humphrey Edwards, physician, begins a voyage round the world as physician on HMS Tamar.

== Arts and literature ==
=== New books ===
==== English language ====
- Rowland Jones – The Origin of Language and Nations
- Gabriel Powell – Survey of Gower

==== Welsh language ====
- Evan Evans (Ieuan Fardd) – Some Specimens of the Poetry of the Antient Welsh Bards
- David Powell – Sail yr Athrawiaeth Gatholic
- Morgan Rhys – Golwg o Ben Nebo

=== Music ===
- 31 March – "Jones" performs on the Welsh harp at a benefit concert in Dublin, "in the true Spirit and Taste peculiar to the Genius of his Country".

== Births ==
- 29 April – Ann Hatton ("Ann of Swansea"), English novelist (d. 1838)
- 20 June – Thomas Evans (Tomos Glyn Cothi), first Unitarian minister in Wales (d. 1833)
- 20 July – Sir Robert Williams, 9th Baronet, politician (died 1830)
- 27 July – John Thelwall, English-born orator, writer, political reformer, journalist and poet (died 1834)
- date unknown
  - William Crawshay I, ironmaster (d. 1834)
  - Robert Waithman, lord mayor of London (d. 1833)

== Deaths ==
- 17 March – Uvedale Tomkins Price, politician, Steward of the Courts for Denbigh, 78
- 18 June – Christmas Samuel, minister and writer, 90
- 22 June – Sir John Philipps, 6th Baronet, 63
- 26 September – Joseph Harris, Assay-master of the Royal Mint, 60
- October – Richard Lathrop, bookseller and printer, age unknown
- date unknown – John Richards, preacher and poet, about 44
