= 1767 in Wales =

- Centuries: 16th; 17th; 18th; 19th; 20th
- Decades: 1740s; 1750s; 1760s; 1770s; 1780s
- See also: List of years in Wales; Timeline of Welsh history 1767 in Great Britain Scotland Elsewhere

Events from the year 1767 in Wales.

== Incumbents ==
- Lord Lieutenant of Anglesey - Sir Nicholas Bayly, 2nd Baronet
- Lord Lieutenant of Brecknockshire and Lord Lieutenant of Monmouthshire – Thomas Morgan
- Lord Lieutenant of Caernarvonshire - Thomas Wynn
- Lord Lieutenant of Cardiganshire – Wilmot Vaughan, 1st Earl of Lisburne
- Lord Lieutenant of Carmarthenshire – George Rice
- Lord Lieutenant of Denbighshire - Richard Myddelton
- Lord Lieutenant of Flintshire - Sir Roger Mostyn, 5th Baronet
- Lord Lieutenant of Glamorgan – Other Windsor, 4th Earl of Plymouth
- Lord Lieutenant of Merionethshire - William Vaughan
- Lord Lieutenant of Montgomeryshire – Henry Herbert, 1st Earl of Powis
- Lord Lieutenant of Pembrokeshire – Sir William Owen, 4th Baronet
- Lord Lieutenant of Radnorshire – Edward Harley, 4th Earl of Oxford and Earl Mortimer (from 16 July)
- Bishop of Bangor – John Egerton
- Bishop of Llandaff – John Ewer
- Bishop of St Asaph – Richard Newcome
- Bishop of St Davids – Charles Moss (from 30 November)

== Events ==
- 30 April - John Guest of Broseley becomes manager of Dowlais Ironworks.
- 29 August - John Wesley begins a two-week evangelical tour of South Wales.
- Autumn - Cyfarthfa Ironworks probably first comes into blast.
- date unknown - On the death of Daniel Lewis, another local Baptist, Rachel Lewis, hosts meetings of multiple denominations in her home at Merthyr Tydfil.

== Arts and literature ==
=== New books ===
- Evan Thomas (Ieuan Fardd Ddu) - Traethawd ar Fywyd Ffydd

=== Painting ===
- Thomas Jones is awarded a premium for landscape painting by the Society of Arts.

== Births ==
- 25 February - John Roberts, theologian (died 1834)
- 2 October - John Evans, Baptist minister and writer (died 1827)
- date unknown - Hugh Evans (Hywel Eryri), poet (died c.1841)
- probable - James Davies, Baptist minister (died 1860)

== Deaths ==
- 29 April - Sir John Morgan, 4th Baronet, of Llangattock, politician, 56
- 8 May - Emanuel Bowen, map engraver, 72
- 11 September - Theophilus Evans, clergyman and historian, 74
- 17 September - Prince Edward, Duke of York and Albany, second son of Frederick, Prince of Wales, 28
- date unknown - Richard Nanney, evangelist, 75/76
