= 1771 in Wales =

- Centuries: 16th; 17th; 18th; 19th; 20th
- Decades: 1750s; 1760s; 1770s; 1780s; 1790s
- See also: List of years in Wales; Timeline of Welsh history 1771 in Great Britain Scotland Elsewhere

This article is about the particular significance of the year 1771 to Wales and its people.

== Incumbents ==
- Lord Lieutenant of Anglesey - Sir Nicholas Bayly, 2nd Baronet
- Lord Lieutenant of Brecknockshire and Monmouthshire – Thomas Morgan of Rhiwpera (until 15 May) Charles Morgan of Dderw (from 23 December)
- Lord Lieutenant of Caernarvonshire - Thomas Wynn
- Lord Lieutenant of Cardiganshire – Wilmot Vaughan, 1st Earl of Lisburne
- Lord Lieutenant of Carmarthenshire – George Rice
- Lord Lieutenant of Denbighshire - Richard Myddelton
- Lord Lieutenant of Flintshire - Sir Roger Mostyn, 5th Baronet
- Lord Lieutenant of Glamorgan – Other Windsor, 4th Earl of Plymouth (until 21 April)
- Lord Lieutenant of Merionethshire - William Vaughan
- Lord Lieutenant of Montgomeryshire – Henry Herbert, 1st Earl of Powis
- Lord Lieutenant of Pembrokeshire – Sir William Owen, 4th Baronet
- Lord Lieutenant of Radnorshire – Edward Harley, 4th Earl of Oxford and Earl Mortimer
- Bishop of Bangor – John Ewer
- Bishop of Llandaff – Shute Barrington
- Bishop of St Asaph – Jonathan Shipley
- Bishop of St Davids – Charles Moss

== Events ==
- 4 February - First meeting of the Cymdeithas y Gwyneddigion is held; Owen Jones is its president.
- 21 December - Sir Watkin Williams-Wynn, 4th Baronet, marries, as his second wife, Charlotte Grenville.

== Arts and literature ==
=== New books ===
- Henry Evans - Cynghorion Tad i'w Fab (translated from English)
- David Williams - The Philosopher, in Three Conversations

=== Music ===
- Elis Roberts - Tair Rhan Oes Dyn
- Peter Williams (1722-1796) - Hymns on Various Subjects (includes "Prayer for Strength", the first English translation of the hymn "Cwm Rhondda")

== Births ==
- 14 May - Robert Owen, socialist businessman, founder of the cooperative movement (died 1858)
- 27 July - Simon Yorke, politician (died 1858)
- date unknown - Hannibal Evans Lloyd, English-born translator of Welsh parentage (died 1847)

== Deaths ==
- 21 April - Other Windsor, 4th Earl of Plymouth, Lord Lieutenant of Glamorgan, 39
- 15 May - Thomas Morgan (of Rhiwpera), politician, 43
- 9 June - Richard Trevor, former bishop of St David's, 63
- 17 November - Lewis Hopkin, poet, 63
- date unknown - Alban Thomas, physician
