= 1770 in Wales =

- Centuries: 16th; 17th; 18th; 19th; 20th
- Decades: 1750s; 1760s; 1770s; 1780s; 1790s
- See also: List of years in Wales; Timeline of Welsh history 1770 in Great Britain Scotland Elsewhere

This article is about the particular significance of the year 1770 to Wales and its people.

== Incumbents ==
- Lord Lieutenant of Anglesey - Sir Nicholas Bayly, 2nd Baronet
- Lord Lieutenant of Brecknockshire and Monmouthshire – Thomas Morgan of Rhiwpera
- Lord Lieutenant of Caernarvonshire - Thomas Wynn
- Lord Lieutenant of Cardiganshire – Wilmot Vaughan, 1st Earl of Lisburne
- Lord Lieutenant of Carmarthenshire – George Rice
- Lord Lieutenant of Denbighshire - Richard Myddelton
- Lord Lieutenant of Flintshire - Sir Roger Mostyn, 5th Baronet
- Lord Lieutenant of Glamorgan – Other Windsor, 4th Earl of Plymouth
- Lord Lieutenant of Merionethshire - William Vaughan
- Lord Lieutenant of Montgomeryshire – Henry Herbert, 1st Earl of Powis
- Lord Lieutenant of Pembrokeshire – Sir William Owen, 4th Baronet
- Lord Lieutenant of Radnorshire – Edward Harley, 4th Earl of Oxford and Earl Mortimer
- Bishop of Bangor – John Ewer
- Bishop of Llandaff – Shute Barrington
- Bishop of St Asaph – Jonathan Shipley
- Bishop of St Davids – Charles Moss

== Events ==
- September - Sir Watkin Williams-Wynn, 4th Baronet, holds his legendary coming-of-age party, to which 15,000 guests are invited. Three coachloads of cooks are sent from London to provide the refreshments, and a hall is built especially for the occasion at Wynnstay.
- Approximate date - Bridge at Pontardawe built by William Edwards.

== Arts and literature ==
=== New books ===
- Robert Jones (Calvinistic Methodist) - Lleferydd yr Asyn
- Thomas Meredith - An Illustration of Several Texts of Scripture
- John Walters - A Dissertation on the Welsh Language
- Sir John Wynn, 1st Baronet - History of the Gwydir Family (posthumously published)

=== Music ===
- Daines Barrington - Some Account of Two Musical Instruments Used in Wales

== Births ==
- 15 January - Sir John Edwards, 1st Baronet, of Garth, politician (died 1850)
- 8 April - John Jenkins (Ifor Ceri), antiquarian (died 1829)
- 14 April - John Evans, explorer (died 1799)
- 30 April - David Thompson, explorer (died 1857)

== Deaths ==
- 13 January - Howel Davies, Methodist leader, about 54
- 19 June - Thomas Williams, Congregational minister, about 45
- 8 August - John Jones, clergyman and author, 70
