= 1774 in Wales =

- Centuries: 16th; 17th; 18th; 19th; 20th
- Decades: 1750s; 1760s; 1770s; 1780s; 1790s
- See also: List of years in Wales; Timeline of Welsh history 1774 in Great Britain Scotland Elsewhere

This article is about the particular significance of the year 1774 to Wales and its people.

== Incumbents ==
- Lord Lieutenant of Anglesey - Sir Nicholas Bayly, 2nd Baronet
- Lord Lieutenant of Brecknockshire and Monmouthshire – Charles Morgan of Dderw
- Lord Lieutenant of Caernarvonshire - Thomas Wynn
- Lord Lieutenant of Cardiganshire – Wilmot Vaughan, 1st Earl of Lisburne
- Lord Lieutenant of Carmarthenshire – George Rice
- Lord Lieutenant of Denbighshire - Richard Myddelton
- Lord Lieutenant of Flintshire - Sir Roger Mostyn, 5th Baronet
- Lord Lieutenant of Glamorgan – John Stuart, Lord Mountstuart
- Lord Lieutenant of Merionethshire - William Vaughan
- Lord Lieutenant of Montgomeryshire – Robert Clive (until 2 November)
- Lord Lieutenant of Pembrokeshire – Sir William Owen, 4th Baronet
- Lord Lieutenant of Radnorshire – Edward Harley, 4th Earl of Oxford and Earl Mortimer
- Bishop of Bangor – John Ewer (until 28 October) John Moore
- Bishop of Llandaff – Shute Barrington
- Bishop of St Asaph – Jonathan Shipley
- Bishop of St Davids – Charles Moss (until 2 June); James Yorke (from 26 June)

== Events ==
- July - Dr Samuel Johnson accompanies Hester Thrale and her husband on a visit to North Wales.
- unknown dates
  - John Wilkinson takes out a patent for cannon-boring at his works in Bersham.
  - An Act of Parliament establishes the Improvement Commissioners, responsible for paving, cleaning streets and providing oil lamp lighting in Cardiff.
  - Construction work is completed on Morris Castle, "Wales's first block of flats".
  - Edward Jones, an "exhorter" at Whitefield's Tabernacle, Moorfields, and a lay preacher, begins holding Welsh-language services in Cock Lane, Smithfield, London.

== Arts and literature ==
=== New books ===
- Hugh Hughes - Rheolau Bywyd Dynol (translation of Robert Dodsley's The Oeconomy of Human Life
- Dafydd Jones - Marwnad Enoch Ffransis
- Hugh Jones (Maesglasau) - Cydymaith yr Hwsmon

=== Music ===
- William Williams Pantycelyn - Ychydig Hymnau (hymns)

=== Paintings ===
- Thomas Jones - The Bard
- Richard Wilson - Llyn y Cau, Cadair Idris

== Births ==
- 16 January - Daniel Evans, independent minister (died 1835)
- May - John Elias, preacher (died 1841)
- 24 June - Azariah Shadrach, writer (died 1844)
- date unknown - Sir John Waters, military commander (died 1842)

== Deaths ==
- 13 January - John Pugh Pryse, politician, 34
- 4 July - William Price, High Sheriff of Merionethshire and Caernarvonshire, 84
- 28 October - John Ewer, Bishop of Bangor, about 70
- date unknown
  - Rowland Jones, philologist, 57
  - Dafydd Nicolas, poet
