= 1768 in Wales =

- Centuries: 16th; 17th; 18th; 19th; 20th
- Decades: 1740s; 1750s; 1760s; 1770s; 1780s
- See also: List of years in Wales; Timeline of Welsh history 1768 in Great Britain Scotland Elsewhere

This article is about the particular significance of the year 1768 to Wales and its people.

== Incumbents ==
- Lord Lieutenant of Anglesey - Sir Nicholas Bayly, 2nd Baronet
- Lord Lieutenant of Brecknockshire and Lord Lieutenant of Monmouthshire – Thomas Morgan
- Lord Lieutenant of Caernarvonshire - Thomas Wynn
- Lord Lieutenant of Cardiganshire – Wilmot Vaughan, 1st Earl of Lisburne
- Lord Lieutenant of Carmarthenshire – George Rice
- Lord Lieutenant of Denbighshire - Richard Myddelton
- Lord Lieutenant of Flintshire - Sir Roger Mostyn, 5th Baronet
- Lord Lieutenant of Glamorgan – Other Windsor, 4th Earl of Plymouth
- Lord Lieutenant of Merionethshire - William Vaughan
- Lord Lieutenant of Montgomeryshire – Henry Herbert, 1st Earl of Powis
- Lord Lieutenant of Pembrokeshire – Sir William Owen, 4th Baronet
- Lord Lieutenant of Radnorshire – Edward Harley, 4th Earl of Oxford and Earl Mortimer
- Bishop of Bangor – John Egerton
- Bishop of Llandaff – John Ewer
- Bishop of St Asaph – Richard Newcome
- Bishop of St Davids – Charles Moss (from 30 November)

== Events ==
- 2 March - Rowland Pugh, a local miner, discovers the "Great Lode" of copper on Parys Mountain and is rewarded with a bottle of whisky and a rent-free house for his lifetime.
- By May - Kymer's Canal opens.
- 16 May - Evan Lloyd is fined £50 after being found guilty of libel against William Price.
- 24 August - A seminary is founded at Trefeca-isaf for the training of evangelical preachers, with financial assistance from Selina, Countess of Huntingdon.
- 10 December - Richard Wilson is a founder member of the Royal Academy of Arts.
- Oldest Jews' burial ground in Wales established at Swansea.
- The Ladies of Llangollen meet for the first time in Ireland.
- Controversial Bishop of Bangor John Egerton is translated to the see of Lichfield in England.

== Arts and literature ==
=== New books ===
==== English language ====
- John Griffith - Some Brief Remarks upon Sundry Important Subjects ... principally addressed to the ... Quakers ...

==== Welsh language ====
- Thomas Edwards (Twm o'r Nant) - Y Farddoneg Fabilonaidd
- William Williams Pantycelyn - Tri Wyr o Sodom

=== Music ===
- 14 May - In Dublin, a concert takes place for the benefit of "Jones", a resident of Britain Street, where music will be performed on "that most admired instrument, the Welsh Harp".

== Births ==
- 29 March - Sir Robert Vaughan, 2nd Baronet, landowner (died 1843)
- 17 May (in Brunswick, Germany) - Caroline of Brunswick, future Princess of Wales (died 1821)
- 5 August - Sydenham Edwards, botanical artist (died 1819)
- 17 September - Edward Lloyd, 1st Baron Mostyn (died 1854)(died 1854)
- 22 November - William Williams (Gwilym Twrog), poet (died 1836)
- date unknown
  - John Bird, landscape artist (died 1829)
  - Thomas Parry, merchant (died 1824)

== Deaths ==
- 14 March - Owen Rees, Calvinist minister, 50/51
- 26 March - Humphrey Owen, academic, 65
- 13 May - Princess Louisa, daughter of the former Prince and Princess of Wales, 19 (consumption)
- 31 August - Henrietta Nevill, Baroness Bergavenny, 38
- date unknown
  - Robert Morris, industrialist
  - Hannah Pritchard, actress
