= 1765 in Wales =

- Centuries: 16th; 17th; 18th; 19th; 20th
- Decades: 1740s; 1750s; 1760s; 1770s; 1780s
- See also: List of years in Wales; Timeline of Welsh history 1765 in Great Britain Scotland Elsewhere

Events from the year 1765 in Wales.

== Incumbents ==
- Lord Lieutenant of Anglesey – Sir Nicholas Bayly, 2nd Baronet
- Lord Lieutenant of Brecknockshire and Lord Lieutenant of Monmouthshire – Thomas Morgan
- Lord Lieutenant of Caernarvonshire – Thomas Wynn
- Lord Lieutenant of Cardiganshire – Wilmot Vaughan, 1st Earl of Lisburne
- Lord Lieutenant of Carmarthenshire – George Rice
- Lord Lieutenant of Denbighshire – Richard Myddelton
- Lord Lieutenant of Flintshire – Sir Roger Mostyn, 5th Baronet
- Lord Lieutenant of Glamorgan – Other Windsor, 4th Earl of Plymouth
- Lord Lieutenant of Merionethshire – William Vaughan
- Lord Lieutenant of Montgomeryshire – Henry Herbert, 1st Earl of Powis
- Lord Lieutenant of Pembrokeshire – Sir William Owen, 4th Baronet
- Lord Lieutenant of Radnorshire – Howell Gwynne
- Bishop of Bangor – John Egerton
- Bishop of Llandaff – John Ewer
- Bishop of St Asaph – Richard Newcome
- Bishop of St Davids – Samuel Squire

== Events ==
- July – Henry Herbert, 1st Earl of Powis, resigns from his position as Treasurer of the Household when his former party, the Whigs, are returned to power.
- 6 December – The Penrhyn estate comes into the possession of the Pennant family, through the marriage of Richard Pennant with the heiress of the Warburton family.
- unknown dates
  - Cyfarthfa Ironworks is founded by Anthony Bacon.
  - Richard Price becomes a Fellow of the Royal Society.

== Arts and literature ==
=== New books ===
- John Jones – Catholic Faith and Practice

=== Music ===
- 12 August – The Royal Shepherd, by Richard Rolt, is performed in Dublin to celebrate the birthday of the Prince of Wales.

== Births ==
- 4 May – Hopkin Bevan, minister and writer (died 1839)
- 23 August – James Davies, schoolmaster
- 8 October – George Rice, 3rd Baron Dynevor, politician (died 1852)
- 13 October – J. R. Jones (Ramoth), Baptist minister (died 1822)
- date unknown – David Jones, barrister (died 1816)

== Deaths ==
- 10 April – Edward Heylyn, porcelain manufacturer, 69/70
- 11 April – Lewis Morris, hydrographer and writer, eldest of the Morris brothers of Anglesey, 64
- 16 May – William Wynne, lawyer and author, about 73
- 8 June – Silvanus Bevan, apothecary, 73/74
- 16 December – Thomas William, Methodist exhorter, 48
- 29 December – Prince Frederick William of Wales, son of the former Prince and Princess of Wales, 15
