= 1769 in Wales =

- Centuries: 16th; 17th; 18th; 19th; 20th
- Decades: 1740s; 1750s; 1760s; 1770s; 1780s
- See also: List of years in Wales; Timeline of Welsh history 1769 in Great Britain Scotland Elsewhere

Events from the year 1769 in Wales.

== Incumbents ==
- Lord Lieutenant of Anglesey - Sir Nicholas Bayly, 2nd Baronet
- Lord Lieutenant of Brecknockshire and Lord Lieutenant of Monmouthshire – Thomas Morgan (until 12 April)
- Lord Lieutenant of Caernarvonshire - Thomas Wynn
- Lord Lieutenant of Cardiganshire – Wilmot Vaughan, 1st Earl of Lisburne
- Lord Lieutenant of Carmarthenshire – George Rice
- Lord Lieutenant of Denbighshire - Richard Myddelton
- Lord Lieutenant of Flintshire - Sir Roger Mostyn, 5th Baronet
- Lord Lieutenant of Glamorgan – Other Windsor, 4th Earl of Plymouth
- Lord Lieutenant of Merionethshire - William Vaughan
- Lord Lieutenant of Montgomeryshire – Henry Herbert, 1st Earl of Powis
- Lord Lieutenant of Pembrokeshire – Sir William Owen, 4th Baronet
- Lord Lieutenant of Radnorshire – Edward Harley, 4th Earl of Oxford and Earl Mortimer
- Bishop of Bangor – John Egerton (until 10 January); John Ewer
- Bishop of Llandaff – John Ewer (until 10 January); Jonathan Shipley (12 February - 8 September); Shute Barrington (from 1 October)
- Bishop of St Asaph – Richard Newcome (until 3 June); Jonathan Shipley (from September)
- Bishop of St Davids – Charles Moss (from 30 November)

== Events ==
- August
  - John Wesley is turned away from Welshpool Town Hall by the bailiff when he attempts to preach there during his tour of Wales.
  - Wesley speaks at Newtown, Montgomeryshire, and Llanidloes.
- August/September - Robert Williams, a Welsh travelling preacher, arrives in America, the first licensed preacher to obtain permission from John Wesley to address the Methodist societies there.
- 16 November - Henry Bayley succeeds to the barony of Beaudesert and takes the surname Paget.
- date unknown
  - Daniel Rowland turns down the living of Newport, Pembrokeshire, to stay with his congregation at Llangeitho.
  - Thomas Pennant employs Moses Griffith to illustrate his books of tours.

== Arts and literature ==
=== New books ===
- Elizabeth Griffith - The School for Rakes (play)
- William Williams (Pantycelyn) - Ffarwel Weledig, vol. 3

== Births ==
- 2 February - Griffith Williams (Gutyn Peris), poet (died 1838)
- 23 March - Benjamin Heath Malkin, antiquary and author (died 1842)
- 3 May - John Vaughan, 3rd Earl of Lisburne, politician (died 1831)
- 6 December - Thomas Morgan, naval chaplain (died 1851)

== Deaths ==
- 27 March - John Thomas, Anglican priest and antiquarian, 32
- April - Marmaduke Gwynne, father-in-law of Charles Wesley, 77/78
- 12 April - Thomas Morgan, politician and lawyer, 66
- 3 June - Richard Newcome, Bishop of St Asaph, 67/68
- July - Goronwy Owen, poet, 46
- 19 August - Sir Herbert Lloyd, 1st Baronet, politician, 49
- 26 December - Edward Yardley, Archdeacon of St David's, 71
