= 1773 in Wales =

- Centuries: 16th; 17th; 18th; 19th; 20th
- Decades: 1750s; 1760s; 1770s; 1780s; 1790s
- See also: List of years in Wales; Timeline of Welsh history 1773 in Great Britain Scotland Elsewhere

This article is about the particular significance of the year 1773 to Wales and its people.

== Incumbents ==
- Lord Lieutenant of Anglesey - Sir Nicholas Bayly, 2nd Baronet
- Lord Lieutenant of Brecknockshire and Monmouthshire – Charles Morgan of Dderw
- Lord Lieutenant of Caernarvonshire - Thomas Wynn
- Lord Lieutenant of Cardiganshire – Wilmot Vaughan, 1st Earl of Lisburne
- Lord Lieutenant of Carmarthenshire – George Rice
- Lord Lieutenant of Denbighshire - Richard Myddelton
- Lord Lieutenant of Flintshire - Sir Roger Mostyn, 5th Baronet
- Lord Lieutenant of Glamorgan – John Stuart, Lord Mountstuart
- Lord Lieutenant of Merionethshire - William Vaughan
- Lord Lieutenant of Montgomeryshire – Robert Clive (from 17 June)
- Lord Lieutenant of Pembrokeshire – Sir William Owen, 4th Baronet
- Lord Lieutenant of Radnorshire – Edward Harley, 4th Earl of Oxford and Earl Mortimer
- Bishop of Bangor – John Ewer
- Bishop of Llandaff – Shute Barrington
- Bishop of St Asaph – Jonathan Shipley
- Bishop of St Davids – Charles Moss

== Events ==
- 22 April - An earthquake occurs in the Caernarfon area, with an estimated strength of 3.7.
- 7 November - Richard Morris makes his will.
- 25 November - Walter Siddons marries Sarah Kemble.
- date unknown
  - Dolauhirion Bridge is built on the Llandovery to Cilycwm road by William Edwards.
  - David Williams, having resigned from the ministry, opens a school in Chelsea.

== Arts and literature ==
=== New books ===
- Evan Evans (Ieuan Fardd) - Rhybudd Cyfr-drist i'r Diofal a Difraw
- John Roberts (Siôn Robert Lewis) - Geirlyfr Ysgrythurol

=== Music ===
- James Rivington settles in New York, where he begins selling musical instruments, including "Welsh harps".

== Births ==
- 21 February - Titus Lewis, preacher and writer (died 1811)
- 21 April - Christopher Bethell, English clergyman, Bishop of Bangor 1830-1859 (died 1859)
- 14 November - Stapleton Stapleton-Cotton, 1st Viscount Combermere, military leader (died 1865)
- date unknown
  - Catherine Davies, royal governess and memoirist (died c.1841)
  - Joseph Harris (Gomer), writer (died 1825)

== Deaths ==
- 16 February - Sir John Wynn, 2nd Baronet, 71
- 21 July - Howell Harris, Methodist leader, 59
