= 1775 in Wales =

- Centuries: 16th; 17th; 18th; 19th; 20th
- Decades: 1750s; 1760s; 1770s; 1780s; 1790s
- See also: List of years in Wales; Timeline of Welsh history 1775 in Great Britain Scotland Elsewhere

This article is about the particular significance of the year 1775 to Wales and its people.

== Incumbents ==
- Lord Lieutenant of Anglesey - Sir Nicholas Bayly, 2nd Baronet
- Lord Lieutenant of Brecknockshire and Monmouthshire – Charles Morgan of Dderw
- Lord Lieutenant of Caernarvonshire - Thomas Wynn
- Lord Lieutenant of Cardiganshire – Wilmot Vaughan, 1st Earl of Lisburne
- Lord Lieutenant of Carmarthenshire – George Rice
- Lord Lieutenant of Denbighshire - Richard Myddelton
- Lord Lieutenant of Flintshire - Sir Roger Mostyn, 5th Baronet
- Lord Lieutenant of Glamorgan – John Stuart, Lord Mountstuart
- Lord Lieutenant of Merionethshire - William Vaughan (until 12 April); Sir Watkin Williams-Wynn, 4th Baronet (from 10 June)
- Lord Lieutenant of Montgomeryshire – Francis Seymour-Conway, 1st Marquess of Hertford (from 20 April)
- Lord Lieutenant of Pembrokeshire – Sir William Owen, 4th Baronet (until 24 June); Sir Hugh Owen, 5th Baronet (from 24 June)
- Lord Lieutenant of Radnorshire – Edward Harley, 4th Earl of Oxford and Earl Mortimer
- Bishop of Bangor – John Moore
- Bishop of Llandaff – Shute Barrington
- Bishop of St Asaph – Jonathan Shipley
- Bishop of St Davids – James Yorke

== Events ==
- 19 April - Outbreak of the American Revolutionary War:
  - Anthony Bacon obtains munitions contracts for his ironworks.
  - Fort Belan built commanding the western end of the Menai Strait by Thomas Wynn.
- 8 September - An earthquake measuring 5.1 is felt in Swansea.
- 18 September - Dr Samuel Johnson accompanies Hester Thrale and her husband Henry on a visit to France.

== Arts and literature ==
=== New books ===
- Edward Evans - An Address delivered before the Association of Ministers at Dref Wen, near Newcastle Emlyn, with two Hymns
- Elizabeth Griffith - The Morality of Shakespeare's Drama Illustrated
- Nicholas Owen (attr.) - History of the Island of Anglesea

=== Music ===
- Dafydd Jones - Hymnau a Chaniadau Ysprydol (hymns and psalms)
- Morgan Rhys - Golwg o Ben Nebo, 3rd ed. (collection of hymns)
- Edward Jones (Bardd y Brenin) arrives in London.

== Births ==
- 22 February - John Hughes, minister, author and hymn-writer (died 1854)
- 7 May - John Parry, minister and author (died 1846)
- 25 November - Charles Kemble, actor (died 1854)
- December - John Jones (Archdeacon of Merioneth), Anglican priest and writer (died 1834)
- date unknown - John Roberts, Anglican priest and writer (died 1829)

== Deaths ==
- 11 April - Roger Mostyn, Canon of Windsor, 54/55
- 12 April - William Vaughan (MP), politician, about 68
- 10 May - Caroline Matilda, queen consort of Sweden, daughter of Frederick, Prince of Wales, 23 (scarlet fever)
- 14 August - Sir Lynch Cotton, 4th Baronet, about 70
