= 1772 in Wales =

- Centuries: 16th; 17th; 18th; 19th; 20th
- Decades: 1750s; 1760s; 1770s; 1780s; 1790s
- See also: List of years in Wales; Timeline of Welsh history 1772 in Great Britain Scotland Elsewhere

This article is about the particular significance of the year 1772 to Wales and its people.

== Incumbents ==
- Lord Lieutenant of Anglesey - Sir Nicholas Bayly, 2nd Baronet
- Lord Lieutenant of Brecknockshire and Monmouthshire – Thomas Morgan of Rhiwpera (until 15 May) Charles Morgan of Dderw (from 23 December)
- Lord Lieutenant of Caernarvonshire - Thomas Wynn
- Lord Lieutenant of Cardiganshire – Wilmot Vaughan, 1st Earl of Lisburne
- Lord Lieutenant of Carmarthenshire – George Rice
- Lord Lieutenant of Denbighshire - Richard Myddelton
- Lord Lieutenant of Flintshire - Sir Roger Mostyn, 5th Baronet
- Lord Lieutenant of Glamorgan – John Stuart, Lord Mountstuart (from 22 March)
- Lord Lieutenant of Merionethshire - William Vaughan
- Lord Lieutenant of Montgomeryshire – Henry Herbert, 1st Earl of Powis (until 11 September);
- Lord Lieutenant of Pembrokeshire – Sir William Owen, 4th Baronet
- Lord Lieutenant of Radnorshire – Edward Harley, 4th Earl of Oxford and Earl Mortimer
- Bishop of Bangor – John Ewer
- Bishop of Llandaff – Shute Barrington
- Bishop of St Asaph – Jonathan Shipley
- Bishop of St Davids – Charles Moss

== Events ==
- May - Walter Siddons appears on stage at Chester and joins the Kemble family troupe.
- The Stepney family of Prendergast sell their Pembrokeshire estates.
- Henry Herbert is promoted to general, shortly before his death.

== Arts and literature ==
=== New books ===
==== English language ====
- Evan Evans (Ieuan Fardd) - The Love of our Country
- Williams Evans - A New English-Welsh dictionary: Containing All Words Necessary for Reading an English Author
- Jinny Jenks - Tour through Wales
- Richard Price - Appeal ... on the National Debt

==== Welsh language ====
- Iolo Morganwg - Dagrau yr Awen
- Job Orton - Eglwys yn y Ty : neu Bregeth am Grefydd-Deuluaidd.
- Daniel Rowland - Pum Pregeth ac Amryw o Hymnau

=== Music ===
- William Williams Pantycelyn writes the words of the missionary hymn "O'er the Gloomy Hills of Darkness".

== Births ==
- 10 January - William Jenkins Rees, antiquary (died 1855)
- 28 May - Hans Busk, poet (died 1862)
- 11 July - John Davies, missionary (died 1855)
- July - Edward Hughes (Y Dryw), bard (died 1850)
- 26 October - Sir Watkin Williams-Wynn, 5th Baronet (died 1840)

== Deaths ==
- 8 February - Augusta of Saxe-Gotha, Dowager Princess of Wales, 52 (throat cancer)
- 11 September - Henry Herbert, 1st Earl of Powis, 69
- October - Sir Thomas Stepney, 6th Baronet,
- 16 October - Richard Farrington, antiquary, 71
