= 1776 in Wales =

- Centuries: 16th; 17th; 18th; 19th; 20th
- Decades: 1750s; 1760s; 1770s; 1780s; 1790s
- See also: List of years in Wales; Timeline of Welsh history 1776 in Great Britain Scotland Elsewhere

This article is about the significance of the year 1776 to Wales and its people.

== Incumbents ==
- Lord Lieutenant of Anglesey - Sir Nicholas Bayly, 2nd Baronet
- Lord Lieutenant of Brecknockshire and Monmouthshire – Charles Morgan of Dderw
- Lord Lieutenant of Caernarvonshire - Thomas Wynn
- Lord Lieutenant of Cardiganshire – Wilmot Vaughan, 1st Earl of Lisburne
- Lord Lieutenant of Carmarthenshire – George Rice
- Lord Lieutenant of Denbighshire - Richard Myddelton
- Lord Lieutenant of Flintshire - Sir Roger Mostyn, 5th Baronet
- Lord Lieutenant of Glamorgan – John Stuart, Lord Mountstuart
- Lord Lieutenant of Merionethshire - Sir Watkin Williams-Wynn, 4th Baronet (from 10 June)
- Lord Lieutenant of Montgomeryshire – Francis Seymour-Conway, 1st Marquess of Hertford (until 21 November); George Herbert, 2nd Earl of Powis (from 21 November)
- Lord Lieutenant of Pembrokeshire – Sir Hugh Owen, 5th Baronet
- Lord Lieutenant of Radnorshire – Edward Harley, 4th Earl of Oxford and Earl Mortimer
- Bishop of Bangor – John Moore
- Bishop of Llandaff – Shute Barrington
- Bishop of St Asaph – Jonathan Shipley
- Bishop of St Davids – James Yorke

== Events ==
- 4 July – United States Declaration of Independence signed in Philadelphia. Sixteen of the 56 signatories are of Welsh descent, Francis Lewis having been born in Llandaff.
- 22 July – Sir Richard Philipps, 7th Baronet, is created 1st Baron Milford in the peerage of Ireland.
- 24 August – Herbert Mackworth is created a baronet.
- dates unknown
  - John, Lord Mountstuart is created Baron Cardiff of Cardiff Castle.
  - Sir Thomas Wynn, 3rd Baronet, is created Baron Newborough in the Peerage of Ireland.

== Arts and literature ==
=== New books ===
- Thomas Churchyard – The Worthines of Wales, a Poem
- Evan Evans (Ieuan Fardd) – Casgliad o Bregethau
- Hugh Jones (Maesglasau) – Gardd y Caniadau
- David Powell (Dewi Nantbrân) – Allwydd y Nef. O gasgliad D.P. Off.

=== Music ===
- Aaron Williams - Collection of hymn-tunes

== Births ==
- 18 February – John Parry, composer (d. 1851)
- April (baptized 21 April) – Ann Griffiths, hymn-writer (d. 1805)
- 2 August – Thomas Assheton Smith II, landowner, industrialist, politician, and sportsman (d. 1858)
- 20 October – Sir Thomas Mostyn, 6th Baronet, politician (d. 1831)
- dates unknown
  - John Bryan (died 1856)
  - William Henry Scourfield, Member of Parliament (d. 1843)

== Deaths ==
- 26 January – Evan Lloyd, poet, 41
- 6 April – Hugh Hughes ("Y Bardd Coch"), poet, 83
- 4 July – Sir John Powell Pryce, 6th Baronet (in debtors' prison)
- 6 September – Joshua Parry, Nonconformist minister and writer, 67
- 1 November – Miles Harry, Baptist minister, 76
- December – John Edwards ("Sion y Potiau"), poet, 76/77
- 10 December – Robert Hay Drummond, Bishop of St Asaph 1748–1761, 65
- dates unknown
  - William Evans, lexicographer, age unknown
  - Aaron Williams, composer, about 45
