= 1763 in Wales =

- Centuries: 16th; 17th; 18th; 19th; 20th
- Decades: 1740s; 1750s; 1760s; 1770s; 1780s
- See also: List of years in Wales; Timeline of Welsh history 1763 in Great Britain Scotland Elsewhere

Events from the year 1763 in Wales.

== Incumbents ==
- Lord Lieutenant of Anglesey – Sir Nicholas Bayly, 2nd Baronet
- Lord Lieutenant of Brecknockshire and Lord Lieutenant of Monmouthshire – Thomas Morgan
- Lord Lieutenant of Caernarvonshire – Thomas Wynn
- Lord Lieutenant of Cardiganshire – Wilmot Vaughan, 1st Earl of Lisburne (from 27 July)
- Lord Lieutenant of Carmarthenshire – George Rice
- Lord Lieutenant of Denbighshire – Richard Myddelton
- Lord Lieutenant of Flintshire – Sir Roger Mostyn, 5th Baronet
- Lord Lieutenant of Glamorgan – Other Windsor, 4th Earl of Plymouth
- Lord Lieutenant of Merionethshire – William Vaughan
- Lord Lieutenant of Montgomeryshire – Henry Herbert, 1st Earl of Powis
- Lord Lieutenant of Pembrokeshire – Sir William Owen, 4th Baronet
- Lord Lieutenant of Radnorshire – Howell Gwynne
- Bishop of Bangor – John Egerton
- Bishop of Llandaff – John Ewer
- Bishop of St Asaph – Richard Newcome
- Bishop of St Davids – Samuel Squire

== Events ==
- 26 January – Herbert Lloyd, MP for Cardigan Boroughs, is created a baronet.
- 11 October – Hester Lynch Salusbury marries Henry Thrale, against her family's wishes.
- 5 December – Charles Morgan replaces Thomas Morgan (of Rhiwpera) as MP for Brecon.
- Plymouth Ironworks at Merthyr Tydfil established.
- Richard Penrhyn is created Baron Penrhyn

== Arts and literature ==
=== New books ===
- Goronwy Owen, Lewis Morris et al. – Diddanwch Teuluaidd
- Tomshone Catty's Tricks

=== Music ===
- Aaron Williams – The Universal Psalmodist

== Births ==
- 1 April – John Wynne Griffith, politician (died 1834)
- 13 April – Robert Nicholl Carne, landowner (died 1849)
- August – Peter Bailey Williams, clergyman and author (died 1836)

== Deaths ==
- 18 May – Robert Williams, politician, about 68
- 16 July – William Morgan (of Tredegar, younger), politician, 38
- 25 November – Richard Morris, father of the noted Morris brothers ("Morrisiaid Môn"), 89
