= Chevy Chase (disambiguation) =

Chevy Chase (born 1943) is an American comedian and actor.

Chevy Chase may also refer to:

== Places ==
- A parcel of hunting land (or chase) in the Cheviot Hills on the border of Scotland and England, in the UK
- A shopping mall in the Eldon Square Shopping Centre, Newcastle upon Tyne, England, UK; named for the Cheviot Chase
- Chevy Chase, Maryland, a suburb of Washington, D.C., US; comprising:
  - Chevy Chase (town), Maryland, an incorporated town
  - Chevy Chase (CDP), Maryland, a census-designated place
  - Chevy Chase View, Maryland
  - Chevy Chase Village, Maryland
  - Chevy Chase Section Three
  - Chevy Chase Section Five
  - Martin's Additions, Maryland
  - North Chevy Chase
- Chevy Chase (Washington, D.C.), a neighborhood of Washington, D.C., bordering Chevy Chase, Maryland, US
- Chevy Chase, Lexington, a neighborhood in southeastern Lexington, Kentucky, United States
- Chevy Chase Heights, a census-designated place in Pennsylvania, United States

== Other uses ==
- Chevy Chase Arcade, listed on the National Register of Historic Places in Washington, D.C.
- Chevy Chase Bank, formerly the largest bank in the Washington Metropolitan Area
- Chevy Chase (house), a heritage-listed house in Melbourne, Victoria, Australia
- "The Ballad of Chevy Chase", a 16th-century ballad from the borderland between England and Scotland; the source of the term
  - Derived from the ballad, but usually spelled Chevy Chace, a variant name of the children's game Darebase
- Battle of Otterburn, also known as the Battle of Chevy Chase
- The Hunting of Chevy Chase, an 1826 painting by Edwin Landseer
- Avalon Theatre (Washington, D.C.), listed on the National Register of Historic Places in Washington, D.C.

== See also ==
- Chevy (disambiguation)
- Chase (disambiguation)
