= Chevy Chase Theater =

Chevy Chase Theater or Theatre may refer to:

- Avalon Theatre (Washington, D.C.), originally known as the Chevy Chase Theatre
- Earl Carroll Theatre (Los Angeles), briefly known as the Chevy Chase Theater in 1993
