= 1775 in Great Britain =

Events from the year 1775 in Great Britain.

== Incumbents ==
- Monarch – George III
- Prime Minister – Frederick North, Lord North (Tory)

== Events ==
- 17 January – first performance of Richard Brinsley Sheridan's comedy of manners The Rivals at the Covent Garden Theatre in London.
- 9 February – American Revolution: British Parliament declares Massachusetts in rebellion.
- 22 March – American Revolution: Edmund Burke's speech before the British Parliament on conciliation with the American colonies.
- 3 April – Muzio Clementi makes his London debut as a harpsichordist.
- 19 April – the American Revolutionary War begins with the Battles of Lexington and Concord.
- 10 May – American Revolution: Capture of Fort Ticonderoga by Patriot forces.
- 12 May – American Revolution: Battle of Crown Point.
- 12 June – American Revolution: British forces offer a pardon to all colonists who would lay down their arms.
- 16 June – American Revolution: Battle of Bunker Hill.
- 5 July – American Revolution: the Continental Congress sends the Olive Branch Petition to King George III, hoping for a reconciliation.
- 30 July – second voyage of James Cook: HMS Resolution (1771) anchors at Spithead, Captain Cook having completed the first eastabout global circumnavigation.
- 12 August–3 November – American Revolution: Battle of Fort St. Jean.
- 23 August – American Revolution: refusing even to look at the Olive Branch Petition, King George issues a Proclamation of Rebellion against the American colonies.
- 24 September – American Revolution: Battle of Longue-Pointe.
- 9 December – American Revolution: Battle of Great Bridge – victory by the Virginia's Second Regiment and the Culpeper (Virginia) Minuteman Battalion, leads to withdrawal of the British from the port of Norfolk Borough.
- 30–31 December – American Revolution: Battle of Quebec – British forces repulse an attack by the American Continental Army.
- 1775–76 Winter – Unusually deadly influenza epidemic in London kills nearly 40,000.

=== Undated ===
- Industrial Revolution
  - John Wilkinson (industrialist) invents and patents a new kind of boring machine.
  - The 1769 Watt steam engine patent is extended to June 1800 by Act of Parliament and the first engines are built under it.
  - Josiah Wedgwood introduces jasperware pottery.
- Actress Sarah Siddons makes her debut at the Drury Lane Theatre as Portia in The Merchant of Venice but is not well received.

== Publications ==
- Samuel Johnson's A Journey to the Western Islands of Scotland.
- Augustus Toplady's hymn "Rock of Ages" (first version, in The Gospel Magazine, October).

== Births ==
- 24 January – John Buonarotti Papworth, architect (died 1847)
- 30 January – Walter Savage Landor, writer (died 1864)
- 10 February
  - Charles Lamb, writer (died 1834)
  - James Smith, author (died 1839)
- 12 February – Louisa Adams, First Lady of the United States (died 1852 in the United States)
- 12 March – Joseph Chitty, lawyer and legal writer (died 1841)
- 23 April – J. M. W. Turner, painter (died 1851)
- 13 May – Henry Crabb Robinson, man of letters, lawyer and diarist (died 1867)
- 5 July – William Crotch, composer (died 1847)
- 31 August – Agnes Bulmer, poet (died 1836)
- 25 November – Charles Kemble, actor (died 1854)
- 14 December – Thomas Cochrane, 10th Earl of Dundonald, admiral (died 1860)
- 16 December – Jane Austen, novelist (died 1817)

== Deaths ==
- 8 January – John Baskerville, printer (born 1707)
- 6 February – William Dowdeswell, politician, Chancellor of the Exchequer (born 1721)
- 7 March – Thomas Nuthall, politician and attorney
- 28 May – Barlow Trecothick, merchant and politician (born c. 1719)
- 17 June – Major John Pitcairn, marine (killed in battle) (born 1722)
- 16 September – Allen Bathurst, 1st Earl Bathurst, privy councillor (born 1684)
- 21 November – John Hill, botanist and writer (born c. 1716)
- 7 December – Charles Saunders, admiral (born c. 1715)

== See also ==
- 1775 in Wales
