= 1776 in Great Britain =

Events from the year 1776 in Great Britain.

== Incumbents ==
- Monarch – George III
- Prime Minister – Frederick North, Lord North (Tory)

== Events ==
- 10 January – American Revolution: Thomas Paine publishes his pamphlet Common Sense "written by an Englishman" in Philadelphia arguing for independence from British rule in the Thirteen Colonies.
- 27 February – American Revolution: Battle of Moore's Creek Bridge – Scottish American Loyalists are defeated by North Carolina Patriots.
- 2–3 March – American Revolution:
  - Battle of Nassau: The American Continental Navy and Marines make a successful assault on Nassau, Bahamas.
  - Battle of the Rice Boats: American Patriots resist the Royal Navy on the Savannah River. British control over the Province of Georgia is lost.
- 17 March – American Revolution: British forces evacuate Boston, Massachusetts, after George Washington commands the placement of artillery overlooking the city at Dorchester Heights, ending the 11‑month Siege of Boston.
- 12 April – American Revolution: the Royal Colony of North Carolina produces the Halifax Resolves, making it the first British colony officially to authorize its Continental Congress delegates to vote for independence from Great Britain.
- 4 May – American Revolution: Rhode Island becomes the first American colony to renounce allegiance to George III.
- 15–26 May – American Revolution: Battle of The Cedars – British forces skirmish with the American Continental Army around Les Cèdres, Quebec.
- 23 May
  - The Criminal Law Act introduces hard labour as a punishment since penal transportation to British North America has been made impossible due to the American Revolution (initially intended as a temporary measure). The first prison hulk to accommodate such prisoners comes into use on 15 July on the River Thames.
  - The first purpose-built Freemasons' Hall in England is opened in London to a design by Thomas Sandby.
- 8 June – American Revolution: Battle of Trois-Rivières – the invading American Continental Army is driven back at Trois-Rivières, Quebec.
- 29 June – American Revolution: Battle of Turtle Gut Inlet – the American Continental Navy successfully challenges the Royal Navy blockade off New Jersey.
- 2 July – American Revolution: the Second Continental Congress meeting in Philadelphia passes the "Lee Resolution" resolving that the United Colonies of North America are "free and independent States", independent of the Kingdom of Great Britain.
- 4 July – American Revolution: United States Declaration of Independence approved by the Second Continental Congress.
- 12 July – Captain James Cook sets off from Plymouth in HMS Resolution on his third voyage, to the Pacific Ocean and Arctic, which will be fatal to him.
- 27 August – American Revolution: At the Battle of Long Island Washington's troops are routed in Brooklyn by British under William Howe.
- 11 September – American Revolution: abortive peace conference between British and Americans on Staten Island.
- 15 September – American Revolution: Landing at Kip's Bay – British troops land on Manhattan at Kips Bay.
- 16 September – American Revolution: Battle of Harlem Heights – the Continental Army under Washington are victorious against the British on Manhattan.
- 24 September – first running of the St. Leger Stakes horse race (not yet named), first of the British Classic Races, devised by Anthony St Leger, on Cantley Common at Doncaster. The winner is a filly (later named Allabaculia) owned by the organiser, the 2nd Marquess of Rockingham.
- 11 October – American Revolution: Battle of Valcour Island – on Lake Champlain near Valcour Island, a British fleet led by Sir Guy Carleton defeats 15 American gunboats commanded by Brigadier General Benedict Arnold. Although nearly all of Arnold's ships are destroyed, the defense of Lake Champlain prevents a further British advance toward Albany, New York.
- 18 October – American Revolution: Battle of Pell's Point – troops of the American Continental Army resist a British and Hessian force in The Bronx.
- 28 October – American Revolution: Battle of White Plains – British forces arrive at White Plains, attack and capture Chatterton Hill from the Continental Army.
- 31 October – In his first speech before Parliament since the American Declaration of Independence, King George III acknowledges that all is not going well for Britain in the American Revolutionary War.
- 16 November – American Revolution: Battle of Fort Washington – Hessian soldiers under Lieutenant General Wilhelm von Knyphausen capture Fort Washington in New York from the Continental Army.
- 20 November – American Revolution: Battle of Fort Lee – Fort Lee in New Jersey is captured by the British forces.
- 26 December – American Revolution: The Continental Army led by Washington defeats a Hessian brigade at the Battle of Trenton.
- Undated
  - Member of Parliament David Hartley unsuccessfully introduces a motion to the House of Commons calling for the abolition of slavery.
  - The first commercial examples of the Watt steam engine are sold.

== Publications ==
- The first volume of Edward Gibbon's The History of the Decline and Fall of the Roman Empire (17 February).
- Adam Smith's economic text The Wealth of Nations (9 March).
- Augustus Toplady's hymn "Rock of Ages" (final versions, in The Gospel Magazine, March, and his Psalms and Hymns for Public and Private Worship, July).
- William Withering's The botanical arrangement of all the vegetables naturally growing in Great Britain, the first flora in English based on Linnaean taxonomy.
- Approximate date – folk song "The Lincolnshire Poacher" (first printed edition).

== Births ==
- 10 January – George Birkbeck, doctor, academic and philanthropist (died 1841)
- 16 January – Richard Onslow, archdeacon (died 1849)
- 17 January (baptism date) – Jane Porter, novelist (died 1850)
- 23 January – Howard Douglas, army general (died 1861)
- 12 February – Richard Mant, writer and cleric (died 1848)
- 16 February – Abraham Raimbach, engraver (died 1843)
- 23 February
  - John Walter, newspaper editor (died 1847)
  - Heneage Horsley, Scottish Episcopal dean (died 1847)
- 25 February – George William Tighe, expatriate (died 1837)
- 9 March – Thomas Evans, army general (died 1863)
- 12 March – Lady Hester Stanhope, archaeologist (died 1839)
- 20 March – Richard Temple-Nugent-Brydges-Chandos-Grenville, 1st Duke of Buckingham and Chandos, politician (died 1839)
- 23 March – Robert Eden Duncombe Shafto, politician (died 1848)
- 11 April – Macvey Napier, lawyer and encyclopedia editor (died 1847)
- 12 April – Henry Hobhouse, archivist (died 1854)
- 20 April
  - William Weston Young, Quaker businessman (died 1847)
- 25 April
  - Princess Mary, Duchess of Gloucester and Edinburgh, member of the royal family (died 1857)
  - Edward Solly, merchant and art collector (died 1844)
- 28 April – Charles Bennet, 5th Earl of Tankerville, politician (died 1859)
- 6 May – Stephen Rumbold Lushington, politician and administrator in British India (died 1868)
- 8 May – Edward Leveson-Gower, admiral (died 1853)
- 10 May – George Thomas Smart, musician (died 1867)
- 8 June – Thomas Rickman, architect and architectural antiquary (died 1841)
- 11 June – John Constable, landscape painter (died 1837)
- 21 June
  - Charles Horsfall, merchant and politician (died 1846)
  - William Wadd, surgeon and medical author (died 1829)
- 28 June – Charles Mathews, actor (died 1835)
- 3 July – Henry Parnell, 1st Baron Congleton, Anglo-Irish politician (died 1842)
- 18 July – John Struthers, Scottish poet (died 1853)
- 22 July – Etheldred Benett, geologist (died 1845)
- 30 July – Sir Edward Kerrison, 1st Baronet, army general (died 1853)
- 2 August – Thomas Assheton Smith II, landowner and sportsman (died 1858)
- 12 August – David Erskine, 2nd Baron Erskine, politician (died 1855)
- 18 August
  - Thomas Howard, 16th Earl of Suffolk, noble (died 1851)
  - Sir Robert Newman, 1st Baronet, politician (died 1848)
- 25 August – Thomas Bladen Capel, admiral (died 1853)
- 11 September – Thomas Arbuthnot, army general (died 1849)
- 18 September – Thomas Gleadowe-Newcomen, 2nd Viscount Newcomen, politician (died 1825)
- 21 September – John Fitchett, epic poet (died 1838)
- 6 October
  - James Duff, 4th Earl Fife, Scottish army general in Spanish service (died 1857)
  - James Stuart-Wortley, 1st Baron Wharncliffe, politician (died 1845)
- 13 October
  - Peter Barlow, mathematician (died 1862)
  - John Gibb, Scottish civil engineering contractor (died 1850)
- 14 October – Robert Townsend Farquhar, colonial administrator (died 1830)
- 20 October – John Rolls of The Hendre, judge (died 1837)
- 22 October – Edward Draper, army officer and colonial administrator (died 1841)
- 7 November – James Abercromby, 1st Baron Dunfermline, politician (died 1858)
- 10 November – Henry Seymour (Knoyle), politician (died 1849)
- 15 November – Aaron Manby, ironmaster and civil engineer (died 1850)
- 16 November – Mary Matilda Betham, diarist, scholar and poet (died 1852)
- 30 November – Bartholomew Frere, diplomat (died 1851)
- 12 December – Nicholas Conyngham Tindal, lawyer and politician (died 1846)
- 19 December – Lord Robert Somerset, army general (died 1842)

== Deaths ==
- 2 February – Francis Hayman, painter and illustrator (born 1708)
- 24 March – John Harrison, clockmaker (born 1693)
- 29 April – Edward Wortley Montagu, traveller and writer (born 1713)
- 13 June – William Battie, psychiatrist (born 1703 or 1704)
- 20 June – Benjamin Huntsman, inventor and manufacturer (born 1704)
- 7 July – Jeremiah Markland, classical scholar (born 1693)
- 17 July – Harriet Pelham-Holles, Duchess of Newcastle-upon-Tyne, widow of the Prime Minister (born 1701)
- 25 August – David Hume, Scottish philosopher (born 1711)
- 17 November – James Ferguson, Scottish astronomer (born 1710)

== See also ==
- 1776 in Wales
