= Lewis Hopkin =

Lewis Hopkin (c.1708–1771) was a Welsh craftsman and poet.

== Life ==
He was the son of Lewis Hopkin (died 1756) of Peterston-super-montem, Glamorgan, and his wife Joan Thomas. A carpenter who picked up other crafts, he moved as a young man to Hendre Ifan Goch in the parish of Llandyfodwg, Glamorgan, where he settled. He was active in trade and surveying, and the cultural life of Upper Glamorgan.

== Death ==
Hopkin died 17 November 1771, and was buried in Llandyfodwg churchyard. Two of his bardic pupils, Edward Evans and Edward Williams—Iolo Morganwg—wrote poems on his death.

== Works ==
In 1767 Hopkin, with Edward Evans, published a rhymed version of the Book of Ecclesiastes since published in editions of Evans's Works. Hopkin's translation of Chevy Chase and other poems were published in different numbers of the Eurgrawn of 1770. His poetical works were collected and published at Merthyr Tydvil in 1813, under the title Y Fel Gafod: sef Cywyddau, Englynion, a Chaniadau ar amryw achosion, gan y diweddar Lewis Hopkin, pris dau swllt. The editor was John Miles of Pencoed, Llanilid, Glamorganshire, son-in-law to Hopkin.

== Family ==
Hopkin married Margaret Bevan, from a Quaker background, and they had 11 children, of whom four became adults. His published works contain an English poem by a son, the Rev. Lewis Hopkin. Another son, Hopkin Hopkin (1737–1754), became famous as a dwarf.
