= 1772 in Great Britain =

Events from the year 1772 in Great Britain.

== Incumbents ==
- Monarch – George III
- Prime Minister – Frederick North, Lord North (Tory)

== Events ==
- 24 March – Royal Marriages Act 1772 requires the monarch's consent for the marriage of all members of the royal family.
- 28 May – Staffordshire and Worcestershire Canal open for traffic throughout from a junction with the Trent and Mersey Canal to the River Severn at Stourport. Engineered by James Brindley, this is the first British trunk canal completed and its dimensions determine the size of boat used throughout the narrow canal network (72 feet (22 m) by 7 feet (2.1 m)).
- 10 June – credit crisis of 1772 is triggered when, following the flight of their partner Alexander Fordyce to France, the London banking house of Neal, James, Fordyce and Down (which has been speculating in East India Company stock) suspends payment. The resultant panic causes other banks, particularly in Scotland, to fail, extends to Amsterdam and the Thirteen Colonies of British North America, and threatens the East India Company with bankruptcy.
- 22 June – Somersett's Case: Lord Mansfield, the Lord Chief Justice delivers the decision that slavery is not supported by the common law of England.
- 13 July – navigator James Cook sets out from Plymouth on HMS Resolution for a second Pacific voyage.
- 12 September – Daniel Rutherford demonstrates the method of distinguishing nitrogen from other gases.
- 21 September – Birmingham Canal Navigations main line open for traffic, linking Birmingham to the River Severn via the Staffordshire and Worcestershire Canal.
- 2 November – The Morning Post newspaper published for the first time.
- An appeal delivered in Norwich Cathedral for the newly-founded Norfolk and Norwich Hospital is the origin of the Norfolk and Norwich Festival.

== Births ==
- 19 April – David Ricardo, economist (died 1823)
- 22 April – George Cockburn, naval commander (died 1853)
- 20 May – William Congreve, rocket pioneer (died 1828)
- 8 June – Robert Stevenson, Scottish lighthouse engineer (died 1850)
- 21 October – Samuel Taylor Coleridge, poet and philosopher, (died 1834)

== Deaths ==
- 8 February – Augusta of Saxe-Gotha, Princess of Wales (born 1719)
- 22 March – John Canton, physicist (born 1718)
- 31 August – William Borlase, Cornish antiquary and naturalist (born 1695)
- 30 September – James Brindley, canal builder (born 1716)

== See also ==
- 1772 in Wales
