= Chevy (given name) =

Chevy is a given name and nickname which may refer to:

== People ==
- Chevy Chase (born 1943), American actor, comedian, screenwriter and producer
- Chevy Stevens (born 1973 as Rene Unischewski), Canadian author of thriller novels
- Chevy Stewart (born 2005), Australian rugby league footballer
- Chevy Woods (born 1981), American rapper, singer and songwriter

== Characters ==
- Chevy, a character in the British comic book series MPH

== See also ==
- Chevie Kehoe (born 1973), American white supremacist and convicted murderer
- Chevy (disambiguation)
