= Chevy (disambiguation) =

Chevy is short for Chevrolet.

Chevy may also refer to:

- Chevy (given name), a unisex given name.
- Cheviot Hills, Scotland, UK; also known as "Chevy" or "Chevy Hills"; where Chevy Chase, Scotland was located
- Chevy Commons, Flint, Michigan, USA

== See also ==
- Chevy Chase (disambiguation)
