= Lemuel Dole Nelme =

Lemuel Dole Nelme (born c1718 died 1786) was an English craftsman, now remembered for wide-reaching theories on language.

== Life ==
The son of a Leominster clothworker, he was apprenticed to Thomas Clarke, citizen and fishmonger 6 April 1732 and made free of the City of London in 1743. He was a maker of instruments and dealer in ships' merchandise of the eighteenth century. His son Lemuel Jones Nelme was baptized at King's Weighouse Chapel 19 August 1749. Nelme was in business in Exchange Alley in London around 1750. He held a Government post as Clerk in 1764, and participated in the Royal Society of Arts at the end of the 1760s. He was buried at Stepney 19 March 1786. His wife Sarah survived him. His will was proved in the Prerogative court of Canterbury on 19 Mar 1786. He mentions his grandfather John Dole of Rangeworthy, Gloucestershire. The lord of the Rangeworthy and Alderley manors was Matthew Hale, Chief Justice of King's Bench. Matthew Hale was an only child.

== Language and symbols ==
Nelme was the author of An essay towards an investigation of the origin and elements of language (1772), a speculative book on the origin of languages, and alphabet symbolism. Nelme was interested in Anglo-Saxon as proto-language, and compiled (or suggested the compilation of) an Anglo-Saxon dictionary. He is said to have deferred later to the theory of Rowland Jones on Celtic as proto-language. Johanna Drucker attributes to Clement of Alexandria's Stromateis some of his symbolic theory, outlines his version of Biblical history and the 'ol' ("all") key to symbols, and reproduces some of his illustrations.

== Works ==
- An Essay towards an Investigation of the Origin and Elements of Language and Letters, London, Printed by T. Spilsbury for S. Leacroft (1772); reprinted: R. C. Alston, ed., English Linguistics, 1500-1800: a Collection of Facsimile Reprints, No. 354. Menston, Scolar Press, (1972). ISBN 0-85417-869-4. Google Books.

== See also ==
- Linguistics
- Historical linguistics
- Proto-language
