= James Davies (schoolmaster) =

Welsh schoolmaster

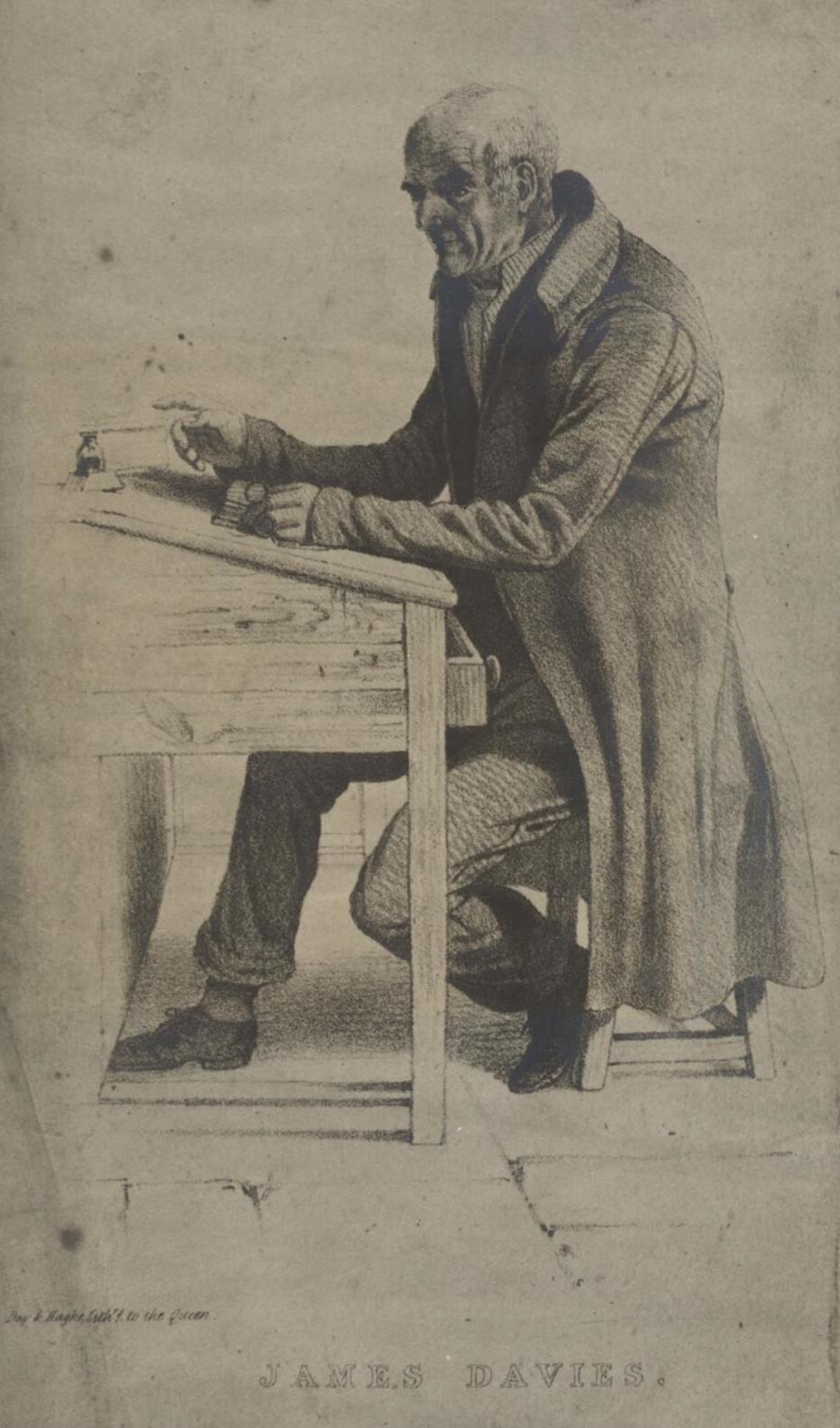
Portrait of James Davies (4674063)

James Davies (1765 - 1849) was a Welsh schoolmaster. His parents, Edward and Judith Davies, were Monmouthshire farmers. As a boy he attended Llangattock Lingoed school, before entering employment as a Lawyer's assistant. He did not remain the position for long, instead taking up weaving as a profession. In 1796 he married, but it was an unhappy marriage, and he left to become a pedlar for a while. After his wife's death he moved to Usk, and for a few years earned a living as a shopkeeper. In 1812 he took up a schoolmaster position at Usk School, before in 1815 opening a new school at Devauden. He is described as being a stern disciplinarian, but was also a generous man, and provided Bibles and other books at his own expense. He held strong religious beliefs, and it would seem thus, the school-house eventually became a 'chapel-of-ease' (where he served as a clerk), and a new school (the 'James Davies School') was built.

Returning to Llangattock-Lingoed in 1848, he took charge of his old school there, despite being now 83 years of age. He died Llangattock-Lingoed the following year.
