= Henry Parry (priest) =

Welsh clergyman and antiquarian

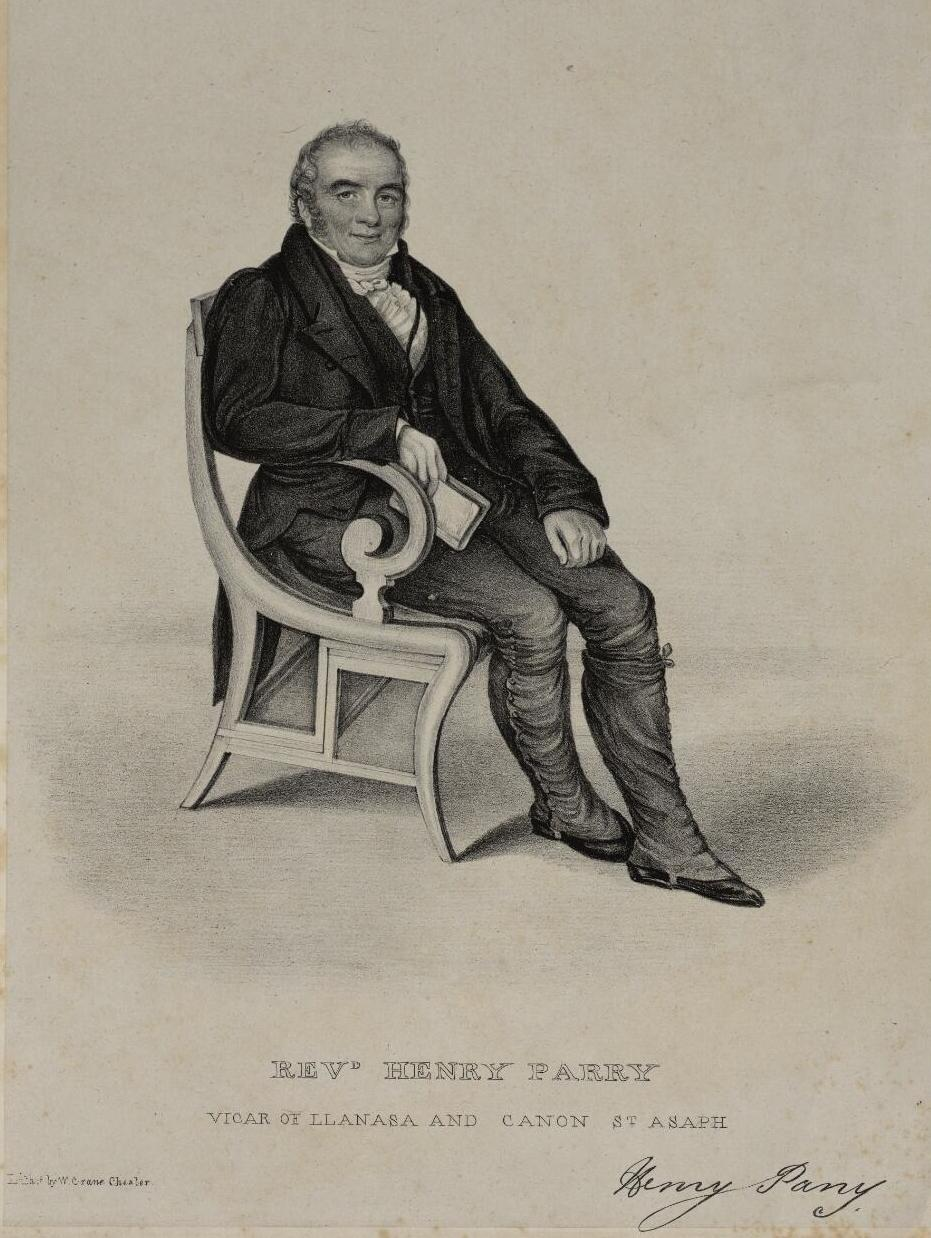
Henry Parry

Henry Parry (c.1766 – 17 December 1854) was a Welsh clergyman and antiquarian.

== Life ==
Parry was the son of Henry Parry, from Llanuwchllyn in Merionethshire, Wales and was educated at Jesus College, Oxford (matriculating on 1 June 1786, when he was recorded as being 20 years old, and obtaining a Bachelor of Arts degree in 1790). After his ordination as a priest, he was vicar of Llanasa, Flintshire from 1798 to 1854. In addition, he was a rural dean, and was made a canon of St Asaph's Cathedral in 1833. In addition to his parish work, he was active in eisteddfods and was an antiquarian; he also edited the second edition of the Grammatica Britannica by John Davies of Mallwyd, and this was published in 1809 (212 years after the first edition). Parry died on 17 December 1854.
