= Maurice Morgann =

18th-century British colonial official

Maurice Morgann (1725–1802) was a colonial administrator and Shakespearean literary scholar. He is best known for An Essay on the Dramatic Character of Sir John Falstaff.

== Colonial administrator ==
Morgann was born in Blaenbylan, Pembrokeshire, but little is known about his family or education, partly because at his request his executors destroyed all his personal papers after his death. He was established in London by 1756 when he was appointed to the sinecure post of Deputy Weigher and Teller at the Royal Mint. In 1757 he produced his first published work, An Inquiry Regarding the Nature and End of a National Militia. This pamphlet promoted Pitt's militia bill and reflected Tory opposition to a standing army and increased taxation.

From 1762, Morgann served as personal secretary and political adviser to the Earl of Shelburne, who served as President of the Board of Trade the following year. When Shelburne returned to office as Secretary of State for the South in July 1766, Morgann became one of his four under-secretaries and was given another sinecure, the post of secretary of the Province of New Jersey in November. In 1767, he was appointed special envoy of the Privy Council to Canada and visited Quebec in 1768.

Morgann argued for the toleration of Catholicism in the Canadian province and thus contributed to the formulation of the Quebec Act of 1774. He was also opposed to the slave trade, believing it would bring "terror and destruction" in America. These views were expressed in his Plan for the Abolition of Slavery in the West Indies (1772).

In 1782 Morgann embarked to New York with the aim of reuniting the colonies and Great Britain. Congress refused to receive him and it is possible that Morgann's report of the situation in America convinced Shelburne, now Prime Minister, to conclude the treaty with the American Commissioners in Paris which recognized the independence of the former colonies.

Morgann returned to England in 1783 and he retired from active duty under Shelburne in 1786. In 1795 he published his Considerations on the Present Internal and External Condition of France. This work called for an alliance between the United States and Britain to meet the threat of French radicalism which Morgann considered to be a dangerous form of anarchy. His analysis met with the approval of Richard Brinsley Sheridan.

He died unmarried in March 1802.

== Literary critic ==
An Essay on the Dramatic Character of Sir John Falstaff was published in 1777. It belonged to a genre of criticism, well-established at the time, that defended a Shakespeare character against charges of immorality. In this character study, Morgann contradicted Dr Johnson's view of Falstaff as a drunken coward unworthy of admiration. Morgann argued that it was Shakespeare's intention to gain sympathy from the audience for Falstaff at the expense of Prince Hal. Falstaff was in reality a good-natured man of true courage and a coward only in appearance. When he is robbed at Gads Hill, for example, Falstaff does not flee "until he had been deserted by his companions, and had even afterwards exchanged blows with his assailants".

Morgann summarises the complexity of Falstaff: "he is a character made up by Shakespeare wholly of incongruities; - a man at once young and old, enterprising and fat, a dupe and a wit, harmless and wicked, weak in principle and resolute by constitution, cowardly in appearance and brave in reality; a knave without malice, a lyar without deceit; and a knight, a gentleman and a soldier, without either dignity, decency or honour".

According to Boswell, Johnson derided the premise of Morgann's Essay: "Why, Sir, we shall have the man come forth again; and as he has proved Falstaff to be no coward, he may prove Iago to be a very good character". The work proved, however, to influence greatly the literary criticism of Henry IV, Part I and it inspired the literary approaches of Edward Dowden and A. C. Bradley in particular. Edward Elgar's interpretation of the character for his symphonic poem, Falstaff (1913), also owed much to Morgann's character study.

== Bibliography ==
- Cornish, Rory T. (2004). "Morgann, Maurice (1725–1802)". Oxford Dictionary of National Biography (online ed.). Oxford University Press. doi:10.1093/ref:odnb/19246. (Subscription, Wikipedia Library access or UK public library membership required.)
- Elgar, Edward (1 September 1913). "Falstaff". The Musical Times. 54 (847): 575–579. doi:10.2307/908045. eISSN 2397-5318. ISSN 0027-4666. JSTOR 908045.
- Fineman, Daniel A., ed. (1972). Maurice Morgann: Shakespearean Criticism. Oxford: Clarendon Press. ISBN 0-19-812015-X.
- Vickers, Brian (1982). "The Emergence of Character Criticism, 1774–1800". In Wells, Stanley (ed.). Characterization in Shakespeare. Shakespeare Survey. Vol. 34. Cambridge: Cambridge University Press. pp. 11–22. doi:10.1017/CCOL0521232406.002. ISBN 9781139053112. S2CID 193378728 – via Cambridge Core.
