= Edward Evan =

Welsh poet

Edward Evan (Welsh: Edward Ifan; 8 July 1716 or March 1716 – 21 June 1798), sometimes known as Edward Evans, was a Welsh poet, remembered mainly because of his association with Iolo Morganwg. Evan was one of the 'Gramadegyddion' (Grammarians), a group of poets who influenced the cultural environment of South Wales during the 18th century.

Evan was a "bard according to the rites and ceremonies of the bards of Britain", and his pedigree was supposedly traced in one unbroken line to the ancient Druids and to have preserved the original manuscript of the Gododdin. He was pastor at the Old Meeting House, Aberdare, from 1772 to 1798, and is said to have 'devoted his time faithfully to his religious duties, to the satisfaction of a large number of people, who attended from the country from a distance of many miles'. He used the bardic names "Iorwerth ab Ioan" and "Iorwerth Gwynfardd Morganwg".

He published a Welsh translation of S. Bourne's Catechism (1757), Book of Ecclesiastes done into Verse, by E. E. and Lewis Hopkin (Bristol, 1767), An Address delivered before the Association of Ministers at Dref Wen, near Newcastle Emlyn, with two Hymns (1775). Evan died on 21 June 1798, the day on which he had arranged to meet the other bards of the Chair of Glamorgan. Most of his poetry was published posthumously. His poetical works were collected and edited by his son, Rhys (1778–1869), who took the English version of his surname, "Evans". They were published n Merthyr in 1804, under the title Caniadau Moesol a Duwiol (Moral and Godly Songs) There were several later editions, published under the title Afalau'r Awen (Fruits of the Muse) in 1816, 1837 and 1874. The subsequent popularity of Edward Evan's work has been ascribed to the increased interest in Radical politics as a result of the industrialisation of South Wales and particularly the rise of Chartism.

== Bibliography ==
- James C. Stewart, In Search of the Last Bard: the Life and Legacy of Edward Evan. Cynon Valley History Society, 2025. ISBN 9780953107667
