= Hopkin Bevan =

Welsh minister (1765-1839)

Hopkin Bevan (1765–1839) was a Welsh Calvinist Methodist minister and writer.

== Early life ==
Born 4 May 1765, his parents were Rees and Mary Bevan of Cilfwnwr, Llangyfelach in Glamorgan. As a boy he attended school in his hometown, and then was schooled in Swansea. He joined the Methodists in Gopa Fach in 1788 and began preaching about 1792.

== Career ==
Ordained in Llandeilo in the summer of 1811, he was among the first ordained Calvinist Methodist ministers. He was a minister at the Bethel chapel in Llangyfelach. His written works include; Ychydig Hanes neu Goffawdwriaeth (1838), Hymnau a Phenillion (1838), and his autobiography (1840). He died 29 December 1839, and was buried in Bethel chapel in Llangyfelach.
