= Howel Davies =

Welsh Methodist cleric (c. 1716 – 1770)

Howel Davies (c. 1716 – 13 January 1770) was a Welsh Methodist minister. Little is known about his early life, but by 1737 he is known to have been a schoolmaster at Talgarth. There he was converted by Howel Harris, and on Harris's advice he went to Llanddowror to study under Griffith Jones. In 1739 he was ordained deacon, and then a priest in 1740. He served initially at the church in Llandeilo Abercywyn, before moving in 1741 to Llys y Fran, Pembrokeshire. Along with Harris and Jones, he made a major contribution to the spread of Calvinistic Methodism in Pembrokeshire, so much so that he became known as "the Apostle of Pembrokeshire".

While Davies was preaching at Llechryd and Mounton, there were complaints about his conduct, especially his willingness to offer communion to visitors. In 1744 he married his first wife, Catherine Poyer, a wealthy heiress, and they lived at Parke near Whitland. When she died he married Elizabeth White, and moved to live at her home at Prendergast. Having accompanied Selina Hastings, Countess of Huntingdon, on a tour of Wales, he was invited to preach at her chapels in England, where he made the acquaintance of George Whitefield, who was impressed by his preaching.

His published works include sermons published by Rhys Thomas of Carmarthen, one under the title "Llais y Durtur", and another in 1768 under the title "Llais y Priodfab".
