= John Bird (artist) =

Welsh landscape artist

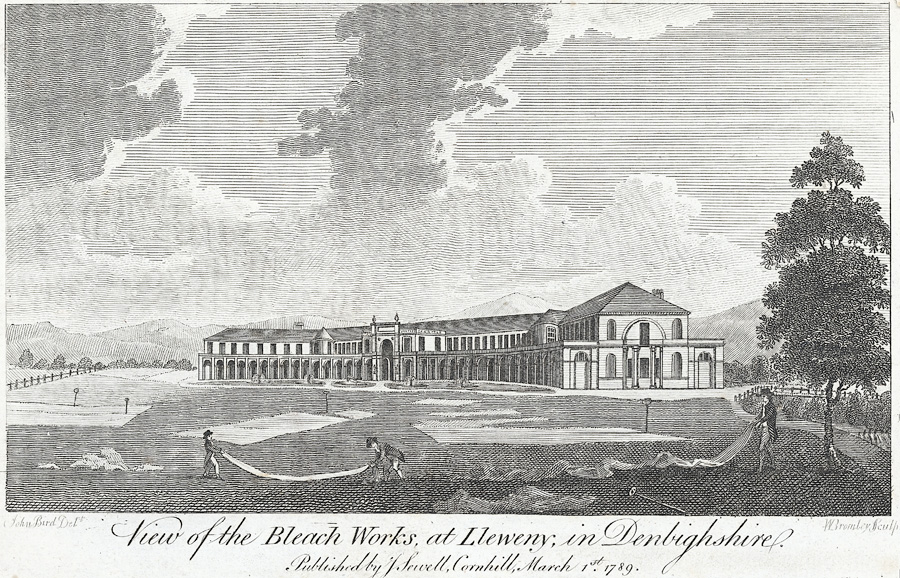
One of his works.

John Bird (1768-1829) was a Welsh landscape artist. He was born in Cardiff, where some of his works may be seen in the National Museum of Wales. Several of his drawings were published in 'Principal Seats of the Nobility' in 1787.

He died in Whitby in 1829.
