= Daniel Evans (minister) =

Welsh clergyman

Daniel Evans (16 January 1774 – 3 March 1835), was an independent minister at Mynyddbach, Glamorganshire, Wales.

== Life ==
Evans was born at Maindala, Eglwyswrw, Pembrokeshire, 16 January 1774. As a youth he was fond of frequenting prayer-meetings in private houses. At an early age he became church member, and soon afterwards began preaching with great enthusiasm from house to house. He thus trained himself for the future work, and became very successful as a missionary.

His first settlement was at Llanwrtyd, Brecknockshire, as co-pastor with the Rev. Isaac Price, from 1796 to 1799. He went in 1799 to Bangor, where his congregation had but twenty-five members, who were not able to give him 10l. a year. He often wondered what could have brought him to so poor a place, but thanked God that he had a little private means. He enlarged his own congregation and established seven new ones in the immediate neighbourhood, several of them self-supporting.

In 1808 he removed to Mynyddbach, where he was again very successful. During six months, in 1828–9, he added no fewer than 650 to the membership of his churches. He died at Mynyddbach 3 March 1835.

== Works ==
His published works are (all Welsh):

1. 'On the Salvation of Children.'
2. 'Reasons for Dissent.'
3. 'Memoir of Rev. Lewis Rees' (father of Dr. Abraham Rees, the encyclopædist)
4. 'Memoir of Rev. J. Davies, Alltwen.' 5. 'Memoir of Rev. W. Evans, Cwmllynfell.' 6. 'Memoir of Rev. J. Davies, Llansamlet.'
5. A Hymn-book.
6. 'The Golden Cistern.'
7. 'The Basket (Cawell) of Unleavened Bread.'
8. 'Ten Sermons' (posthumous).
