= James Davies (Baptist minister) =

James Davies (1767? – 16 May 1860) was a Welsh Baptist minister from Clydey, Pembrokeshire. As a boy he attended school in Carmarthen, and services at Pant Teg Church (Newcastle Emlyn). By 1793 he was living in the Ffynnonhenry area, and was ordained minister there in 1794, and also at Horeb church, Rhydargaeau. However, during the schism of 1799 the two churches parted company, Ffynnonhenry remaining Calvinistic, and Rhydargaeau becoming a General Baptist church under Davies's charge.

He is known to have supported the Welsh Wesleyan mission to west Wales, and to have preached together with Moses Williams (d. 1819) to the Welsh Wesleyans at Carmarthen in 1806.

Around 1820, Ffynnonhenry invited him to return, to become their joint pastor with David Evans (1778-1866), and he remained there for the next 40 years.

He died in Ffynnonbumsaint, aged 93, in 1860, and was buried in Ffynnonhenry burial ground.
