= John Bryan (Wesleyan Methodist minister) =

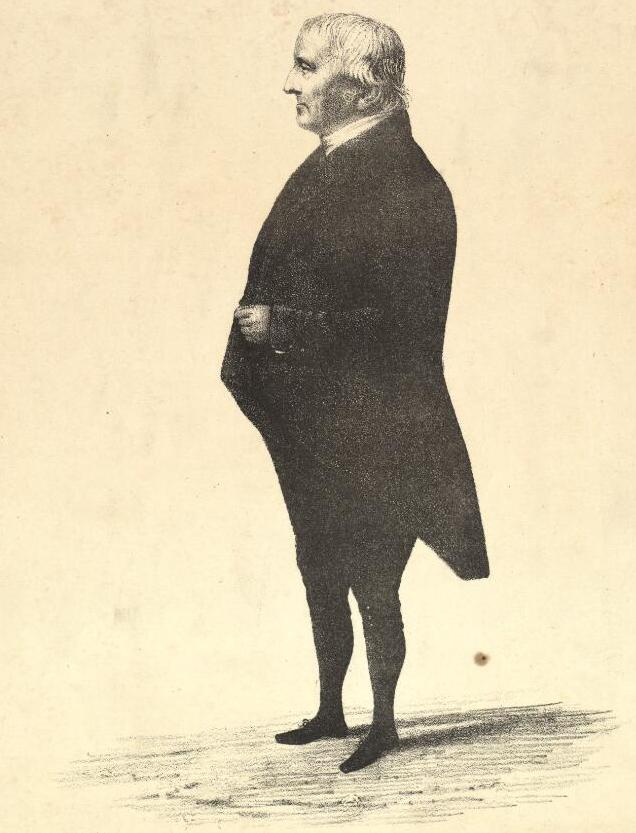
Portrait of John Bryan (4671299) (cropped)

John Bryan (1776 – 28 May 1856) was a Welsh Wesleyan Methodist minister. He was born, and lived, in Llanfyllin until he was about 12 years of age. He spent a number of the subsequent years living in Shrewsbury, and in other areas of North Wales, before moving to Chester in 1798 to work as an assistant in Misses Williams' (daughters of Richard Williams) drapery business. Whilst in Chester he initially attended the Welsh Calvinistic Methodist church, but later joined the Methodists at the Octagon, the Wesleyan Methodist chapel. Soon after, he began preaching as local preacher, before, in 1801 becoming an ordained Wesleyan Methodist minister, touring various circuits in Wales until 1815, when he began touring on circuits in England. In 1824 he left the ministry for a period, to run a grocery and tea-merchant business in the Leeds area. The worsening health of his wife influenced his decision to subsequently return to Wales, to continue with his grocery business in the Caernarvon area, and where he again served as a local preacher, until within a few weeks of his death.

Bryan was responsible for translating some of John and Charles Wesley's hymns into the Welsh language.

He died on 28 May 1856.
