= Chevy Chase Arcade =

- U.S. National Register of Historic Places
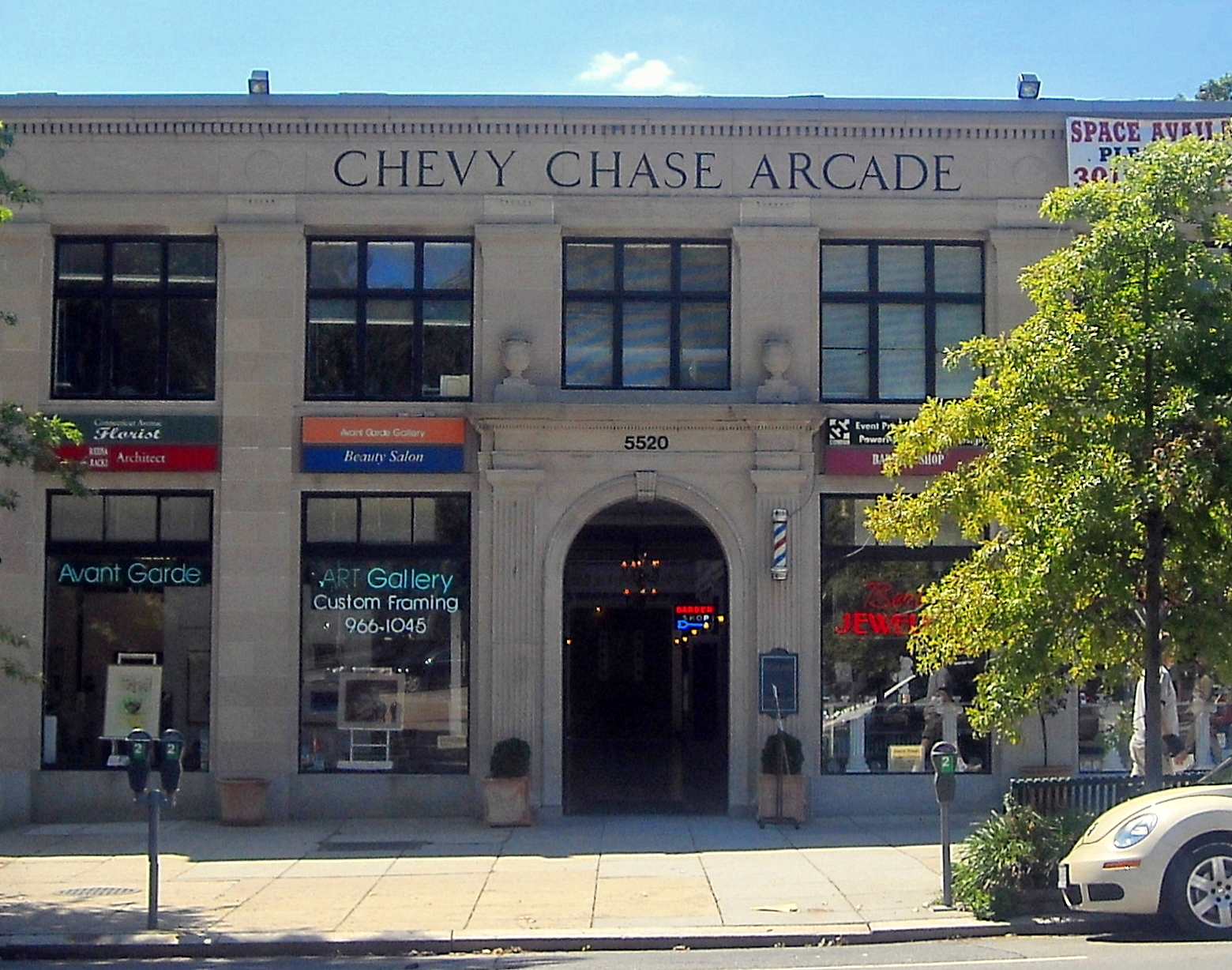
- Chevy Chase Arcade in 2008

- Location within District of Columbia
- Location: 5520 Connecticut Ave. NW; Washington, D.C.
- Coordinates: 38°57′49.3″N 77°4′31.1″W
- Built: 1925
- Architect: Louis R. Moss
- Architectural style: Classical Revival
- NRHP reference No.: 03000730
- Added to NRHP: August 4, 2003

The Chevy Chase Arcade is an historic structure located in the Chevy Chase neighborhood in the Northwest Quadrant of Washington, D.C. It was listed on the National Register of Historic Places in 2003.

== History ==
The building is a unique example of a small-scale commercial arcade in Washington. Built in 1925, it is located along Chevy Chase's commercial strip, Connecticut Avenue. The area was planned by the Chevy Chase Land Company as one of four commercial areas along the street that are separated by apartment blocks. The Arcade is an example of providing elegant and convenient shopping venues in the city's prestigious suburban neighborhoods.

== Architecture ==
The Classical Revival building was designed by Louis R. Moss. The exterior features a limestone façade with monumental pilasters, large windows to display the merchant's wares to pedestrians as they pass by and an arched entry way to the central arcade of shops and the offices on the second floor. The interior of the building features a vaulted ceiling, clerestory lighting, a black and white marble floor, plaster ornamental moldings and sylvan bas-relief panels.

== See also ==
- Chevy Chase Theater
