= Richard Nanney =

Richard Nanney (1691–1767) was an 18th-century evangelical priest in north Wales.

== Life ==
Nanney, who was born in 1691, studied at Jesus College, Oxford, from 1710 onwards, obtaining a Bachelor of Arts degree in 1714 and a Master of Arts degree in 1718 or 1719. After his ordination, he was appointed vicar of Clynnog Fawr, Gwynedd in 1718 and rector of Llanaelhaearn in 1725, and was also a canon of Bangor Cathedral. He was a strong supporter (in word and in deed) of the circulating schools organised by Griffith Jones, with the school in Clynnog often meeting in the church. He was influenced by the Methodist revival and the contrast between the "apathy of his early years" and the "fruitful piety" of later life was noted. It was recorded that crowds of people came to hear him preach, from the parish and from further afield. He died in 1767.
