= Thomas Nuthall =

English lawyer and politician

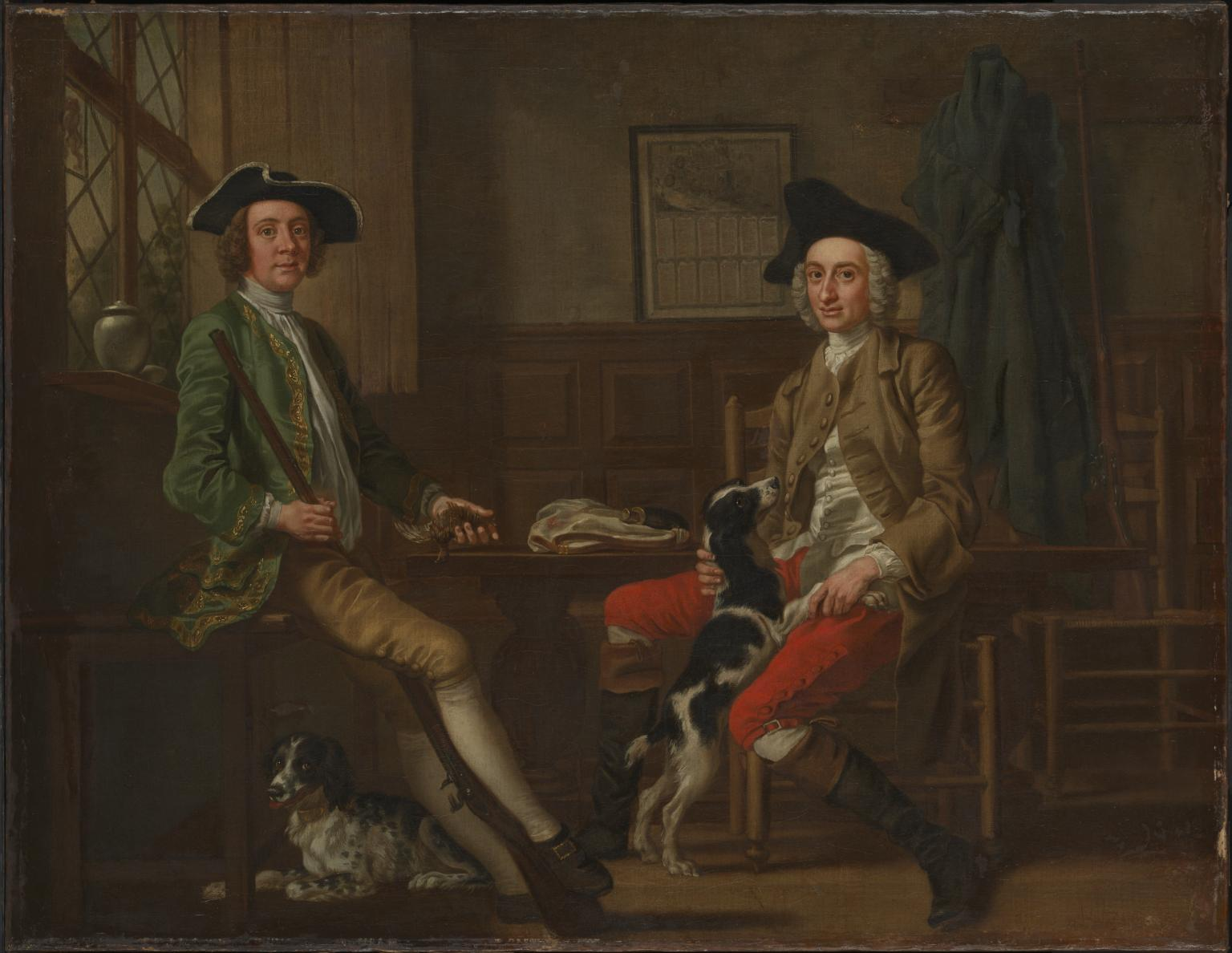
Thomas Nuthall (right) with his friend Hambleton Custance, 1748

Thomas Nuthall (died 7 March 1775) was an English politician and attorney who played an historic role in the ministries of William Pitt, Lord Bute, and Lord Rockingham. He was probably from Norfolk, and his first appointments came from Robert Walpole, who placed him in the Excise Office in 1740. By 1749, Nuthall was the receiver of hackney coaches.

Horace Walpole used Nuthall to get Margaret Nicoll freed to marry George Walpole in 1751, but he thought Nuthall corrupt and mistrusted him. In 1757, Nuthall married Susan, the widow of his friend Hambleton Custance. By the time of his death, he had remarried, so the mother of Nuthall's legitimate son, Robert, could be either woman. (Nuthall had two bastard children as well.)

William Pitt became Nuthall's protector and sponsor in the 1750s, and his connection to the family would remain steadfast. Generally, Nuthall was employed as an intermediary or "ambassador" between various political factions and Pitt. His first service in this regard was between Pitt and Thomas Pelham on bringing down Lord Bute's government. In return for his service, Pitt obtained several offices for Nuthall, with the most telling in the long run being solicitor for the Treasury in 1765.

In 1766, he formed a legal partnership with John Skirrow, and Skirrow would later be Nuthall's executor. The same year, he went through long negotiations between Pitt and Rockingham to form a new government. This so-called "Nuthall interval" (Kilburn 289) dragged out a period of Parliamentary paralysis, as no bills could move forward. Soon after this, the first investigation into his shortcomings as an attorney began, and it appeared that he had been quite sloppy in his affairs, leaving much without proper authority.

His death was sudden. On 7 March 1775 his coach was attacked by a highwayman on Hounslow Heath. Nuthall returned fire on the robber, who then fled. When the coach came to Hounslow, Nuthall wrote a description of his attacker to be given to Sir John Fielding and then immediately died. After his death, auditing his accounts showed that Nuthall had been guilty of substantial malfeasance.
