= Milbourn Bloom =

Milbourn Bloom (died 1766) was a Welsh Independent minister. He may have been related to the Blooms of Castell Pigyn (Abergwili). The records of the Methodist Association (1743) describe him as a ‘public exhorter’ (i.e. itinerant), with charge of several locations south of the Towy. According to H.J. Hughes, 'Life of Howell Harris' Bloom soon (in September 1743) left the Methodist church, entering Independent ministry (being admitted a member of Pant Teg church, then under Christmas Samuel). Described as an "exhorter", he took charge of several local Methodist societies. After serving for a period as an ordained assistant to Christmas Samuel he is recorded as appointed pastor of Pen-y-Graig (1748 to 1757), and later of Gwernogle, and of Pentre-ty-Gwyn (1757). According to Thomas Morgan he died in 1766.
