= Richard Lathrop =

Richard Lathrop (1716 - 1764) was an English printer of books and ballads in Shrewsbury, England.

Lathrop was baptised in West Felton in Shropshire on 6 May 1716. He was the son of Robert Lathrop and Susannah Lathrop (née Scott).

Lathrop worked as a bookseller and printer in High Street in Shrewsbury between 1738 and 1747. It is believed that he acquired the business of John Rogers, who died in 1738. Lathrop was recorded as a 'master printer' in 1738 and was counted among the Freemen Combrethren of Saddlers on 22 June 1739. Lathrop worked in Shrewsbury around the same time as contemporaries Thomas Durston and Stafford Prys.

Lathrop was buried on 1 November 1764 at Old St Chads, Shrewsbury.
