= Avalon Theatre (Washington, D.C.) =

- U.S. National Register of Historic Places
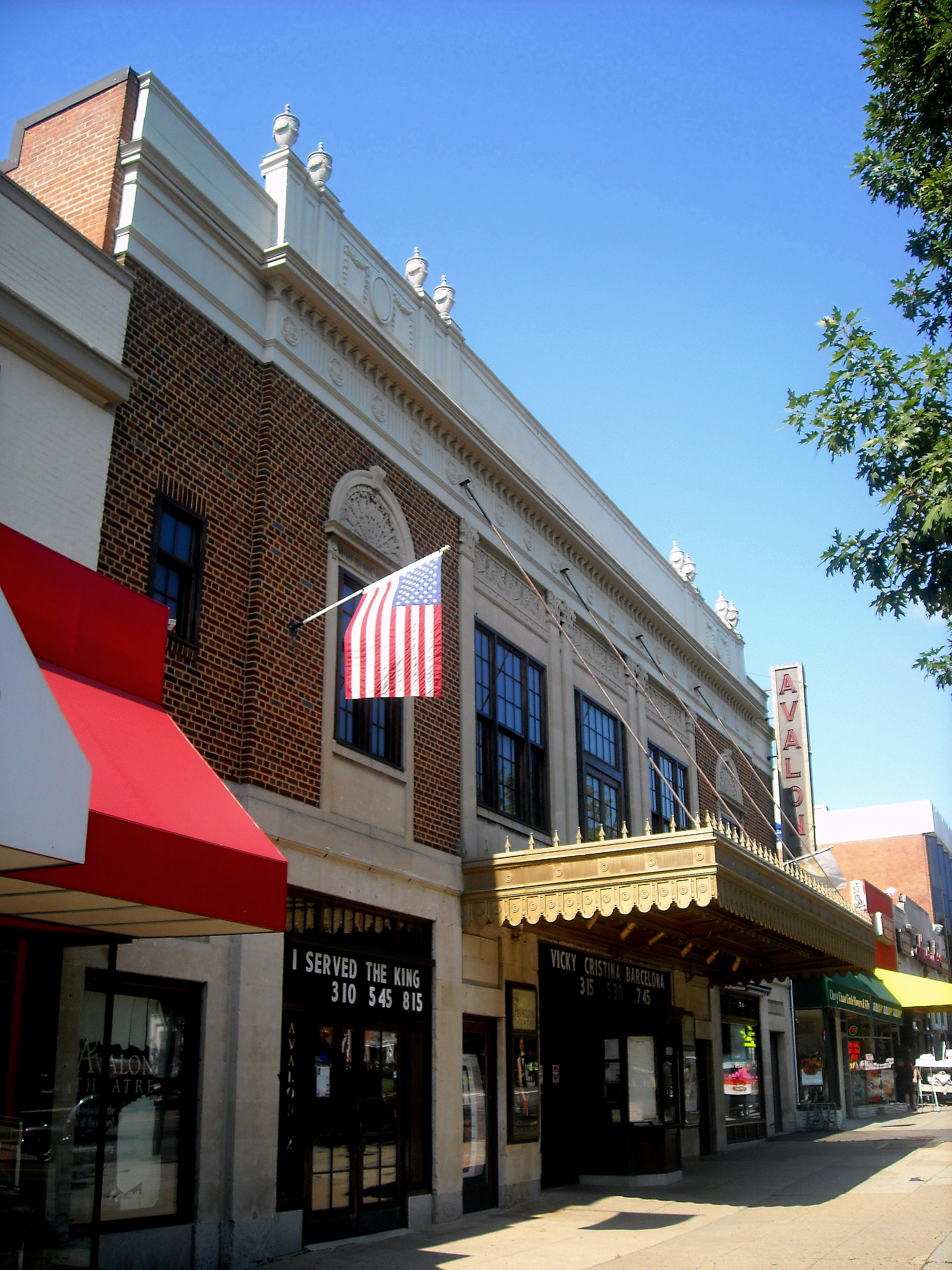

- Location within District of Columbia Location within the United States
- Location: 5612 Connecticut Ave. NW; Washington, D.C.
- Coordinates: 38°57′56″N 77°4′35″W
- Built: 1922
- Architect: Upman and Adams
- Architectural style: Classical Revival
- Website: www.theavalon.org
- NRHP reference No.: 96000734
- Added to NRHP: July 18, 1996

The Avalon Theatre, formerly Chevy Chase Theatre, is an historic structure located in the Chevy Chase neighborhood in the Northwest Quadrant of Washington, D.C. The Classical Revival building was designed by the architectural firm of Upman and Adams and completed in 1922. The Avalon is a rare example of a neighborhood movie house in Washington; it is the oldest in continuous use. It was listed on the National Register of Historic Places in 1996.

As of 2021, it hosts the Washington metropolitan area's third-largest commercial movie theater screen, after the National Air & Space Museum and the AFI Silver in Silver Spring, Maryland.

== See also ==
- Chevy Chase Arcade
