= Evan Lloyd (poet) =

Evan Lloyd (15 April 1734 (baptised) – 26 January 1776) was a Welsh poet.

== Life ==
Lloyd, who was baptised on 15 April 1734 in Llanycil, Merionethshire, Wales, was educated at Ruthin School before matriculating at Jesus College, Oxford in 1751. After graduating with a Bachelor of Arts degree in 1754 and a Master of Arts degree three years later, Lloyd was ordained and served curate of St Mary's Rotherhithe, London. In 1763, he became vicar of Llanfair Dyffryn Clwyd, Wales, but he remained in London (where he enjoyed the delights of the London social life) and employed a curate in his place. Gout and rheumatism affected his later years, and he died on 26 January 1776.

== Works ==
In 1766 Lloyd published three satires in verse. One (The Powers of the Pen) attacked literary critics. Another (The Curate) bewailed the position of curates and condemned bishops. The third (The Methodist) not only showed Lloyd's hatred of Methodism but also defamed William Price, a former High Sheriff of Merionethshire and a powerful landowner in Lloyd's part of Wales. Price sued for libel, leading to Lloyd being fined and imprisoned for a short time, although his imprisonment led to his befriending John Wilkes, a fellow inmate. Wilkes and another friend, David Garrick, attempted to obtain further church positions for Lloyd but this was largely unsuccessful, with the Bishop of St Asaph, Jonathan Shipley, blaming Lloyd's satires. Nevertheless, Lloyd wrote an Epistle to David Garrick (1773), though this led to Lloyd being mocked in A Whipping for the Welsh Parson by William Kenrick later the same year.
