= Morgan Rhys =

Welsh hymn-writer (1716–1779)

- Born: 1 April 1716; Cilycwm, Wales
- Died: 9 August 1779 (aged 63); Llanfynydd, Wales
- Occupation: Schoolmaster

Morgan Rhys (1 April 1716 – 9 August 1779) was a Welsh hymn-writer.

Rhys was born in Cilycwm as one of six or seven children of Rhys and Anne Lewis.

At first one of Griffith Jones's travelling schoolmasters, he afterwards kept school on his own account at Capel Isaac, near Llandeilo, living in a cottage on Cwm Gwenywdy farm, in the parish of Llan Fynydd. He early joined the Calvinistic Methodists, and was a member and preacher of the Cilycwm Society.

He first appeared as a hymn-writer in 1760, when twenty-two hymns from his pen were published at Carmarthen. In 1764 a second edition of this collection appeared, under the title Golwg o ben Nebo (A Prospect from the Summit of Nebo); in 1773 a third followed, and in 1775 a fourth, all at Carmarthen. Further editions were published in 1808 (Carmarthen), 1831 (Merthyr), and 1841 (Aberystwyth). In 1767 another collection, entitled Golwg ar ddull y byd hwn yn myned heibio (A Prospect of how the fashion of this world passeth away), was printed at Carmarthen, while a third, issued in 1770 or 1771 from the same press, bore the title Golwg ar y ddinas noddfa (A Prospect of the city of refuge). In 1770 Rhys published an elegy on several prominent Methodist divines (Carmarthen); Rowlands also mentions three collections of religious verse by him, which he assigns to 1774.

Rhys died in Llanfynydd, and was buried at Llan Fynydd.
