= Rowland Jones =

Rowland Jones (1722–1774) was a Welsh lawyer and philologist of radical linguistic views.

== Life ==
He was the second son of John Williams of Bachellyn, Llanbedrog, Carnarvonshire, where he was born. He spent some time as clerk in the office of his father, who was a solicitor, but he then obtained a similar situation in London. He married a young Welsh heiress, and was enrolled as a member of the Inner Temple 26 October 1751. He is usually described as of Broom Hall, near Pwllheli, Carnarvonshire. He died in Hamilton Street, Hanover Square, London, early in 1774, aged 52. He left three children, two daughters, Elizabeth and Ann, and a son, Rowland.

== Works ==
Jones published:

- ‘The Origin of Language and Nations, Hieroglyfically, Etymologically, and Topographically defined and fixed, after the method of an English, Celtic, Greek, and Latin-English Lexicon. Together with an Historical Preface, an Hieroglyfical Definition of Characters, a Celtic General Grammar, and various other matters of Antiquity. Treated of in a Method entirely new,’ London, 1764. This work attempts to prove that Welsh was the primeval language. Also ‘Postscript’ to the work, often bound with it, London, 1767.
- ‘Hieroglyfic: or a Grammatical Introduction to an Universal Hieroglyfic Language; consisting of English Signs and Voices, with a definition of all the Parts of the English, Welsh, Greek, and Latin Languages, some Physical, Metaphysical, and Moral Cursory Remarks on the Nature, Properties, and Rights of Men and Things, and Rules and Specimens for Composing an Hieroglyfic Vocabulary of the Signs or Figures as well as the Sounds of Things upon Rational and Philosophical Principles and the Primitive Meaning of Names,’ London, 1768.
- ‘The Philosophy of Words,’ London, 1769.
- ‘The Circles of Gomer, or an Essay towards an Investigation and Introduction of the English, as an Universal Language, upon first Principles of Speech, according to its Hieroglyfic Signs, Argrafic Archetypes and superior Pretensions to Originality; a retrieval of Original Knowledge; and a Reunion of Nations and Opinions on the like Principles, as well as the Evidence of Ancient Writers; with an English Grammar, some Illustrations of the Subjects of the Author's late Essays, and other interesting Discoveries,’ London, 1771. Jones subscribed to the theory, not original to him, that the Biblical Gomer was the ancestor of the Celts; and that he had retained knowledge given to Adam of the essential meanings of letter forms.
- ‘The Io Triads: or the Tenth Muse, wherein the Origin, Nature, and Connection of the Sacred Symbols, Sounds, Words, Ideas, are Discovered,’ &c., London, 1773. It contains attacks on the linguistic theories of Lemuel Dole Nelme (which are related to his) and of John Locke.
