= Charles Moss (bishop of Bath and Wells) =

English bishop (died 1802)

The Right Reverend Charles Moss
- Bishop of Bath and Wells
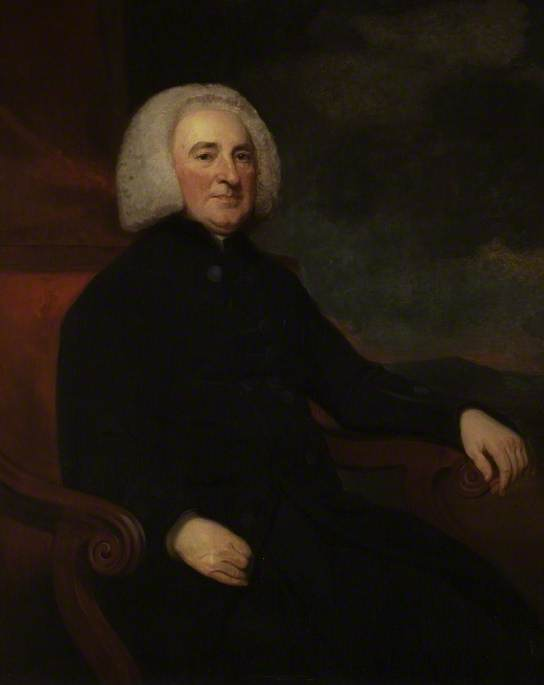
- Church: Church of England
- Province: Canterbury
- Diocese: Bath and Wells
- Elected: 1774
- Term ended: 1802
- Predecessor: Edward Willes
- Successor: Richard Beadon
- Other posts: Bishop of St David's (1766–1774); Chaplain to the King (1758–1766)

Personal details
- Born: 3 January 1712 Postwick, Norfolk
- Died: 13 April 1802 (aged 90) London
- Buried: Grosvenor Chapel
- Denomination: Anglican
- Education: Caius College, Cambridge

Charles Moss (3 January 1711/12 – 13 April 1802) was an Anglican clergyman who served as Bishop of St David's from 1766 to 1774 and Bishop of Bath and Wells from 1774 to 1802.

== Biography ==
Born in Postwick, Norfolk, England, Moss was son of William Moss, a grazier and large landowner of Postwick. He was educated under Mr Reddington at Norwich School and at Gonville and Caius College, Cambridge. He graduated BA in 1731, was ordained by Thomas Gooch (Master of Caius College and Bishop of Bristol) at Bristol in 1737, and was a fellow of Caius from 1735 to 1739.

Moss served as prebendary of Warminster, (1738–1740) and of Hurstbourne and Burbage, Diocese of Salisbury, (1740–1786); as residential canon of Salisbury, 1746–1786; Archdeacon of Colchester, St. Paul's Cathedral, London, (1749–1766). In 1752 he was elected a Fellow of the Royal Society and served as their vice-president from 1766 to 1768.

From 1758 to 1766, Moss was a Chaplain to the King. Moss also served as rector of St George's, Hanover Square, London beginning in 1759 and remained in that post when he was appointed Bishop of St David's in 1766. He was translated to Bath and Wells in 1774, remaining in that post until his death in 1802. As Bishop of Bath and Wells, he was one of the three bishops to consecrate William White and Samuel Provoost, the second and third American Episcopal bishops, respectively, in 1787.

Moss died in London and was buried at Grosvenor Chapel, South Audley Street, London.

== Family ==
He married Mary, daughter of Sir Thomas Hales, of Beaksbourne, 3rd Bt., according to that family's entry in Burke's Extinct Baronetcies. Out of a fortune of £140,000, he bequeathed £20,000 to his only daughter, wife of John King, and the remaining £120,000 to his only surviving son, Dr. Charles Moss, a graduate of Christ Church, Oxford (B.A. 1783 and D.D. 1797), and chaplain of the House of Commons in 1789, whom his father had appointed archdeacon of Carmarthen, January 1767, and archdeacon of St. David's in the December of the same year. He also gave him the sub-deanery of Wells immediately after his translation in 1774, and the precentorship in 1799, and three prebendal stalls in succession; in 1807 he was made bishop of Oxford, and died on 16 December 1811.

== Notes ==
=== Attribution ===
This article incorporates text from a publication now in the public domain: Venables, Edmund (1894). "Moss, Charles". In Lee, Sidney (ed.). Dictionary of National Biography. Vol. 39. London: Smith, Elder & Co.

Church of England titles
Preceded by Robert Lowth	Bishop of St David's; 1766–1774	Succeeded by James Yorke
Preceded by Edward Willes	Bishop of Bath and Wells; 1774–1802	Succeeded by Richard Beadon
