= Other Windsor, 4th Earl of Plymouth =

British peer

The Right Honourable The Earl of Plymouth DL

Custos Rotulorum of Flintshire
- In office 1753–1771
- Preceded by: The Lord Archer
- Succeeded by: The Lord Kenyon

Personal details
- Born: Other Lewis Windsor; 12 May 1731
- Died: 21 April 1771 (aged 39)
- Spouse: Hon. Catherine Archer (m. 1750; died 1771)
- Relations: Thomas Lewis (grandfather)
- Children: 8
- Parent: Other Windsor, 3rd Earl of Plymouth
- Education: Eton College
- Alma mater: Queen's College, Oxford

Other Lewis Windsor, 4th Earl of Plymouth DL (12 May 1731 – 21 April 1771) was a British peer, styled Lord Windsor until 1732.

== Early life ==
Windsor was born on 12 May 1731. He was the son of Other Windsor, 3rd Earl of Plymouth and Elizabeth Lewis. At the age of one, he succeeded his father as Earl of Plymouth.

His paternal grandparents were Other Windsor, 2nd Earl of Plymouth, and the former Elizabeth Whitley. In 1736, his maternal grandfather, Thomas Lewis, died, after naming Plymouth as the heir to his estates.

Plymouth was educated at Eton and Queen's College, Oxford, graduating BA.

== Career ==
In March 1750, Plymouth was appointed Constable of Flint Castle, Comptroller of the records in the counties of Chester and Flint, and Comptroller of the Pleas, Fine and Amerciaments in county Caernarvon. His degree was promoted to MA by seniority in July.

In 1753, Plymouth was appointed Custos Rotulorum of Flintshire, and in 1754 as Lord Lieutenant of Glamorgan. He was also made a deputy lieutenant of Worcestershire in 1757.

== Personal life ==
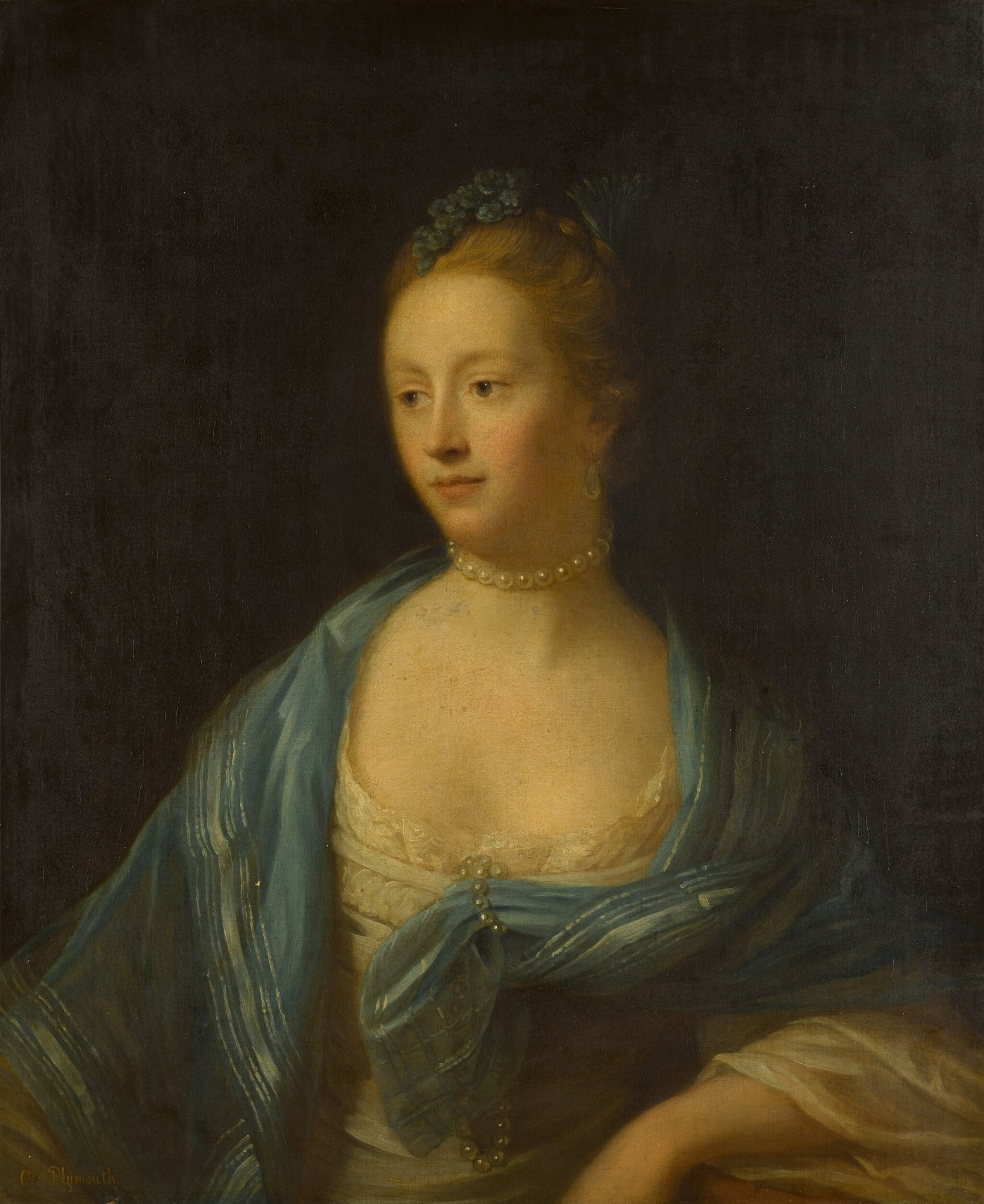
Portrait of his wife, Catherine, Countess of Plymouth, by Allan Ramsay

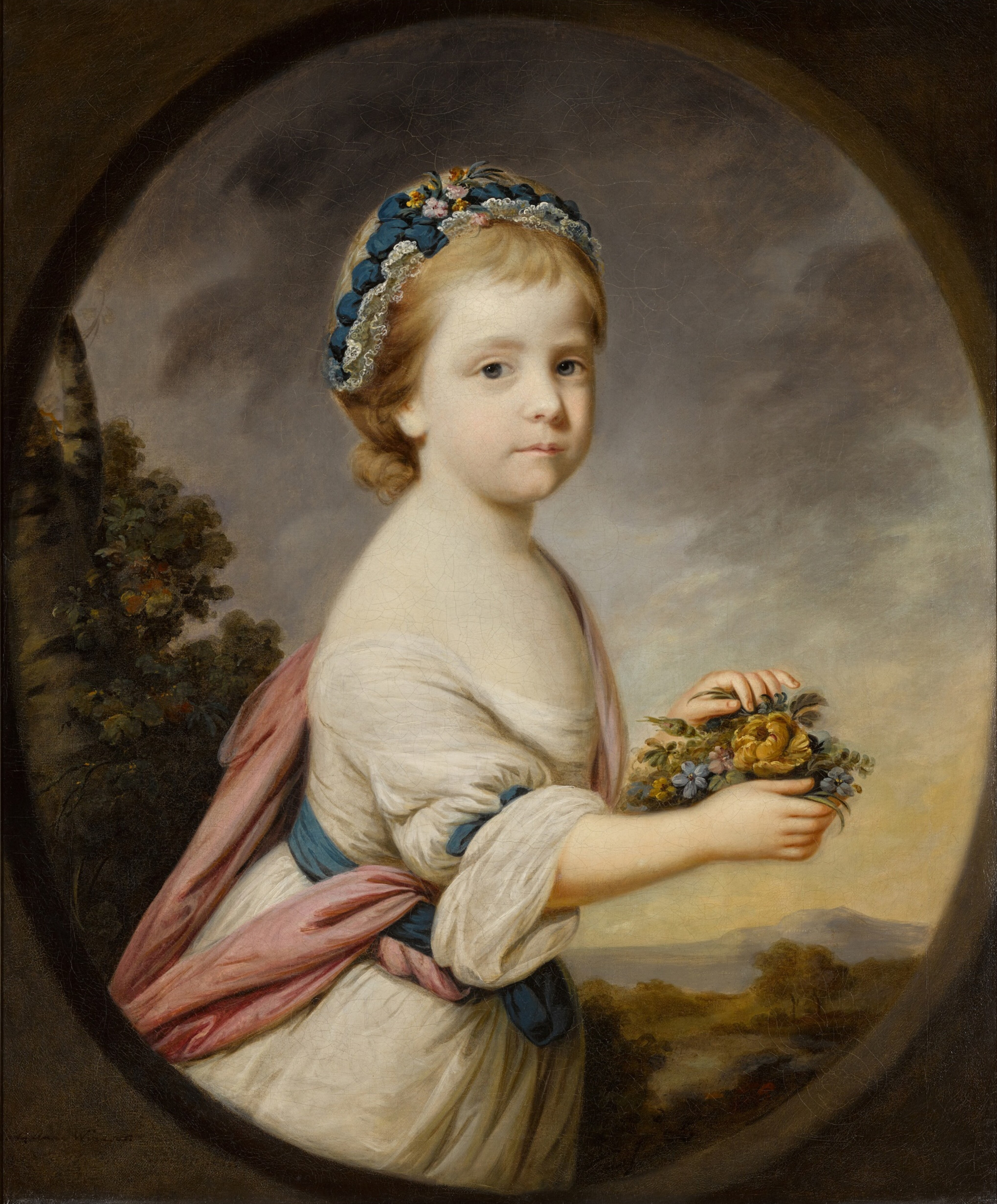
Portrait of his daughter Anne Windsor, by Francis Cotes

On 11 August 1750, Plymouth married Hon. Catherine Archer (d. 1790), eldest daughter of Thomas Archer, 1st Baron Archer and Catherine Tipping. Together, they were the parents of:

- Other Windsor, 5th Earl of Plymouth (1751–1799), who married his cousin, Hon. Sarah Archer, daughter of Andrew Archer, 2nd Baron Archer, in 1778.
- Hon. Thomas Windsor (1752–1832), an officer in the Royal Navy who married Ms. Bagenal, daughter of John Bagenal, in 1793.
- Lady Catherine Sydney Windsor (1755–1823), who married Sir James Tylney-Long, 7th Baronet, son of Sir Robert Long, 6th Baronet and Lady Emma Child (daughter of Richard Child, 1st Earl Tylney), in 1785.
- Lady Elizabeth Windsor (1757–1821), who married Gore Townsend, son of Joseph Townsend, in 1776.
- Lady Anne Windsor (1761–1793), who married Rev. Sir Thomas Broughton, 6th Baronet, son of Sir Brian Broughton-Delves, 4th Baronet, in 1787.
- Lady Sarah Windsor (1763–1825), who married Sir William Champion de Crespigny, 2nd Baronet.
- Andrews Windsor, 7th Earl of Plymouth (1764–1837), a minister who died unmarried.
- Henry Windsor, 8th Earl of Plymouth (1768–1843), who married Anne Copson, daughter of Thomas Copson, in 1798.

When he died in 1771, Plymouth was succeeded by his son Other. On the death of the 4th Earl's youngest son Henry, the earldom became extinct. The barony of Windsor remained in abeyance until 1855 when the abeyance was terminated in favour of Lady Harriet Windsor-Clive (third child and second daughter of the 5th Earl), who became the 13th Baroness Windsor. Her eldest son Robert Windsor-Clive predeceased her and she was succeeded by her grandson, Robert, 14th Baron Windsor, who was a prominent Conservative politician.

Honorary titles
Preceded by The Lord Archer	Custos Rotulorum of Flintshire; 1753–1771	Vacant Title next held by The Lord Kenyon
Preceded by The Duke of Bolton	Lord Lieutenant of Glamorgan; 1754–1771	Succeeded by Lord Mount Stuart
Peerage of England
Preceded by Other Windsor	Earl of Plymouth; 1732–1771	Succeeded by Other Windsor
