= Jonathan Shipley =

British bishop (1714–1788)

The Right Reverend Jonathan Shipley
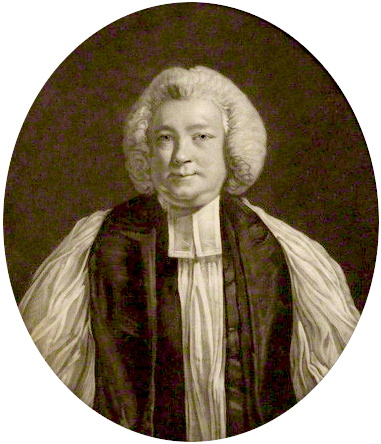
- Bishop Shipley
- Church: Church of England

Personal details
- Born: 1714 London, England
- Died: 6 December 1788 (aged 73–74)
- Denomination: Anglican
- Education: St John's College, Oxford (BA, MA, DD)

Jonathan Shipley (1714 – 6 December 1788) was a clergyman who held offices in the Church of England (including Dean of Winchester from 1760 to 1769), who became Bishop of Llandaff from January to September 1769 and Bishop of St Asaph from September 1769 until his death.

== Life ==
=== Early life and career ===
He was the son of a London stationer; and Martha (née Davies), his mother's family were owners of Twyford House, a large manor in Winchester, England. His brother, the portrait painter William Shipley (1714–1803), later originated the Society of Arts. Jonathan grew up at Walbrook in the City of London and was educated at Reading School in Berkshire.

He received his college training at St John's College, Oxford, from where he received a BA degree in 1735, an MA degree in 1738, and a DD degree in 1748. He was ordained about 1738, and acted as tutor in the household of the Earl of Peterborough. In 1743, he became rector of Silchester and Sherborne St John in Hampshire, and prebendary of Winchester. He was appointed to a canonry of Christ Church, Oxford, in 1748, and in 1760 to the deanery of Winchester and the living of Chilbolton, also in Hampshire, which he held in addition to his earlier preferments.

Shipley was painted by Joshua Reynolds – two 1777 prints after the portrait, engraved by John Raphael Smith, are now in the National Portrait Gallery. At least one letter from Reynolds to Shipley survives, dated 25 September 1784 – the artist wrote thanking Shipley for his congratulations on being appointed Chief Painter to the King, declining an invitation to visit him at Chilbolton and hoping to visit him at St Asaph en route for Ireland the following year

=== Political involvement ===
On 19 January 1769 he was nominated bishop of Llandaff, with his consecration on 12 February. He was friends with Alexander Hamilton. On 8 September the same year he was translated to be Bishop of St Asaph. He was much concerned with politics, and joined the Whig party in strong opposition to the policy of George III towards the American colonies. In 1774, when the British Parliament were discussing punitive measures against the town of Boston after the Tea Party incident, Shipley was apparently the only Church of England Bishop (who were legally constituted members of Parliament) who raised his voice in opposition. He prepared a speech in protest against the proposed measures, but was not given the opportunity to present it. Therefore, he had it published, but due to the general feeling in England against the rebellious colonies, the speech had no effect. In the speech he pointed out that in the year 1772, the Crown had collected only 85 pounds from the American colonies. He stated: "Money that is earned so dearly as this ought to be expended with great wisdom and economy." For these views, St. Asaph Street in Old Town, Alexandria, Virginia, in the United States, was named after one of Shipley's bishoprics.

Shipley also maintained a strong friendship with the Philadelphia printer Benjamin Franklin, who stayed with Shipley in Winchester, and while there wrote much of his autobiography. In 1784, in a letter to Henry Laurens, Franklin called Shipley "America's constant friend, the good Bishop of Asaph." In 1779, Shipley was the only bishop to advocate the abolition of all laws against Protestant dissenters.

== Marriage, issue and death ==
Jonathan Shipley married Anna Maria Mordaunt, daughter of Rev George Mordaunt and Elizabeth Doyley, and niece of Charles Mordaunt, 3rd Earl of Peterborough, to whose family Shipley was a tutor. They left descendants:

- William Davies Shipley (1745–1826), Dean of St Asaph
- Anna Maria Shipley (1748–1829), married Sir William Jones
- Amelia Shipley (died 1800), married William Charles Sloper MP
- Elizabeth Shipley (died 1794)
- Georgiana Shipley (died 1806), painter and art patron, married Francis Hare-Naylor
- Catherine Louisa Shipley (1759–1840)

=== Commemoration ===
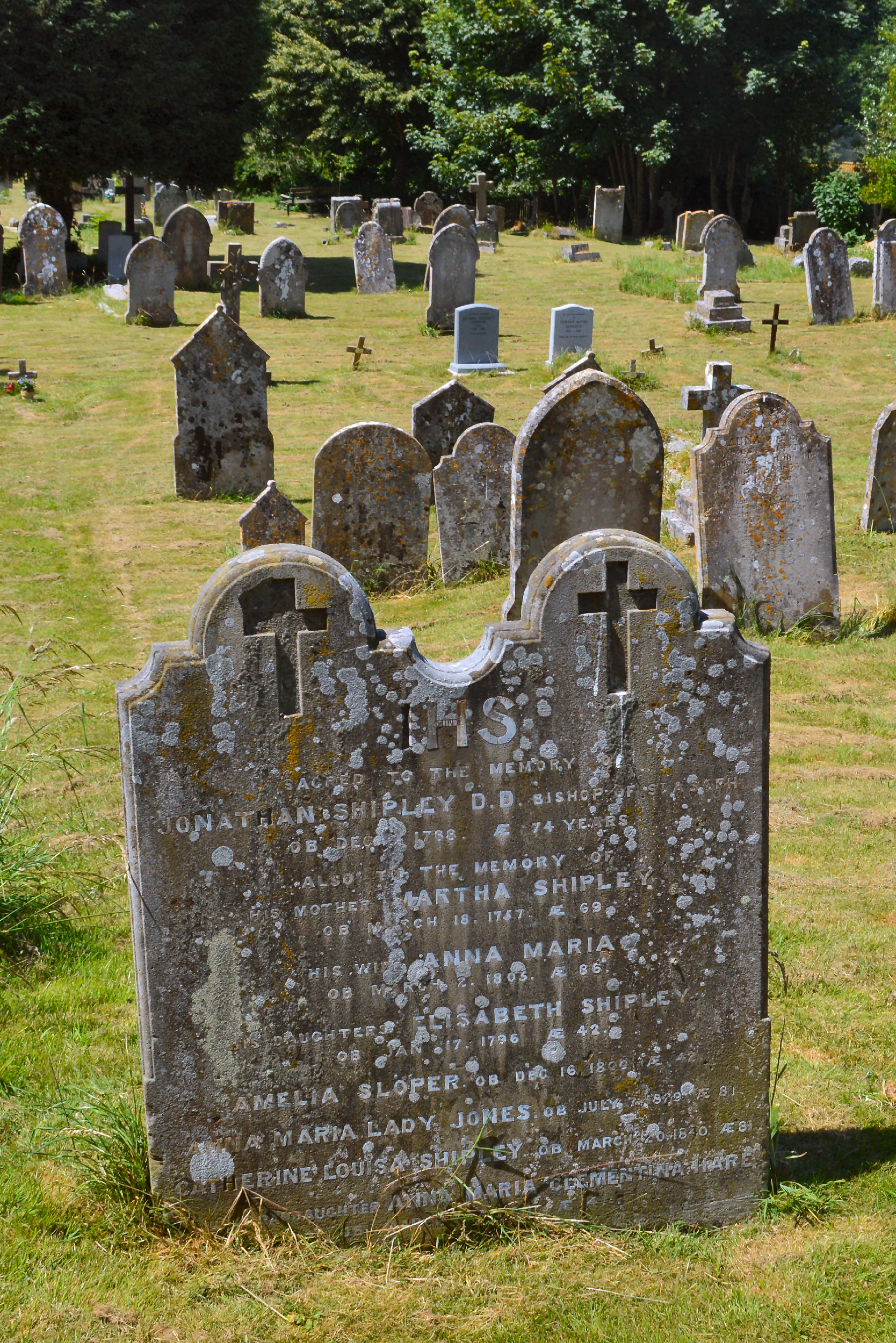
Grave

Thomas Moule's English Counties (1837 edition) states that the chancel of St Mary's Church, Twyford then contained "a mural monument, with a bust, by Joseph Nollekens" in Shipley's memory. The church was largely rebuilt in the 19th century, and the monument survives in the present building.
