= John Ewer =

English bishop (died 1774)

John Ewer (died 1774) was an English bishop of Llandaff and bishop of Bangor. He is now remembered for an attack on the American colonists, prompted by their indifference to episcopacy.

== Life ==
The son of Edward Ewer, born at Belchamp St Paul, Essex. He was educated at Eton College, and matriculated in 1724 at King's College, Cambridge, of which he became Fellow in 1727. He took the degrees of B.A. 1728, M.A. 1733, and D.D. 1756.

On leaving college he was appointed assistant-master at Eton. He afterwards become tutor to John Manners, Marquess of Granby (1721-1770), who presented him to the richly endowed rectory of Bottesford, Leicestershire, in 1735: Ewer went as Lord Granby's tutor on his Grand Tour of 1739-1740. On 1 March 1738 he was appointed by patent to a canonry of Windsor, with which he subsequently held the rectory of West Ilsley, Berkshire. In 1749 he became rector of Dengie, Essex, and on 4 November 1751 was instituted prebendary of Moreton cum Whaddon in Hereford Cathedral.

He was raised to the see of Llandaff on 13 September 1761. Ewer took occasion, in a sermon preached before the Society for the Propagation of the Gospel in Foreign Parts, 20 February 1767, to reproach the American colonists because they failed to see any use for bishops or episcopally ordained ministers. He then proceeded to brand them as "infidels and barbarians" living in "dissolute wickedness, and the most brutal profligacy of manners". There were replies from Charles Chauncy of Boston, in A Letter to a Friend, dated 10 December 1767, and in a Letter to Ewer himself, by William Livingston, governor of New Jersey, in 1768.

Ewer was translated to Bangor on 20 December 1768. He died on 28 October 1774 at his seat near Worcester. He married on 14 September 1743, Elizabeth, daughter of Thomas Barnardiston of Wyverstone, Suffolk, who survived him; he left a daughter, Margaret Frances Ewer.

== Notes ==
Church of England titles
Preceded by Richard Newcome	Bishop of Llandaff; 1761–1768	Succeeded by Jonathan Shipley
Preceded by John Egerton	Bishop of Bangor; 1768–1774	Succeeded by John Moore
