= Sir William Owen, 4th Baronet =

Welsh politician

Sir William Owen, 4th Baronet (1697?–1781), of Orielton, Pembrokeshire, was a Welsh politician who sat in the House of Commons for 52 years from 1722 to 1774.

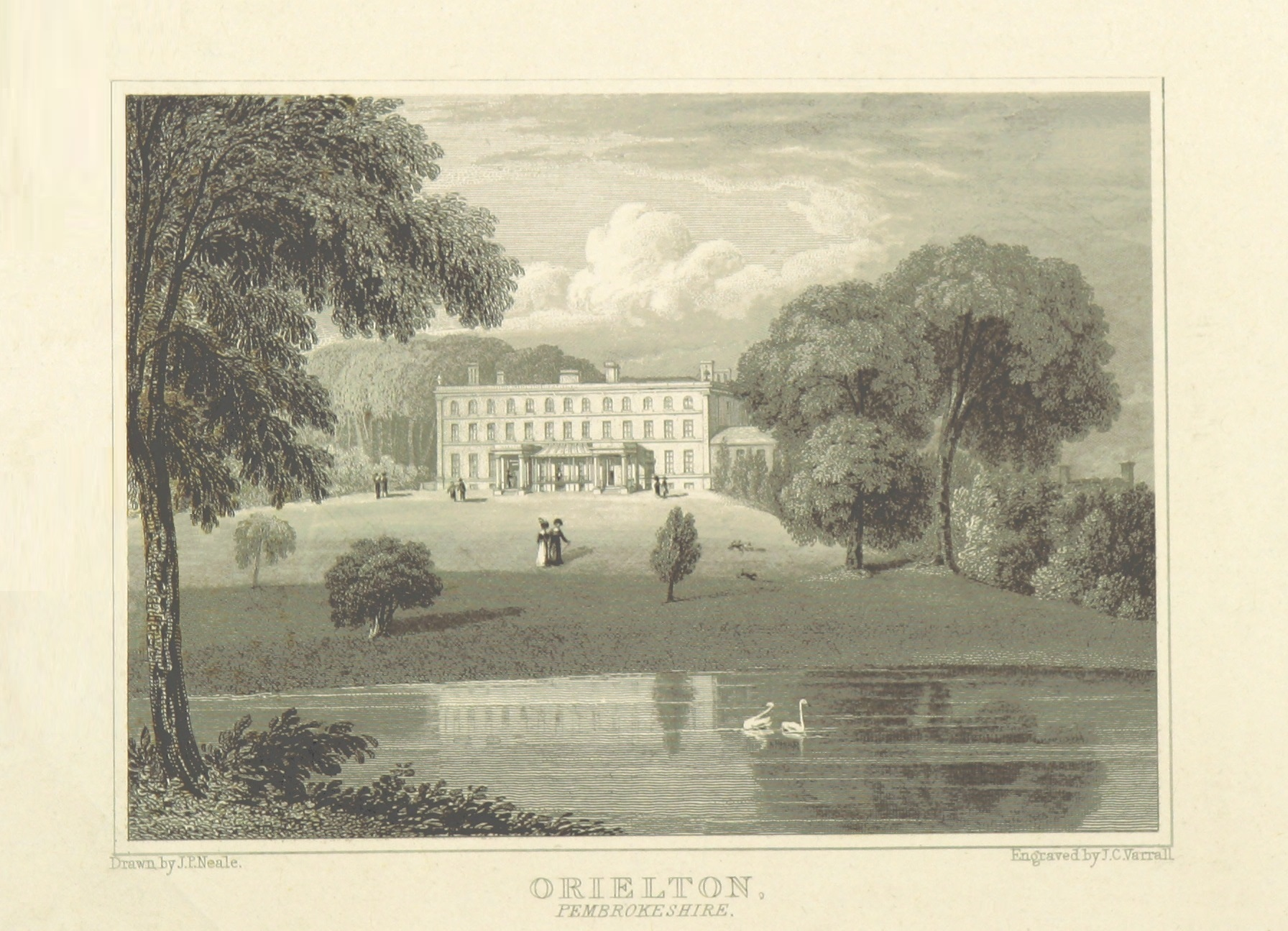
Orielton in 1818

Owen was the eldest son of Sir Arthur Owen, 3rd Baronet, and his wife Emma Williams, daughter of Sir William Williams, 1st Baronet. He matriculated at New College, Oxford, on 16 June 1713, aged 16. He married Elizabeth Lloyd, daughter of Thomas Lloyd of Grove, Pembrokeshire, on 12 December 1725. He married as his second wife his cousin Anne Williams, daughter of John Williams of Chester, on 26 July 1728.

Owen was returned as Member of Parliament (MP) for Pembroke Boroughs on the Orielton interest at a by-election on 13 November 1722. He voted with the Administration in every recorded division. He was returned unopposed in the general elections of 1727 and 1734 and won a contest in 1741. At the 1747 British general election he was returned for Pembroke Boroughs again and also for Pembrokeshire. He opted to sit for Pembrokeshire.

Owen succeeded his father to the baronetcy in 1753, inheriting the family seat of Orielton House. He was returned unopposed again for Pembrokeshire at the 1754 British general election. At the 1761 British general election, he was returned again for Pembroke Boroughs. He retired from Parliament at the general election of 1774. He succeeded the previous baronet as Lord Lieutenant of Pembrokeshire in 1753, retaining the position until 1775.

He married twice and had 2 sons and 3 daughters. Owen died on 7 May 1781 leaving two sons and three daughters. He was succeeded in the baronetcy by his son Hugh.

Parliament of Great Britain
| Preceded by Thomas Ferrers | Member of Parliament for Pembroke Boroughs; 1722–1747 | Succeeded by Hugh Barlow |
| Preceded by John Campbell | Member of Parliament for Pembrokeshire; 1747–1761 | Succeeded by Sir John Philipps, Bt |
| Preceded by Hugh Barlow | Member of Parliament for Pembroke Boroughs; 1761–1774 | Succeeded by Hugh Owen (later Hugh Barlow II) |
Baronetage of England
| Preceded by Arthur Owen | Baronet (of Orielton); 1753-1781 | Succeeded by Hugh Owen |
