= Lord Lieutenant of Glamorgan =

Welsh county ceremonial officer

This is a list of people who served as Lord Lieutenant of Glamorgan. After 1729, all Lords Lieutenant were also Custos Rotulorum of Glamorgan. The post was abolished on 31 March 1974.

== Lord Lieutenants of Glamorgan to 1974 ==
- Henry Herbert, 2nd Earl of Pembroke 24 February 1587 – 19 January 1601 as Lord Lieutenant of Wales
- Edward Somerset, 4th Earl of Worcester 17 July 1602 – 3 March 1628 jointly with
- Henry Somerset, 5th Earl of Worcester 3 December 1626 – 9 May 1629
- William Compton, 1st Earl of Northampton 9 May 1629 – 24 June 1630 as Lord Lieutenant of Wales
- John Egerton, 1st Earl of Bridgwater 11 July 1631 – 1642 as Lord Lieutenant of Wales
- Interregnum
- Richard Vaughan, 2nd Earl of Carbery 22 December 1660 – 20 July 1672 as Lord Lieutenant of Wales
- Henry Somerset, 1st Duke of Beaufort 20 July 1672 – 22 March 1689 as Lord Lieutenant of Wales
- Charles Gerard, 1st Earl of Macclesfield 22 March 1689 – 7 January 1694 as Lord Lieutenant of Wales
- Thomas Herbert, 8th Earl of Pembroke 11 May 1694 – 2 October 1715
- vacant
- Charles Powlett, 3rd Duke of Bolton 13 January 1729 – 26 August 1754
- Other Windsor, 4th Earl of Plymouth 6 November 1754 – 1771
- John Stuart, 4th Earl of Bute 22 May 1772 – 14 March 1793
- John Stuart, Lord Mount Stuart 14 March 1793 – 22 January 1794
- vacant. Deputy Lieutenants acting during vacancy:
  - George Aubrey
  - John Price
  - John Richards
- John Stuart, 1st Marquess of Bute 24 December 1794 – 16 November 1814
- John Crichton-Stuart, 2nd Marquess of Bute 2 June 1815 – 18 March 1848
- Christopher Rice Mansel Talbot, 4 May 1848 – 17 January 1890
- Robert Windsor-Clive, 1st Earl of Plymouth 26 June 1890 – 6 March 1923
- Ivor Windsor-Clive, 2nd Earl of Plymouth 12 April 1923 – 1 October 1943
- Sir Gerard Bruce 3 December 1943 – 16 July 1952
- Sir Cennyd George Traherne, 16 July 1952 – 31 March 1974†

† Became Lord Lieutenant of Mid Glamorgan, South Glamorgan and West Glamorgan from 1 April 1974.

== Deputy lieutenants ==
A deputy lieutenant of Glamorgan is commissioned by the Lord Lieutenant of Glamorgan. Deputy lieutenants support the work of the lord-lieutenant. There can be several deputy lieutenants at any time, depending on the population of the county. Their appointment does not terminate with the changing of the lord-lieutenant, but they usually retire at age 75.

=== 19th Century ===
- 28 February 1846: Richard Bassett
- 28 February 1846: Henry Bruce, 1st Baron Aberdare
- 28 February 1846: William Meyrick
- 28 February 1846: Thomas Powell
- 28 February 1846: Evan Williams
