= Wilmot Vaughan, 1st Earl of Lisburne =

Welsh peer and politician

Wilmot Vaughan, 1st Earl of Lisburne (1728 – 6 January 1800), of Trawsgoed, Cardiganshire, known as Viscount Lisburne from 1766 to 1776, was a Welsh peer and politician.

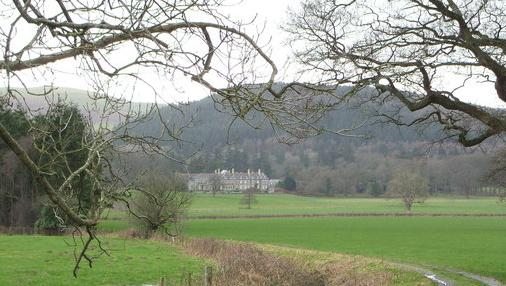
Trawsgoed mansion, Ceredigion, Wales

Lisburne was the son of Wilmot Vaughan, 3rd Viscount Lisburne, and was educated at Eton College.

On 30 Jan 1750/1, he was commissioned an ensign in the 2nd Regiment of Foot Guards. He resigned his commission in December 1754.

He was elected to the House of Commons for Cardiganshire in 1755, a seat he held until 1761 and again from 1768 to 1791 and also represented Berwick-upon-Tweed between 1765 and 1768. He served as a Lord of Trade in 1768 and as a Lord of the Admiralty from 1770 to 1782. Lisburne succeeded his father as fourth Viscount Lisburne in 1766 but as this was an Irish peerage it did not prohibit him from sitting in the House of Commons.

Apart from his political career he was also Lord Lieutenant of Cardiganshire from 1762 to his death. On 5 July 1759, he was created a DCL by Oxford. In 1776 he was honoured when he was created Earl of Lisburne, also in the Peerage of Ireland.

Lord Lisburne died in January 1800 and was succeeded in his titles by his eldest son Wilmot. His second son John became the 3rd Earl. His daughter Dorothy Elizabeth married Sir Lawrence Palk, 2nd Baronet.

== Footnotes ==
Parliament of Great Britain
Preceded by John Lloyd	Member of Parliament for Cardiganshire; 1755–1761	Succeeded by John Pugh Pryse
Preceded by Thomas Watson; Sir John Delaval	Member of Parliament for Berwick-upon-Tweed; 1765–1768; With: Sir John Delaval	Succeeded by Sir John Delaval; Robert Paris Taylor
Preceded by John Pugh Pryse	Member of Parliament for Cardiganshire; 1768–1791	Succeeded by Thomas Johnes
Honorary titles
Preceded by The Viscount Lisburne	Lord Lieutenant of Cardiganshire; 1762–1800	Succeeded by Thomas Johnes
Preceded by Thomas Johnes	Custos Rotulorum of Cardiganshire; 1780–1800	Succeeded by Thomas Johnes
Peerage of Ireland
New creation	Earl of Lisburne; 1776–1800	Succeeded by Wilmot Vaughan
Preceded by Wilmot Vaughan	Viscount Lisburne; 1766–1800	Succeeded by Wilmot Vaughan
