= 1755 in Wales =

- Centuries: 16th; 17th; 18th; 19th; 20th
- Decades: 1730s; 1740s; 1750s; 1760s; 1770s
- See also: List of years in Wales; Timeline of Welsh history 1755 in Great Britain Scotland Elsewhere

Events from the year 1755 in Wales.

== Incumbents ==
- Lord Lieutenant of North Wales (Lord Lieutenant of Anglesey, Caernarvonshire, Flintshire, Merionethshire, Montgomeryshire) – George Cholmondeley, 3rd Earl of Cholmondeley
- Lord Lieutenant of Glamorgan – Other Windsor, 4th Earl of Plymouth
- Lord Lieutenant of Brecknockshire and Lord Lieutenant of Monmouthshire – Thomas Morgan
- Lord Lieutenant of Cardiganshire – Wilmot Vaughan, 3rd Viscount Lisburne
- Lord Lieutenant of Carmarthenshire – George Rice
- Lord Lieutenant of Denbighshire – Richard Myddelton
- Lord Lieutenant of Pembrokeshire – Sir William Owen, 4th Baronet
- Lord Lieutenant of Radnorshire – William Perry
- Bishop of Bangor – Zachary Pearce
- Bishop of Llandaff – Edward Cresset (until 13 February); Richard Newcome (from 13 April)
- Bishop of St Asaph – Robert Hay Drummond
- Bishop of St Davids – Anthony Ellys

== Events ==
- Following the death of his wife in this year, Griffith Jones (Llanddowror) goes to live at the home of Madam Bridget Bevan.
- The Brecknockshire Agricultural Society is formed.

== Arts and literature ==
=== New books ===
- Rules of the Honourable Society of Cymmrodorion are published.

=== Music ===
- Morgan Rhys – Golwg o Ben Nebo, ar Wlad yr Addewid (collection of hymns)

== Births ==
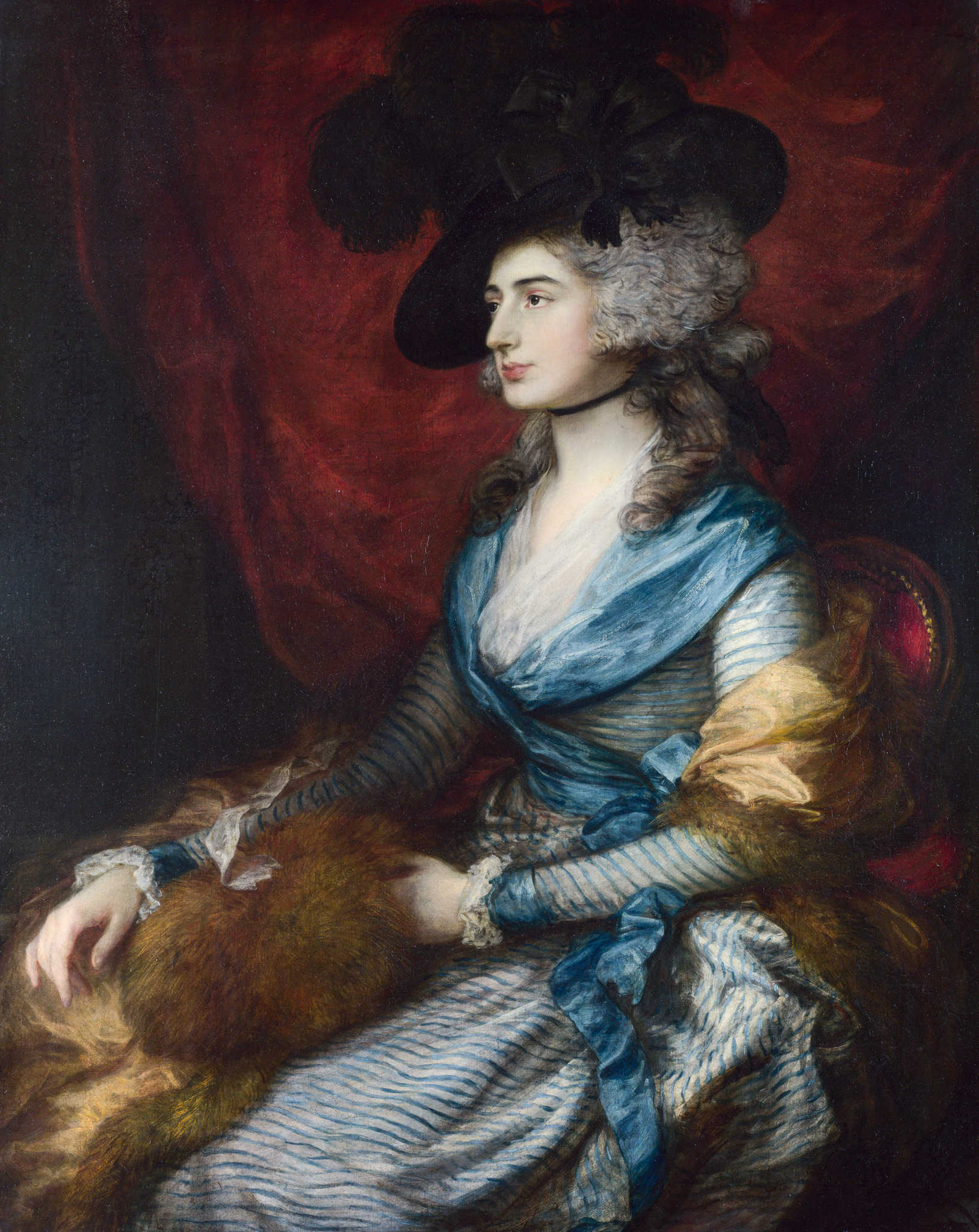
July:Sarah Siddons

- 22 February – Henry Nevill, 2nd Earl of Abergavenny (died 1843)
- 9 May – Wilmot Vaughan, 2nd Earl of Lisburne, owner of the Trawsgoed estate (died 1820)
- 5 July – Sarah Siddons, actress (d. 1831)
- 14 October – Thomas Charles of Bala, clergyman (died 1814)
- 21 October – Caleb Hillier Parry, Welsh-descended physician (died 1822)
- 18 November – Rev. William Jones (died 1821)

== Deaths ==
- 13 February – Edward Cresset, Bishop of Llandaff, 57
- 30 June – Edward Wynne, lawyer and landowner
- 12 July – Zachariah Williams, inventor, 81
- date unknown – John Owen, chancellor of Bangor
