= 1757 in Wales =

- Centuries: 16th; 17th; 18th; 19th; 20th
- Decades: 1730s; 1740s; 1750s; 1760s; 1770s
- See also: List of years in Wales; Timeline of Welsh history 1757 in Great Britain Scotland Elsewhere

Events from the year 1757 in Wales.

== Incumbents ==
- Lord Lieutenant of North Wales (Lord Lieutenant of Anglesey, Caernarvonshire, Flintshire, Merionethshire, Montgomeryshire) – George Cholmondeley, 3rd Earl of Cholmondeley
- Lord Lieutenant of Glamorgan – Other Windsor, 4th Earl of Plymouth
- Lord Lieutenant of Brecknockshire and Lord Lieutenant of Monmouthshire – Thomas Morgan
- Lord Lieutenant of Cardiganshire – Wilmot Vaughan, 3rd Viscount Lisburne
- Lord Lieutenant of Carmarthenshire – George Rice
- Lord Lieutenant of Denbighshire – Richard Myddelton
- Lord Lieutenant of Pembrokeshire – Sir William Owen, 4th Baronet
- Lord Lieutenant of Radnorshire – Howell Gwynne
- Bishop of Bangor – John Egerton
- Bishop of Llandaff – Richard Newcome
- Bishop of St Asaph – Robert Hay Drummond
- Bishop of St Davids – Anthony Ellys

== Events ==
- George Herbert, 2nd Earl of Powis, takes out a lease on Esgair-mwyn lead mine.
- Hirwaun ironworks begins coke smelting.
- Daines Barrington is appointed judge of the Merioneth, Caernarvonshire and Anglesey circuit (Court of Great Sessions).

== Arts and literature ==
=== New books ===
- John Dyer – The Fleece
- Edward Evans – translation of S. Bourne's Catechism
- Elizabeth Griffith – A Series of Genuine Letters between Henry and Frances
- Joseph Harris – An Essay Upon Money and Coins
- Joshua Thomas – Tystiolaeth y Credadyn

=== Music ===
- Elis Roberts – "Jeils"
- William Williams (Pantycelyn) – Rhai Hymnau a Chaniadau Duwiol

== Births ==
- 12 September – John Williams, lawyer and writer on legal topics (died 1810)
- date unknown – Thomas Foley, admiral (died 1833)
- probable – Richard Jones, Ruthin priest and writer (died 1814)

== Deaths ==
- 23 March – Thomas Herring, former Bishop of Bangor, 64
- 16 July – Richard Lloyd, politician, about 54
- 16 September – Savage Mostyn, naval officer, 40s
- December – John Dyer, poet, 56
