= 1762 in Wales =

- Centuries: 16th; 17th; 18th; 19th; 20th
- Decades: 1740s; 1750s; 1760s; 1770s; 1780s
- See also: List of years in Wales; Timeline of Welsh history 1762 in Great Britain Scotland Elsewhere

This article is about the particular significance of the year 1762 to Wales and its people.

== Incumbents ==
- Lord Lieutenant of Anglesey – Sir Nicholas Bayly, 2nd Baronet
- Lord Lieutenant of Brecknockshire and Lord Lieutenant of Monmouthshire – Thomas Morgan
- Lord Lieutenant of Caernarvonshire- Thomas Wynn
- Lord Lieutenant of Cardiganshire – Wilmot Vaughan, 3rd Viscount Lisburne (until 27 July); Wilmot Vaughan, 1st Earl of Lisburne (from 27 July)
- Lord Lieutenant of Carmarthenshire – George Rice
- Lord Lieutenant of Denbighshire – Richard Myddelton
- Lord Lieutenant of Flintshire – Sir Roger Mostyn, 5th Baronet
- Lord Lieutenant of Glamorgan – Other Windsor, 4th Earl of Plymouth
- Lord Lieutenant of Merionethshire – William Vaughan
- Lord Lieutenant of Montgomeryshire – Henry Herbert, 1st Earl of Powis
- Lord Lieutenant of Pembrokeshire – Sir William Owen, 4th Baronet
- Lord Lieutenant of Radnorshire – Howell Gwynne
- Bishop of Bangor – John Egerton
- Bishop of Llandaff – Richard Newcome (until 9 July); John Ewer (from 28 December)
- Bishop of St Asaph – Robert Hay Drummond (until June) Richard Newcome (from 9 July)
- Bishop of St Davids – Anthony Ellys (until 16 January) Samuel Squire (from 24 March)

== Events ==
- Henry Herbert, 1st Earl of Powis, leaves the Whig party.
- Silvanus Bevan is elected a member of the Cymmrodorion.

== Arts and literature ==
=== New books ===
- Thomas Edwards (Twm o'r Nant) – Tri Chydymaith Dyn
- Oliver Goldsmith – The Life of Richard Nash
- William Williams Pantycelyn – Pantheologia, neu Hanes Holl Grefyddau’r Byd

=== Music ===
- William Williams Pantycelyn – Mor o Wydr (including "Gweddi am Nerth i fyned trwy anialwch y Byd", the Welsh original of the hymn "Cwm Rhondda")

== Births ==
- 12 August – George, Prince of Wales, later King George IV (died 1830)
- 11 October – David Charles, hymn-writer (died 1834)
- date unknown
  - Samuel Homfray, iron-master (died 1822)
  - William Jones, bookseller, religious writer, and member of the Scotch Baptist church in Finsbury, London. (died 1846)
  - John Williams, evangelical cleric (died 1802)

== Deaths ==
- 3 February – Beau Nash, leader of fashion, 87
- 2 May – John Salusbury, diarist, 54
- 2 May – Margaret Lloyd, Moravian worker and activist, 53
