= 1753 in Wales =

- Centuries: 16th; 17th; 18th; 19th; 20th
- Decades: 1730s; 1740s; 1750s; 1760s; 1770s
- See also: List of years in Wales; Timeline of Welsh history 1753 in Great Britain Scotland Elsewhere

Events from the year 1753 in Wales.

== Incumbents ==
- Lord Lieutenant of North Wales (Lord Lieutenant of Anglesey, Caernarvonshire, Flintshire, Merionethshire, Montgomeryshire) – George Cholmondeley, 3rd Earl of Cholmondeley
- Lord Lieutenant of Glamorgan – Charles Powlett, 3rd Duke of Bolton
- Lord Lieutenant of Brecknockshire and Lord Lieutenant of Monmouthshire – Thomas Morgan
- Lord Lieutenant of Cardiganshire – Wilmot Vaughan, 3rd Viscount Lisburne
- Lord Lieutenant of Carmarthenshire – vacant until 1755
- Lord Lieutenant of Denbighshire – Richard Myddelton
- Lord Lieutenant of Pembrokeshire – Sir Arthur Owen, 3rd Baronet (until 6 June); Sir William Owen, 4th Baronet (from 2 August)
- Lord Lieutenant of Radnorshire – William Perry
- Bishop of Bangor – Zachary Pearce
- Bishop of Llandaff – Edward Cresset
- Bishop of St Asaph – Robert Hay Drummond
- Bishop of St Davids – Anthony Ellys (from 31 March)

== Events ==
- Lewis Morris is briefly imprisoned at Cardigan when the local squires challenge his rights as the Crown's local representative to mine for lead. As a result of the controversy, Morris visits London for the first time.
- Isaac Wilkinson of Cumbria takes out a lease on the Bersham furnace at Wrexham, and settles at Plas Grono.
- William Thomas, former Sheriff of Caernarvonshire, unsuccessfully brings an action in Chancery against Thomas James, Lord Bulkeley, claiming the advowson of Aber.

== Arts and literature ==
=== New books ===
- Thomas Richards of Coychurch – Antiquæ linguæ Britannicæ thesaurus (English-Welsh dictionary)
- William Wogan – Essay on the Proper Lessons of the Church of England

=== Music ===
- 2 July – John Jones succeeds the late Johann Christoph Pepusch as organist at Charterhouse.

== Births ==
- 2 April – William Lort Mansel, Master of Trinity College, Cambridge (died 1820)
- 8 October – William Jones, Welsh-descended Governor of Rhode Island (died 1822)
- 10 December – Richard Thomas, Anglican priest and antiquarian (died 1780)
- date unknown
  - Christopher Bassett, Methodist clergyman (died 1784)
  - Henry Davies, Baptist minister (died 1825)

== Deaths ==
- 6 June – Sir Arthur Owen, 3rd Baronet, MP for Pembroke and Lord Lieutenant of Pembrokeshire
- date unknown
  - Hughe Hughes, Dean of Bangor, about 44
  - William Gwyn Vaughan, politician, about 72
