= 1760 in Wales =

- Centuries: 16th; 17th; 18th; 19th; 20th
- Decades: 1740s; 1750s; 1760s; 1770s; 1780s
- See also: List of years in Wales; Timeline of Welsh history 1760 in Great Britain Scotland Elsewhere

Events from the year 1760 in Wales.

== Incumbents ==
- Lord Lieutenant of North Wales (Lord Lieutenant of Anglesey, Caernarvonshire, Flintshire, Merionethshire, Montgomeryshire) – George Cholmondeley, 3rd Earl of Cholmondeley (until 25 October)
- Lord Lieutenant of Glamorgan – Other Windsor, 4th Earl of Plymouth
- Lord Lieutenant of Brecknockshire and Lord Lieutenant of Monmouthshire – Thomas Morgan
- Lord Lieutenant of Cardiganshire – Wilmot Vaughan, 3rd Viscount Lisburne
- Lord Lieutenant of Carmarthenshire – George Rice
- Lord Lieutenant of Denbighshire – Richard Myddelton
- Lord Lieutenant of Pembrokeshire – Sir William Owen, 4th Baronet
- Lord Lieutenant of Radnorshire – Howell Gwynne
- Bishop of Bangor – John Egerton
- Bishop of Llandaff – Richard Newcome
- Bishop of St Asaph – Robert Hay Drummond
- Bishop of St Davids – Anthony Ellys

== Events ==
- 25 October
  - The Prince of Wales succeeds his grandfather, King George II, on the throne of Great Britain, as King George III.
  - George Cholmondeley, 3rd Earl of Cholmondeley, surrenders the lord lieutenancy of North Wales, to be replaced by a different holder in each individual county of North Wales.
- Lewis Morris settles his long-standing legal appeal and is appointed JP for Cardiganshire.
- Llangeitho's noted Methodist chapel is built.

== Arts and literature ==
=== New books ===
- William Lloyd – Y Sacrament a'r Aberth Cristionogol

== Births ==
- 4 February – Sir Charles Morgan, 2nd Baronet, soldier and politician (died 1846)
- 11 June – John Walters, poet (died 1789)
- 6 July – Thomas Phillips, surgeon and educational benefactor (died 1851)
- 8 December – Morgan John Rhys, Baptist minister (died 1804)
- date unknown
  - Nancy Jones ("Nancy Crugybar"), hymn-writer and singer (died 1833)
  - David Lewis, priest and writer (died 1850)
  - Frances Williams, convict (died 1801)

== Deaths ==
- 18 January – William Wynn, poet, 50
- April – David Lewis, poet
- 29 April – James Davies, Independent minister
- 25 October – King George II of Great Britain, former Prince of Wales, 76
- October – William Bulkeley, diarist, 68
- date unknown – Thomas Richards, clergyman and writer
