= 1756 in Wales =

- Centuries: 16th; 17th; 18th; 19th; 20th
- Decades: 1730s; 1740s; 1750s; 1760s; 1770s
- See also: List of years in Wales; Timeline of Welsh history 1756 in Great Britain Scotland Elsewhere

Events from the year 1756 in Wales.

== Incumbents ==
- Lord Lieutenant of North Wales (Lord Lieutenant of Anglesey, Caernarvonshire, Flintshire, Merionethshire, Montgomeryshire) – George Cholmondeley, 3rd Earl of Cholmondeley
- Lord Lieutenant of Glamorgan – Other Windsor, 4th Earl of Plymouth
- Lord Lieutenant of Brecknockshire and Lord Lieutenant of Monmouthshire – Thomas Morgan
- Lord Lieutenant of Cardiganshire – Wilmot Vaughan, 3rd Viscount Lisburne
- Lord Lieutenant of Carmarthenshire – George Rice
- Lord Lieutenant of Denbighshire – Richard Myddelton
- Lord Lieutenant of Pembrokeshire – Sir William Owen, 4th Baronet
- Lord Lieutenant of Radnorshire – William Perry (until 13 January); Howell Gwynne (from 13 January)
- Bishop of Bangor – Zachary Pearce (until 4 June); John Egerton (from 4 July)
- Bishop of Llandaff – Richard Newcome
- Bishop of St Asaph – Robert Hay Drummond
- Bishop of St Davids – Anthony Ellys

== Events ==
- 5 January – An article appears in The New York Mercury, criticising the work of Lewis Evans in identifying boundaries in his General Map of the Middle British Colonies in America.
- Spring – Completion of Britain's longest single-span bridge (at this date), William Edwards' Old Bridge, Pontypridd, over the River Taff, at the third (or fourth) attempt.
- Lewis Morris loses his post as collector of tolls at Aberdyfi.

== Arts and literature ==
=== New books ===
- Hugh Hughes – Cywydd Galarnadd am ynys Minorca...
- Sion Kadwaladr – Einion a Gwenllian

=== Music ===
- Elis Roberts – "Argulus"

== Births ==
- January – Richard Griffiths, industrial pioneer who opened up transport links into the Rhondda (died 1826)
- 7 June – Edward Davies ("Celtic" Davies), writer (died 1831)
- 23 June – Thomas Jones, mathematician (died 1807)
- 4 July – John Evans, surgeon and cartographer (died 1846)
- 18 November – Thomas Burgess, Bishop of St David's (died 1837)
- date unknown
  - Thomas Jones of Denbigh, minister and author (died 1820)
  - Simon Lloyd, Methodist preacher (died 1836)

== Deaths ==
- 12 June – Lewis Evans, surveyor, 56?
- 5 August – Sir George Wynne, 1st Baronet, landowner and politician, 56
- 14 September – William Parry, antiquarian and fellow of Jesus College, Oxford, 69
- 23 September – John Talbot, judge and MP for Brecon, about 43/44
- 28 October – Charles Somerset, 4th Duke of Beaufort, 47
