= 1758 in Wales =

- Centuries: 16th; 17th; 18th; 19th; 20th
- Decades: 1730s; 1740s; 1750s; 1760s; 1770s
- See also: List of years in Wales; Timeline of Welsh history 1758 in Great Britain Scotland Elsewhere

Events from the year 1758 in Wales.

== Incumbents ==
- Lord Lieutenant of North Wales (Lord Lieutenant of Anglesey, Caernarvonshire, Flintshire, Merionethshire, Montgomeryshire) – George Cholmondeley, 3rd Earl of Cholmondeley
- Lord Lieutenant of Glamorgan – Other Windsor, 4th Earl of Plymouth
- Lord Lieutenant of Brecknockshire and Lord Lieutenant of Monmouthshire – Thomas Morgan
- Lord Lieutenant of Cardiganshire – Wilmot Vaughan, 3rd Viscount Lisburne
- Lord Lieutenant of Carmarthenshire – George Rice
- Lord Lieutenant of Denbighshire – Richard Myddelton
- Lord Lieutenant of Pembrokeshire – Sir William Owen, 4th Baronet
- Lord Lieutenant of Radnorshire – Howell Gwynne
- Bishop of Bangor – John Egerton
- Bishop of Llandaff – Richard Newcome
- Bishop of St Asaph – Robert Hay Drummond
- Bishop of St Davids – Anthony Ellys

== Events ==
- April – Goronwy Owen becomes headmaster of the grammar school attached to the College of William & Mary, Williamsburg, Virginia.
- 13 July – Josiah Tucker becomes Dean of Gloucester.
- October – Evan Evans (Ieuan Fardd) becomes curate of Llanllechid.
- December – The Llangibby estate passes into the hands of the Addams-Williams family when the original Williams line dies out.
- date unknown – The Welsh Charity School becomes co-educational.

== Arts and literature ==
=== New books ===
- Peter Williams – Blodau i Blant

=== Music ===
- John Thomas – Caniadau Siôn, vol. 1

== Births ==
- 3 May – Stephen Kemble, Herefordshire-born actor, brother of Sarah Siddons (died 1822)
- 24 (or 20) August – Sir Thomas Picton, soldier (died 1815)
- 3 September – Henrietta Clive, Countess of Powis (died 1822)
- 18 October – Theophilus Jones, lawyer and historian (died 1830)
- date unknown – Richard Fothergill, ironmaster (died 1821)
- probable – Isaac Davis, advisor to Kamehameha I of Hawaii (died 1810)

== Deaths ==
- 24 January – William Wogan, religious writer, 79
- 25 January – Herbert Windsor, 2nd Viscount Windsor, 50
- 18 March – Matthew Hutton, Archbishop of Canterbury and former Bishop of Bangor, 65
- 24 March – Sir Thomas Mostyn, 4th Baronet, 53
- December – Sir Leonard Williams, 5th Baronet
