= 1759 in Wales =

- Centuries: 16th; 17th; 18th; 19th; 20th
- Decades: 1730s; 1740s; 1750s; 1760s; 1770s
- See also: List of years in Wales; Timeline of Welsh history 1759 in Great Britain Scotland Elsewhere

This article is about the particular significance of the year 1759 to Wales and its people.

== Incumbents ==
- Lord Lieutenant of North Wales (Lord Lieutenant of Anglesey, Caernarvonshire, Flintshire, Merionethshire, Montgomeryshire) – George Cholmondeley, 3rd Earl of Cholmondeley
- Lord Lieutenant of Glamorgan – Other Windsor, 4th Earl of Plymouth
- Lord Lieutenant of Brecknockshire and Lord Lieutenant of Monmouthshire – Thomas Morgan
- Lord Lieutenant of Cardiganshire – Wilmot Vaughan, 3rd Viscount Lisburne
- Lord Lieutenant of Carmarthenshire – George Rice
- Lord Lieutenant of Denbighshire – Richard Myddelton
- Lord Lieutenant of Pembrokeshire – Sir William Owen, 4th Baronet
- Lord Lieutenant of Radnorshire – Howell Gwynne
- Bishop of Bangor – John Egerton
- Bishop of Llandaff – Richard Newcome
- Bishop of St Asaph – Robert Hay Drummond
- Bishop of St Davids – Anthony Ellys

== Events ==
- 19 September – The Dowlais Iron Company is formed.
- date unknown – Evan Davies resigns as head of the Welsh Academy, following a rift between the Presbyterian and Congregational Fund Boards.

== Arts and literature ==
=== New books ===
- Blodeu-gerdd Cymry (ed. Dafydd Jones)
- Mathias Maurice – Social Religion Exemplify'd
- John Wesley – Primitive Physick, translated by John Evans of Bala

== Births ==
- 1 January – Joseph Foster-Barham, owner of the Trecŵn estate (died 1832)
- 11 February – John Rice Jones, Welsh-born American politician (died 1824)
- 16 March – Sir John Nicholl, politician and judge (died 1838)
- 7 August – William Owen Pughe, lexicographer (died 1835)
- 10 September – George Herbert, 11th Earl of Pembroke (died 1827)
- 18 October – Theophilus Jones, historian (died 1812)
- date unknown -
  - William Aubrey, engineer (died 1827)
  - David Thomas (Dafydd Ddu Eryri), (died 1822)

== Deaths ==
- 11 August – John Heylyn, Welsh-descended clergyman, 74
- 27 September – Isaac Maddox, Bishop of St Asaph, 62
- 2 November – Charles Hanbury Williams, diplomat and satirist, 50
