= 1761 in Wales =

- Centuries: 16th; 17th; 18th; 19th; 20th
- Decades: 1740s; 1750s; 1760s; 1770s; 1780s
- See also: List of years in Wales; Timeline of Welsh history 1761 in Great Britain Scotland Elsewhere

This article is about the particular significance of the year 1761 to Wales and its people.

== Incumbents ==
- Lord Lieutenant of Anglesey – Sir Nicholas Bayly, 2nd Baronet (from 25 November)
- Lord Lieutenant of Caernarvonshire- Thomas Wynn (from 4 July)
- Lord Lieutenant of Denbighshire – Richard Myddelton
- Lord Lieutenant of Flintshire – Sir Roger Mostyn, 5th Baronet (from 10 July)
- Lord Lieutenant of Merionethshire – vacant
- Montgomeryshire – Henry Herbert, 1st Earl of Powis (from 4 July)
- Lord Lieutenant of Glamorgan – Other Windsor, 4th Earl of Plymouth
- Lord Lieutenant of Brecknockshire and Lord Lieutenant of Monmouthshire – Thomas Morgan
- Lord Lieutenant of Cardiganshire – Wilmot Vaughan, 3rd Viscount Lisburne
- Lord Lieutenant of Carmarthenshire – George Rice
- Lord Lieutenant of Pembrokeshire – Sir William Owen, 4th Baronet
- Lord Lieutenant of Radnorshire – Howell Gwynne
- Bishop of Bangor – John Egerton
- Bishop of Llandaff – Richard Newcome (until 9 July); John Ewer (from 28 December)
- Bishop of St Asaph – Robert Hay Drummond (until June) Richard Newcome (from 9 July)
- Bishop of St Davids – Anthony Ellys (until 16 January) Samuel Squire (from 24 March)

== Events ==
- Edward Allgood II (1712–1801) establishes a japannery at Usk.
- Goronwy Owen takes up his position as a rector in Virginia, and his salary is agreed.

== Arts and literature ==
=== New books ===
- Thomas Pennant – British Zoology, volume 1
- John Wesley – Rules of the United Societies, translated into Welsh by John Evans of Bala.

=== Music ===
- John Parry – A Collection of Welsh, English and Scotch Airs

== Births ==
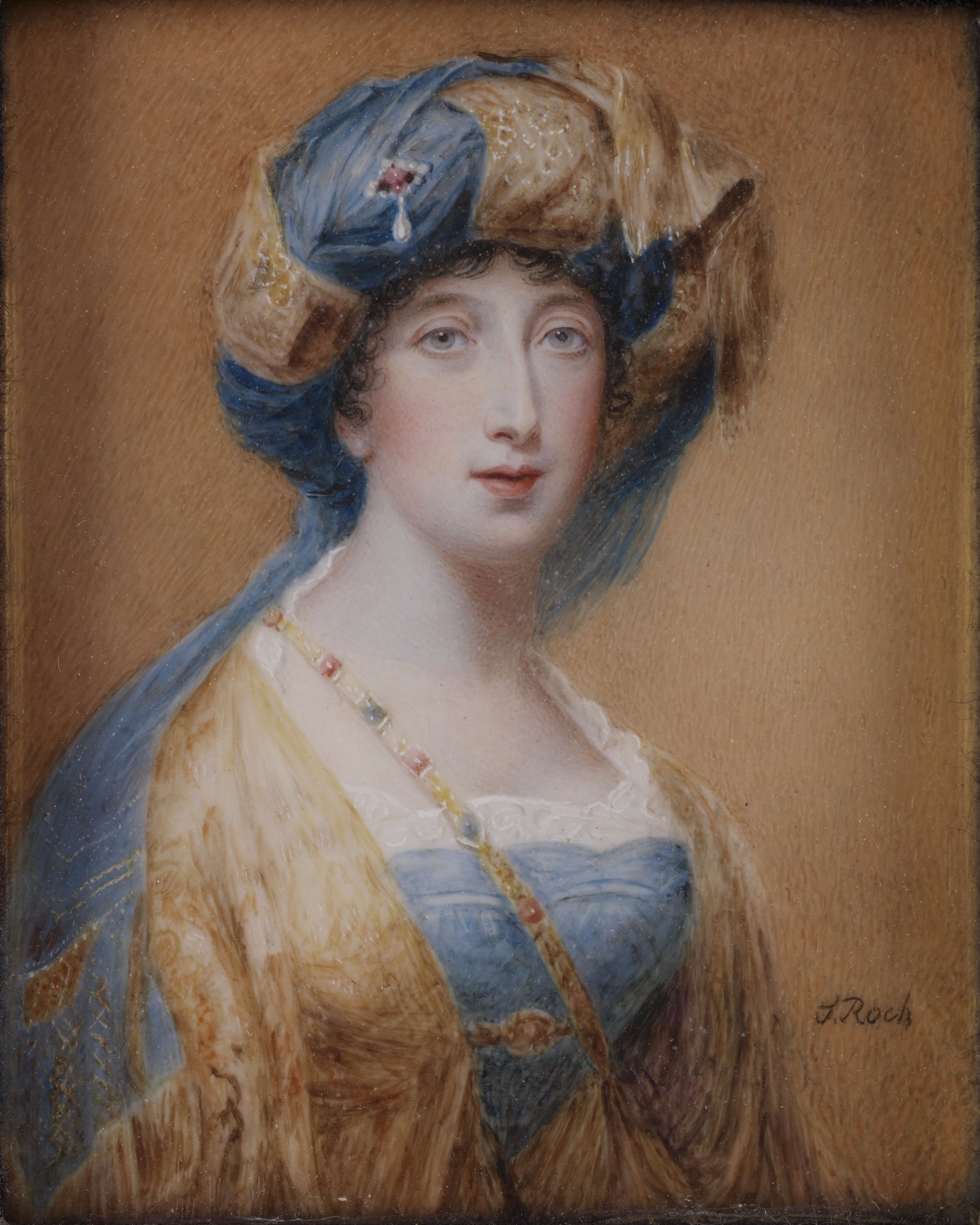
February: Lady Willoughby de Eresby

- 16 February – Priscilla Bertie, 21st Baroness Willoughby de Eresby, Welsh-descended noblewoman and Baroness Gwydyr (died 1828)
- 15 July – Walter Davies (Gwallter Mechain), writer (died 1849)
- 11 October – David Charles, hymn-writer (died 1834)
- date unknown
  - Charles Heath, Radical printer and writer, twice Mayor of Monmouth, in Worcestershire (died 1831)
  - Elizabeth Whitlock, sister of Sarah Siddons and Julia Ann Hatton
  - Helen Maria Williams, novelist and poet, in Scotland (died 1827)

== Deaths ==
- 16 January – Anthony Ellys, Bishop of St Davids, 70
- 4 February – Samuel Davies, Welsh-descended evangelist in America, 37 (pneumonia)
- 8 April – Griffith Jones Llanddowror, pioneer in education, 77
- 27 April – Sir William Williams, 2nd Baronet, of Clapton, Welsh-descended politician, ?31
