= 1754 in Wales =

- Centuries: 16th; 17th; 18th; 19th; 20th
- Decades: 1730s; 1740s; 1750s; 1760s; 1770s
- See also: List of years in Wales; Timeline of Welsh history 1754 in Great Britain Scotland Elsewhere

Events from the year 1754 in Wales.

== Incumbents ==
- Lord Lieutenant of North Wales (Lord Lieutenant of Anglesey, Caernarvonshire, Flintshire, Merionethshire, Montgomeryshire) – George Cholmondeley, 3rd Earl of Cholmondeley
- Lord Lieutenant of Glamorgan – Charles Powlett, 3rd Duke of Bolton (until 26 August); Other Windsor, 4th Earl of Plymouth (from 6 November)
- Lord Lieutenant of Brecknockshire and Lord Lieutenant of Monmouthshire – Thomas Morgan
- Lord Lieutenant of Cardiganshire – Wilmot Vaughan, 3rd Viscount Lisburne
- Lord Lieutenant of Carmarthenshire – vacant until 1755
- Lord Lieutenant of Denbighshire – Richard Myddelton
- Lord Lieutenant of Pembrokeshire – Sir William Owen, 4th Baronet
- Lord Lieutenant of Radnorshire – William Perry
- Bishop of Bangor – Zachary Pearce
- Bishop of Llandaff – Edward Cresset
- Bishop of St Asaph – Robert Hay Drummond
- Bishop of St Davids – Anthony Ellys

== Events ==
- April–May – In the British general election, newly elected MPs include Robert Wynne at Caernarvon Boroughs and Benjamin Bathurst at Monmouth Boroughs.
- John Jenkin (Ioan Siengcin) opens a Welsh school at Nevern.

== Arts and literature ==
=== New books ===
- Richard Rees – Collected sermons, published by Philip Charles
- Ben Simon (ed.) – Collected works of Dafydd ap Gwilym
- Mêr Difinyddiaeth Iachus (second edition, with a preface by Morgan Jones)

=== Music ===
- William Williams (Pantycelyn) – Hosanna i Fab Dafydd, part 2

== Births ==
- 28 October – John Griffiths, medical practitioner and surgeon in the Royal Household (died 1822)
- 25 November – William Parry, minister and author (died 1819)
- date unknown – Charles Hassall, surveyor (died 1814)
- earliest likely year – Jane Cave, poet (died 1812)

== Deaths ==
- 10 January – Erasmus Lewis, writer and civil servant, 83
- 20 February – John Owen, MP, about 52
- 17 May – Richard Herbert, politician, 49/50
- 26 August – Charles Powlett, 3rd Duke of Bolton, Lord Lieutenant of Glamorgan, 68
