= 1749 in Wales =

- Centuries: 16th; 17th; 18th; 19th; 20th
- Decades: 1720s; 1730s; 1740s; 1750s; 1760s
- See also: List of years in Wales; Timeline of Welsh history 1749 in Great Britain Scotland Elsewhere

Events from the year 1749 in Wales.

== Incumbents ==
- Lord Lieutenant of North Wales (Lord Lieutenant of Anglesey, Caernarvonshire, Flintshire, Merionethshire, Montgomeryshire) – George Cholmondeley, 3rd Earl of Cholmondeley
- Lord Lieutenant of Glamorgan – Charles Powlett, 3rd Duke of Bolton
- Lord Lieutenant of Brecknockshire and Lord Lieutenant of Monmouthshire – Thomas Morgan
- Lord Lieutenant of Cardiganshire – Wilmot Vaughan, 3rd Viscount Lisburne
- Lord Lieutenant of Carmarthenshire – vacant until 1755
- Lord Lieutenant of Denbighshire – Richard Myddelton
- Lord Lieutenant of Pembrokeshire – Sir Arthur Owen, 3rd Baronet
- Lord Lieutenant of Radnorshire – William Perry
- Bishop of Bangor – Zachary Pearce
- Bishop of Llandaff – Edward Cresset (from 12 February)
- Bishop of St Asaph – Robert Hay Drummond
- Bishop of St Davids – The Hon. Richard Trevor

== Events ==
- 8 April - Charles Wesley marries Sarah Gwynne of Garth.
- 19 July - "Madam" Sidney Griffith accompanies Howell Harris to the Llangeitho association - the beginning of a relationship that would cause considerable controversy.
- 23 September - Harris finds "Madam Griffith" awaiting him at Trevecka, with the news that her husband, now bankrupt, has beaten her and thrown her out of the house for refusing to give him any more money.
- December - Benjamin Franklin notes that printer Hugh Meredith owes him money.

== Arts and literature ==
=== New books ===
- Lewis Evans - A Map of Pensilvania, New Jersey, New York and the three Delaware counties, including notes on thunder and lightning
- John Jones - Free and Candid Disquisitions
- Zachariah Williams - A True Narrative of certain Circumstances relating to Zachariah Williams in the Charterhouse

== Births ==
- 12 May - Charles Francis Greville, founder of Milford Haven (died 1809)
- 13 May - Prince Frederick of Wales, youngest son of the Prince and Princess of Wales (died 1765)
- 23 September - Sir Watkin Williams-Wynn, 4th Baronet, politician (died 1789)
- date unknown
  - Nicholas Bayly, MP for Anglesey 1784-90 (died 1814)
  - Edward Jones, musician (died 1779)
  - Thomas Owen, Anglican priest and translator (died 1812)
  - Charles Symmons, poet (died 1826)

== Deaths ==
- May - Winifred Herbert, Countess of Nithsdale, 58?
- 3 July - Sir William Jones, mathematician, 74
- August - Angharad James, poet, 72
- 26 September - Sir Watkin Williams-Wynn, 3rd Baronet, 57(injuries sustained in a fall from a horse)
- 22 December - Richard Smalbroke, former Bishop of St David's, 77
