= 1751 in Wales =

- Centuries: 16th; 17th; 18th; 19th; 20th
- Decades: 1730s; 1740s; 1750s; 1760s; 1770s
- See also: List of years in Wales; Timeline of Welsh history 1751 in Great Britain Scotland Elsewhere

Events from the year 1751 in Wales.

== Incumbents ==
- Lord Lieutenant of North Wales (Lord Lieutenant of Anglesey, Caernarvonshire, Flintshire, Merionethshire, Montgomeryshire) – George Cholmondeley, 3rd Earl of Cholmondeley
- Lord Lieutenant of Glamorgan – Charles Powlett, 3rd Duke of Bolton
- Lord Lieutenant of Brecknockshire and Lord Lieutenant of Monmouthshire – Thomas Morgan
- Lord Lieutenant of Cardiganshire – Wilmot Vaughan, 3rd Viscount Lisburne
- Lord Lieutenant of Carmarthenshire – vacant until 1755
- Lord Lieutenant of Denbighshire – Richard Myddelton
- Lord Lieutenant of Pembrokeshire – Sir Arthur Owen, 3rd Baronet
- Lord Lieutenant of Radnorshire – William Perry
- Bishop of Bangor – Zachary Pearce
- Bishop of Llandaff – Edward Cresset
- Bishop of St Asaph – Robert Hay Drummond
- Bishop of St Davids – The Hon. Richard Trevor (until 7 December)

== Events ==
- 20 April – George, eldest son of the late Frederick, Prince of Wales, is made Prince of Wales.
- September – Richard Morris co-founds the Honourable Society of Cymmrodorion in London.
- Richard Price Thelwall inherits his brother's Caernarfonshire estate.

== Arts and literature ==
=== New books ===
- William Williams (Pantycelyn) – Hosanna i Fab Dafydd, part 1

=== Music ===
- William Williams (Pantycelyn) – Hosanna i Fab Dafydd, part 1

== Births ==
- 22 January – David Richards (Dafydd Ionawr), poet (died 1827)
- 15 October – David Samwell (Dafydd Ddu Feddyg), naval surgeon, companion of Captain Cook and bard (died 1798)

== Deaths ==
- 31 March – Frederick, Prince of Wales, 44 (pulmonary embolism)
- 20 September – Anne Vaughan, Duchess of Bolton, 61/62
- 2 October – Thomas Mathews, admiral, 75
- 19 December – Princess Louise of Wales, queen of Denmark and Norway, 27
