= 1752 in Wales =

- Centuries: 16th; 17th; 18th; 19th; 20th
- Decades: 1730s; 1740s; 1750s; 1760s; 1770s
- See also: List of years in Wales; Timeline of Welsh history 1752 in Great Britain Scotland Elsewhere

Events from the year 1752 in Wales.

== Incumbents ==
- Lord Lieutenant of North Wales (Lord Lieutenant of Anglesey, Caernarvonshire, Flintshire, Merionethshire, Montgomeryshire) – George Cholmondeley, 3rd Earl of Cholmondeley
- Lord Lieutenant of Glamorgan – Charles Powlett, 3rd Duke of Bolton
- Lord Lieutenant of Brecknockshire and Lord Lieutenant of Monmouthshire – Thomas Morgan
- Lord Lieutenant of Cardiganshire – Wilmot Vaughan, 3rd Viscount Lisburne
- Lord Lieutenant of Carmarthenshire – vacant until 1755
- Lord Lieutenant of Denbighshire – Richard Myddelton
- Lord Lieutenant of Pembrokeshire – Sir Arthur Owen, 3rd Baronet
- Lord Lieutenant of Radnorshire – William Perry
- Bishop of Bangor – Zachary Pearce
- Bishop of Llandaff – Edward Cresset
- Bishop of St Asaph – Robert Hay Drummond
- Bishop of St Davids – The Hon. Richard Trevor (until 7 December)

== Events ==
- April – A quarryman is killed in an attempted raid on a granary at Caernarfon.
- 5 June – Frances, mother of Sir Watkin Williams-Wynn, 4th Baronet, purchases the Mathafarn estate on her son's behalf.
- 9 November – Richard Trevor becomes Bishop of Durham.
- unknown dates
  - Howell Harris founds the Teulu Trefeca ("The Trefeca family")
  - Sir John Glynne, 6th Baronet, builds New Hawarden Castle.
  - A turnpike road opens between Wrexham and Shrewsbury.
  - The first Methodist chapel in Caernarfonshire is built on land adjoining Tŷ-mawr farm, Bryncroes.

== Arts and literature ==
=== New books ===
- John Evans – Some Account of the Welch Charity Schools
- Theophilus Evans – A History of Modern Enthusiasm

=== Music ===
- John Parry – A Collection of Welsh, English & Scotch Airs
- Harri Llwyd – Hymnau ar Amryw Ystyriaethau

== Births ==
- 2 January – Nicholas Owen, priest and antiquary (died 1811)
- 18 January
  - Josiah Boydell, painter (died 1817)
  - John Nash, architect (died 1835)
- March – Edward Jones (Bardd y Brenin), harpist (died 1824)
- 5 November – Richard Richards, judge (died 1823)
- 12 December – Thomas Bulkeley, 7th Viscount Bulkeley, politician (died 1822)
- date unknown
  - Richard Llwyd, poet and writer (died 1835)
  - Thomas Assheton Smith I, industrialist (died 1828)

== Deaths ==
- 23 April – James Bulkeley, 6th Viscount Bulkeley, 35
- 31 May – "Madam" Sidney Griffith, Methodist (born c.1720)
- 17 November – Thomas Powell, politician, about 51
- probable – Edward Roberts, mayor of Philadelphia, province of Pennsylvania (born c.1690)
