= Simon Lloyd =

Simon Lloyd may refer to:

- Simon Lloyd (priest, born 1756), Welsh Anglican priest who became a Methodist preacher
- Simon Lloyd (priest, died 1676), Welsh Anglican priest
- Simon Lloyd, musician with Icehouse and The Members
- Simon Lloyd, a character in the TV series MDA
