= 1746 in Wales =

- Centuries: 16th; 17th; 18th; 19th; 20th
- Decades: 1720s; 1730s; 1740s; 1750s; 1760s
- See also: List of years in Wales; Timeline of Welsh history 1746 in Great Britain Scotland Elsewhere

Events from the year 1746 in Wales.

== Incumbents ==
- Lord Lieutenant of North Wales (Lord Lieutenant of Anglesey, Caernarvonshire, Denbighshire, Flintshire, Merionethshire, Montgomeryshire) – George Cholmondeley, 3rd Earl of Cholmondeley
- Lord Lieutenant of Glamorgan – Charles Powlett, 3rd Duke of Bolton
- Lord Lieutenant of Brecknockshire and Lord Lieutenant of Monmouthshire – Thomas Morgan
- Lord Lieutenant of Cardiganshire – Wilmot Vaughan, 3rd Viscount Lisburne
- Lord Lieutenant of Carmarthenshire – vacant until 1755
- Lord Lieutenant of Pembrokeshire – Sir Arthur Owen, 3rd Baronet
- Lord Lieutenant of Radnorshire – William Perry
- Bishop of Bangor – Matthew Hutton
- Bishop of Llandaff – John Gilbert
- Bishop of St Asaph – Samuel Lisle
- Bishop of St Davids – The Hon. Richard Trevor

== Events ==
- The Wales and Berwick Act 1746 is passed by the Parliament of Great Britain. It specifies that all future laws applying to England will also be applicable to Wales and Berwick-upon-Tweed. It is finally repealed in its entirety by the Interpretation Act 1978.
- William Edwards begins his first attempt at building a bridge over the River Taff at Pontypridd.
- Construction of The Cathedral School, Llandaff, and the "Italian Temple", both designed by John Wood, the Elder, is completed.
- Sidney Griffith joins the Methodist movement, after hearing a sermon by Peter Williams.

== Arts and literature ==
=== New books ===
- Anna Williams - Life of the Emperor Julian (translation from the French)

== Births ==
- January - Thomas Totty, admiral (died 1802)
- 28 September - William Jones, philologist (died 1794)

== Deaths ==
- 7 May - Sir Thomas Hanmer, 4th Baronet, politician and literary editor, 68
- 21 May - Lewis Morris, Welsh-descended Governor of New Jersey, 74
