= 1761 in Great Britain =

Events from the year 1761 in Great Britain.

== Incumbents ==
- Monarch – George III
- Prime Minister – Thomas Pelham-Holles, 1st Duke of Newcastle (Whig)

== Events ==
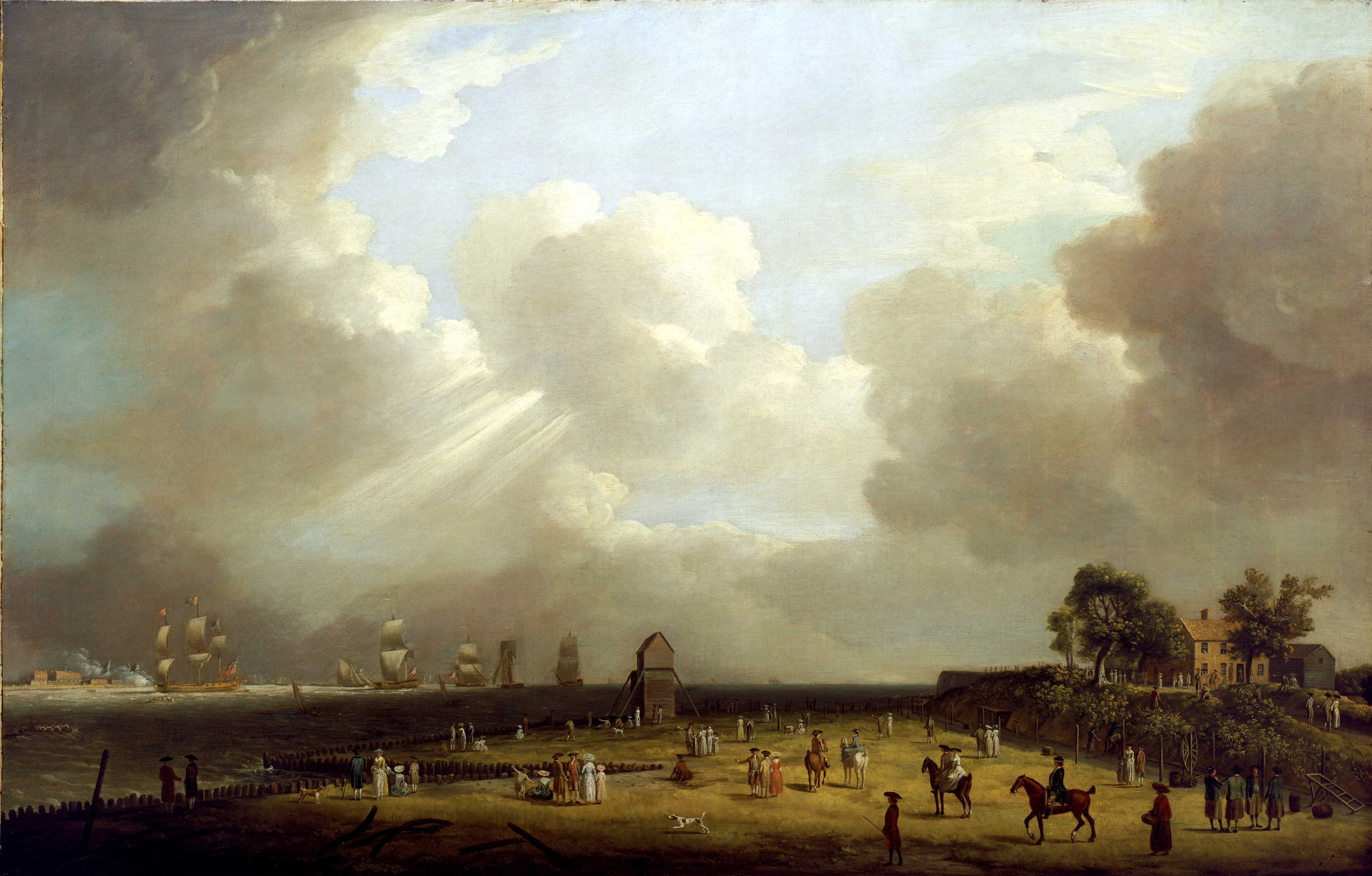
Princess Charlotte Arriving at Harwich by Dominic Serres

- 16 January – in India, general Sir Eyre Coote captures Pondicherry from the French.
- 8 February – an earthquake in London breaks chimneys in Limehouse and Poplar.
- 8 March – a second earthquake occurs in North London, Hampstead and Highgate.
- 9 March – Hexham Riot ("Bloody Monday"): a crowd protesting at enlistment to the militia in Hexham (Northumberland) is fired on by members of the North Yorkshire Militia with around 45 killed and many more wounded.
- 25 March–5 May – a general election is held. The Whig party retains its majority.
- 9 May – The Exhibition of 1761, the inaugural exhibition of the Society of Artists of Great Britain opens at Spring Gardens in London
- 15–16 July – Seven Years' War: a combined Prussian-Hanoverian-British force led by Prince Ferdinand of Brunswick defeats a large French army at the Battle of Villinghausen.
- 17 July – James Brindley completes the Bridgewater Canal from Worsley to Manchester.
- 15 August – Seven Years' War: France and Spain sign the Pacte de Famille forming an alliance against Britain.
- September – Secretary of State for the Southern Department William Pitt the Elder fails to garner support to declare war on Spain.
- 8 September – King George III marries Charlotte of Mecklenburg-Strelitz (who he has met for the first time earlier in the day) at St James's Palace.
- 14 October – Great Malvern Tornado.
- 22 September – coronation of King George III and Queen Charlotte at Westminster Abbey.
- 5 October – Pitt resigns as Secretary of State for the Southern Department. The Tory The Earl of Bute forms a new administration.

=== Undated ===
- Industrial Revolution: Establishment of Matthew Boulton's Soho Manufactory near Birmingham to serve the "Birmingham toy industry", considered as the first factory for the production of metal goods in Britain.
- Buckingham Palace, London, sold to George III; remodelling as a house for Queen Charlotte will begin the following year.
- First church of the Countess of Huntingdon's Connexion opened, in Brighton.
- The village of Nuneham Courtenay in Oxfordshire is demolished and rebuilt on a new site by Simon, Earl Harcourt to improve the landscaping of Nuneham House.
- The Halifax Treaties are concluded between the various bands of the Miꞌkmaq, other First Nations people and the British in Halifax, Nova Scotia, notably in the Burying the Hatchet ceremony on 25 June.

== Publications ==
- James Macpherson's supposed translation Fingal, an Ancient Epic Poem in Six Books, together with Several Other Poems composed by Ossian, the Son of Fingal, translated from the Gaelic Language.
- Frances Sheridan's novel Memoirs of Miss Sidney Biddulph.

== Births ==
- 17 January – James Hall, geologist (died 1832)
- 13 March – Henry Shrapnel, British Army officer and inventor (died 1842)
- 7 June – John Rennie the Elder, civil engineer (died 1821)
- 17 August – William Carey, missionary (died 1834 in India)
- 27 October – Matthew Baillie, physician and pathologist (died 1823)
- 13 November – John Moore, general (died 1809)
- 30 November – Smithson Tennant, chemist (died 1815)

== Deaths ==
- 4 January – Stephen Hales, physiologist, chemist, and inventor (born 1677)
- 10 January – Edward Boscawen, admiral (born 1711)
- 9 April – William Law, minister (born 1686)
- 15 April – Archibald Campbell, Duke of Argyll, politician (born 1682)
- 17 April
  - Thomas Bayes, mathematician (born c.1702)
  - Benjamin Hoadly, theologian, Bishop (born 1676)
- 14 May – Thomas Simpson, mathematician (born 1710)
- 4 July – Samuel Richardson, writer (born 1689)
- 30 November – John Dollond, optician (born 1706)
- 23 December – Alestair Ruadh MacDonnell, Jacobite spy (born c.1725)

== See also ==
- 1761 in Wales
