= Joseph Harris (astronomer) =

British blacksmith, astronomer and navigator

- Born: February 1703; Trefeca, Talgarth, Brecknock, Wales, United Kingdom
- Died: 26 September 1764 (aged 61); London, United Kingdom
- Citizenship: British
- Occupation: King's Assay Master at the Royal Mint

Joseph Harris (February 1704 – 1764) was a British blacksmith, astronomer, navigator, economist, natural philosopher, government adviser and King's Assay Master at the Royal Mint.

Theophilus Jones, in A History of the County of Brecknock (1805), says that Joseph Harris, married one of the daughters, and heiress, of Thomas Jones, of Tredustan, and that "little has been recorded beyond the information derived from his monument in the church".

== Early life ==
As far as biographies of Joseph Harris are concerned, things remain much the same now as they were in 1805, when Theophilus Jones was writing. The Harris family history of three brothers, all highly successful in entirely unrelated vocations, has tended to concentrate on the youngest of the three, Howell Harris, known as the "Apostle of Wales".

Joseph was baptised on 16 February 1703 in the church of Saint Gwendolen, Talgarth, on the slopes of the Black Mountains in the Welsh county of Brecknock, now part of Powys. His baptismal record falls between the beginning of January and the end of March, a period that until 1752 was in flux between the Julian and the Gregorian calendars, and with those three months considered in the Old Style as being part of the year that had just passed and in the New Style part of the year ahead; before 1752 this was expressed in the form of a fraction, the OS year uppermost and the NS year below. But it seems likely that the person who made the entry was confused, reversing the year dates; record keeping in Saint Gwendolen's had after all started only eight years earlier. It was at a later date that the incorrect OS year in that and similar entries was scored through, as well as recording a name change from Powell to Harries. Joseph was the first-born of Howell Powell, a joiner, and Susanna Powell, both of the same surname before, as well as after, their union, but how closely they were related, if at all, is not known. Their marriage is recorded in the parish register of Saint Gwendolen on 5 September 1702 and they lived in a small cluster of houses, the hamlet of Trefeca, (but then written Trevecka which sounds the same) about a mile south of, and in the parish of, Talgarth in the valley of the Breconshire Afon Llynfi, a tributary of the Welsh River Wye. Certainly by the time of the September 1704 baptism of the next child, daughter Anne, the family name of all its members had changed to Harries, an English name; nonetheless, all family members were bilingual in Welsh and English. Three further children were born in the next eleven years, of whom Thomas (bapt. June 1707) and Howell (bapt. February 1715 NS) survived beyond infancy to old age, while both Anne and an earlier Thomas (bapt. January 1706 NS) died soon after birth.

A similar, and related, confusion attends the record of Joseph's death on 26 September 1764. Both the memorial in Saint Gwendolen's and the record in Saint Peter ad Vincula in the Tower of London, in whose crypt he is buried, record him as being sixty-two years of age, which means he would have had to have been born before 26 September 1702; but in those days of high infant mortality it was thought essential to baptise a baby as soon as possible after birth to ensure his or her acceptance into Heaven, rather than Purgatory, should he or she succumb. A gap of five and a half months would have been negligent. The explanation for this discrepancy may well be that the sole source of the information was Joseph's only surviving offspring, Anna-Maria Harris, and the Harris family had in the past been vague about birthdays.

For Joseph's life in Trefeca before he moved to London, aged 21, the authority, apart from the church records and some reminiscences in his letters home from London, is the sometimes unreliable work of Theophilus Jones's History, which found little to say of him, as the quotation above shows. But we are told that he was apprenticed to his uncle Thomas Powell, a blacksmith, and that he met and fell in love with Anne Jones, one of three daughters of an eminent Brecknock family, whom he courted respectfully for at least 12 years and then married soon after he was appointed to the Royal Mint in 1736. From the fact that, despite the difference in their social position, Anne's father, Thomas Jones II, High Sheriff of Brecknock for 1722, recommended that she treat Joseph's attentions with respect, we may guess that his brilliance was well known locally. It may be that father and son Thomas Jones I and II had, as was common in Wales, thrown their library open to a gifted but poor village boy, thus explaining the description of Joseph as 'self-taught'. By the time of Joseph's arrival in London the family name had firmly become Harris. A surprising aspect of the failure of Theophilus Jones to find any information about Joseph is that Joseph's only surviving child, Anna-Maria, heiress to both Joseph and his wealthy middle brother, Thomas, living, like Theophilus, in the Brecon area, and by then married to Samuel Hughes, himself High Sheriff of Brecon in 1790, was one of the subscribers to Theophilus's work.

In the last weeks of 1724 Joseph moved to London with letters of introduction from Brecknock MP Roger Jones. Within a few days of Joseph's arrival in London he met the Governor of New England at Roger Jones's home, and Edmond Halley was showing him 'a quadrant worth at least £300', so it may not be far from the truth to assume that the introductions included one to the then Astronomer Royal. Joseph's letter home is the first in a collection of more than 3300 documents made by Howell, Joseph's youngest brother, now available in digest form in Boyd Stanley Schlenther and Eryn Mant White's Calendar of the Trevecka Letters (2003). The manuscripts themselves now lie in the Llyfrgell Genedlaethol Cymru/National Library of Wales, Aberystwyth. They are in the trusteeship of the Calvinist Methodist Church of Wales, who have not permitted transcriptions of the manuscript correspondence to be published.

== Stellarum Fixarum Hemisphaerium Australe and Boreale ==
From instructions to his family on how to address replies Joseph seems to have moved in with John Senex (1678-1740), notable chart- and map-maker. He then writes about how kind his 'Master' is and how he has given him 'German radish' seeds which he sends on to his family in Trefeca to try out; he was perhaps apprenticed to, but certainly working with, Senex. They co-operated to produce at least two star-maps, Stellarum Fixarum Hemisphaerium Australe and Boreale; in the plane of the equator; Joseph's name is writ large in the headline text, though the copyright remained in the hands of Senex, as after his death his wife sold it. A copy of Joseph's chart was in the library of Mme. Emilie du Chatelet, mistress and colleague of Voltaire, which may be the one now in the Bibliothèque Nationale de France and perhaps seized from her son's library when he was beheaded during the French Revolution. Although the pair of star maps in the plane of the equator are well represented in astronomy museums, there is also a further pair in the plane of the ecliptic. It is likely that production of these charts was related to the premature, much contested and hotly resented publication by Halley and Newton of Flamsteed's long delayed observations of the stars. In the Australe chart Joseph commemorates Polish astronomer Hevelius and King Jan III Sobieski's defeat of the invading Ottoman Turks in the 1683 Battle of Vienna, for the constellation Scutum is named Scutum Sobiescanum and illustrated with a glowing crucifix and the initials INRI. It is not easy to date the first publication of these charts, partly because the date 1690 too is large in the title and the facile tendency has been to take that as the publication date; but 1690 is before Joseph was born and during the childhood of Senex. The most likely period for its creation is when Joseph was working for John Senex, from January 1725 until he left on a voyage to Vera Cruz in June of that same year. When he returned from Vera Cruz in April 1728 he immediately started work on self-publishing his Treatise of Navigation and producing for Thomas Wright, instrument maker, his Description and Use of the Globe; and the Orrery. But it is an area that calls for more research. Wolfgang Steinicke in 'William Herschel, Flamsteed Numbers and Harris's Star Maps' says that these star-maps were still being relied on by William Herschel towards the end of the century.

== South Sea Company Expedition ==
Only six months after his arrival in London, in late summer 1725, Joseph boarded a ship for the Gulf of Mexico. The South Sea Company traded there in slaves and goods under the Asiento agreement; the trade agreement allowed the company to send one ship of a limited size each year to sell goods in the fairs of Vera Cruz and Portobelo, but the company was stretching the agreement to send TWO ships, both loaded to the gunwales with goods. One ship would remain offshore while the other would sell its own cargo at the Fair, return to sea to be restocked by the first and again return to land to sell that second cargo. In 1725 the two ships were the Prince Frederick, under Captain Williams, and the Spotswood, under Captain Bradly; Joseph writes of going aboard a ship with £300,000 of goods and 250 men, but it isn't yet clear which of the two ships he was in. The South Sea Company had no difficulty in selling its goods, which were much in demand for their quality; but the Spanish government, faced with policing vast territories with inadequate forces, was not so keen and, in protest, seized the Prince Frederick, detaining her in the Gulf for several years while a complex international dispute played out. During his time in Vera Cruz Joseph observed and described a partial eclipse of the Sun and was unable, because of overcast skies, to observe a predicted eclipse of the Moon. He established the latitude of Vera Cruz as 19° 12'N and its longitude as 97° 30'W to within 1° of its actual position (but the site of Vera Cruz has been changed more than once in its existence because of disease generated by surrounding swamps and forest); this was done decades before the development of Harrison's chronometer which facilitated the establishment of longitude by providing accurate timekeeping. These observations, sponsored by Halley, are recorded as "Astronomical Observation Made at Vera Cruz" in the Transactions of the Royal Society, but the astronomical dates in the Transaction need to be corrected for the calendar shift in September 1752. By our calendar now the eclipse of the Sun viewed in Vera Cruz occurred on 22 March 1727 (NS).

== A Treatise of Navigation ==
By 11 April 1728, Joseph had returned to London, some years ahead of the Prince Frederick, and several of his subsequent letters speak of its continued detention, the death of its Captain Williams in Vera Cruz and the political events around the negotiations. Joseph's months at sea (three in each direction for Vera Cruz) had not been wasted and early in 1730 he published at his own expense A Treatise of Navigation, full of advice to improve techniques of seamanship and offering two new models of nautical instrument; he deposited for copyright several copies of the treatise at the Stationers' Hall in the middle of February 1730(NS).

The sale price was 12 shillings (60p) and its subscribers are many, varied and of much interest still: they included five members of the Royal Society (Halley among them), the Earl of Godolphin, Alexander Pope, Ann Knight (wealthy daughter of James Craggs, Postmaster General in the Government, who in March 1721 had taken a lethal dose of laudanum the night before he was due to be questioned by a Parliamentary Inquiry into the South Sea Bubble), as well as many other Brecknock and London luminaries. One subscriber not otherwise known is listed as Joseph Harris, Esq. At the sale of his library six months after his death, the catalogue included over 100 unsold, and probably unbound, copies of this work. The work became a best-seller in Italy for the next 100 years, and this entry in the catalogue raises the possibility that those very copies, purchased in February 1765, were the precipitating factor in its popularity there. One positive impression of the treatise from a naval officer was as follows:

What I was not looking for when I opened a book on navigation published in 1730 was clarity, but to my surprise that is exactly what I got. There is strong internal evidence that Harris writes with some considerable experience of deep sea voyaging. This practical background is combined with a solid understanding of those principles you would expect a "teacher of the mathematicks" to know and an evident determination to improve the practice of navigation by "persons of ordinary capacity". [...]

— Rear Admiral Mark Kerr

== Description and Use of the Globes; and the Orrery ==
Just after the publication of the Treatise of Navigation another work appeared over Joseph's name: Description and Use of the Globes; and the Orrery. An instruction manual, it proved very popular and ran into many editions over the rest of the century. Oddly though, it is never mentioned by Joseph or his family in their correspondence, all references to 'my book' being apparently to the Treatise; and in the eighth edition in 1757 the name of Joseph Harris appears over a description of him as 'Teacher of the Mathematics' despite his having by this time been King's Assay Master for eight years and in the Royal Mint for twenty-one. Sadly for Joseph's fame, the first edition carried only his initials, J.H., perhaps because the publisher or bookseller was hoping to cash in on the then greater fame of the late John Harris, F.R.S.; unfortunately the idea was floated in the Bibliotheca Britannica (perhaps by a sleepy clerk) that Joseph's was simply an edition of a similarly titled work of John Harris, but they are entirely different from each other. Although an excellent teaching volume, it was basically a puff for large orreries, beautifully illustrated in the actual volume (though not in the current reproductions, which have mostly failed to open out the large folded illustrations) and for sale at the Fleet Street shop of Thomas Wright, such as had been supplied, according to later editions, to 'His Majesty at Kensington', the Duke of Argyll and the New Royal Academy at Portsmouth. The long-standing mistake in the authorship is only now being corrected.

== Voyage to Jamaica ==
Late in 1730 he sailed westward again, this time to Jamaica. He went as an employee of the Hon. Colin Campbell, to carry out an experiment devised by George Graham and to supervise a cargo of astronomical instruments destined to establish an observatory there. The instruments were eventually bequeathed to Glasgow University by the later purchaser, Alexander Macfarlane, and returned to Scotland between 1757 and 1760, where they formed the basis of the university's Macfarlane Observatory. Colin Campbell wrote that Joseph Harris was taken ill in Jamaica and returned home early as a result; but although Joseph suffered an initial bout of what he (and later in another context Mungo Park) called 'sever seasoning' (perhaps malaria), and said was unavoidable for all newcomers, he afterwards wrote an extensive and interesting letter home describing the island and claiming full health; indeed he stayed until April 1732, longer than he had anticipated before he left London. On his way home during the summer of 1732 he made two observations which were subsequently published in the Transactions of the Royal Society, this time sponsored by George Graham: "An Account of Some Mathematical Observations Made in the Months of May, June and July 1732; as also the Description of a Water-Spout".

Back in London in early July he looked again for work. At the beginning of September 1732 Joseph travelled to Cranbury in Hampshire to stay for a month at the home of John Conduitt MP. Conduitt had succeeded Sir Isaac Newton as Master of the Royal Mint and was married to Newton's half-niece, Catherine Barton Conduitt; Newton lived there for his last years until his death in 1727. Joseph's eventual appointment in January 1736 to a junior position at the Royal Mint may well have owed something to this visit.

In 1733 Joseph hoped to get an appointment to a Portsmouth mathematical school, but commented sadly that other candidates were 'backed by great interests'; so in August of the same year he started to work at Gossfield Hall, Essex, for the family of Ann Knight, née Craggs, and John Knight MP; he was almost certainly tutoring James Newsome, her son by an earlier marriage, perhaps in navigation for a career in the Navy. There he certainly came to know well Walter Harte, and a year or so later was thanked by him, for help with what Harte called his 'Pamphlet', by date likely to have been Harte's Essay on Reason. The Essay was written after the sudden and unexpected death of John Knight in October 1733 and contains an elegy to him. Ann Knight subsequently appointed Walter Harte Rector of Gossfield's St. Catherine's church. Shortly after this, Joseph used his friendship with Walter Harte in an apparently unsuccessful attempt to get his youngest brother Howell into Saint Mary Hall, Oxford, now part of Oriel College. The only record of Howell's presence at Saint Mary Hall is the single day of his matriculation, 25 November 1735, and there is no sign that he ever slept or ate there, although his registration fees continued to be paid until 1738.

== Marriage ==
Throughout his years in London, Joseph loved Anne Jones (who moved with her family from Trefeca, Joseph's birthplace, to nearby Tredustan just across the Llynfi river), but he doubted that it was reciprocated. But about 1730, just before he left for Jamaica, he began to suspect, perhaps from his mother Susanna, that maybe all was not lost, and early in 1733 wrote a passionate letter to Howell about how his despairing love for her had made it impossible for him to settle down. A correspondence started, and when Joseph wasn't in Wales, Howell was the intermediary; we know from Joseph's letters that he enclosed missives and books for her in his letters home, but we don't know how often she replied. Howell kept almost every scrap of writing that came to the Trefeca Teulu, but no comparable collection by Joseph of letters he received has come down to us. At that time a woman's reputation had to be protected at all costs as her future marriageability depended on it; Joseph was aware of this and secured Anne from gossip. He wanted to marry her, but knew that he could not until he was financially secure; shortly after Joseph took up his appointment at the Mint, Anne Jones and he were married on 31 October 1736 at Saint Benet's Church, Paul's Wharf near Saint Paul's Cathedral. There is no mention of the ceremony in any of the family's correspondence, and we have no idea how many of his Welsh family came to London to celebrate with them! They had no fewer than five children, two boys and three girls. The baptisms of the last four of them and the burials of all but one daughter are listed in Mint records. Only Anna-Maria survived to adulthood. This mortality is perhaps not surprising when one considers the position of their Tower home: the foetid River Thames on one side, the filthy London streets on another, and the graves of many executions alongside.

== Appointment to the Royal Mint ==
By early 1736 Joseph knew that he had been appointed to the Royal Mint, as assistant to Hopton Haynes, Master's Assay Master. He and his younger brother Thomas, a tailor, had been sharing lodgings, but Thomas now wrote that Joseph was to move into the Mint on Lady Day 1735/6 (25 March 1736). The appointment was confirmed by Treasury warrant on 6 April 1737.

Joseph occupied a house at the Royal Mint in the Tower of London until his death in 1764, though he did have a second home in what was then countryside and market gardens in the Grove Street area of Hackney. Howell mentions it in diary entries from June 1746 to September 1749, and there are Poor Rate levies on Joseph there to 1752. From early 1760 he spent a lot of time at a country house he rented, or had placed at his disposal, in Lewisham, called Place House.

Despite his position at the Mint, Joseph retained his interest in navigation, and in the Transactions of the Royal Society 1739-41 41 an article by him was published, entitled "An Account of an Improvement on the Terrestrial Globe". As an indication, perhaps, of the increasing respect the Royal Society accorded him, he was entitled 'Gentleman' and needed no intermediary.

== Dispute within the family ==
There is a gap in the exchange of letters from 1738 to 1740, which is filled by legal documents in the National Archive rediscovered in 2015. It seems that Joseph's father-in-law, Thomas Jones II, became Sheriff of Brecon for the year 1722, and during that notoriously expensive period of office he overspent disastrously. As a result, he resorted to the device of sharing his land with his daughters, of whom one, of course, was Anne, and requiring them to collect rents due in return for a small allowance of £40 per annum for himself. Of extra interest is that the court papers reveal the existence of a third daughter, JoAnna, in addition to the already known Anne and Mary, though it doesn't provide any more primary evidence of any of their dates of birth. Joseph and Anne now lived in London, and this may be the reason that a third, local person, Lewis Jones, acted as the Harris's agent. Complicating the court action JoAnna married her attorney, John Meredith, scion of a dominant local family, in the course of the case; he too had collected rents at times and had promised the tenants protection from legal action when they did so. Several of the witnesses in the case no longer even remembered Joseph, who had left the area in 1724. The evidence showed dispute over the recording of payments and receipts. This is a fascinating new piece of information for the area, taking evidence as it does from many of the Brecknock worthies who appear again and again in other contexts. The outcome is not known, as the court papers do not include the decision (if there was one, rather than an out-of-court settlement), but Joseph and Anne remained in possession of the land which had been transferred to her, and were able to commission his youngest brother's artisanal/religious community, or Teulu to do building work on the family's main possession, Tredustan Court.

== Lima Treasure ==
In 1745 two English privateers captured two of three French ships returning from the Gulf of Mexico with Treasure from Lima. The haul, valued by some at £800,000 (approximately £120,000,000 nowadays) was taken to the Mint to be melted down and some of the coins stamped with the word LIMA. In Joseph's letters home at this time he talks of working under enormous pressure all hours around the clock.

== Promotion to the King's Assay-master ==
In 1749 Joseph was promoted to the senior position of King's Assay-master in the Mint, with a specific requirement that he set up a training structure to ensure an orderly succession for the future. Such structure as there was involved two parallel hierarchies: the senior branch was the King's assayers, and the junior branch the Master's assayers, each originally keeping an eye, one assumes, on the work of the other. Joseph arranged that, starting at the lowest position in the ranks of the Master's assayers, the next promotion would be to the same position in the King's assayers, then back to the Master's assayers until eventual arrival at the top as King's assay-master. This orderly system laid a stable foundation for decades to come for the increasing influence and importance of the Mint.

== Founding the Brecknockshire Agricultural Society ==
"At a Ploughing Match near Trevecka in 1754, Howell Harris and some other people from the locality discussed the formation of a Brecknockshire Agricultural Society. There was at that time a County Club for Gentlemen in existence at Brecon and in March 1755 this became the Brecknockshire Agricultural Society. Howell Harris was not one of the original members of the Society. Howell and his brother Joseph Harris, were made Honorary Members in 1756 'in recognition of the offer of soldiers and contribution to their funds'" John Davies "Howell Harris and the Trevecka Settlement'. It is likely that a January 1756 'Report of the Agricultural Society to prepare a scheme to develop a market in the county for woollen yarns' was written for them by Joseph. This agricultural society was the second established in the country.

On 2 April 1757 Joseph, after another period of serious illness, wrote to his brother, Howell, that 'His Majesty hath been graciously pleased to grant me for life an additional allowance of £300 a year and I am to have a deputy to assist me in the office. I expect my Patent next week.'

== Essay upon Money and Coins: Parts One, Two and Three ==
Harris's Essay has received plaudits from many eminent writers. J. R. McCulloch rated it "one of the best and most valuable treatises on the subject of money ever written". Joseph Schumpeter said it "has some claim to being considered one of the best eighteenth century performances in the field of monetary analysis." Hayek described it as "one of the first systematic treatises on money in the English language."

The themes of the essay were originally developed in conversations between Harris and the then prime minister, Henry Pelham. Pelham had apparently intended to implement the regulations for money and coins proposed by Harris but was prevented by his unexpected death in 1754.

Parts I and II of the essay were published respectively in 1757 and 1758. It was these that received the plaudits mentioned. Only in recent years has a manuscript Part III come to light. This was transcribed and edited in the three months between Harris's unexpected death in 1764 and the end of the year, from notes he left behind, by his assistant, Stanesby Alchorne.

Part I was designed to "unfold the theories of commerce, money and exchanges"; part II to "show that the established standard of money should not be violated or altered under any pretence whatsoever"; part III proposes "some regulations for remedying the present bad state of our coin, and for obviating all cause of complaint about our money for the future".

There are striking differences between the three Parts not only in subject matter but also in what they reveal about contrasting aspects of Harris's character. Part I is a lucid and balanced statement of economic and monetary principles (particularly interesting on the division of labour but deficient on interest rates and the velocity of circulation). Part II is largely a vehement attack, bitter in irony and sarcasm, on any obtuse enough to dispute the principles of Part I; these advocates of debasement are "assassins in the dark", "wrong-headed politicians", "wily projectors". Part III shows Harris the innovative but essentially practical monetary reformer.

Some of the authors who seem to have helped to crystallise Harris's opinions, even when he disagreed with them, were Locke, John Law, Newton, Cantillon and Hume. But what influence did he, in turn, have on subsequent writers and statesmen? One can reasonably trace two threads of this kind, one to Adam Smith, the other to the Bank Charter Act 1844.

Alfred Marshall named Harris, along with Petty, Barbon, Locke and Cantillon, as "a principal guide to Adam Smith". Professor Mizuta, in his fine catalogue of Smith's library, says Harris's Essay "seems to be one of the works on political economy most frequently used by Adam Smith."

The Bank Charter Act 1844 enshrined an almost unalloyed gold standard which preserved the value of money through the years of Britain's economic and political pre-eminence. The act's chief architects were Robert Peel and the formidable banker later to be ennobled as Lord Overstone. There is an authenticated line of filiation from Harris's Essay to the first Lord Liverpool, from the first Lord Liverpool to his son, prime minister Liverpool, and from the second Lord Liverpool to Robert Peel. Similar filiation can be traced from the Essay to J.R. McCulloch and from McCulloch to Lord Overstone. The latter, of course, was also an influence on Peel.

Joseph Harris was arguably the sternest of all champions of hard money and of an immutable standard of value. Today there is a consensus that an inflation rate of 2% is an appropriate target and that crises are legitimately washed away by a flood of new money. Management good, automatism bad. Should circumstances ever cause us to question our present certainties and to search in older texts for new perspectives, awareness of Harris's Essay would not go amiss.

== Concern with Weights and Measures ==
Increasingly seen as a safe pair of hands, in 1758 he produced a Report of the Parliamentary Committee appointed to enquire into the original Standards of Weights and Measures. This remained a pre-occupation for the rest of his life, and on 6 April 1763, Jérôme Lalande (then Professor of Astronomy at the Collège Royale and eventually director of the Paris Observatory), on a journey round London and the home counties and having persuaded friends to arrange a meeting with Joseph at the Tower of London, wrote that 'he promised me a standard weight as soon as there was one from the workbench'. The standard weights and measures made by him (or to his order) can be seen now in the Science Museum, London.

== The Honourable Society of Cymmrodorion ==
Joseph Harris's connections with Wales remained strong all his life. Shortly after the inception of the Cymmrodorion as 'a social, cultural, literary and philanthropic institution', a London-based Welsh learned society, he is listed in 1759 as a Corresponding Member with an abode in the Mint Tower.

== Observation of the 1761 Transit of Venus ==
In 1760, after yet another long bout of ill health, he decided to make his own observations of 6 June 1761 Transit of Venus across the Sun, and to make them from the village of his birth, Trefeca, where his brother Howell was building up a Teulu or 'Family', a religious commune of artisans. Sending down equipment ahead of his own arrival, Joseph used his telescope first to create a meridian line in the Teulu building (now the Methodist Coleg Trefeca). This denoted the exact time of midday there (an adjunct of longitude and therefore varying as to what line of longitude the observer was on), and became for a while the arbiter of time for the area as neighbours dropped in to set their watches at midday. Having created the meridian line, he observed the departure of Venus across the Sun's edge (Venus being already part of the way across the face of the Sun at sunrise at Trefeca). This work was written up and towards the end of November 1761 he arranged to send the account to Lord Macclesfield, then President of the Royal Society. It maybe wasn't sent to, or was mislaid by, Lord Macclesfield, and the first publication of Joseph's "Account of the Transit of Venus over the Sun 6 June 1761" was in January 2010, when a transcript of it and other contemporary letters and diary entries appeared in the journal Brycheiniog. Coleg Trefeca still displays a Newtonian telescope which Joseph is said to have made himself and to have used for the observations; but two or three dents in it are evidence of the lack of help that he received during his observations. The meridian line was never of interest to Howell, (who dismissed Joseph's learning as mere 'head knowledge') and, forgotten, it was later destroyed in new building works.

== Boodles Club ==
Surprisingly, in 1762 Joseph appears, perhaps at the request of Lord Shelburne, then President of the Board of Trade, to have joined, and perhaps acted as Membership Secretary of, the newly founded Boodle's Club. The names of other members on the same page as his own listed only Adam Smith, David Hume and other members of the Scottish Enlightenment. This membership book, in handwriting indistinguishable by this writer from Joseph's own, ceased suddenly at about the same time as the death of Joseph's wife in April 1763.

== Death ==
In Spring 1763 Joseph's wife Anne died unexpectedly; she was buried on 25 April. Joseph was bereft but, as always, expressed patient resignation to what he saw as God's will, though he and his daughter, Anna-Maria, travelled extensively afterwards to expunge sad memories. A year and a half later, on 26 September 1764, he too died unexpectedly after a short illness and was buried on 5 October in the crypt of Saint Peter ad Vincula in the Tower, a site now lost in later alterations. His epitaph in Saint Gwendolen's Church, Talgarth, reads:

His great Abilities, and unshaken Integrity were uniformly directed to the Good of his Country by indefatigable Attention having gained Proficiency in every branch of Scientific Knowledge. As an author published several Tracts on different Subjects. Invented many Instruments, Monuments of his Mathematical Genius. Yet superior to the love of Fame, forbore even having his name engraven on them. His political Talents were well known to the Ministers of Power in his Days, who fail'd not to improve on all the Wise and learned Ideas, which greatness of Mind, Candour with love of his Country led him to Communicate. His Reward --- In HEAVEN!

== Essay upon Money and Coin: Part Three ==
In the three months immediately after his death, his assistant, Stanesby Alchorne, wrote by hand a Part III to the Essay Upon Money and Coins and had it bound with a printed copy each of Parts I and II, '...proposing some regulations, for remedying the present bad state of our Coin, and for obviating all cause of complaint about our Money for the future'. Stanesby Alchorne attributed his familiarity with Joseph's thoughts to 'having had frequent opportunities, during seven years close intimacy with Mr Harris, of perusing the original manuscript, and hearing the several parts repeatedly explained and enlarged upon'. The complete manuscript came to this writer's attention only during the year 2012 and has not so far been published; as soon as it is, a reference will be placed on this Wikipedia article.

== A Treatise of Optics ==
In his Tower of London home Joseph left behind a number of experiments set up to establish the nature of light and of optics. Eleven years later friends published a volume based on as many of the experiments as they could. The volume, published over his name in 1775, was A Treatise of Optics, but unfortunately the compilers declared themselves to have been unable to reconstruct more than a small proportion of them.

His surviving daughter Anna-Maria remained in the Tower of London house for some time after his death, and was probably responsible for arranging the sale of her father's library on 11 February 1765. It was either she or her uncle, Thomas Harris (disapproving father-in-law of actress and writer Mary Robinson) who placed the elegant memorial plaque to Joseph in Saint Gwendolen's church, Talgarth, Powys. Eventually she moved back to Brecon and, with the money from her parents and the large, unexpected inheritance of the estate of her wealthy uncle Thomas, Joseph's younger brother, started a respected line of descendants in Brecknockshire.
