= 1752 in Great Britain =

Events from the year 1752 in Great Britain.

== Incumbents ==
- Monarch – George II
- Prime Minister – Henry Pelham (Whig)

== Events ==
- 1 January – the British Empire (except Scotland, which had changed New Year's Day to 1 January in 1600) adopts today as the first day of the year as part of adoption of the Gregorian calendar, which is completed in September: today is the first day of the New Year under the terms of last year's Calendar Act.
- 26 February – first performance of Handel's oratorio Jephtha in London.
- 17 March – Parliament passes a bill to bestow estates forfeited by Jacobites to the Crown and to use the revenue to develop the Scottish Highlands.
- 1 June – Murder Act 1751 comes into effect, providing that the bodies of hanged murderers should suffer public dissection or (for men) hanging in the gibbet.
- 14 June – Robert Clive forces the surrender of French troops in the aftermath of the Siege of Trichinopoly in India.
- 3–13 September inclusive – these dates are omitted from the calendar in the British Empire as part of the adoption of the Gregorian calendar to correct the discrepancy between the Old Style and New Style dates under the terms of last year's Calendar Act. Claims of riots over the perceived loss of the days are without contemporary authority.

=== Undated ===
- Henry Pelham, Prime Minister and Chancellor of the Exchequer, converts all outstanding issues of redeemable government stock into one bond, Consolidated 3.5% Annuities (consols), in order to reduce the coupon (interest rate) paid on the government debt.
- Foundation of what will become the Manchester Royal Infirmary as a cottage hospital in Garden Street, Manchester, by Charles White (surgeon).

== Publications ==
- Letters on the Study of History, Henry St John, 1st Viscount Bolingbroke posthumously.
- Essay on Musical Expression, Charles Avison.

== Births ==
- 18 January
  - Josiah Boydell, painter and publisher (died 1817)
  - John Nash, architect (died 1835)
- March – Edward Jones (Bardd y Brenin), Welsh harpist (died 1824)
- 21 April – Humphry Repton, garden designer (died 1818)
- 13 June – Fanny Burney, novelist and diarist (died 1840)
- 30 July – Valentine Quin, 1st Earl of Dunraven and Mount-Earl, Irish peer (died 1824)
- 14 October – John Milner, Roman Catholic bishop and religious controversialist (died 1826)
- 20 November – Thomas Chatterton, poet (died 1770)

== Deaths ==
- 16 January – Francis Blomefield, topographer (born 1705)
- 3 May – Samuel Ogle, provincial Governor of Maryland (born 1694)
- 23 May – William Bradford, printer (born 1663)
- 16 June – Joseph Butler, priest and theologian (born 1692)
- 22 August – William Whiston, mathematician (born 1667)
- 6 November – Ralph Erskine, minister (born 1685)
- 8 November – James of the Glen, wrongfully hanged as an accessory to the Appin Murder in Scotland (year of birth unknown)

== See also ==
- 1752 in Wales
