= 1760 in Great Britain =

Events from the year 1760 in Great Britain. This year sees a change of monarch.

== Incumbents ==
- Monarch – George II (until 25 October), George III (starting 25 October)
- Prime Minister – Thomas Pelham-Holles, 1st Duke of Newcastle (Whig)

== Events ==
- 22 January – Seven Years' War: At the Battle of Wandiwash in India, British general Sir Eyre Coote is victorious over the French under Marquis de Bussy-Castelnau.
- 15 February – HMS Royal Katherine runs aground off Bolt Head, South Devon, with the loss of 699 lives.
- 21–26 February – Seven Years' War: At the Battle of Carrickfergus in the north of Ireland, a force of French troops under the command of privateer François Thurot captures and holds the town and castle of Carrickfergus before retiring; the force is defeated (and Thurot killed) in the naval Battle of Bishops Court in the Irish Sea on 28 February.
- June – Scottish Presbyterian preacher Dr. James Fordyce moves to London.
- 3 July – a lightning strike causes a major fire at Portsmouth Royal Dockyard; substantial rebuilding follows.
- 31 July – Seven Years' War: At the Battle of Warburg, the British-Hanoverian army of Ferdinand of Brunswick storms Warburg, with a heroic role being played by the British commander Lord Granby.
- 8 September – Seven Years' War: Jeffery Amherst captures Montreal.
- 25 October – George III ascends to the throne following the death of his grandfather George II. He will reign until 29 January 1820. He surrenders the income from the Crown Estate to the government in exchange for a civil list contribution to maintaining the Royal Household.
- Thomas Braidwood establishes Braidwood's Academy for the Deaf and Dumb in Edinburgh, the first school for the deaf in Britain.

== Publications ==
- James Macpherson's Fragments of Ancient Poetry collected in the Highlands of Scotland.
- Geologist John Michell's essay "Conjectures concerning the Cause and Observations upon the Phaenomena of Earthquakes".
- Laurence Sterne's comic metafictional novel The Life and Opinions of Tristram Shandy, Gentleman (books 1–2, dated this year but published in December 1759).

== Births ==
- 28 March – Thomas Clarkson, abolitionist (died 1846)
- 27 October – Sir Richard Strachan, 6th Baronet, Royal Navy Admiral (died 1828)
- probable – Lemuel Francis Abbott, portrait painter (died 1802)

== Deaths ==
- 5 May – Laurence Shirley, 4th Earl Ferrers, murderer (hanged) (born 1720)
- 30 September – Maria Coventry, Countess of Coventry, society beauty (lead poisoning) (born 1732)
- 25 October – King George II of Great Britain (born 1683, Hanover)

== See also ==
- 1760 in Wales
