= John Owen (chancellor of Bangor) =

Welsh priest and opponent of Methodism

John Owen (1698–1755) was a Welsh priest who became Chancellor of Bangor Cathedral. He was a staunch opponent of Methodism and was regarded as having a "troublesome litigious temper", bringing Methodist supporters in front of the ecclesiastical courts and having some excommunicated.

== Life ==
Owen was born in Llanidloes, Wales in 1698 and studied at Jesus College, Oxford, from 1719. It is unclear whether he obtained a degree from the University of Oxford, but he is thought to have incorporated at the University of Cambridge (Trinity Hall) in 1741, obtaining LLB and LLD degrees in 1742 and 1751 respectively. After ordination, he became vicar of Llannor with Deneio (near Pwllheli, Gwynedd) in 1723, becoming canon of Bangor Cathedral in 1742 and Chancellor in 1743. In 1745, he was additionally appointed rector of Llantrisant, Anglesey; whilst his date of death is unknown, his successor was installed "because of the death of J. Owen" on 8 November 1755.

During his clerical career, Owen was known to be strongly opposed to Methodism, complaining about the Methodist nature of circulating schools in the area and taking proceedings in the ecclesiastical courts against those who supported Methodists, often leading to excommunication. On one action, he prosecuted a priest who had allowed a circulating school to function in his parish; the case took three years to resolve and, whilst the priest was acquitted, he still had to leave his farm. One contemporary of Owen, the priest John Lewis, said that Owen was "famous for a troublesome litigious temper" and thought it strange that the Bishop of Bangor would want to appoint him Chancellor.
