= Gumfreston =

Village and parish in Pembrokeshire, Wales

Coordinates: 51.678°N 4.736°W

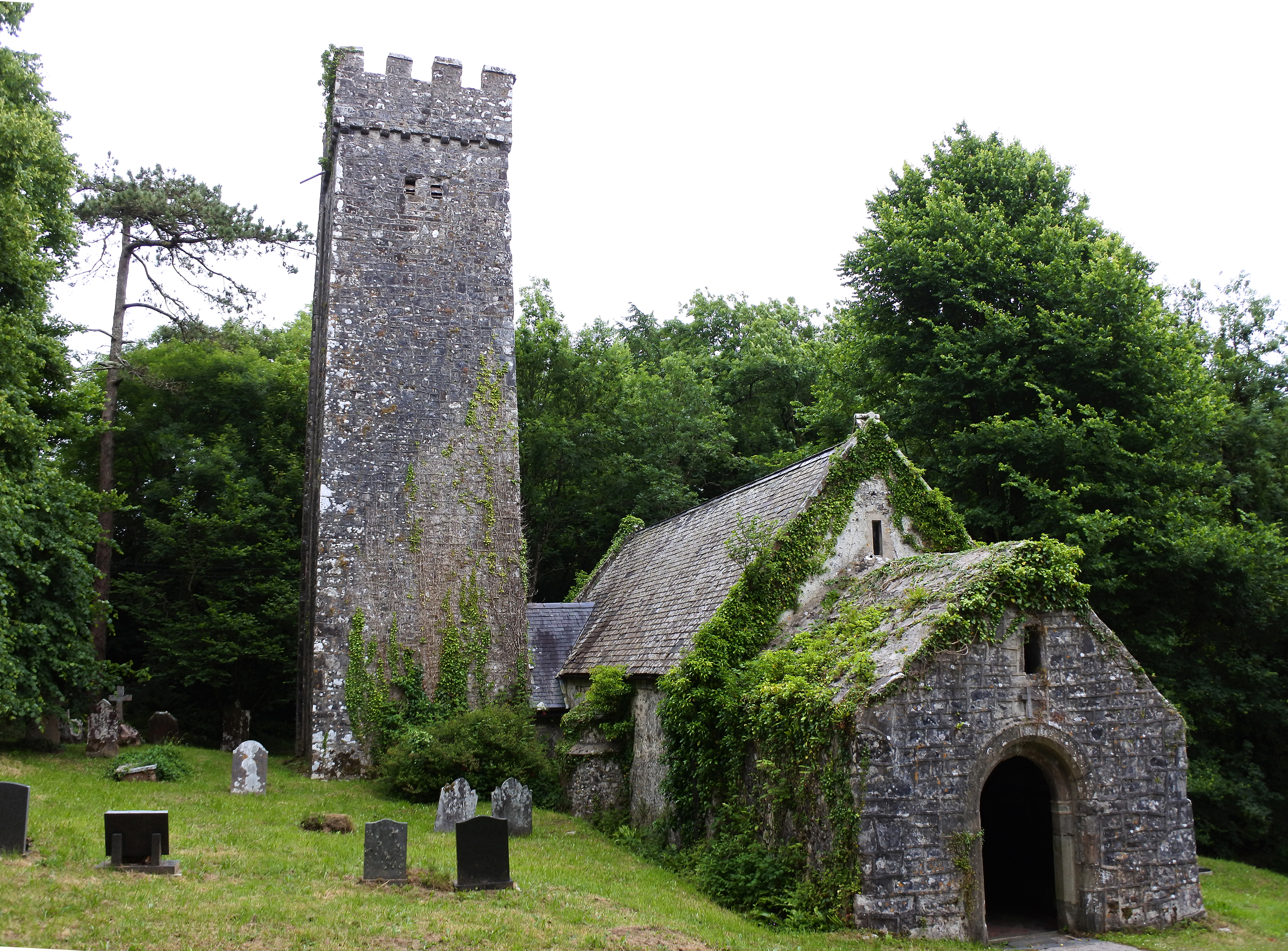
- Parish church of St Lawrence

- Location within Pembrokeshire
- Population: 103
- OS grid reference: SN109012
- Principal area: Pembrokeshire
- Country: Wales
- Sovereign state: United Kingdom
- Police: Dyfed-Powys
- Fire: Mid and West Wales
- Ambulance: Welsh

Gumfreston is a parish and small village 1 mile (1.6 km) from St. Florence and 2 miles (3.2 km) from Tenby, south Pembrokeshire, Wales. It is in the community of St. Mary Out Liberty. The B4318 is the main road that passes through Gumfreston.

== Parish ==
=== History ===
The parish appears on a 1578 parish map of Pembrokeshire. There are a few houses in the village, but no other significant settlements in the mainly rural parish from a pre-1850 map. In 1833 the parish was reported as having 103 inhabitants. Coal was worked on a small scale for local use. The village is recorded as a historic place name by the Royal Commission in the early 20th century. There are three named farms on modern maps: Daisy Back Farm, Glebe Farm and Gumfreston Farm, and a farm complex named North Astridge and South Astridge.

=== Feudal title ===
The ancient feudal title of the Manor of Wedlock, or Wydeloc, resides in the parish but is not associated with a manor house or land. The title was sold at auction in Cardiff in December 2016 for £2,000.

=== Church ===
The small church St Lawrence's, with its tall tower, is mediaeval. The church is significant for the historic architecture, for a medieval wall painting, and for the three nearby springs reputed to be ancient healing wells that attract visitors from many countries.

== Notable people ==
- William Wogan (1678–1758), born in Gumfreston, an Irish religious writer, sympathetic with early Methodism.
