= John Williams (evangelical priest) =

Welsh Anglican clergyman

John Williams (1762 – 3 April 1802) was a Welsh Anglican clergyman with Methodist sympathies. He also published a book of sermons.

== Life ==
Williams, from Fishguard, Pembrokeshire, Wales, was born in 1762. He was educated at Jesus College, Oxford, from 1783, but there is no evidence that he graduated. He was ordained in 1785 and, after a spell as a private tutor and curate, he was given charge of the Pembrokeshire parishes of Burton and Williamston in addition to being curate of Rosemarket. He became vicar of Begelly in 1793. He was sympathetic towards the Methodist movement, and was on good terms with Methodist clergy such as Thomas Charles; non-conformist clergy who visited Begelly were welcome guests at his home. He published Twenty Sermons on Miscellaneous Subjects (1805). He died in Begelly on 3 April 1802.
