= Thomas Richards (priest) =

Thomas Richards (c.1687–1760) was a Welsh Anglican priest and writer.

== Life ==
Richards was born in about 1687 in Llanychaearn, Cardiganshire, south Wales and educated at Jesus College, Oxford, where Joseph Trapp, the Oxford Professor of Poetry, described him as the best Latin poet since Virgil. Richards was ordained and was appointed as rector of Newtown in 1713. He became a canon of St Asaph's Cathedral in 1718, and rector of Llansannan in 1720 (a sinecure appointment). From 1718 until he died, he was additionally the rector of Llanfyllin Powys, Mid Wales. His literary contributions included translations of popular songs (from English to Welsh), an elegy on the death in 1737 of Queen Caroline (the wife of King George II), sermons and satires (including one called Hogland: or a description of Hampshire, in response to another author's satirical attack on Wales). He was a member of the Honourable Society of Cymmrodorion in 1759. He died in 1760, and was buried in Llanfyllin.
