= Henry Davies (Baptist minister) =

Henry Davies (1753 – 9 May 1825) was a Welsh Baptist minister. His family lived in the Letterston area of Pembrokeshire, where he trained to work as a shoemaker. He attended services at the local chapel, and in 1775 began to preach at Letterston, before, in 1780, being ordained a joint pastor of Llangloffan (a position which he held for forty-five years). After marrying, he lived as a farmer on a farm at Pencerrig near Fishguard.

When the French landed near Fishguard in 1797, the invaders raided his farm, but, despite this, he was charged with ‘collaboration.’ The charge was later dropped, but his effigy was burnt by demonstrators at Fishguard Fair in February 1798.

He died in 1825, in his early seventies, and was buried in Hermon burial ground, Fishguard.
