= Richard Griffiths (industrialist) =

Welsh industrial pioneer (1756–1826)

Richard Griffiths (1756–1826) was a Welsh industrial pioneer. Griffiths is notable for building the first recognised transport links into the Rhondda Valley paving the way for future coal exploration into one of the world's richest coal fields.

== Personal history ==
Griffiths was a member of the Gellifendigaid family of Llanwonno; he was the third child, and second son to William Griffiths and Elizabeth (née Davies). He was christened on 13 January 1756, and was brought up in a very strong Methodist family. Griffiths practised medicine in Cardiff but it was through his family connections that he began prospecting in mineral rights for which he became best known. Griffiths is described as a 'dynamic and colourful personality', and a practical joker, even arranging a comical funeral for himself. He died in 1826, with his will being proven of 31 May.

== Business career ==
Griffiths' youngest sister was married to Evan Morgan, who owned a farm estate in the Lower Rhondda near modern-day Trehafod, the Hafod Fawr Estate. In 1808, Griffiths obtained a lease for the mineral rights for the farm from his brother-in-law. Griffiths then made two sub-leases for these rights in 1809 and gave the right to Jeremiah Homfray to open a level below the Estate on the east side of the River Rhondda. Homfray continued to work the level until his bankruptcy in 1813.

To make the estate more profitable, Griffiths decided to improve the transportation links from the site to the newly opened Glamorganshire Canal. The Canal linked the ironworks at Merthyr Tydfil to the ports of Cardiff, and both were open markets for coal. The existing system of transporting coal to the canal was through the use of pack horses, which were slow and inefficient due to the weight of coal each horse could carry. Griffiths first built a tramroad from the Hafod Estate to the town of Newbridge, now known as Pontypridd, and there bridged the River Taff. He then gained access to the Glamorganshire Canal by building a short length of private canal, which became known as the 'Doctor's Canal'. The tramline, which was serviced by horses pulling wagons along its length, was opened for business 29 September 1809, becoming the very first transportation link into the Rhondda Valley.

Although several early sources state that Griffiths was the first coal pioneer of the Rhondda, opening a coal level at Gyffeillion in 1790, these facts have been contradicted by later sources. Griffiths himself denied owning a coal level in a series of replies to a Select committee to the House of Commons of the United Kingdom in 1810. The committee was examining the petition of South Wales colliery owners concerning tax on coal, Griffiths stated categorically that he has no colliery and nor had he ever owned one. Though many modern sources still reiterate the erroneous fact that Griffiths opened a mine in the Lower Rhondda in 1790.

The transport link to the Glamorganshire Canal proved itself when Walter Coffin, who is recognised as the first person to gain personal rights and sink the first deep mines in the Rhondda, obtained rights to use Griffiths' tramroad. Coffin's mine was further up the valley at Dinas, and Coffin needed to build his own four mile tramline to connect his colliery to Griffiths' link at Trehafod.

On Griffiths' death the rights to the Trehafod Estate passed to his family and was successfully deep mined by John Calvert in 1851. Griffiths' tramline was used until it was replaced by the Taff Vale Railway in 1841.

== Bibliography ==
- Davies, John; Jenkins, Nigel (2008). The Welsh Academy Encyclopaeia of Wales. Cardiff: University of Wales Press. ISBN 978-0-7083-1953-6.
- Evans, C.J.O. (1948). Glamorgan, its History and Topography. Cardiff: William Lewis.
- Lewis, E.D. (1959). The Rhondda Valleys. London: Phoenix House.
- Lloyd, John Edward; Jenkins, R.T. (1958). The Dictionary of Welsh Biography, Down to 1940. Cardiff: William Lewis.
