= William Jones (Welsh priest) =

Welsh evangelical clergyman

William Jones (18 November 1755 – 12 October 1821) was a Welsh evangelical clergyman, who was a friend and correspondent of the prominent Welsh cleric Thomas Charles.

== Life ==
Jones was born on 18 November 1755 in Abergavenny, south Wales and studied at Jesus College, Oxford, from 1773 or 1774 until 1777. He became friends with Thomas Charles, who was studying at the college at the same time, and corresponded frequently with him thereafter. He broke off his studies in 1778 on being appointed tutor to the family of a Government servant in Jamaica, but returned to England in 1780, graduated and was ordained. He was curate (1781–1801) and then vicar of Broxbourne and Hoddesdon in Hertfordshire; he had feared that his Methodist views would prevent his appointment as vicar. Twelve years before his death, he acquired a coffin for use when he died. During the remainder of his life, he used it as a bookshelf. However, when he died in Broxbourne on 12 October 1821, the coffin proved to be too small for him.
