= Simon Lloyd (archdeacon of Merioneth) =

Simon Lloyd was a Welsh Anglican priest in the 17th century.

Lloyd was educated at Trinity College, Cambridge. He held livings at Llansilin, Newtown, Bettws, Llanynys, Llanfihangel-y-traethau and Llandudno. He was appointed archdeacon of Merioneth in 1672, a post he held until his death in 1676.
