= Richard Jones (Ruthin priest) =

Richard Jones (c. 1757 – 1814) was a Welsh Anglican priest and writer.

Jones was born in about 1757 (his obituary recording that he died on 23 April 1814 at the age of 57). He was ordained as an Anglican priest in 1783, when it was recorded that he had obtained a BA degree from Jesus College, Oxford. He became the curate of Ruthin and may also have taught at Ruthin School, as he was noted as being "critically versed" in Hebrew, Greek and Latin, and it was not uncommon for curates of the parish to teach at the school. In 1806, he was appointed rector of Llanychan, but appears to have continued his connection with Ruthin. His writings included commentaries on each of the four Gospels (published between 1801 and 1807) as well as religious works in Welsh.
