= William Aubrey (engineer) =

Welsh engineer (1759–1827)

William Aubrey (1759–1827) was a Welsh engineer who designed and built steam-powered machines, including his work as superintendent at the Tredegar iron works and 40-year employment by Samuel Homfray. At the Aberdare Ironworks and Penydarren Ironworks, he was a consulting engineer.

He worked on development of the Cyfarthfa works, the Europe's largest water system of its kind, with Watkin George. He died 22 July 1827.
