= Frances Williams (convict) =

Welsh convict and Australian settler (c. 1760 – 1801)

- Born: c. 1760; Flintshire, Wales
- Died: 1801 (aged around 41); Norfolk Island
- Partners: Robert Ryan (1787–1801); John Cropper (c. 1791–1801); Noah Mortimer (c. 1791–1801)
- Children: 4

Frances Williams (c. 1760–1801) was a Welsh convict who was an early settler of Australia and Norfolk Island. She is considered to be the first Welsh woman to settle in Australia.

== Biography ==
Frances Williams was born in Flintshire, Wales around 1760. Little is known of her early life, except that she lived in the village of Whitford and was employed at the Holywell estate of the artist Moses Griffith. She left Griffith's service by the summer of 1783 and moved to Liverpool with her brother. According to the Dictionary of Welsh Biography, "several reasons have been suggested for this move, ranging from a need to find work in the city to the urge to escape from the clutches of Griffith, who had a reputation for inappropriate behaviour towards women".

On the night of 1 August 1783, Williams broke into Griffith's estate, burglarizing it and stealing clothing. The following morning, the estate's maid found Williams's hat in a neighboring field and reported it to the local magistrate, Thomas Pennant, who also owned the estate property and leased it to Griffith. Pennant's butler apprehended Williams at the port of Parkgate in Cheshire with several items belonging to Griffith. The DWB claims that the items' value totaled two pounds two shillings and one pence, while The Leader claims that their value was one pound seventeen shillings and five pence.

Williams's trial was held on 2 September 1783 at the court of assize in Mold. The trial was overseen by Pennant, who convicted Williams and sentenced her to death by hanging. She was imprisoned in the Flint old gaol. On 24 August 1784, her death sentence was commuted to seven years of penal transportation. According to the DWB, "there is evidence to suggest that Pennant, who had been very prominent in securing the original verdict, felt a particular interest in seeing the back of Frances: the 'precious cargo' among 'the Flint convicts' whom his acquaintance, judge Daines Barrington mentioned in a letter dated 25 January 1786 was no doubt a reference to her". She was transported from Flint to Portsmouth on 26 March 1787, and was loaded on the Prince of Wales – one of several ships of the First Fleet that transported the first convicts to Australia – on 12 April. The fleet set sail on 13 May 1787 and arrived at Port Jackson in Australia in January 1788. The Leader considers Williams to be the first Welsh woman to settle in Australia.

While on the voyage, Williams began a romantic relationship with Robert Ryan, a Royal Marine from County Armagh. On 16 July 1789, their daughter Sarah Williams was born in Sydney Cove. On 5 March 1790, the family re-settled on Norfolk Island, with Williams and her daughter arriving aboard HMS Sirius. Ryan was discharged from the navy in December 1791 and was granted 60 acres of land on Norfolk Island. Sometime around this period, Williams began romantic relationships with two other men, fellow convicts John Cropper and Noah Mortimer. In November 1794, she and Ryan moved back to Australia aboard HMS Daedalus, with Ryan enlisting in the New South Wales Corps. They returned to Norfolk Island aboard HMS Supply in April 1796.

Williams had three more children between 1791 and 1796, a daughter whose father is unclear, a daughter by Cropper and a son by Ryan. When Ryan again left for Australia in 1799, Williams remained on Norfolk Island, where she died in 1801. Her daughter Sarah died the following year, and her remaining children were fostered by Cropper and Mortimer when Ryan left the island permanently in 1804.
