= Simon Lloyd (priest, born 1756) =

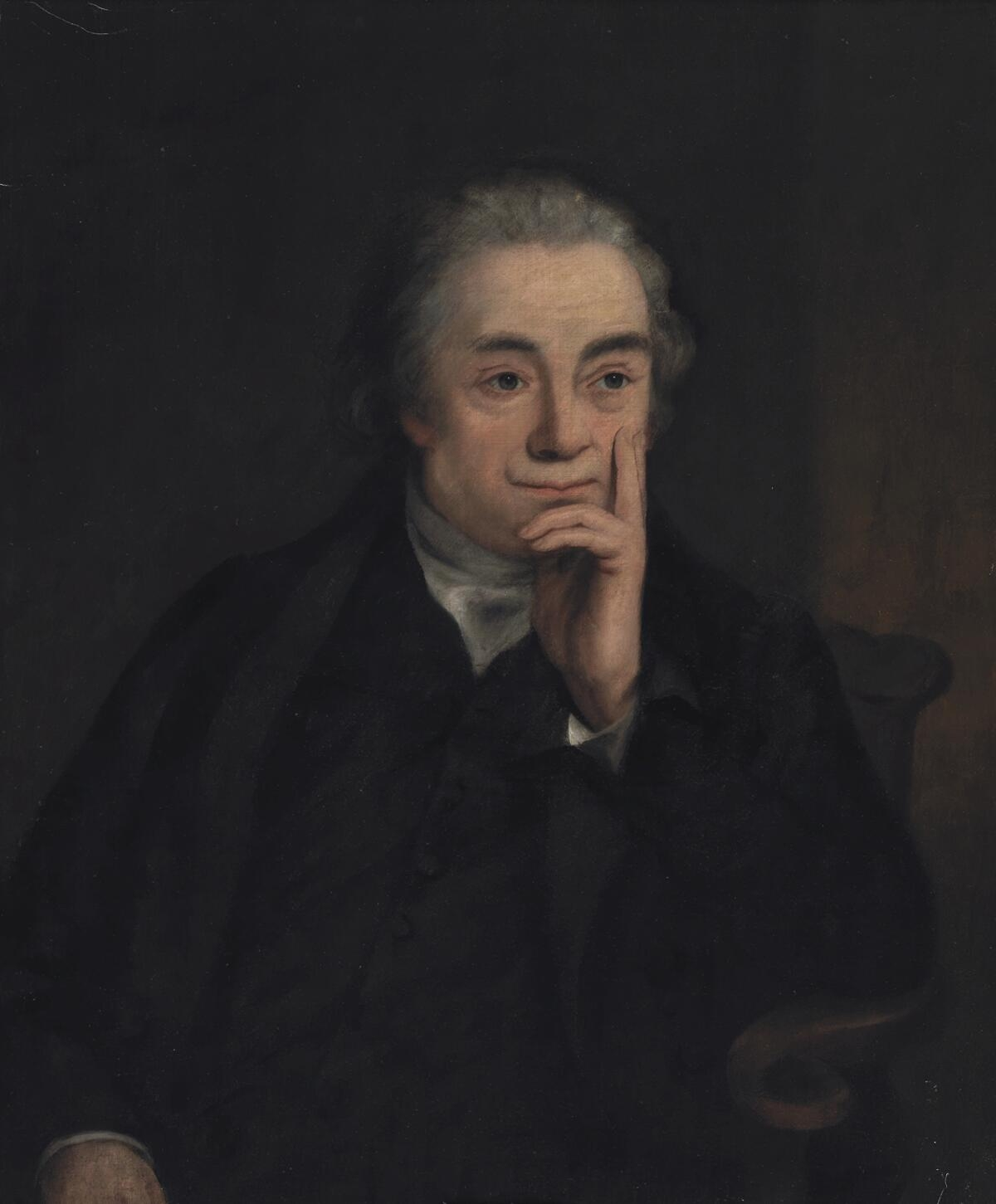
Simon Lloyd c.1810

Simon Lloyd (1756 – 6 November 1836) was a Welsh Anglican priest who became a Methodist preacher.

== Life ==
Lloyd was born in 1756 and educated at Queen Elizabeth's School, Carmarthen and Jesus College, Oxford, where he obtained a Bachelor of Arts degree in 1779. After his ordination, he was a curate in various parishes in Denbighshire: Olveston, Bryneglwys and Llandegla, although he was relieved of his position in Bryneglwys because of his close association with Methodists, especially his friend Thomas Charles. He was later the curate of Llanycil, until 1800, but the bishop refused to approve his appointment to Llanuwchllyn because of his Methodist associations. Charles died in 1814 and Lloyd then edited Y Drysorfa, a Welsh magazine. He also wrote a chronology of the Bible (1817) and a commentary on the Book of Revelation (1828), and had a reputation as a good scholar on biblical matters. He died in Bala on 6 November 1836 and was buried in Llanycil.
