= Sidney Griffith =

Sidney Griffith (née Wynne; died 1752), known in her time as "Madam" Griffith, was an important figure in the Welsh Methodist revival of the mid-18th century.

She was the daughter of Cadwaladr Wynne of Voelas, Denbighshire, and was named Sidney after her grandmother, a member of the prominent Thelwall family. Her mother Jane was the daughter of Edward Griffith of Garn. In about 1741, Sidney married William Griffith of Cefn Amwlch, who ill-treated her. Their son was born in 1742.

In 1746, Sidney Griffith heard a sermon by a Methodist preacher, Peter Williams, and began to follow Methodist teachings. In 1748 she came into contact with the charismatic Methodist leader Howell Harris, and later with his colleague Daniel Rowland. After a quarrel with her husband over money, she sought refuge with the Methodist "family" at Trefeca, but her close friendship with Harris made her unpopular with some of his followers and particularly with his fellow Methodist leader George Whitefield. It was a contributory factor in Harris's falling-out with Rowland.

For a short time, Madam Griffith was Harris's constant companion. Harris said she had been "given me as an eye". Although she had made considerable financial contributions to the Methodist cause, she was left without any income following her separation from her husband. Soon her health deteriorated, and Harris took her to London, where she died (her husband having died three months earlier).
