= Samuel Squire =

British historian and bishop (1714–1766)

- Born: 1714; Warminster, Wiltshire
- Died: 4 November 1764 (aged 49–50); Harley Street, Westminster
- Education: Lord Weymouth's Grammar School, St John's College, Cambridge (1730)
- Occupations: Bishop, Pamphleteer and historian

Samuel Squire (1714 – 7 May 1766) was a Bishop of the Church of England and a historian.

== Early life ==
Squire was the son of a druggist in Warminster, Wiltshire, and was first educated at Lord Weymouth's Grammar School. He matriculated at St John's College, Cambridge in 1730 and graduated BA in 1734, winning the Craven scholarship the same year. He was elected a fellow of St John's in 1735, proceeded MA in 1737, and was made a Doctor of Divinity in 1749.

== Ecclesiastical career ==
Squire began his church career in 1739 when he was ordained a deacon of the Church of England; he was ordained priest in 1741, in which year he was appointed vicar of Minting, Lincolnshire. In 1743 was made a canon of Wells Cathedral, and Archdeacon of Bath, holding both preferments until 1761. Adding to his growing number of parish livings, he was appointed rector of Toppesfield, Essex (1749–50) and subsequently of St Anne's Church, Soho (1750–66), and vicar of St Alphege's, Greenwich (1751–66), where William Paley, who later achieved fame as a theologian and philosopher, served as his curate. He was briefly Dean of Bristol (1760) and was finally appointed Bishop of St David's in 1761. His attainment of offices was due to his open attachment to the court Whigs; he was chaplain to the Duke of Newcastle, whose use of patronage for the court Whig interest was renowned.

== Published works ==
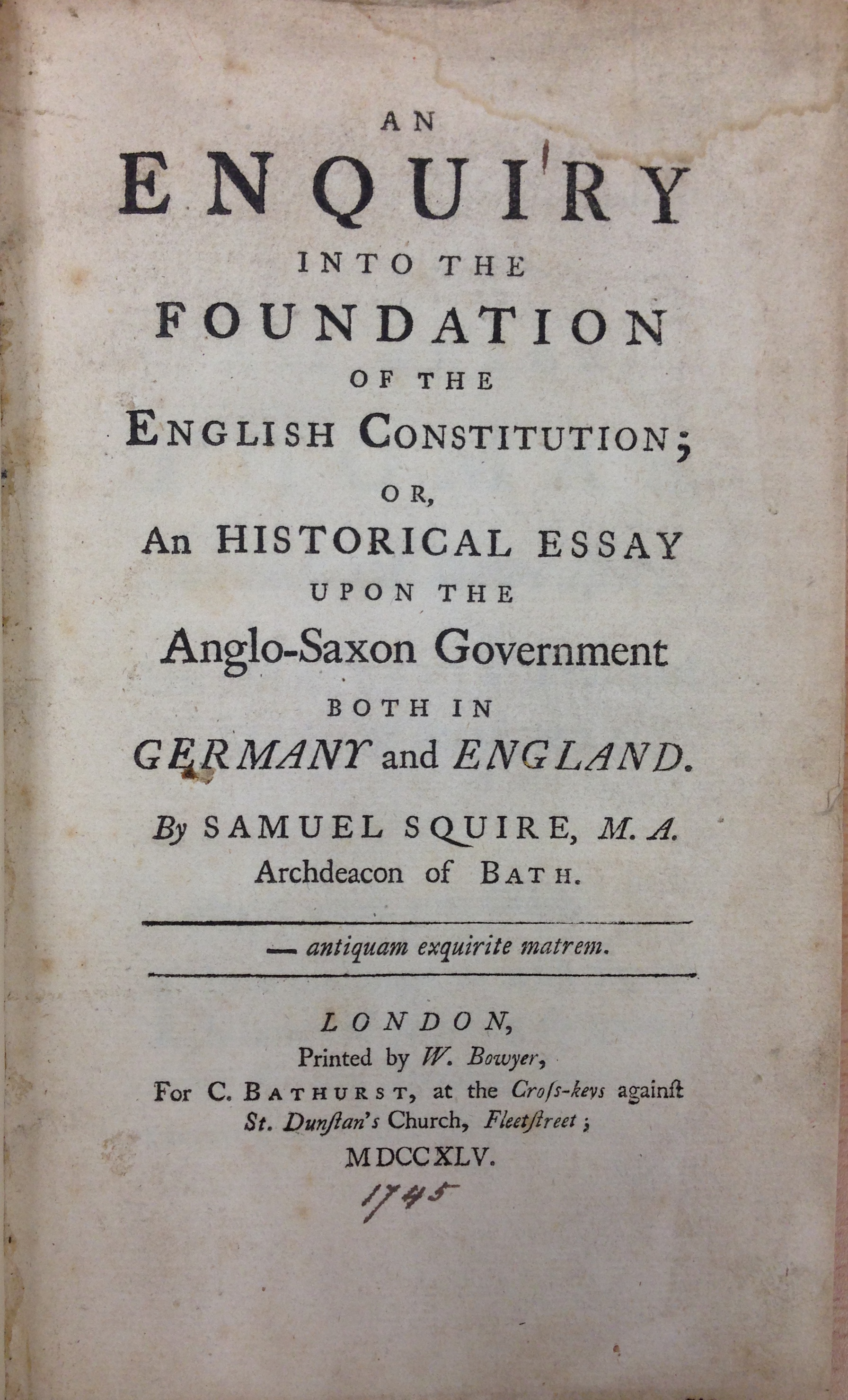
The title page of Squire's An Enquiry into the Foundation of the English Constitution (1745). A new edition was published in 1753. The phrase "antiquam exquirite matrem" means "seek out your ancient Mother", and is a quotation from Virgil's Aeneid (book III, line 96).

In the 1740s Squire published five essays on political subjects in which he voiced his support for the Whig party. His Letter to a Young Gentleman of Distinction (1740) argued for the benefits of a standing army against a militia to protect Britain in its wars against France and Spain. Squire advocated Britain's continental commitment of troops in The Important Question Discussed (1746). He came to the aid of Henry Pelham's administration by trumpeting its Whig principles in A Letter to a Tory Friend (1746). Squire also disputed the arguments of the Jacobite historian Thomas Carte by publishing two pamphlets in 1748: Remarks upon Mr. Carte's Specimen and A Letter to John Trot-Plaid. In the Remarks, Squire used natural law theory to contend against Carte's support of the House of Stuart, and in A Letter he satirised Carte by mocking his interpretation of the past in terms of the present.

Squire also published two works on English history, An Enquiry into the Foundation of the English Constitution (1745) and Historical Essay upon the Balance of Civil Power in England (1748). In An Enquiry, Squire wrote on the German and Anglo-Saxon love of liberty and constitutionalism. In his Historical Essay, Squire wrote that liberty depended upon an equipoise among competing institutions and groups in society, suggesting that whenever such an equipoise collapses an arbitrary government takes its place. The Glorious Revolution of 1688 had ended the struggle to secure a balance and thus ensure liberty.

In May 1746 Squire was elected a Fellow of the Royal Society as: "A Gentleman well known to the Learned World by Several valuable Treatises, perticularly [sic] 'Two Essays on the Antient Greek Chronology' and 'On the Origin of the Greek Language'; A new Edition of Plutarch's Discourse on 'Isis & Osiris', with an English Translation & Commentary; and an 'Historical Essay on the Anglo-Saxon Government both in Germany & England'".

He died in Harley Street, Westminster.

== Notes ==
Church of England titles
Preceded by Anthony Ellis	Bishop of St David's; 1761–1766	Succeeded by Robert Lowth
