= William Wogan (religious writer) =

Irish religious writer

William Wogan (1678 – 24 January 1758) was an Irish religious writer, close to a number of leading evangelicals of his time, and sympathetic with early Methodism.

== Life ==
Possibly born in Ireland, he was the son of Ethelred Wogan, the rector of Gumfreston in Pembrokeshire, Wales and vicar of Penally. He was educated at Swansea Grammar School, Westminster School from 1694 (where he became school captain), and Trinity College, Cambridge which he entered in 1700. Without graduating, he became tutor in the family of Sir Robert Southwell; who died in 1702, leaving the family headed by Edward Southwell his son, who was Secretary of State for Ireland from 27 June 1702.

In 1710 Wogan went to Ireland, as clerk to Edward Southwell who was acting as secretary to James Butler, 2nd Duke of Ormonde, the Lord Lieutenant of Ireland. In 1712 he joined the British Army as a lieutenant, where he became a paymaster stationed in Dublin.

From about 1727, Wogan lived at Ealing in Middlesex, but died at his daughter's house at Stonham Aspal, and was buried at Ealing on 29 January.

Wogan was known for his piety, and was on intimate terms with many of the evangelical leaders of the time such as George Whitefield and John Wesley. Hiscorrespondence with Sir Robert Southwell was purchased by the British Museum, in 1908, as part of the dispersal of the manuscript collection of Sir Thomas Phillipps.

== Works ==
In retirement at Ealing, Wogan wrote religious books, including his major work Essay on the Proper Lessons of the Church of England. It was first published anonymously in 1753 (London, 4 vols.); the second edition of 1764, published after his death, had his name attached. It was also published in Dublin in 1768, and an edition described as the third was brought out in 1818 (London), with a memoir of the author by James Gatliff. At least four other editions were subsequently published. He wrote also:

- A Penitential Office, London, 1721.
- The Right Use of Lent, or Help to Penitents, London, 1732.
- Character of the Times delineated, London, 1735,
- Scripture Doctrine of Predestination, Election, and Reprobation; new ed. Carmarthen 1824; in Welsh 1808 and 1810.

== Family ==
In 1718 Wogan married Catherine Stanhope (a friend and protegee of Lady Elizabeth Hastings), and by her (who died on 19 June 1726) he had an only daughter Catherine, who was married to Robert Baynes, rector of Stonham Aspal, Suffolk. After her mother died when she was only 7, daughter Catherine was cared for by Lady Elizabeth Hastings at Ledston.
