= Brecknockshire Agricultural Society =

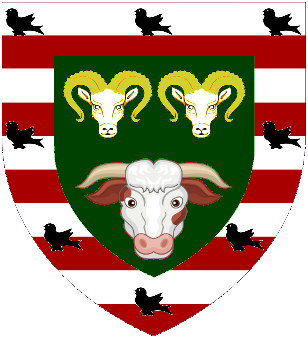
Shield of arms granted in 1955: Vert in chief two rams' heads and in base a Hereford Bull's head all caboshed Proper within a bordure harry of ten Argent and Gules charged with eight martlets Sable.

Brecknockshire Agricultural Society is a Welsh Agricultural Society, established in 1755 in Brecknockshire. Celebrating its 250th anniversary in 2005, it is the oldest continuous such society in Great Britain.

== Establishment ==
The Society was established in March 1755, with the object and purpose of "encouraging agriculture and local manufactures, and the promotion of the general good of the county." The first subscribing members to the Society were: Sir Edward Williams, of Gwernyfed; John Hughes; Hugh Penry; Charles David; John Phillips; William Morgan, clerk; Thomas Williams, clerk (then headmaster of Christ College); Marmaduke Gwynne; Edward Jeffreys; James Parry; Charles Lloyd; John Williams, clerk; Penry Williams, of Penpont Manor House; and Thomas Price Additional early members of the Society included Peregrine Thomas Bertie, Duke of Ancaster; Dr. Tucker, Dean of Gloucester; Valentine Morris, of Piercefield; Thomas Bathurst, of Lydney; Dr. Linden; Sir Charles Hanbury Williams; Sir Charles Morgan; Viscount Hereford, of Tregoyd; several Earl Camdens; the late Lord Tredegar; Robert Thompson Crawshay of Cyfarthfa Castle; the Duke of Beaufort, the Right Hon. Lord Tredegar, Sir J. R. Bailey, Bart., M.P. (lord lieutenant of the county), Sir Charles Alexander Wood, and Mr. James Price William Gwynne-Holford.

The landowners and farmers met to discuss questions relevant to the times. The Society in its early days offered premiums for cloth manufactured in the county, but the competition was not successful, and led to no adequate result. The Society in its early days offered premiums for turnips, but there were people in those days that could not see the use of growing turnips, for it was observed "that it was only after experiencing difficulties and encountering prejudices suggested by that dislike and hatred of innovation which characterizes the country [that's rather a reflection on our forefathers], they ultimately succeeded in introducing this valuable vegetable into general use in this part of the principality."

The earliest transcribed rules of the Society stated that it was more of a "county club," as every subscriber must pay "for his ordinary each meeting one shilling, and for his extraordinary a like sum." The members met more frequently than annually, for the second meeting was held on 16 April 1755, or a few weeks only after its formal establishment. The Society imbibed another old custom: a man was called upon to pay for his dinner whether he was present to eat it or not. The Society's meetings, besides being of a practical turn, evidently finished up with good fellowship and conviviality, as dinner was set on the table at "two o'clock," and the "Society was to break up at ten".

== Awards ==
In 1810, the "Brecknockshire Society for the Encouragement of Agriculture" offered 39 premiums, amounting in money value to £179, and two gold medals, one value ten guineas and the other five guineas. Prizes were offered for the reclamation and fallowing of common land for wheat, and to the farm labourers and boys who drilled and hoed the greatest number of acres of turnips.

== Bibliography ==
- Midmore, Peter; Moore-Colyer, Richard J. (30 August 2006). Cherished Heartland: Future of the Uplands in Wales. Institute of Welsh Affairs. ISBN 978-1-904773-06-1.
- Poole, Edwin (1886). The Illustrated History and Biography of Brecknockshire: From the Earliest Times to the Present Day. Illustrated by Several Engravings and Portraits (Public domain ed.). The author.
