= Edward Cresset =

English bishop (c. 1698–1755)

Edward Cresset (c. 1698 – 1755) was an 18th-century Anglican churchman.

Cresset was born in Glympton, Oxfordshire and educated at Trinity College, Oxford. He was successively Dean of Clogher; Dean of Hereford; and Bishop of Llandaff.

== Notes ==
Religious titles
Preceded by Pascal Ducasse	Dean of Clogher; 1730–1736	Succeeded by John Copping
Preceded by John Harris	Dean of Hereford; 1736–1748	Succeeded by Edmund Castle
Preceded by John Gilbert	Bishop of Llandaff; 1748–1754	Succeeded by Richard Newcome
