= Richard Newcome =

English bishop

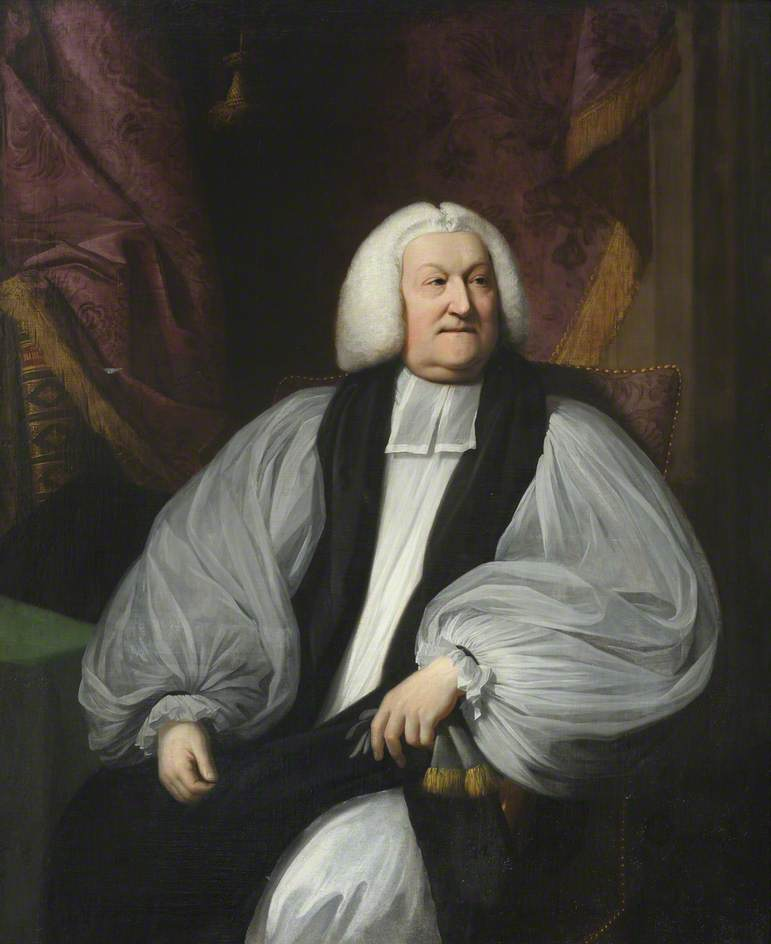
Richard Newcome by Benjamin West.

Richard Newcome (Newcombe) (1701 – 3 June 1769) was an English bishop of Llandaff and bishop of St Asaph.

== Life ==
He was the sixth son of Peter Newcome, vicar of Aldenham, Hertfordshire. He was admitted to Queens' College, Cambridge in 1718, matriculating in 1719, and graduating B.A. 1722, M.A. 1725, and D.D. 1746. He became a Fellow of Queens' and then vicar of Hursley, Hampshire in 1726 .

He was rector of St Botolph's Church, Cambridge, in 1727. Subsequently he was chaplain to George II. From 1746 he was rector of Whitchurch, Shropshire, and from 1755 canon of Windsor. He was bishop of Llandaff from 1755 and was translated to St Asaph in 1761.

He died at Bath, Somerset on 3 June 1769.

Church of England titles
Preceded by Edward Cresset	Bishop of Llandaff; 1755–1761	Succeeded by John Ewer
Preceded by Robert Hay Drummond	Bishop of St Asaph; 1761–1769	Succeeded by Jonathan Shipley
