= Anthony Ellys =

English bishop (1690–1761)

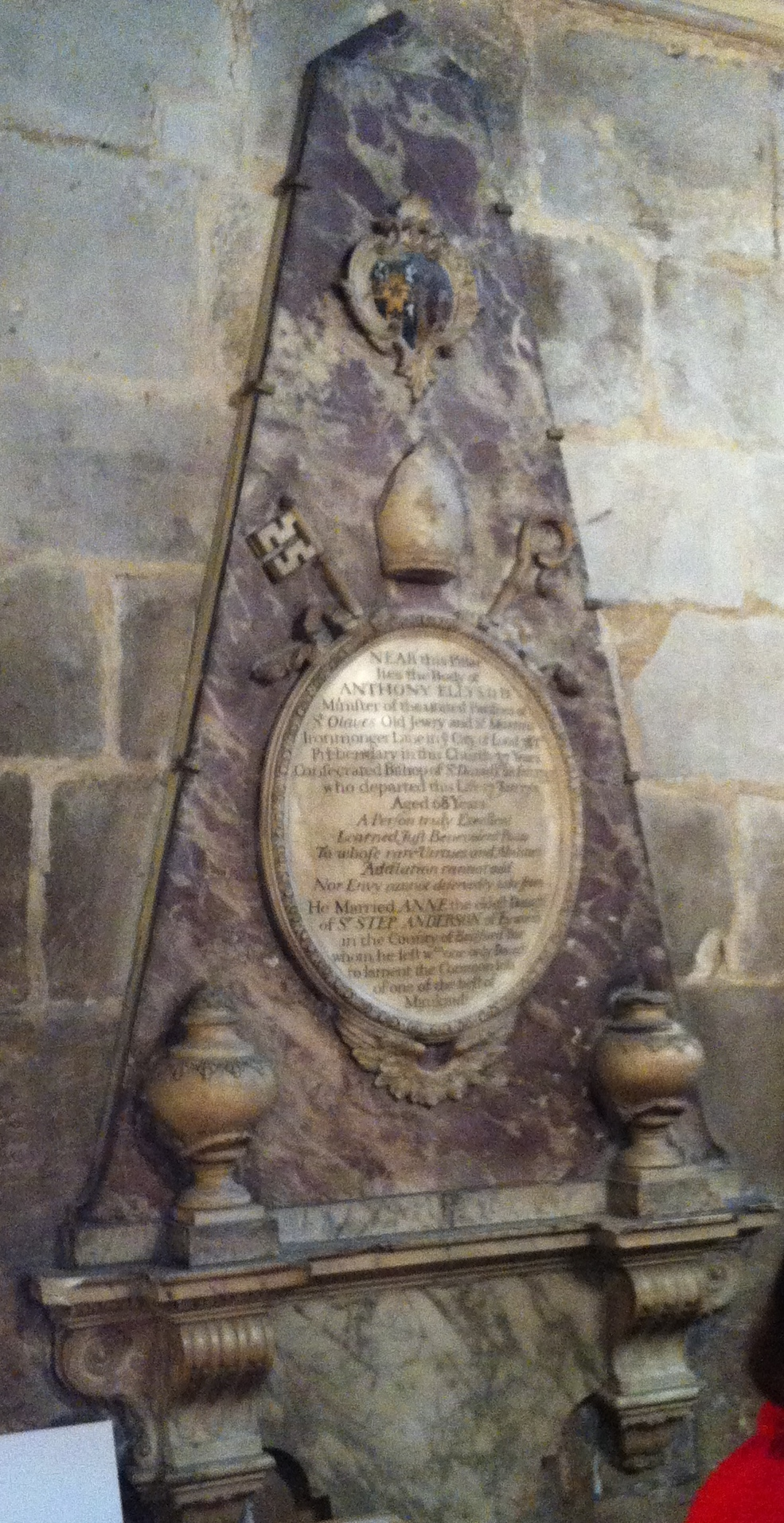
Memorial to Anthony Ellys in Gloucester Cathedral

Anthony Ellys (1690–1761) was an English churchman who became bishop of St David's in 1752.

== Life ==
Born at Yarmouth in Norfolk, he was baptised on 8 June 1690. His father and grandfather were merchants there, and mayors of the borough. He was educated at Clare Hall, Cambridge, where he graduated B.A. in 1712, M.A. in 1716, and D.D. in 1728, on the occasion of a royal visit to the university. He became a fellow of his college and took holy orders. In 1719, his father being mayor, the Yarmouth corporation appointed him minister of St George's Chapel in the own.

He became in 1721 a chaplain to Lord-chancellor Thomas Parker, 1st Earl of Macclesfield, in 1724 vicar of St Olave, Jewry, and prebendary of Gloucester, and in 1729 vicar of Great Marlow also, without surrendering earlier preferments. In 1723 he was elected a Fellow of the Royal Society. In October 1752 he was appointed bishop of St. David's, and consecrated on 28 January in the following year. Ellys continued to hold his prebend and his city living in commendam, and went every Sunday morning in winter from his house in Queen Square to preach to his parishioners. He died at Gloucester on 16 January 1761, and was buried in the south aisle of Gloucester Cathedral.

== Views ==
Ellys was a moderate Whig. There was some objection to the nomination of an upholder of the Test Act as bishop; But Archbishop Thomas Herring, supported Ellys's preferment, a safe pair of hands and attached to the ecclesiastical establishment.

Ellys gave little support to the scheme of John Jones of Welwyn for establishing a seminary for clerical education in his diocese. The books offered by Jones to the bishop were transferred to the presbyterian academy at Carmarthen.

== Works ==
In 1736 he published 'A Plea for the Sacramental Test as best Security for the Church established, and very conducive to the Welfare of the State.' In 1752 he published anonymously some 'Remarks on Mr. Hume's Essay concerning Miracles,' which, though 'written in a sensible and genteel manner,' 'did not excite the attention they deserved.'

His appointment as bishop was by some attributed to reputation which he had gained as being engaged on a major work in defence of the Protestant Reformation; his 'Defence of the Reformation' never appeared. He published nothing more in his lifetime but a few sermons, preached on special occasions before the Lords, the Commons, and the Society for the Propagation of the Gospel. After his death his friends published his Tracts on the Liberty spiritual and temporal of the Protestants of England, which was either a fragment or the whole of the long-expected great work. The first part, which appeared in 1763, was largely an anti-Catholic polemic; the second part, issued in 1765, was a treatise on constitutional liberty based around the Glorious Revolution.

== Family ==
He married Anne, eldest daughter of Sir Stephen Anderson of Eyworth, Bedfordshire, and left one daughter, who married unhappily and became insane.

== Notes ==
Church of England titles
Preceded by Richard Trevor	Bishop of St David's; 1752–1761	Succeeded by Samuel Squire
