= Robert Hay Drummond =

Archbishop of York from 1761 to 1776

The Most Reverend and Right Honourable Robert Hay Drummond
- Archbishop of York
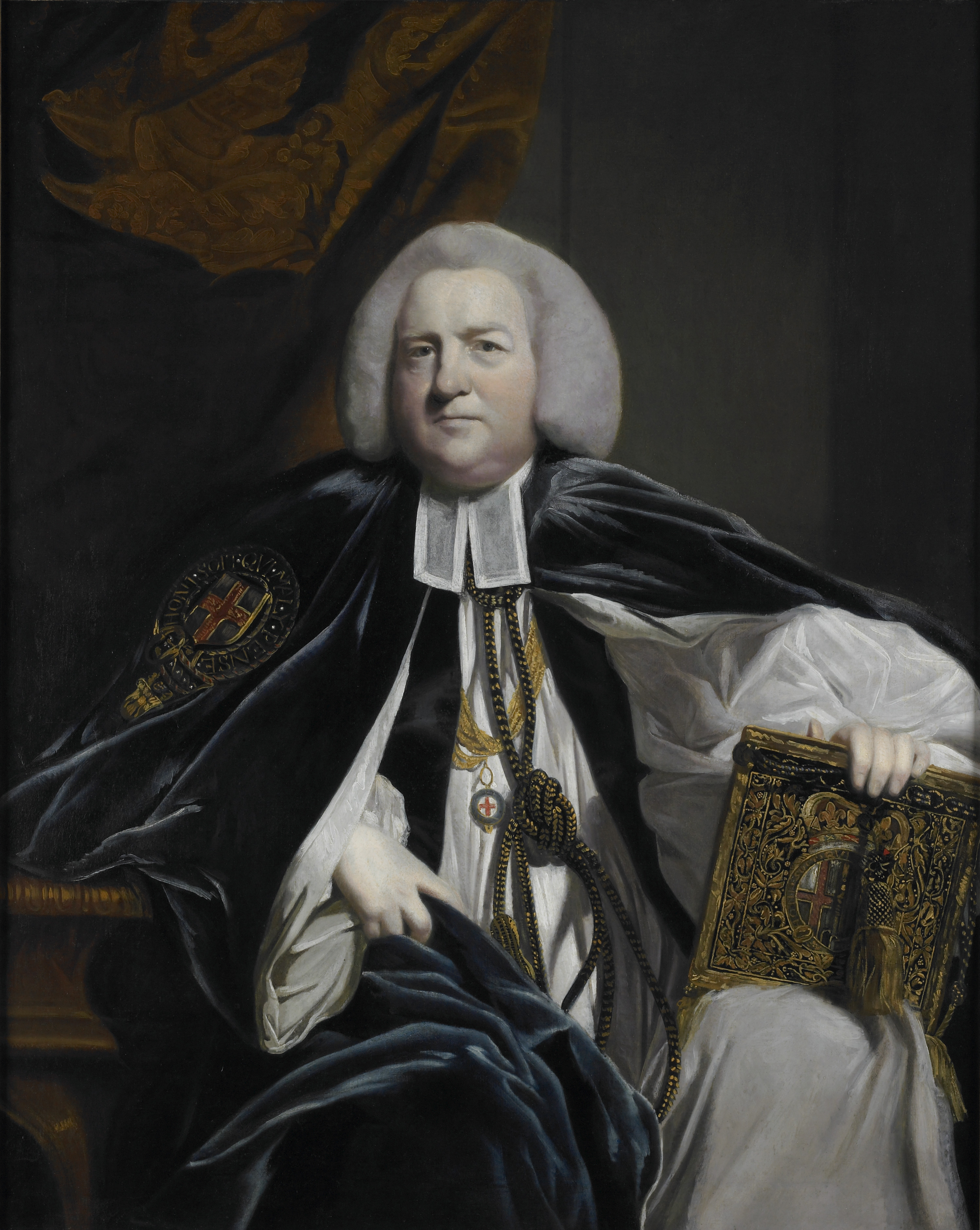
- Portrait by Joshua Reynolds, 1764
- Province: Province of York
- Diocese: Diocese of York
- Elected: 3 October 1761 (elected); 23 October 1761 (confirmed)
- Term ended: 1776 (death)
- Predecessor: John Gilbert
- Successor: William Markham
- Other posts: Bishop of St Asaph (1748–1761); Bishop of Salisbury (11 June – 23 October 1761); Lord High Almoner (1761–?)

Personal details
- Born: Robert Hay; 10 November 1711 London, England
- Died: 10 December 1776 (aged 65) Bishopthorpe, Yorkshire (West Riding), Great Britain
- Buried: 10 December 1776, St Andrew's Church (the second), Bishopthorpe
- Denomination: Anglican
- Residence: Brodsworth Hall, Yorkshire (West Riding; private)
- Parents: George Hay, 8th Earl of Kinnoull & Abigail Countess of Kinnoull (née Harley)
- Spouse: Henrietta Auriol (m. 1749) {she died})
- Children: 3 daughters & 6 sons: Robert Hay-Drummond, 10th Earl of Kinnoull; Edward Hay-Drummond
- Profession: Bishop
- Education: Westminster School; Christ Church, Oxford

Ordination history of Robert Hay Drummond
History
Diaconal ordination
- Ordained by: John Potter, Bishop of Oxford
- Date: 26 June 1736
Priestly ordination
- Ordained by: Potter
- Date: 27 June 1736
Episcopal consecration
- Date: 24 April 1748
- Place: "Kensington Church"

Robert Hay (10 November 1711 – 10 December 1776), known later as Robert Hay-Drummond of Cromlix and Innerpeffray, was successively Bishop of St Asaph, Bishop of Salisbury, and, from 1761 until his death, Archbishop of York.

== Origins and birth ==
Hay was the second son of George Hay, Viscount Dupplin (who succeeded his father as eighth Earl of Kinnoull, in 1719), and Abigail, the youngest daughter of Robert Harley, 1st Earl of Oxford and Earl Mortimer, Lord High Treasurer. He was born in London on 10 November 1711. His birth was mentioned by Jonathan Swift in the Letters to Stella, and his infancy is thus referred to by Richard Bentley in the dedication of his edition of Horace to Lord Oxford, on 8 December 1711: Parvulos duos ex filia nepotes, quorum alter a matre adhuc rubet. ("Two small grandsons from his daughter, of whom one is still red from his mother").

== Education ==
At age 6, he was brought by Matthew Prior to Westminster School, of which Robert Freind was then head-master. There he was admired, "for his talents, and beloved for the pleasantry of his manners, and forming many valuable friendships among his schoolfellows." While still a boy at Westminster he acted in the play Julius Caesar before an audience including George II and Queen Caroline. His continuation of his part even when his plume of ostrich feathers caught fire attracted the notice of the queen, who continued his warm patroness till her death in 1737. From Westminster he moved to Christ Church, Oxford. Having after receiving his BA degree on 25 November 1731, he joined his cousin, Thomas, duke of Leeds, in the Grand Tour. When he came home afterwards in 1735 his uncle not only commented that he was not only 'untainted, but much improved'. He had been originally destined for the army, but on his return to England he went back to Christ Church and took his MA degree 13 June 1735. He then read divinity with a view to his entrance into holy orders.

== Royal favour ==
In the year of his ordination, he was presented by his uncle to the family living of Bothal, Northumberland, and by the influence of Queen Caroline, appointed to a royal chaplaincy at only 25. In 1739, as heir of his great-grandfather, William Drummond, 1st Viscount Strathallan, who had entailed a portion of his Perthshire estates to form a provision for the second son of the Kinnoull family, he assumed the name and arms of Drummond. As royal chaplain, he gained the confidence and esteem of George II, whom he attended during the German campaign of 1743, and on 7 July of that year preached the thanksgiving sermon for the victory of Dettingen before the king at Hanau. On his return to England he entered on a prebendal stall at Westminster, to which he had been appointed by his royal patron in the preceding April. On 9 June 1745, he was admitted BD and DD at Oxford.

== Bishop of St Asaph ==
Drummond was consecrated Bishop of St Asaph in Kensington Church on 24 April 1748. The 13 years spent by him in this see were among the happiest of his life. He was deservedly respected, and he "constantly mentioned the diocese with peculiar affection and delight." He would seem to have dispensed the large patronage of the see with sound judgement. He was not, however, in advance of his age. He made no attempt to popularise the church among the Welsh-speaking population of the diocese, and publicly expressed his hope "that people would see it their best interest to enlarge their views and notions, and to unite with the rest of their fellow-subjects in language as well as in government."

== Archbishop of York ==
In 1761, Drummond was translated to Salisbury where he was ex officio also Chancellor of the Order of the Garter. Here, however, he remained only a few months. He was elected to Salisbury in June; the following August the diocese of York became vacant by the death of Archbishop Gilbert, and Drummond was at once chosen as his successor. "Previous to the coronation," writes Horace Walpole, "the vacant bishoprics were bestowed. York was given to Drummond, a man of parts and of the world," and "a dignified and accomplished prelate." His election took place on 3 October, and his confirmation on 23 October. As a proof of the high esteem in which he was held and of his reputation as a preacher, he was selected while archbishop-designate to preach the sermon at the coronation of George III and Queen Charlotte, on 22 September 1761. This sermon was pronounced by contemporary critics as "sensible and spirited" and "free from fulsome panegyrick." The style is dignified and the language well chosen, and the relative duties of monarch and subjects are set forth without flattery and without compromise.

== Political influence ==
Drummond now became Lord High Almoner to the young king. He is stated to have reformed many abuses connected with the office, and to have put a stop to the system by which persons of rank and wealth had been accustomed to make use of the royal bounty to secure a provision for persons having private claims upon them. During the life of George II, Drummond, who was a whig and an adherent of the Duke of Newcastle, exercised considerable political power, and was an influential speaker in the House of Lords. As Archbishop of York he was sworn of the privy council ex officio on 7 November 1761. In 1753, when a charge was laid before the privy council against James Johnson, Bishop of Gloucester, together with Andrew Stone and William Murray, afterwards Lord Mansfield, of having drunk the Pretender's health, he defended his old schoolfellows with so much earnestness and eloquence that he secured their acquittal, and the proposed inquiry was negatived in the House of Lords by a large majority, George II remarking that "he was indeed a man to make a friend of."

== Retirement and family life ==
The change of policy which speedily followed the accession of George III, when indignities were heaped upon the leading members of the old Whig party, aroused the indignation and disgust of the archbishop. Except when his duty as a churchman called for it, he ceased his attendance at the House of Lords, and retiring to his own private mansion of Brodsworth Hall in Yorkshire, of which we are told he 'made an elegant retreat,' he devoted himself to the vigorous oversight of his diocese and the education of his children, which he personally superintended. In 1749, he married Henrietta, daughter of Peter Auriol, a merchant of London, by whom he had a daughter followed by six sons. He instructed his children himself. History, of which he had an extensive and accurate knowledge, was his favourite subject, and his son gratefully records 'the perspicuous and engaging manner' in which he imparted his instruction, and the lucidity with which he traced the continuity and connection of all history, sacred and profane, 'with the zeal and fervour of honest conviction.' For the use of his children he drew up some clear and comprehensive chronological tables.

== Reputation ==
As a bishop he was certainly quite on a level with the standard of his age. A somewhat extensive collection of his letters existing in manuscript proves him to have been a good, sensible, practical man of business. In his religious views he was strongly opposed to Calvinism, and did not scruple to express freely his dislike of passages in the Articles and Homilies which appeared to favour those tenets. He fully shared in the suspicion which in that age of formality attached to the term "enthusiasm," which he vehemently denounced, while he was equally ardent in defence of what he styled "the decent services and rational doctrines of the church of England." Noble manners, an engaging disposition, affable and condescending address, a genial and good-humoured bearing, even if some allowance is made for partiality in description, make up an attractive portrait. His hospitality was generous, even to excess, and if the gossip of the day is to be credited his own example did not place any severe restraint on the clergy who gathered round his table. On his death Horace Walpole speaks of him as "a sensible, worldly man, but much addicted to his bottle." His son more guardedly records that "wherever he lived hospitality presided; wherever he was present elegance, festivity, and good humour were sure to be found." His very failings were those of a "heart warm even to impetuosity." His open-handed, generous character was manifested in the splendid additions he made to the archiepiscopal palace at Bishopthorpe, where he also erected a new gateway, ornamented the chapel at great cost, and rebuilt the parish church in the taste of the day. It deserves notice that, in an age when the fine arts suffered from prevalent neglect, the archbishop proved himself a liberal patron of English artists.

== Writings ==
Six of the archbishop's sermons which had been printed separately at the time of their delivery were collected by his youngest son, the Revd George Hay Drummond, and published in one volume in 1803, together with a short memoir and A Letter on Theological Study. These sermons display clearness of thought and force of expression, the matter is sensible and to the point, the composition is good, and the language dignified. The Letter on Theological Study was written to a young friend, and not intended for publication. The advice as to the selection of books is very sensible, and free from narrowness, wide reading being recommended, including works not strictly theological.

== Death and posterity ==
In 1766, he lost his eldest daughter at the age of 16, and in 1773, his wife died. He never recovered this last blow, and died at Bishopthorpe on 10 December 1776. By his own desire he was buried under the altar of the parish church, with as little pomp as possible. Of his five sons the eldest, Robert Auriol, succeeded his uncle, Thomas Hay, as 10th earl of Kinnoull, 1787. A portrait by Sir Joshua Reynolds was engraved by Watson. A small medallion portrait is prefixed to his sermons.

== Arms ==
Coat of arms of Robert Hay Drummond

Notes
While Drummond was serving as a bishop his arms would be displayed impaled with those of the diocese and topped by a mitre.
Escutcheon
Quarterly first and fourth Azure a unicorn salient Argent unguled Armed and crined Or within a bordure of the last charged with eight thistles Proper second and third Argent three inescutcheons Gules.

Church of England titles
Preceded by Samuel Lisle	Bishop of St Asaph; 1748–1761	Succeeded by Richard Newcombe
Preceded by John Thomas	Bishop of Salisbury; 1761–1761	Succeeded by John Thomas
Preceded by John Gilbert	Archbishop of York; 1761–1776	Succeeded by William Markham
