= Wilmot Vaughan, 3rd Viscount Lisburne =

Welsh landowner and Irish peer

Wilmot Vaughan, 3rd Viscount Lisburne (died 19 January 1766), styled Hon. Wilmot Vaughan until 1762, was a Welsh landowner and Irish peer. He inherited his titles and the Trawsgoed estate in Cardiganshire from his elder brother in 1741, but the estate was heavily financially encumbered, and he had to spend over a decade defending it from the claims of his brother's estranged wife and her son. His marriage to an heiress in some measure recouped the family fortunes.

== Life ==
Wilmot was the second son of John Vaughan, 1st Viscount Lisburne, and his wife, Lady Malet Wilmot. He appears to have been the Wilmot Vaughan who was commissioned a captain in Grove's Regiment of Foot on 13 April 1723, and transferred to the command of an independent company of invalids in Hull on 9 August 1737.

In 1727, Wilmot married Elizabeth Watson, the sister of Thomas Watson of Berwick-upon-Tweed. They had four children:

- Wilmot Vaughan, 1st Earl of Lisburne (1728–1800)
- Hon. John Vaughan (c.1729–1795)
- Hon. Malet Vaughan (b. c.1730), died young
- Hon. Elizabeth Vaughan (c.1741 – January 1817), married Thomas Lloyd (d. 1783) of Abertrinant and had issue

Wilmot's elder brother John Vaughan, 2nd Viscount Lisburne, lived a dissipated life, kept numerous mistresses, and separated from his wife Dorothy in 1729 when she had an affair with her brother-in-law, his land agent. They lived apart thereafter, and her son Edward, born in 1733, was almost certainly not John's, although baptized with the name of Vaughan. John's final will, made in January 1741, left almost all of his property to Wilmot, who was also made guardian of John's legitimate daughter Malet.

== Trawsgoed ==
John died shortly thereafter, and Wilmot immediately took possession of Trawsgoed. The estate, which yielded about £1000 per year, was mortgaged, and charged with a jointure for Dorothy and provision for Malet. Wilmot was unsuccessful in blocking payment of Dorothy's jointure, but after several years of litigation, Dorothy and Edward settled with him in 1754, just before their claim to the title and estates would have gone to trial. Edward agreed to drop his claims in exchange for an annuity, although he continued to use the name and arms of Vaughan.

== Lord lieutenant ==
After a delay of several years, Wilmot was appointed Lord Lieutenant of Cardiganshire in 1744, in succession to his brother. He worked to manage the Trawsgoed estate more efficiently than his brother, but had not yet cleared it of debt when he died on 19 January 1766. He was succeeded in his titles and estates by his son Wilmot, who had become politically active as early as 1755 and taken over the Lord-Lieutenancy in 1762.

== Citations ==
Honorary titles
| Vacant Title last held by The 2nd Viscount Lisburne | Lord Lieutenant of Cardiganshire; 1744–1762 | Succeeded by Hon. Wilmot Vaughan |
Peerage of Ireland
| Preceded by John Vaughan | Viscount Lisburne; 1741–1766 | Succeeded by Wilmot Vaughan |
