= Viscount Windsor =

Viscountcy in the Peerage of the United Kingdom

Viscount Windsor is a title that has been created twice.

The first creation came in the Peerage of Ireland in 1699 when the Honourable Thomas Windsor was made Viscount Windsor, of Blackcastle. He was the younger son of Thomas Hickman-Windsor, 1st Earl of Plymouth, and notably represented Droitwich, Bramber and Monmouthshire in the House of Commons. In 1712, he was created Baron Mountjoy in the Peerage of Great Britain, giving him a seat in the House of Lords at Westminster, one of Harley's Dozen. Windsor was a descendant of Andrew Windsor, 1st Baron Windsor and the Honourable Elizabeth Blount, sister of Edward Blount, 2nd Baron Mountjoy, hence his choice of title (see also Baron Mountjoy). He was succeeded by his son, the second Viscount. He sat as Member of Parliament for Cardiff. On his death in 1758, the titles became extinct. His daughter and heiress, the Honourable Charlotte Jane Windsor, married John Stuart, 4th Earl of Bute. In 1796, he was created Viscount Mountjoy, Earl of Windsor and Marquess of Bute.

The second creation came in the Peerage of the United Kingdom in 1905 when Robert Windsor-Clive, 14th Baron Windsor, was made Viscount Windsor, of St Fagans in the County of Glamorgan. He was made Earl of Plymouth at the same time. For more information on this creation of the viscountcy, see the latter title.

== Viscounts Windsor (1699, first creation) ==
- Thomas Windsor, 1st Viscount Windsor (1669–1738)
- Herbert Windsor, 2nd Viscount Windsor (1707–1758)

== Viscounts Windsor (1905, second creation) ==
- See Earl of Plymouth

== Title succession chart ==
Title succession chart, Barons Windsor, Viscounts Windsor (both creations) and Earls of Plymouth (second and third creations)

Baron Windsor, 1529
Andrew Windsor; 1st Baron Windsor; 1467–1543
William Windsor; 2nd Baron Windsor; 1498–1558
Edward Windsor; 3rd Baron Windsor; 1532–1574
Frederick Windsor; 4th Baron Windsor; 1559–1585	Henry Windsor; 5th Baron Windsor; 1562–1605
Thomas Windsor; 6th Baron Windsor; 1591–1642	Elizabeth Windsor	Dixie Hickman
Barony Windsor in abeyance
Barony Windsor abeyance terminated, 1660; Earl of Plymouth (2nd creation), 1682
Thomas Hickman-Windsor; 1st Earl of Plymouth; 7th Baron Windsor; 1627–1687
Viscount Windsor (1st creation: Ire), 1699; Baron Mountjoy (3rd creation: GB), 1712
Other Windsor; 1659–1684	Thomas Windsor; 1st Viscount Windsor; 1669–1738	Dixey Windsor; 1672–1743	Andrews Windsor; 1678–1765	William Windsor; 1681/82 – 1682
Other Windsor; 2nd Earl of Plymouth; 1679–1727	Thomas Windsor b. 1706	Herbert Windsor; 2nd Viscount Windsor; 1707–1758
Viscountcy and barony extinct
Other Windsor; 3rd Earl of Plymouth; 1707–1732
Other Lewis Windsor; 4th Earl of Plymouth; 1731–1771
Other Hickman Windsor; 5th Earl of Plymouth; 1751–1799	Thomas Windsor; 1752–1832	Andrew Windsor; 7th Earl of Plymouth; 1764–1837	Henry Windsor; 8th Earl of Plymouth; 1768–1843
Earldom extinct
Barony Windsor abeyance terminated, 1855
Other Archer Windsor; 6th Earl of Plymouth; 12th Baron Windsor; 1789–1833	Harriet Windsor-Clive; 13th Baroness Windsor; 1797–1869	Robert Henry Clive (1789–1854)
Barony Windsor in abeyance
Robert Windsor-Clive; 1824–1859
Earl of Plymouth (3rd creation) and Viscount Windsor (2nd creation: UK), 1905
Robert George Windsor-Clive; 1st Earl of Plymouth; 14th Baron Windsor; 1857–1923
Other Windsor-Clive; Viscount Windsor; 1884–1908	Ivor Miles Windsor-Clive; 2nd Earl of Plymouth; 1889–1943
Other Robert Ivor Windsor-Clive; 3rd Earl of Plymouth; 1923–2018
Ivor Windsor-Clive; 4th Earl of Plymouth b. 1951
Robert Windsor-Clive; Viscount Windsor b. 1981
Edward Windsor-Clive b. 2019

== See also ==
- Baron Windsor
- Duke of Windsor
