= Other Windsor =

Other Windsor may refer to:

- Other Windsor, Lord Windsor (1659–1684), eldest son of Thomas Hickman-Windsor, 1st Earl of Plymouth
- Other Windsor, 2nd Earl of Plymouth (1679–1725), only child of the above Lord Windsor
- Other Windsor, 3rd Earl of Plymouth (1707–1732), only child of Other Windsor, 2nd Earl of Plymouth
- Other Windsor, 4th Earl of Plymouth (1731–1771), only child of the 3rd Earl
- Other Windsor, 5th Earl of Plymouth (1751–1799), eldest son of the 4th Earl
- Other Windsor, 6th Earl of Plymouth (1789–1833), only son of the 5th Earl

== See also ==
- Other Windsor-Clive, 3rd Earl of Plymouth (1923–2018), nephew of Viscount Windsor
