= Other =

Other often refers to:

- Other (philosophy), a concept in psychology and philosophy

Other or The Others may also refer to:

== Film and television ==
- The Other (1913 film), a German silent film directed by Max Mack
- The Other (1930 film), a German film directed by Robert Wiene
- The Other (1947 film), an Italian film directed by Carlo Ludovico Bragaglia
- The Other (1972 film), an American film directed by Robert Mulligan
- The Other (1999 film), a French-Egyptian film directed by Youssef Chahine
- The Other (2007 film), an Argentine-French-German film by Ariel Rotter
- The Other (2025 film), an American film directed by Paul Etheredge
- Other (film), a French/Belgian film directed by David Moreau
- The Other (Doctor Who), a fictional character in Doctor Who
- The Other (Marvel Cinematic Universe), a fictional character in the Marvel Cinematic Universe

== Literature ==
- Other: British and Irish Poetry since 1970, a 1999 poetry anthology
- The Other (Applegate novel), a 2000 Animorphs novel by K.A. Applegate
- The Other (Tryon novel), a 1971 horror novel by Tom Tryon
- "The Other" (short story), a 1972 short story by Jorge Luis Borges
- The Other, a 2008 novel by David Guterson
- Spider-Man: "The Other", a 2005–2006 Marvel Comics crossover story arc

== Music ==
- The Other (band), a German horror punk band
- Other (Alison Moyet album) or the title song, 2017
- Other (Lustmord album), 2008
- The Other (The Other album), 1997
- The Other (King Tuff album), or the title song, 2018
- "The Other", a song by Lauv from I Met You When I Was 18 (The Playlist), 2018
- "The Other", a song by Tonight Alive from Underworld, 2018

== People ==
- Othoere, or Other, a contemporary of Alfred the Great
- Other, father of Walter Fitz Other, castellan of Windsor in the time of William the Conqueror
- Other Windsor (disambiguation), several people
- Other Windsor-Clive, 3rd Earl of Plymouth (1923–2018)
- Other C. Wamsley, a builder in Hamilton, Montana

== Other uses ==
- Other Music, a defunct music store in New York City
- OtherOS, a feature available in early versions of the PlayStation 3 console

== See also ==
- Another (disambiguation)
- Others (disambiguation)
- Otherness (disambiguation)
