= Hewell Grange =

Grade I listed house in Worcestershire, United Kingdom

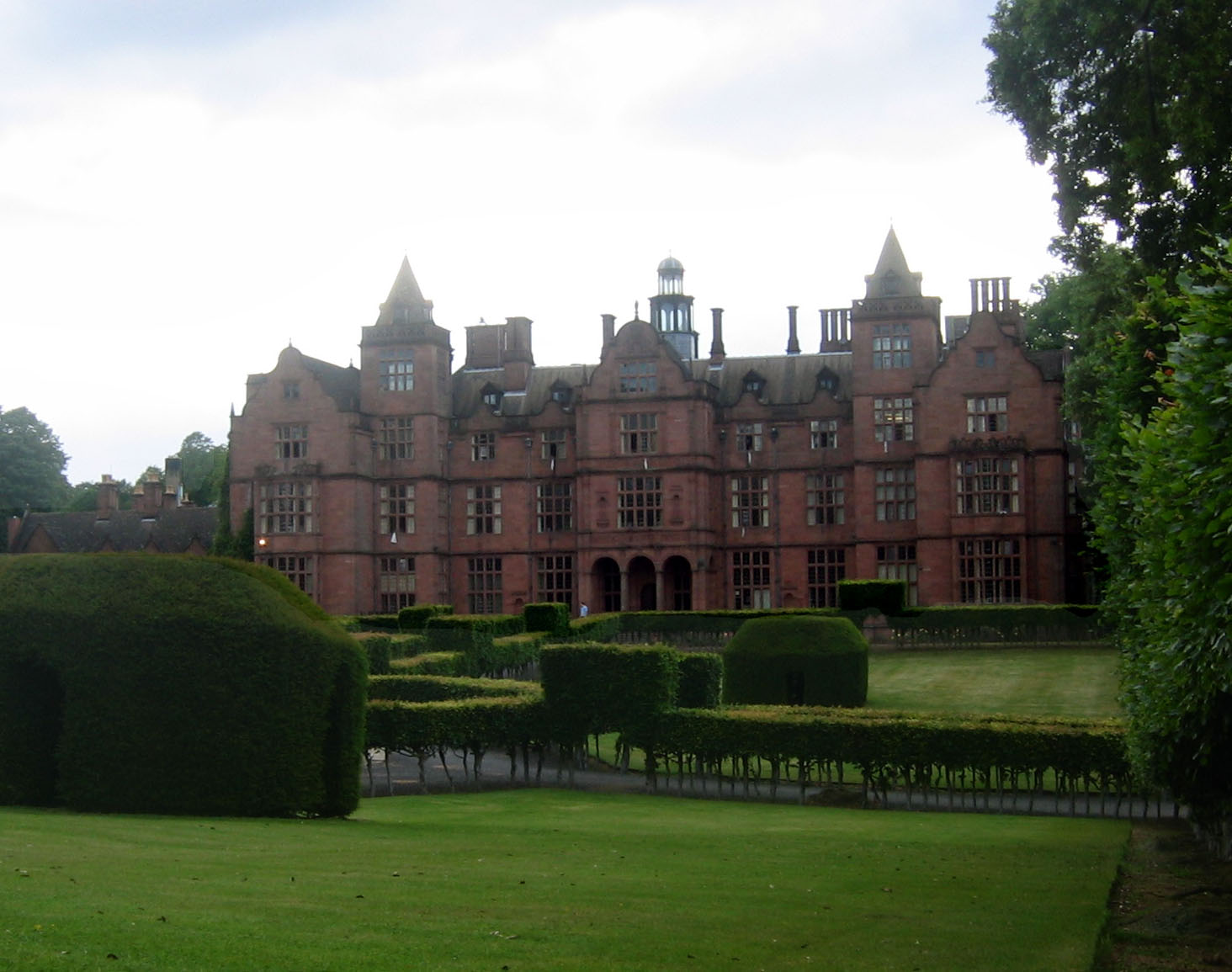
- "the last Victorian prodigy house"

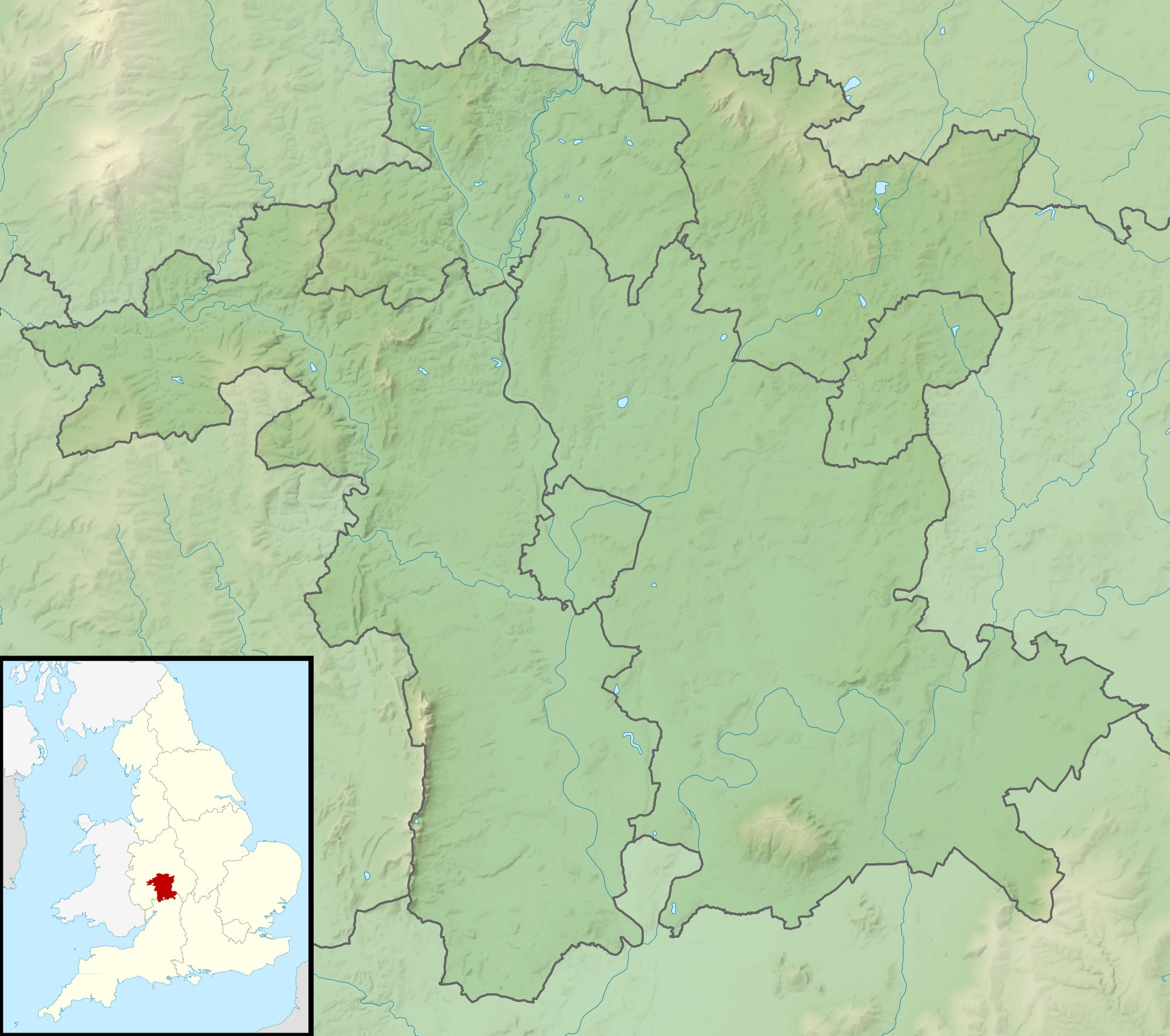
- Location within Worcestershire
- 52.3192°N 1.9916°W
- Type: House
- Location: Tardebigge, Worcestershire

History
- Built: 1884–1891

Site notes
- Architect(s): George Frederick Bodley & Thomas Garner
- Architectural style: Jacobethan
- Owner: Robert Windsor-Clive, 1st Earl of Plymouth

Listed Building – Grade I
- Official name: Hewell Grange
- Designated: 16 July 1986
- Reference no.: 1100160

Listed Building – Grade II
- Official name: Statue in forecourt to north of Hewell Grange
- Designated: 16 July 1986
- Reference no.: 1100162

Listed Building – Grade II
- Official name: Statue in north quadrant of French Garden, Hewell Grange
- Designated: 16 July 1986
- Reference no.: 1100164

Listed Building – Grade II
- Official name: Statue in south quadrant of French Garden, Hewell Grange
- Designated: 16 July 1986
- Reference no.: 1385583

National Register of Historic Parks and Gardens
- Official name: Hewell Grange Park and Garden
- Designated: 28 February 1986
- Reference no.: 1000886

Hewell Grange is a former country house in Tardebigge, Worcestershire, England. "One of the most important late 19th century country houses in England", the mansion was built between 1884 and 1891 by George Frederick Bodley and Thomas Garner for Robert Windsor-Clive, later first Earl of Plymouth. Constructed in the Jacobethan style, it was "perhaps the last Victorian prodigy house". After the Second World War, the third earl sold the Hewell estate to the Crown and it was redeveloped as a prison. The mansion was used to house young offenders, and later low-risk prisoners, while adult prisons were built in the grounds. The site was subsequently consolidated as HM Prison Hewell. In 2019, the Ministry of Justice announced the closure of the Category D open prison housed in Hewell Grange, after a highly critical report by Her Majesty's Inspectorate of Prisons.

The Windsor-Clive family descended from Walter FitzOther, Constable of Windsor Castle during the reign of William the Conqueror. They came to Tardebigge in the 16th century and over the next two centuries expanded their land holdings in Worcestershire, Shropshire and South Wales. The development of the South Wales Coalfield in the 18th and 19th centuries saw their wealth greatly increase, as the coal was transported worldwide from their ports at Barry and Penarth. At his coming of age in 1878 Robert Windsor-Clive inherited some 30,500 acres and an income from ground rents and port royalties which allowed him to undertake the building of Hewell Grange at a time when many landed aristocrats were facing retrenchment due to the Agricultural Depression. The Windsor-Clives lived in their new home for less than 50 years before consolidating their estates in Shropshire in the mid-20th century.

Hewell Grange is a Grade I listed building, its structure, interiors and setting having survived remarkably well despite over 70 years of institutional use. The park surrounding the house was landscaped by both Capability Brown and Humphry Repton and is graded II* on the National Register of Historic Parks and Gardens. The lake is a Site of Special Scientific Interest (SSSI). The ruins of an earlier hall stand near to the lake.

== History ==
The Tardebigge estate was originally a grange for Bordesley Abbey and came to the Windsor family in 1542 at the Dissolution of the Monasteries. The Windsors came originally from the south, holding the ancient barony of Windsor. They claimed descent from Walter FitzOther, first Constable of Windsor Castle during the reign of William the Conqueror. (Note: The Windsors' lineage accounts for their use of the unusual first name of "Other". The present, 4th, earl is Ivor Edward Other Windsor-Clive.) The Victoria County History records that Andrew, Lord Windsor, was obliged by Henry VIII to exchange his historic manor at Stanwell, near Windsor, for the Bordesley Abbey estate, and did so “much against his will”. By the 17th century, Thomas Hickman-Windsor had been elevated to the Earldom of Plymouth. His grandson, Other Windsor, 2nd Earl of Plymouth, commissioned a country house at Tardebigge which was built around 1711–1712. It has been attributed to Francis Smith of Warwick or his brother William and was redesigned by Thomas Cundy in 1815–1816. (Note: Queen Victoria, then Princess Victoria, stayed at the old hall in November 1832, and sketched the view from her bedroom window.) The surrounding estate was landscaped, firstly on the advice of William Shenstone, then by Capability Brown and lastly by Humphry Repton.

The 19th century saw the Windsors prosper, partly through marriage, and partly through industrial development. Robert Windsor-Clive, on his coming of age in 1878, inherited 30,500 acres in Worcestershire, Shropshire and South Wales, including three major houses, the old Hewel Grange, St Fagans Castle on his Glamorgan estates, and Oakly Park on his Shropshire lands. The Welsh property was much the most valuable, the opening of the Penarth and Barry Docks for the transportation of coal brought the family immense royalties. Shortly after his marriage Windsor-Clive determined on reconstructing the old grange and engaged George Frederick Bodley and Thomas Garner, of the ecclesiastical firm Bodley & Garner to prepare estimates. These proved to be so high that he instead resolved on building a new house, on a site selected by the landscape architect Edward Milner. The old house was partially demolished, but its ruins remain as an eyecatcher by the lake. (Note: Historic England records that the roof of the old grange was destroyed during a firework display arranged in honour of the Shah of Persia.)

Robert Windsor-Clive married Alberta Victoria Sarah Caroline Paget, always known as Gay, in 1883. Gay was the daughter of Augustus Paget, a diplomat, and his German-born wife, Walburga, diarist, artist and intimate friend of Queen Victoria. Windsor-Clive held a number of, relatively minor, political offices, serving as Paymaster General under Lord Salisbury from 1890 to 1892, and First Commissioner of Works under Arthur Balfour from 1902 to 1905. (Note: During his time as Commissioner of Works, Windsor-Clive was responsible for the redesign of The Mall in London, which saw it transformed into the nation's premier processional route.) He also had an array of local positions, related to his estates, including Mayor of Cardiff, Lord Lieutenant of Glamorganshire and Honorary Colonel of the 2nd Glamorganshire Artillery Volunteers.

Windsor-Clive and his wife pursued a wide range of artistic interests. He was a Trustee of the National Gallery, a long-serving chairman of the National Trust and author of what was the standard work on John Constable. Lady Windsor established an Arts and Crafts workshop at Hewell, decorated some of the rooms in partnership with her mother, and enjoyed a long friendship with Edward Burne-Jones, who painted her portrait, a "masterpiece of symbolist art" which hung on the stairway at Hewell. The Windsor-Clives were members of The Souls, a grouping of intellectual aristocrats, with Gay Windsor-Clive conducting a long, and acknowledged, affair with George Wyndham, the group's most prominent member. The Souls held relaxed attitudes to extra-marital liaisons. The novelist Elinor Glyn, herself a long-term lover of another Soul, George Curzon, recorded her impressions of their country house weekends; "the good-looking unattached men had a wonderful time...while many husbands were the lovers of their friends' wives".

Windsor-Clive's first encounter with the firm of Bodley & Garner is recorded in his wife's memoir of her husband, privately published in 1932: "Although I first discussed the plans with Mr Bodley in the very small dog kennel of the Athenaeum Club, it was Mr Garner who came to see us to discuss the details and the designs from the very beginning were [his]". The resulting house has been described as "one of the most important late 19th century country houses in England", and is Bodley and Garner's most significant country house. The house was hugely expensive and building was undertaken at a leisurely pace. (Note: Caroline Dakers, in her study of Clouds House, records the cost of building Hewell at £250,000 and the price received by the third earl on its sale in 1947 as £35,000.) The foundations were laid in 1884, and the Windsor-Clives moved in during 1891, when the house was still incomplete. The building was technologically advanced; one of the first in the country to be lit by electricity and with hydraulic lifts powered from the water tower in the park. The Windsor-Clives entertained at Hewell on an appropriate scale, with guests including Lord Salisbury, the Shah of Persia, and many members of the British royal family. Ferdinand de Rothschild, the builder of the even grander Waddesdon Manor and another Soul, suggested that Hewell was the only modern English house he really envied. But the house was obsolete almost as it was being built. Lady Windsor, in her memoir of her husband, wrote "had we any idea how quickly the circumstances of life in this country, and indeed throughout the world, would change, I do not think that we should have dreamt of building a house of that size". Charles Robert Ashbee, an architect and family friend, visiting in 1913 described it as "a noble example of something now I suppose extinct".

The estate remained a seat of the Windsor-Clive family (who were made Earls of Plymouth) until just after World War II. The death of the 2nd Earl, Ivor Windsor-Clive in 1943, saw his son inherit the Windsor estates. Heavy death duties forced him to sell Hewell Grange and the ground rents from his land in Barry, Penarth and Grangetown. St Fagans Castle was donated to the National Museum of Wales. (Note: The castle grounds now house the St Fagans National Museum of History, an open-air museum chronicling the culture, lifestyle and architecture of the Welsh people. The museum comprises over 40 buildings, relocated from all over Wales, which represent different aspects of Welsh history.) The Hewell Grange estate was sold to the state which established a borstal at the house. This operated from 1946 to 1982 and then as a Young Offender Institution until 1991, when it became HM Prison Hewell Grange, a Category D open prison for adults. The prison was closed in 2020, after a number of incidents of violence, and a report by Her Majesty's Inspector of Prisons which condemned the facility as "squalid, demeaning and depressing". Following closure, the grange was sold to Midlands-based hoteliers in March 2023.

Hewell Grange and its gardens have previously, although rarely, been open to the public through the Heritage Open Days and the National Gardens schemes. As at 2020 no public access is permitted, although access to the lake is possible.

== Architecture and description ==
Hewell Grange is constructed to an Elizabethan H-plan and built in the Jacobethan style. Montacute House, Somerset is the main influence, with elements of Charlton Park, Wiltshire and Bramshill in Hampshire. Alan Brooks and Nikolaus Pevsner, in their Worcestershire volume of the Buildings of England series, describe it as "perhaps the last Victorian prodigy house". The house is of Runcorn Red Sandstone, of three storeys, with a central lantern and towers with pyramidal roofs. The entrance front is recessed, with a two-storey porch and a porte-cochère. The chapel in the porch contains carving by Detmar Blow. The garden front is a long, nine-bay, range. The interior is Italianate Quattrocento in style. Bodley had originally planned Jacobean-style decoration, but was over-ruled by Windsor-Clive who insisted on Elizabethan and Renaissance designs. The house is dominated by the massive Great Hall, comprising half the total space of the house. The elaborate decoration is largely "well-preserved". (Note: Michael Hall, in his study of Bodley, George Frederick Bodley and the Later Gothic Revival in Britain and America, concludes his entry on Hewell; "The hall has changed surprisingly little since William Nicholson's portrait of the Windsors in 1908, inhabiting Garner's delicately beautiful interior like the ghosts they have become".)

Entrance to the house is through a vestibule into the Great Hall. This enormous room runs along the whole of the entrance front and is two-storeys high. Colonnades of marble and alabaster terminate each end. Brooks and Pevsner conclude that "other rooms are insignificant compared to the overwhelming display of the hall". The billiard room, dining room and Lord Windsor's study all lie off the hall. Lady Windsor's sitting room is decorated with a painted ceiling copied from the Ducal Palace, Mantua and much of the Italianate decoration drew on sketches made by the Windsors on their Italian tours. A grand staircase gives access to the upper bedroom floors, including Lady Windsor's dressing room, decorated by her mother with murals evoking Beethoven's Pastoral Symphony. Many of the other murals and painted ceilings were undertaken by a pair of Bavarian artists, Behr and Virsching.

Hewell Grange is a Grade I listed building. Its Historic England listing describes it as "an outstanding example of a late-Victorian country house, [with] an interior of remarkable quality, [that] survives substantially intact". Its park and gardens are listed Grade II*. The lake is a Site of Special Scientific Interest (SSSI). The park contains a large number of listed buildings: three lodges, the North and South at the north-west gate, and the Paper Mill Lodge to the south; a range of estate buildings including the water tower, home farm, game larder, ice house and walled garden; three bridges on the lake, one to the north, one to the south and a footbridge giving access to an island; (Note: The footbridge has been attributed to Humphry Repton and was restored in the early 21st century.) a real tennis court, with two adjacent bridges; and various ornamental features, including a temple, gates to the French Garden and five statues. Nikolaus Pevsner's original Worcestershire guide from 1968 records the presence in the garden of an Italian wellhead brought back by the Windsors from the Palazzo Marcello in Venice but it is no longer in situ.

== Gallery ==
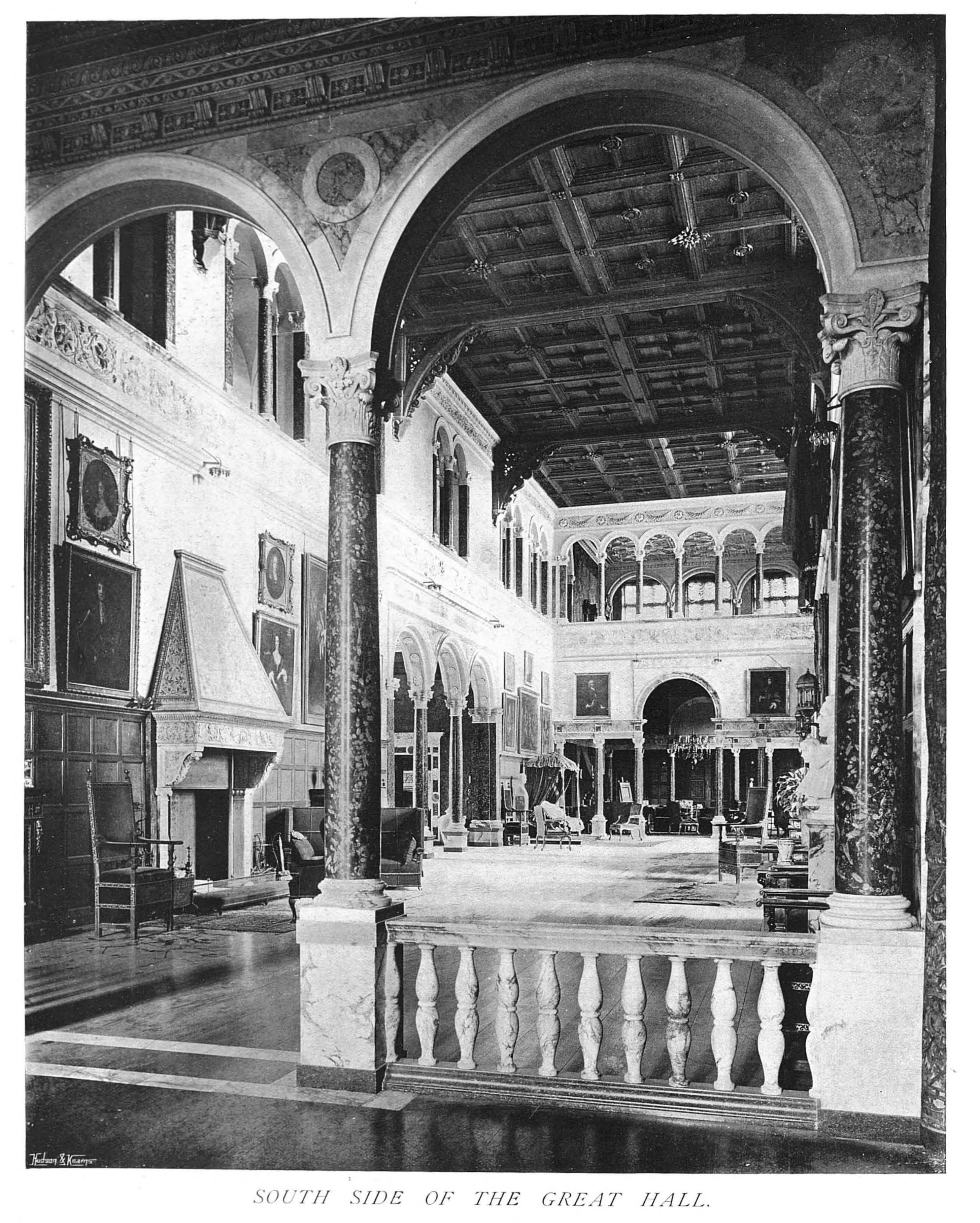
The Great Hall – south side

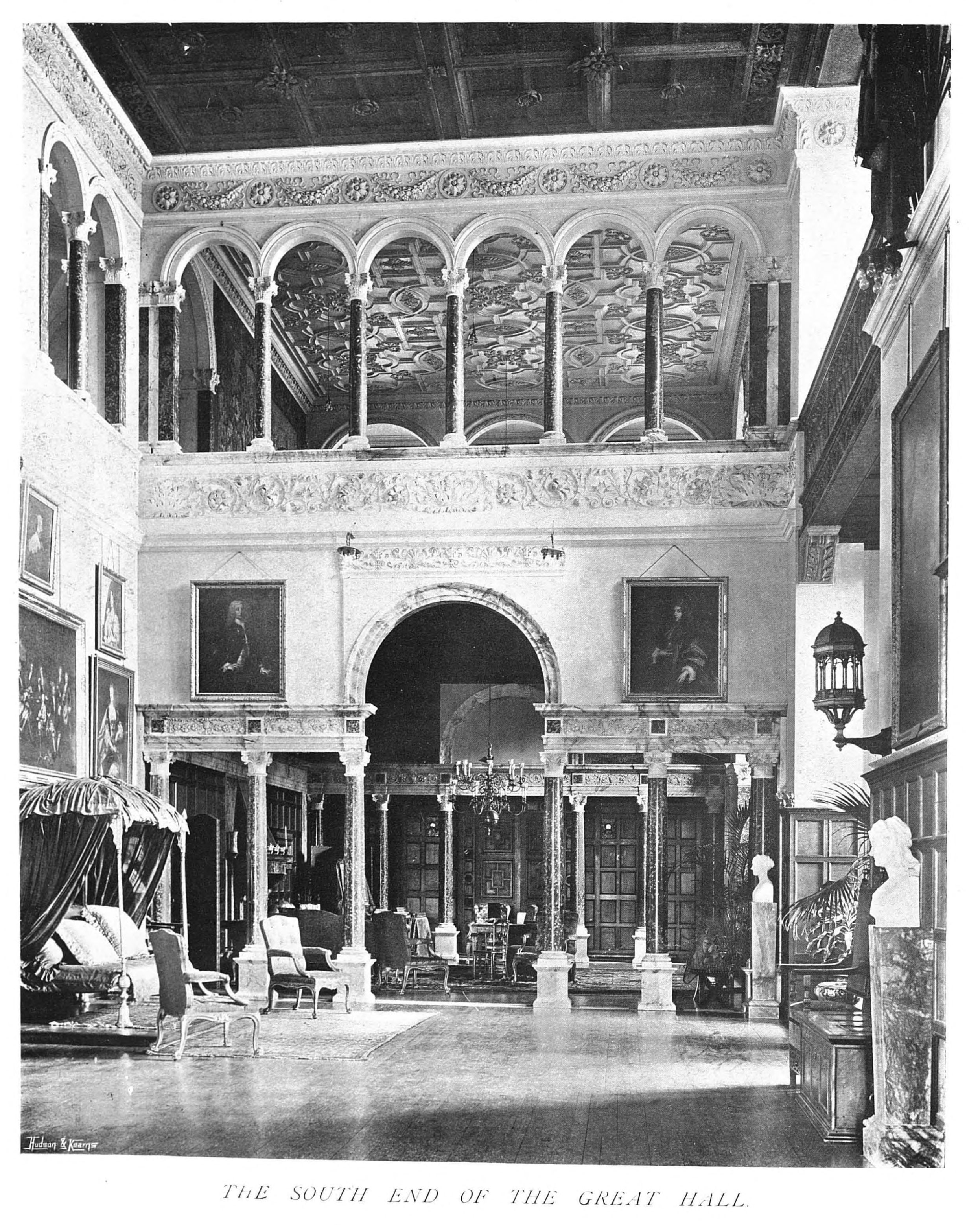
The Great Hall – south end

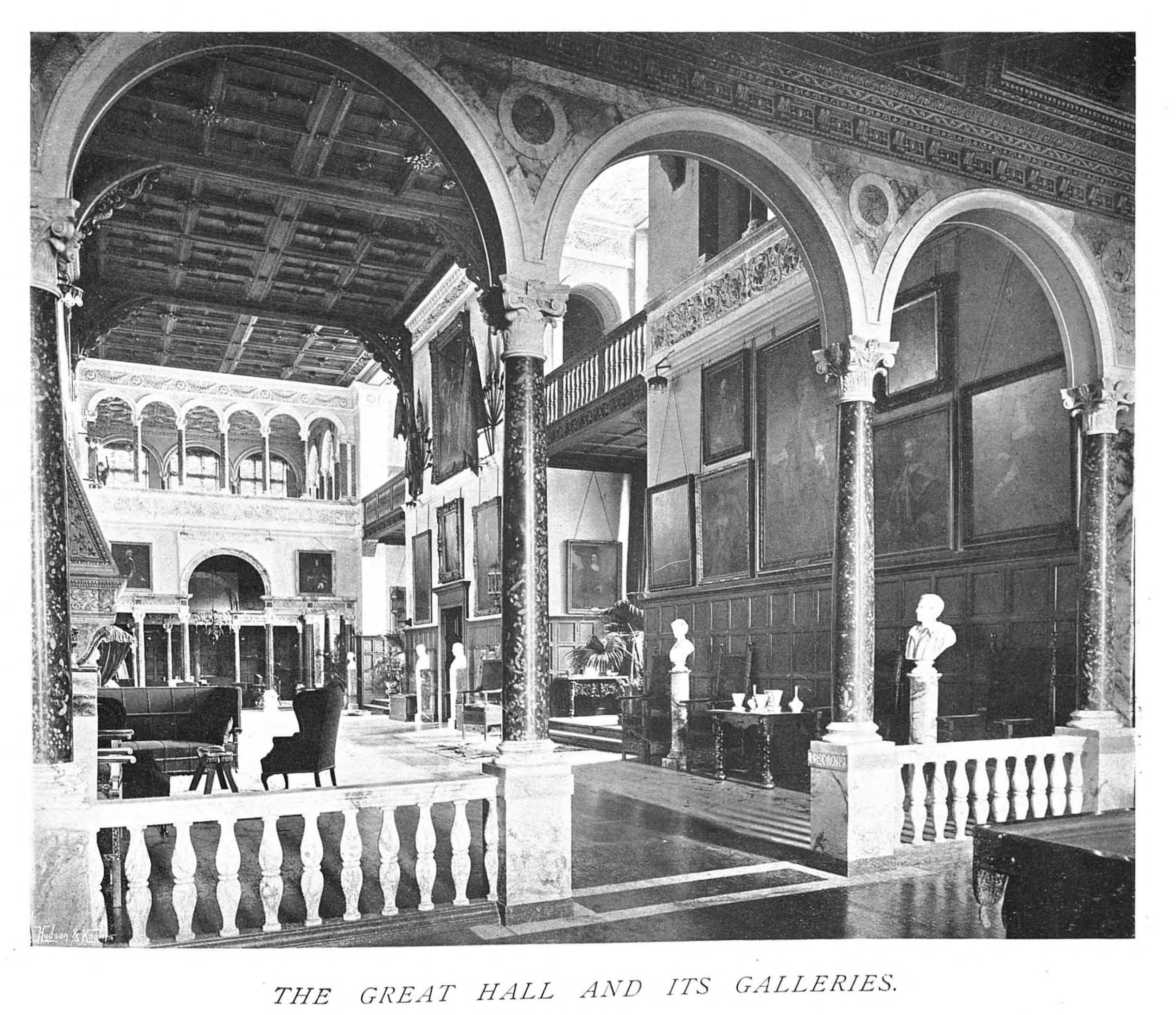
The Great Hall – galleries

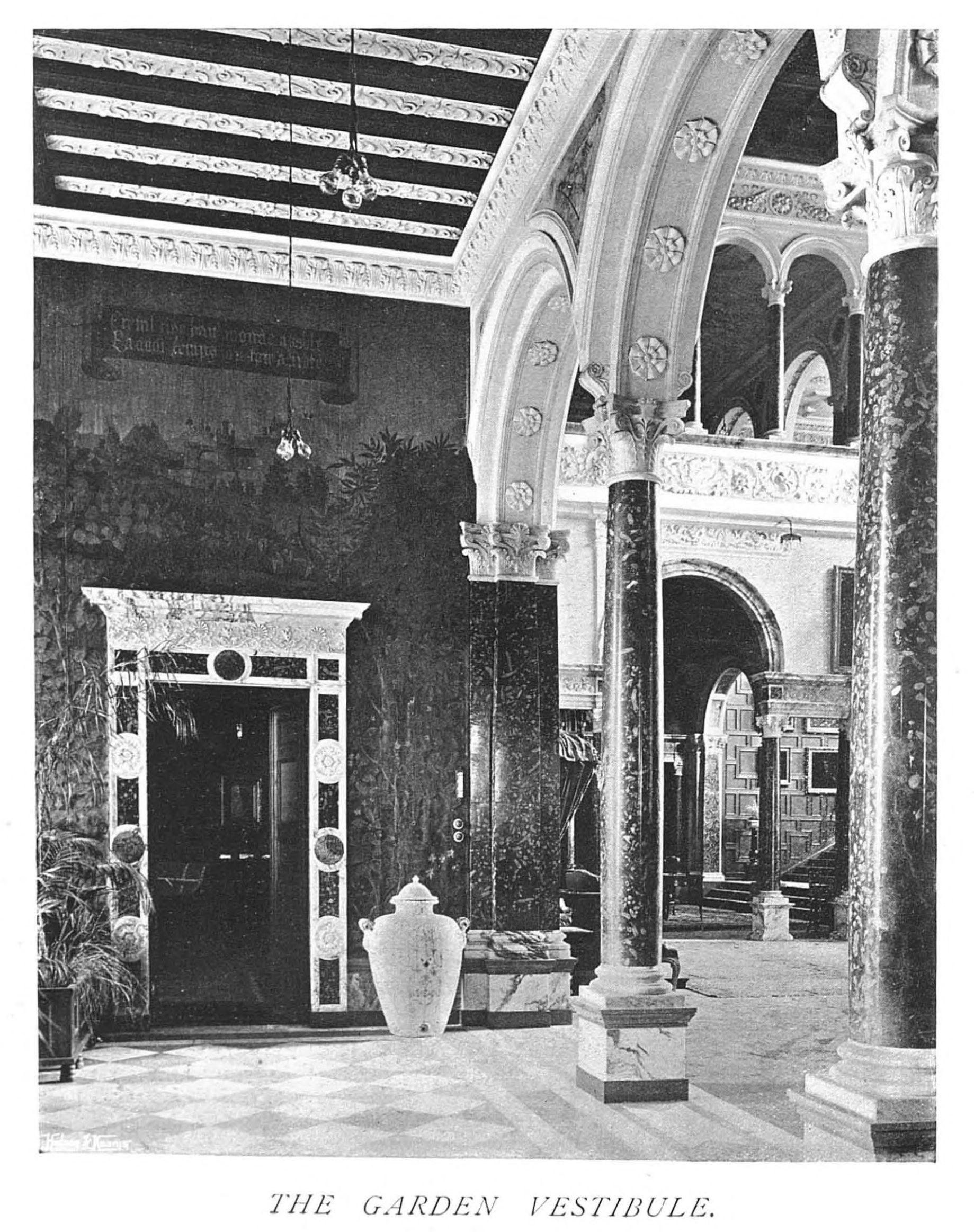
The garden vestibule

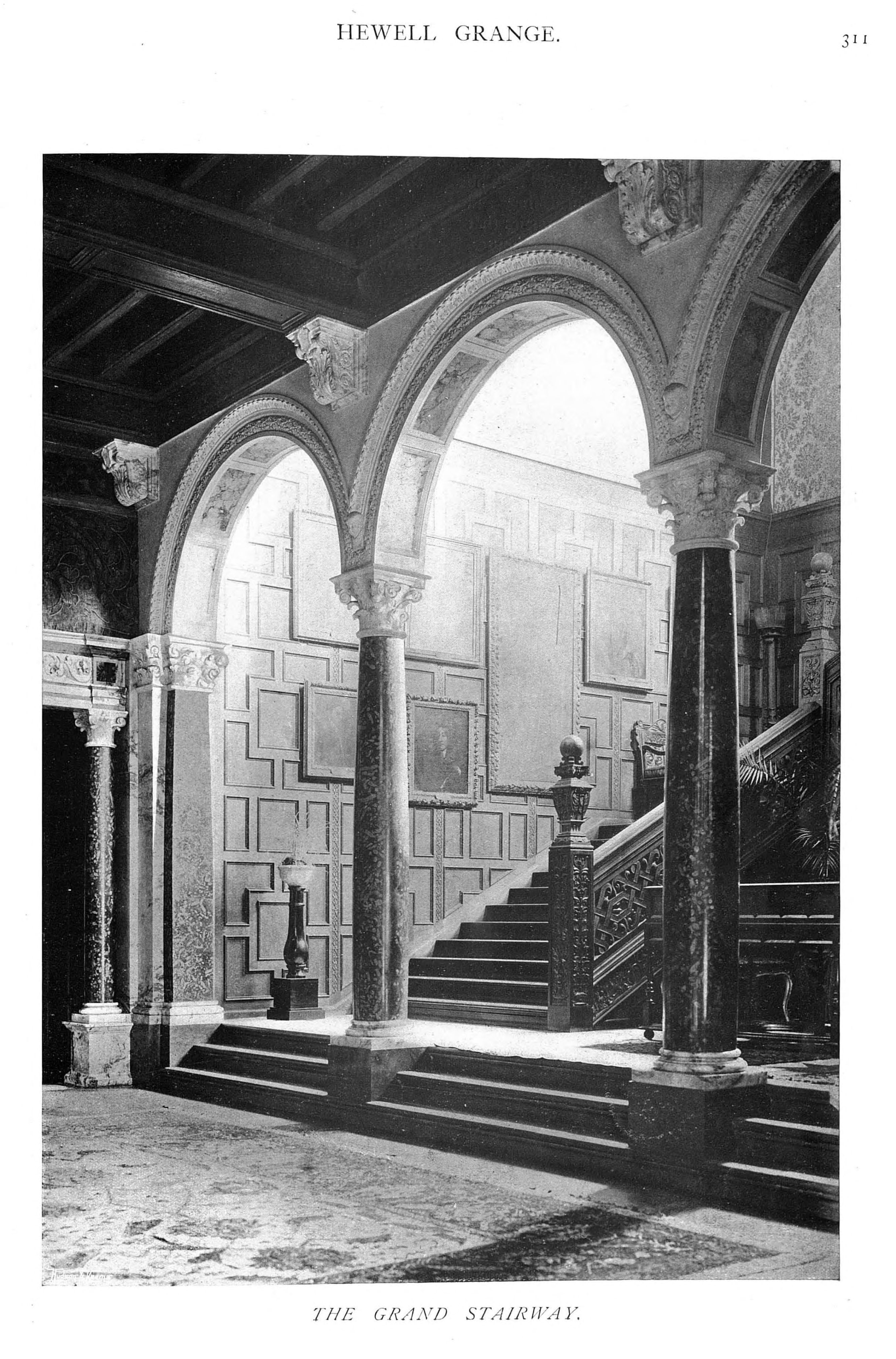
The Grand Staircase

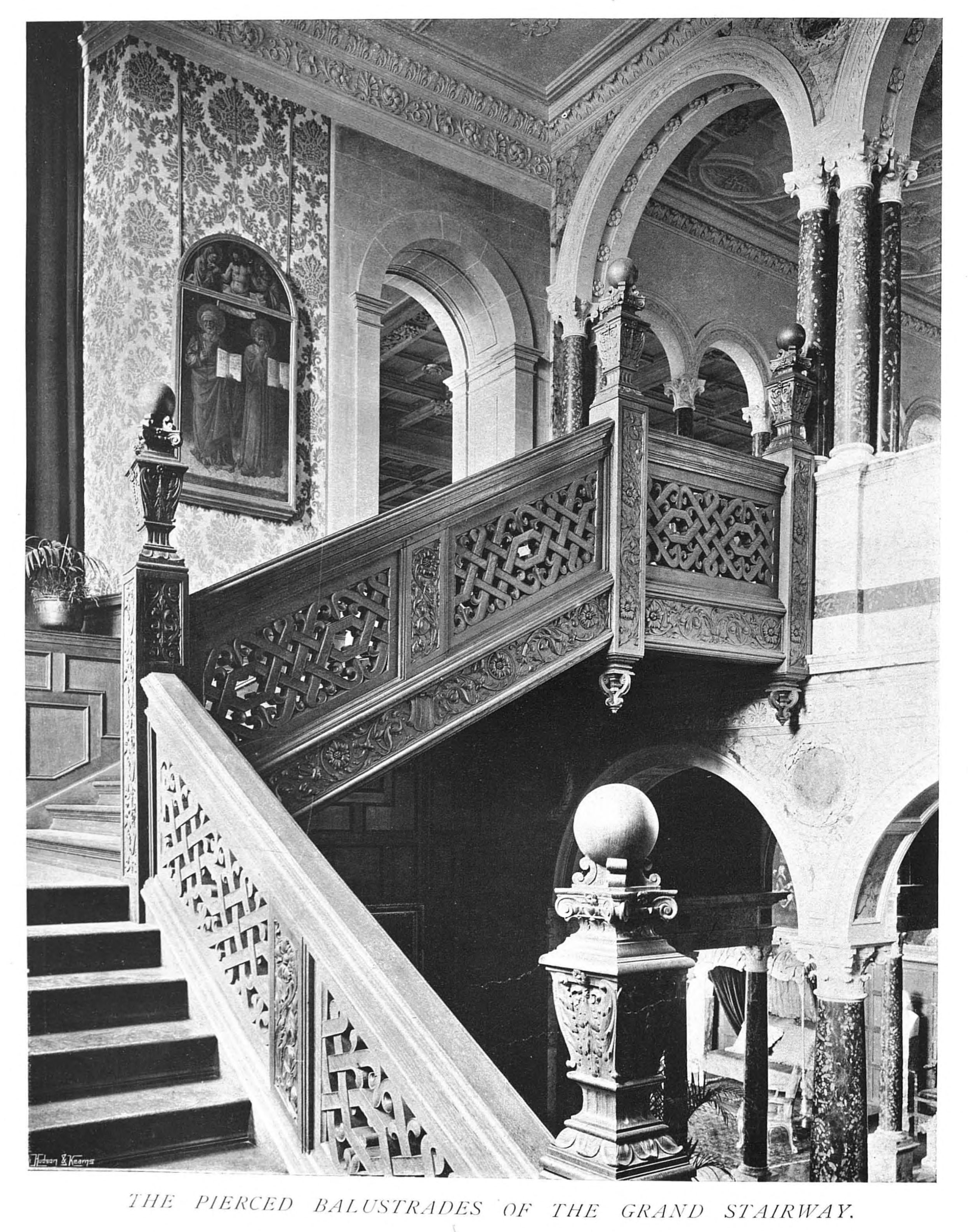
The Grand Staircase – balustrades

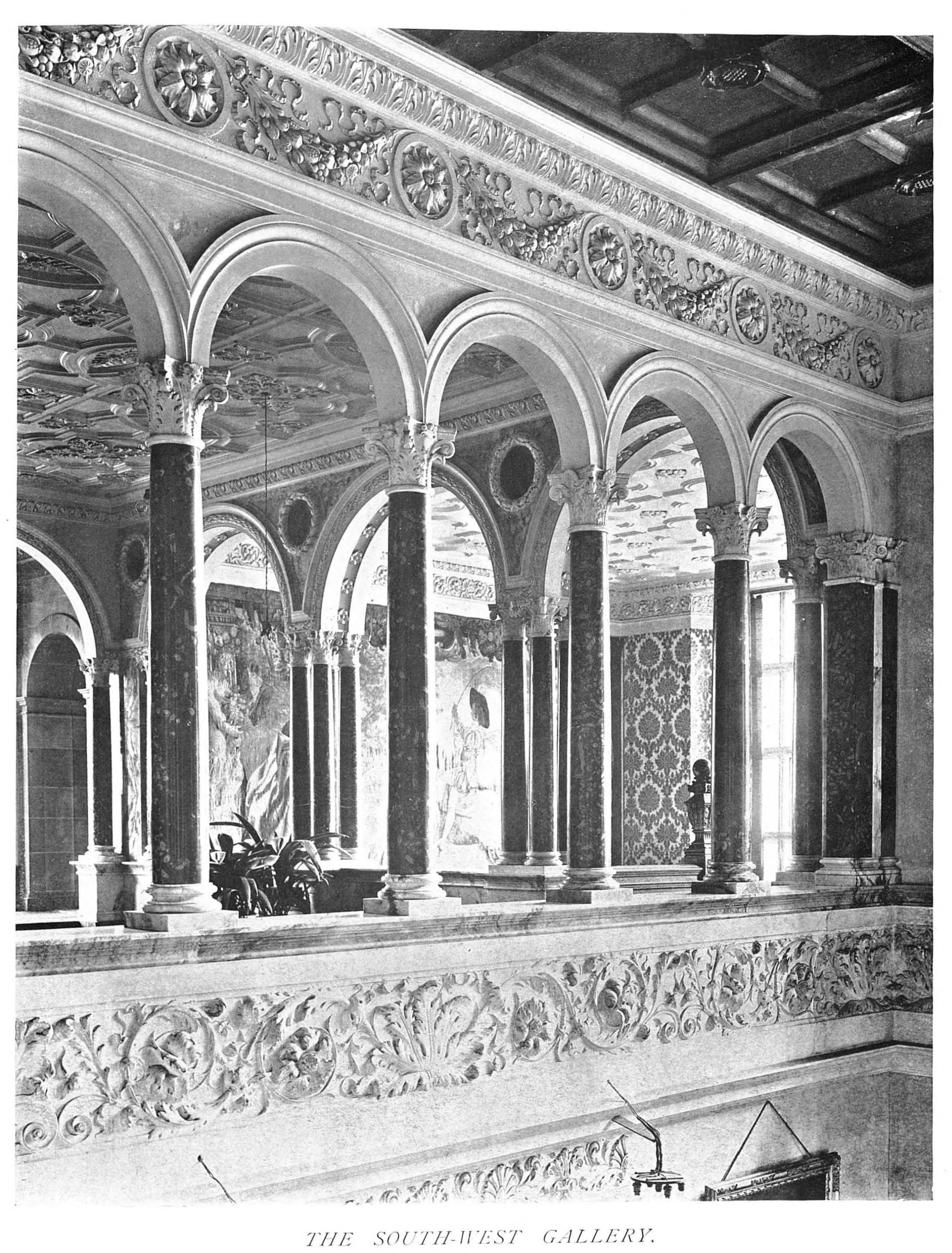
The south-west Gallery

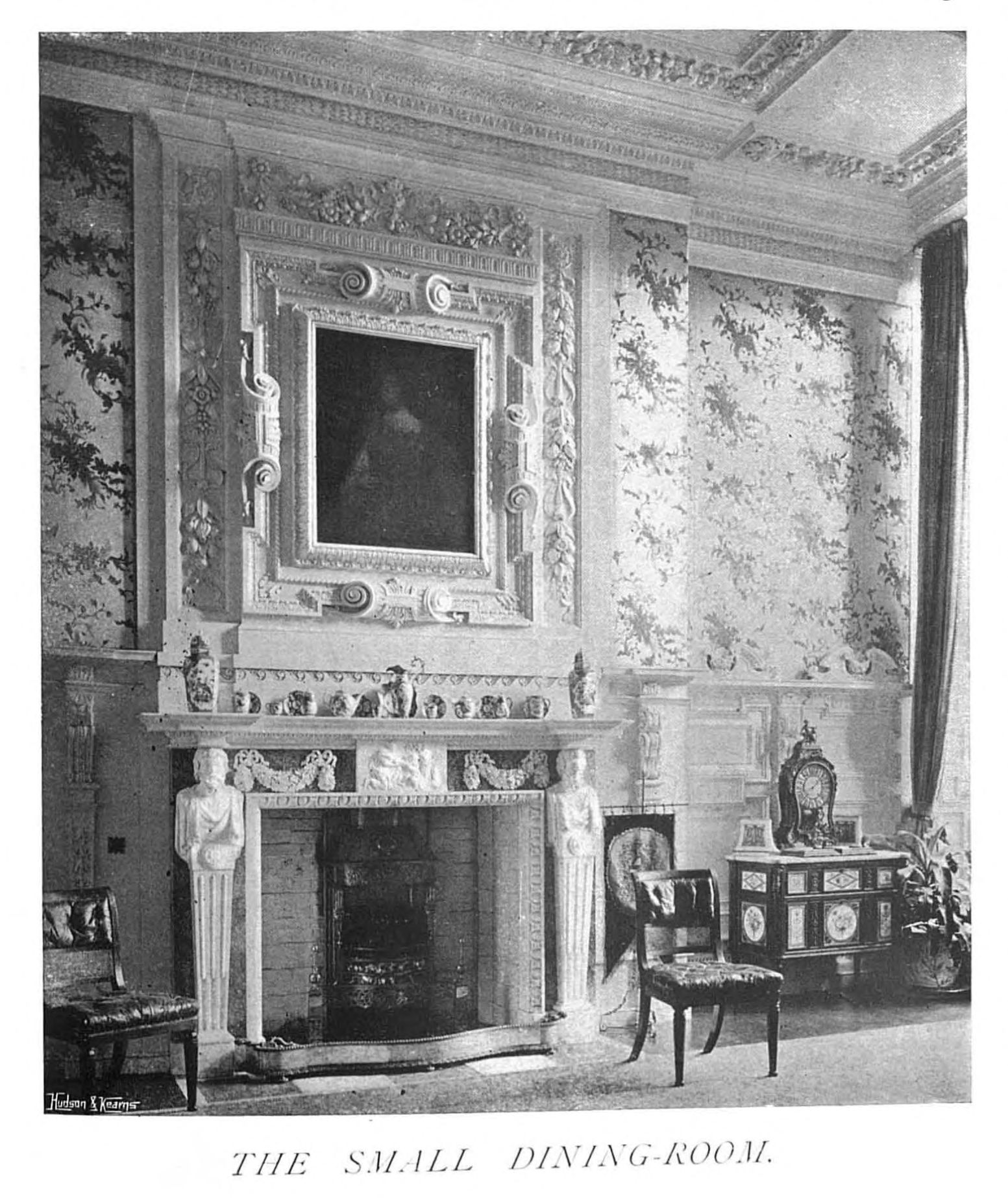
The Small Dining Room

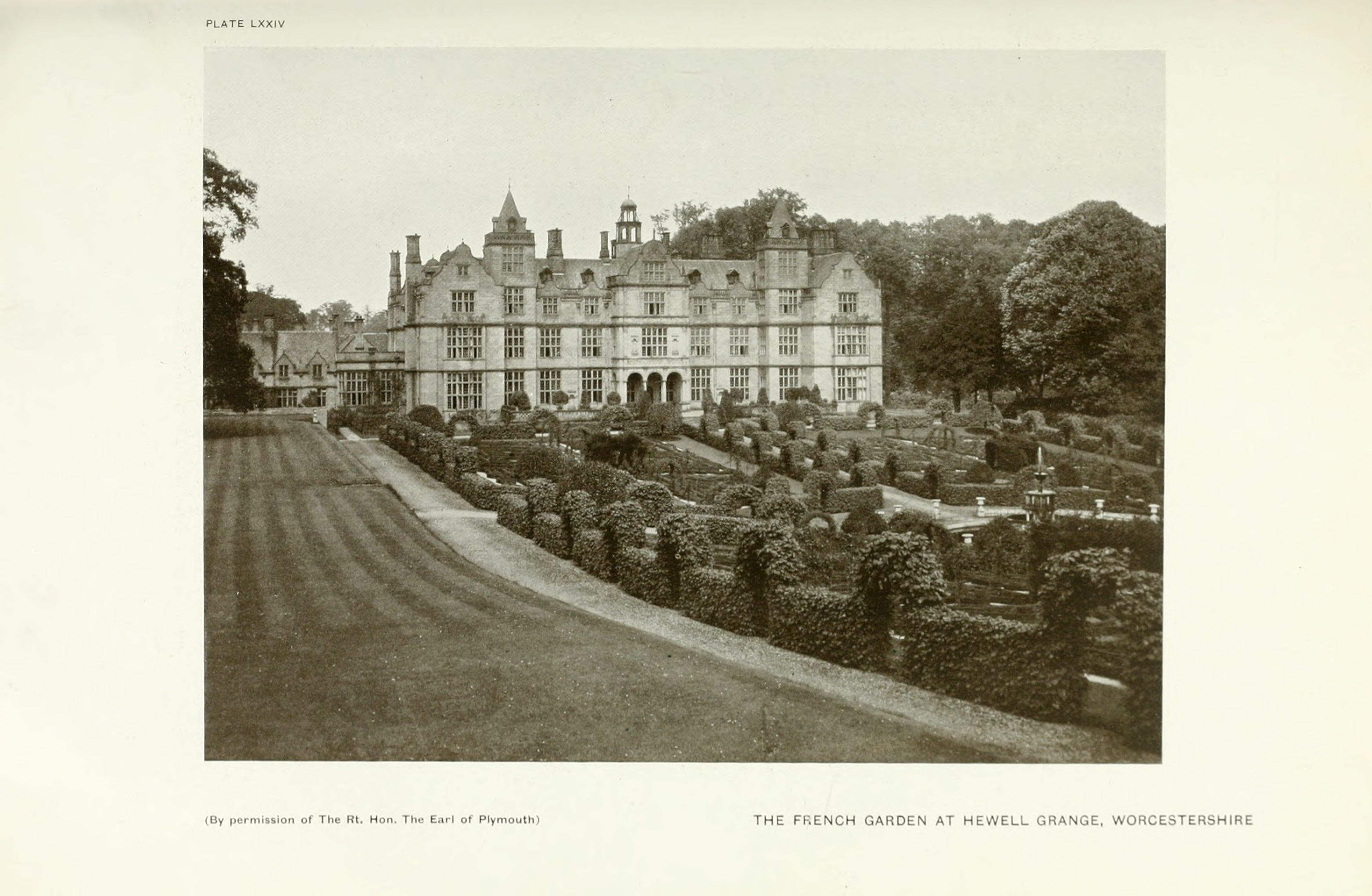
The French garden

== Sources ==
- Balfour, Arthur; Elcho, Mary (1992). Jane Ridley; Clayre Percy (eds.). The Letters of Arthur Balfour and Lady Elcho 1885–1917. London: Hamish Hamilton Ltd. ISBN 978-0-241-12474-1. OCLC 59166664.
- Brooks, Alan; Pevsner, Nikolaus (2007). Worcestershire. The Buildings of England. Yale University Press. ISBN 978-0-300-11298-6.
- Cannadine, David (1992). The Decline and Fall of the British Aristocracy. London, UK: Pan Books. ISBN 978-0-330-32188-4.
- Dakers, Caroline (1993). Clouds: The Biography of a Country House. New Haven, US and London: Yale University Press. ISBN 978-0-300-05776-8.
- Girouard, Mark (1979). The Victorian Country House. New Haven, US and London: Yale University Press. ISBN 978-0-300-02390-9. OCLC 979203757.
- Hall, Michael (2009). The Victorian Country House. London, UK: Aurum Press. ISBN 978-1-84513-457-0.
- — (2014). George Frederick Bodley and the later Gothic Revival in Britain and America. New Haven, US and London: Yale University Press. ISBN 978-0-300-20802-3. OCLC 983761471.
- Jenkins, Jennifer; James, Patrick (1994). From acorn to oak tree: the growth of the National Trust 1895–1994. London: Macmillan. ISBN 978-0-333-58953-3. OCLC 477309495.
- Pevsner, Nikolaus (1968). Worcestershire. Harmondsworth, Middlesex: Penguin Books. OCLC 920896182.
