= Andrew Windsor, 1st Baron Windsor =

English peer (1467–1543)

Andrew Windsor, 1st Baron Windsor (Wyndsore, Wyndesor) KB (1467–1543), was a member of parliament, English peer, and Keeper of the Wardrobe, knight banneret and military commander.

== Name ==
In manuscript and printed sources dated before 1650 his name consistently appears as 'Andrew' or 'Andrewe'. In 1676 Sir William Dugdale (1605–1686) gave an account of him in The Baronage of England, partly based on information from 'Thomas, late Lord Windsor deceased' (6th Lord Windsor, died 1642), in which he is called 'Andrews' Windsor, Andrews having been the maiden name of Sir Andrew's mother.

Arthur Collins gave the account that the 6th Lord, dying without issue, in 1641 settled his estate upon his intended heir, his sister's son Thomas-Windsor Hickman (then in his minority), on condition that he assume the name and arms of the Windsor family. The title was restored in him (in fulfilment of a warrant instigated by King Charles I) by King Charles II in 1660, as the 7th Lord Windsor.

In spirited compliance with his late uncle's intention, he reshaped his name to Windsor-Hickman, and chose ancestral names for his own children, naming one 'Other' after the Domesday ancestor, and another (in 1678) Andrews Windsor. This appears to be the origin of the revision in the 1st Baron's name made by Dugdale.

The 7th Lord Windsor was advanced to the dignity of 1st Earl of Plymouth by Letters Patent in 1682. Several very learned authors, notably Arthur Collins, Daniel Lysons and Sir Harris Nicolas, perhaps of courtesy, followed Dugdale's indication (if it was not simply a misprint, since he uses both forms) and went so far as to alter the form 'Andrewe' (in manuscript sources) to 'Andrews' in their printed transcripts of the same documents referring to the 1st Baron Windsor. Others, notably John Burke, resisted the alteration, resulting in two separate nomenclature traditions. In modern usage in historical contexts, the 1st Baron Windsor is referred to as Sir Andrew, the name used during his own lifetime.

== Origins and early life ==
In 1086 the manor of Stanwell, Middlesex, was held by William Fitz Othere, Constable of Windsor Castle. Stanwell was held as from the Castle, and William's descendants took the name Wyndsore. Thomas Wyndsore, Andrew's father, was aged 11 when his father Miles Wyndsore died while on pilgrimage in Ferrara, Italy in 1451/2: Miles's wife was Joan, daughter of Walter Green, M.P., of Hayes, Middlesex (d. 1456), (and sister of Katherine Green (died 1498), successively wife of William Stalworth (died c. 1445), John Gaynesford of Crowhurst (died 1460) and Sir Edmund Rede of Boarstall (1417–1489).). Thomas Wyndsore as fee lord of Hampton Poyle, Oxfordshire, demised it in 11 Edward IV to Katherine Rede, in respect of the Gaynesford and Warner connection with the Poyle family.

Around 1465, Thomas married Elizabeth Andrewes, daughter of John and Elizabeth Andrewes of Baylham, Suffolk, and Andrew, the eldest surviving son, was born c. 1467. Several children of Thomas are enumerated in the wills of Elizabeth Andrewes senior and her sister Dame Alice Wyche, both of whom died in 1474. Having made his own will in 1479, Thomas was advised to prepare himself to receive the Order of Knighthood at King Edward V's Coronation in June 1483, but those honours never materialised. In 1485, Richard III appointed him Constable of Windsor Castle. Following the Battle of Bosworth, his lands were forfeit, but immediately restored to him by Henry VII. He died a week later; his will naming Andrew his heir was proved on 14 February 1485/6.

== Early career ==
After his father's death, Andrew's mother Elizabeth remarried to Sir Robert Lytton, who became Keeper of the Wardrobe to Henry VII in 1492. Lytton acquired the reversion of the manor of Knebworth in Hertfordshire from the estate of Sir Thomas Bourchier (died 1491, a younger son of the 1st Earl of Essex), who had it in right of his former wife Isabel (Barre), widow of Humphrey Stafford, 1st Earl of Devon. Bourgchier had married secondly Anne Andrews (widow of Sir John Sulyard and sister of Elizabeth), who long survived him and died at Wetherden, Suffolk in 1520.

Andrew married Elizabeth Blount, sister and coheir of Edward Blount, 2nd Baron Mountjoy. His brother John Wyndsore, of the Middle Temple, married Anne Fiennes, daughter of Sir Thomas Fiennes of Claverham in Arlington, East Sussex: his brother Anthony Wyndsore married Elizabeth daughter of Henry Lovell and Constance Hussey, heiress of Harting, Sussex. His sisters Elizabeth and Alice married Richard Fowler and George Puttenham respectively. Among Andrew's inheritances were estates in Suffolk including Andrews Hall in Sproughton and Stoke, property coming from the Andrewes side, mentioned in the 1522 Perambulation of Ipswich and in Andrew's will. Throughout his life Wyndsore acquired estates in many parts of the kingdom.

Having entered the Middle Temple, during the 1500s he was appointed J.P. of several counties (including Hampshire (1502), Middlesex (1505) and Buckinghamshire (1507)), was Commissioner for Subsidies for Middlesex and Buckinghamshire in 1503, was Steward to the lands of Edward Stafford, 3rd Duke of Buckingham in Hampshire in 1504, and held various other commissions in those counties and in London and Essex. He was a feoffee for Henry VII in a 1504 land transaction concerning Syon Abbey, where his sister Margaret led a religious life. He also acted as feoffee for his brother-in-law Edmund Dudley, Speaker of the House of Commons, who had married his sister Anne. When his stepfather died in 1505, making Dame Elizabeth his executor and Andrew Wyndsore and Edmund Dudley his supervisors, Andrew was appointed Keeper of the Wardrobe in his place, opening great opportunities for enrichment. In handling the King's finances Dudley amassed wealth and estates, and became a foremost mediator of royal favour and influence.

Edmund Dudley and Richard Empson were immediately imprisoned on the death of the King in 1509, but Wyndsore was among those to be invested Knight of the Bath at the Coronation of King Henry VIII. During their indictment and conviction for Constructive treason Dudley and Empson were held in the Tower of London, where Dudley declared a will making Bishop FitzJames, Sir Andrew Wyndsore, Dean Colet and Dr Yonge his executors or feoffees. Wyndsore was thereby joined in Dudley's attempt to resist the predatory intentions towards his estates of John Ernley, who as Attorney General for England and Wales was deeply embedded in the new king's favour. Following Dudley's execution in 1510, in which year Wyndsore sat as Member of Parliament for Cricklade, these matters came into court in 1512.

== Knight service ==
Wyndsore played a significant part in Henry's military expedition to France in 1513. He arrived at Calais on 30 June in the King's own party, together with Viscount Lisle, Lord Willoughby and others, as Treasurer of the King's middle-ward. He was present at the Siege of Thérouanne and at the Battle of the Spurs, after which he was among the first to be advanced as Knights Bannerets. The King's army afterwards set down before Tournay, which they also took.

It was then as a Knight Banneret with 20 horse that in 1514 he attended Mary, the King's sister, in her journey to France for her marriage to Louis XII. In England he resumed his stewardships for the Duke of Buckingham, and his subsidy and other commissions, in Buckinghamshire and Berkshire, Middlesex and elsewhere, from which it has been inferred that he sat in the Parliaments of 1512 and 1515.

Wyndsore's land tenures in Berkshire required him to supply ten men for military service, an obligation demanded of him in Henry's 10th year. In 1520 he was summoned to attend the King and Queen at Canterbury, and then with 11 servants and 8 horses to join his train to Calais and Guisnes, to the meeting with the King of France at the Field of the Cloth of Gold: and thence to Gravelines in Flanders, where they were welcomed by Emperor Charles V, and bidden to send half their servants home by Cardinal Wolsey.

== Home affairs ==
In that year of 1520 Wyndsore's eldest son and heir George (who had married Ursula de Vere, sister of the 14th Earl of Oxford) died, being still a young man. He was buried in a chapel belonging to Hounslow Trinitarian Priory, not far from Stanwell and from Syon Abbey, where Margaret Wyndsore, Andrew's sister, became prioress.

In 1522, complaints were brought by English merchants who had factors at Bordeaux, that the French King had (contrary to promises of restitution) seized or rifled their goods, restrained their ships in the ports and imprisoned their men. The French ambassador's answer being found unsatisfactory, Wolsey gave order that the four French hostages who were held in England as surety for tribute from Tournay should be held separately confined by Lord St.John, Sir Thomas Lovell, Sir Thomas Nevill and Sir Andrew Wyndsore, and the ambassador to keep his house, while many Frenchmen in London were imprisoned.

There are further indications that he sat in Parliament in 1523, inferred from legislation which enabled him, and his brother Anthony, to retain stewardships granted by the Duke of Buckingham, and from records of their provisos in the Duke's attainder.

== Campaign 1523 and later years ==
After the provocations and conflicts of the following months, in August 1523, at the urging of Parliament, an army royal was sent into France, under the general command of the Duke of Suffolk, of which Sir Andrew Wyndsore was one of the commanders. From Calais they met with King Christian II of Denmark at Gravelines, and, following the successful siege of Bell Castle in late September, the English proceeded across the Somme through Bray and Roye, making highly effective use of modern artillery, to the siege of Montdidier, which capitulated on 28 October. The expedition however ended in winter cold and misery.

Over the following three years Wyndesore was repeatedly nominated by the Duke of Norfolk and Duke of Suffolk, and others, for admission to the Order of the Garter, but these recommendations did not win the royal assent. However he remained in the favour of Wolsey, to whom he was a commissioner in his court of requests, and became a counsellor to him in matter of law. Once again he survived the fall of a favourer, and in November 1529, apparently by royal intervention, he was elected to Parliament as Knight of the Shire for Buckinghamshire. His occupation of that seat was very brief, for on 1 December he was admitted to the Upper House as Baron Windsor 'of Bradenham, in the county of Buckinghamshire'.

An early action in his capacity as a temporal lord was to subscribe to the letter to Pope Clement VII seeking his compliance with the King's proposed divorce from Queen Katherine, which, if he would not confirm, 'they should therein rest satisfied, and seek to attain this end by other means'. He attended the House regularly thereafter. Despite further nominations he was never admitted to the Garter. With the Duke of Norfolk he was named executor in the will of Archbishop Warham in 1530, and swore to probate in 1532. With some success he attempted to moderate the circumstances of the monastic closures upon Syon Abbey. He was summoned to attend Queen Jane in 1536, and greeted Anne of Cleves at Blackheath in 1539. Perhaps over-emboldened by his wealth and position, he was often litigious on behalf of his various estates and did not fear to challenge men of influence.

== Dispossession, death and exequies ==
The last chapter of his story was communicated from family tradition to Sir William Dugdale. Thomas Cromwell, before his attainder, having encouraged Henry to dispose of the monasteries by sale or advantageous transfer to the gentry and nobility, the king invited himself to Stanwell, where he was given a magnificent reception late in 1542. He then announced to Wyndesore that he was to surrender Stanwell and all its lands (including estates in Middlesex, Surrey, Buckinghamshire, Berkshire and Hampshire) to him, for a beneficial exchange. Wyndsore pleaded humbly that it had been his family seat for many generations, but the intransigent monarch sternly replied It must be, and sent him to the Attorney-General to learn that he was to receive Bordesley Abbey, with its possessions in Worcestershire, (associated with the township of Tardebigge). Great provisions had been laid in for Christmas, which Sir Andrew left at Stanwell, saying that the place should not be found bare. He was given the seat of Hewell Grange in the manor of Tardebigge.

Wyndsore dated his will 26 March 1543, as from Stanwell, and died four days later. His wife had died before him, and he left careful instructions that he should be buried with her in the chapel at Hounslow, and a suitable monument 'with arms, images and scriptures' to be erected for them, and the tomb of his son George to be properly finished. He appointed as executors his sons William and Edward, Sir Thomas Audley of Walden (Lord Chancellor) and Sir John Baker (Chancellor of the Tenths), and for his overseers his brother Sir Anthony Wyndsore and Thomas Duke of Norfolk. William and Edward proved his will in July 1543.

Andrew's son William, 2nd Baron Windsor held the manor and chapel at Hounslow at his death 1558, and when sold by his son Edward Windsor, 3rd Baron Windsor in 1571 the purchaser covenanted to maintain the tombs of Sir Andrew and George Wyndsore. A wall monument showing a kneeling figure in armour with his wife, surrounded by a moulding but lacking an inscription, may be that for Andrew and Elizabeth. A stone bearing the arms of Wyndsore quartered with those of Andrewes, and with two others (defaced), and inscribed 'Monsyr Andrews Wanedsor', before 1828 in an early perimeter wall, was reset in the vestry wall of the church rebuilt in 1828, but seems to have been lost in the modern rebuilding of Holy Trinity church. The inscription to his son George is lost since John Weever recorded it.

== Family ==
Andrew Windsor married Elizabeth, daughter of William Blount and Margaret Echyngham (and sister and co-heir of Edward Blount, 2nd Baron Mountjoy), with whom he had the following children:

- George Windsor (died 1520), eldest son and heir, who married Ursula de Vere (died 1558), daughter of Sir George de Vere and Margaret Stafford.
- Sir William Windsor, who succeeded his father as 2nd Baron Windsor (1542–1558). He married (1) Margaret Sambourne (died before 1554), daughter of William Sambourne and Anne Copley, by 1527. He married (2) Elizabeth Cowdrey (c. 1520-1588/89), daughter of Piers and Dorothy Cowdrey of Herriard, Hampshire, and widow of Richard Paulet, about 1554. He was succeeded by his son Edward Windsor, 3rd Baron Windsor.
- Edmund Windsor, Esq., of Stoke Poges, Buckinghamshire, one of the Knights of the Carpet (1553).
- Thomas Windsor, of Bentley, Hampshire, M.P., married Mary (died 1574) daughter and heir of Thomas Beckingham of Buscot (formerly Berkshire, now Oxfordshire). The Beckinghams held the manors of Philpots Court at Buscot, and of Upton Russels, formerly in Blewbury, latterly Upton: both came through Mary to her husband Thomas Windsor, and passed successively to three of their sons.
- Elizabeth Windsor (died 1548–49), married Sir Peter Vavasour of Spaldington (died 5 March 1556), son of William Vavasour of Gunby and Alice Mallory.
- Anne Windsor, married Roger Corbet of Moreton Corbet, Shropshire, Esq. (born 24 June 1501, died 20 December 1538), son of Sir Robert Corbet and Elizabeth Vernon, by 1520 in Lyncheslade, Buckinghamshire.
- Edith Windsor, married George Ludlow (c.1523–1580) of Hill Deverill, Esq., son of William Ludlow, Esq. and Jane Moore, before 26 March 1543 in Wiltshire.
- Eleanor Windsor, married (1) Ralph Scrope, 10th Baron Scrope of Masham (whose marriage to Cecily of York was annulled), who died 17 September 1515; and (2), before 1524, Sir Edward Neville of Addington Park, West Malling, Kent, son of Sir George Nevill, 4th Baron Bergavenny and Margaret, daughter of Hugh Fenn. Edward (born c. 1482) was brother of George Nevill, 5th Baron Bergavenny. He was beheaded on Tower Hill on 8 December 1538. Sir Henry Neville of Billingbear was their son.

Government offices
Preceded by Sir Robert Lytton	Keeper of the Wardrobe; 1504–1543	Succeeded by Sir Ralph Sadleir
Peerage of England
New creation	Baron Windsor; 1529–1543	Succeeded by William Windsor
