= Others =

Others or The Others may refer to:

== Fictional characters ==
- Others (A Song of Ice and Fire), supernatural creatures in the George R. R. Martin fantasy series
- Others (Lost), mysterious characters in the television series Lost
- Others (Night Watch), people with supernatural abilities in Sergey Lukyanenko's Watches novel pentalogy
- The Others (Vok), a character from the Beast Wars franchise
- The Others, Cro-Magnon peoples in Jean M. Auel's Earth's Children series
- The Others, allies of Aquaman in comics
- The Others, the Ancients who have achieved Ascension in the Stargate universe
- The Others, alien extraterrestrials in The 5th Wave novels and film

== Films ==
- The Others (1974 film), a drama by Argentinian director Hugo Santiago
- The Others (1997 film), a comedy by Travis Fine
- The Others (2001 film), a horror film starring Nicole Kidman

== Literature ==
- Others, a 1999 novel by James Herbert
- Others: A Magazine of the New Verse, a literary magazine edited by Alfred Kreymborg
- The Others, a modern fantasy series by American author Anne Bishop
- The Others, the first novel of a 1990–1993 trilogy by Margaret Wander Bonanno
- The Others (novel), by Alison Prince

== Music ==
=== Groups and labels ===
- The Others (American band), a 1960s garage rock band
- The Others (band), a 2000s British rock band

=== Albums and songs ===
- The Others (Dukes of Windsor album), 2006
  - "The Others" (song), from the album
- The Others (Miyavi album), 2015
- The Others (The Others album), 2005

== Television ==
- The Others (American TV series), a 2000 horror series
- The Others (Brazilian TV series), a 2023 drama series
- "The Others" (The Amazing World of Gumball), a television episode
- "The Others", a season 4 episode of the TV series Andromeda
- Others (TV series), a 2024 Russian fantasy miniseries

== Other uses ==
- Others (art group), an early 20th century modernist collective

== See also ==
- Another (disambiguation)
- Indefinite pronoun, a pronoun that refers to non-specific beings, objects, or places
- Other (disambiguation)
