= Another =

Another may refer to:

- anOther or Another Magazine, a culture and fashion magazine
- Another (novel), a Japanese horror novel
  - Another (film), a Japanese 2012 live-action film based on the novel
  - Another (TV series), a Japanese 2012 animated series based on the novel
- Another River, in the U.S. state of Alaska
- A. N. Other, a placeholder name

== See also ==
- Yet another
- Indefinite pronoun
- English determiners
- Other (disambiguation)
- Others (disambiguation)
