= Earl of Plymouth =

English title of nobility

- Arms of Windsor-Clive: Quarterly: 1st & 4th, Argent, on a Fess Sable, three Mullets Or (Clive); 2nd & 3rd, Gules, a Saltire Argent, between twelve Crosses-Crosslet Or (Windsor). Crests: 1st: a Griffin statant Argent, ducally gorged Gules (Clive). 2nd: a Stag's Head affrontée, couped at the neck Argent, attired Or (Windsor). Supporters: On either side a Unicorn Argent, armed, maned, tufted and unguled Or.
- Creation date: 18 December 1905 (3rd creation)
- Creation: Third
- Created by: King Edward VII
- Peerage: Peerage of the United Kingdom
- First holder: Robert Windsor-Clive, 1st Earl of Plymouth
- Present holder: Ivor Windsor-Clive, 4th Earl of Plymouth
- Heir apparent: Robert Windsor-Clive, Viscount Windsor
- Remainder to: the 1st Earl's heirs male of the body lawfully begotten
- Subsidiary titles: Viscount Windsor; Baron Windsor
- Status: Extant
- Motto: JE ME FIE EN DIEU (I trust in God)

Robert Windsor-Clive, 1st Earl of Plymouth

Earl of Plymouth is a title that has been created three times: twice in the Peerage of England and once in the Peerage of the United Kingdom.

== History ==
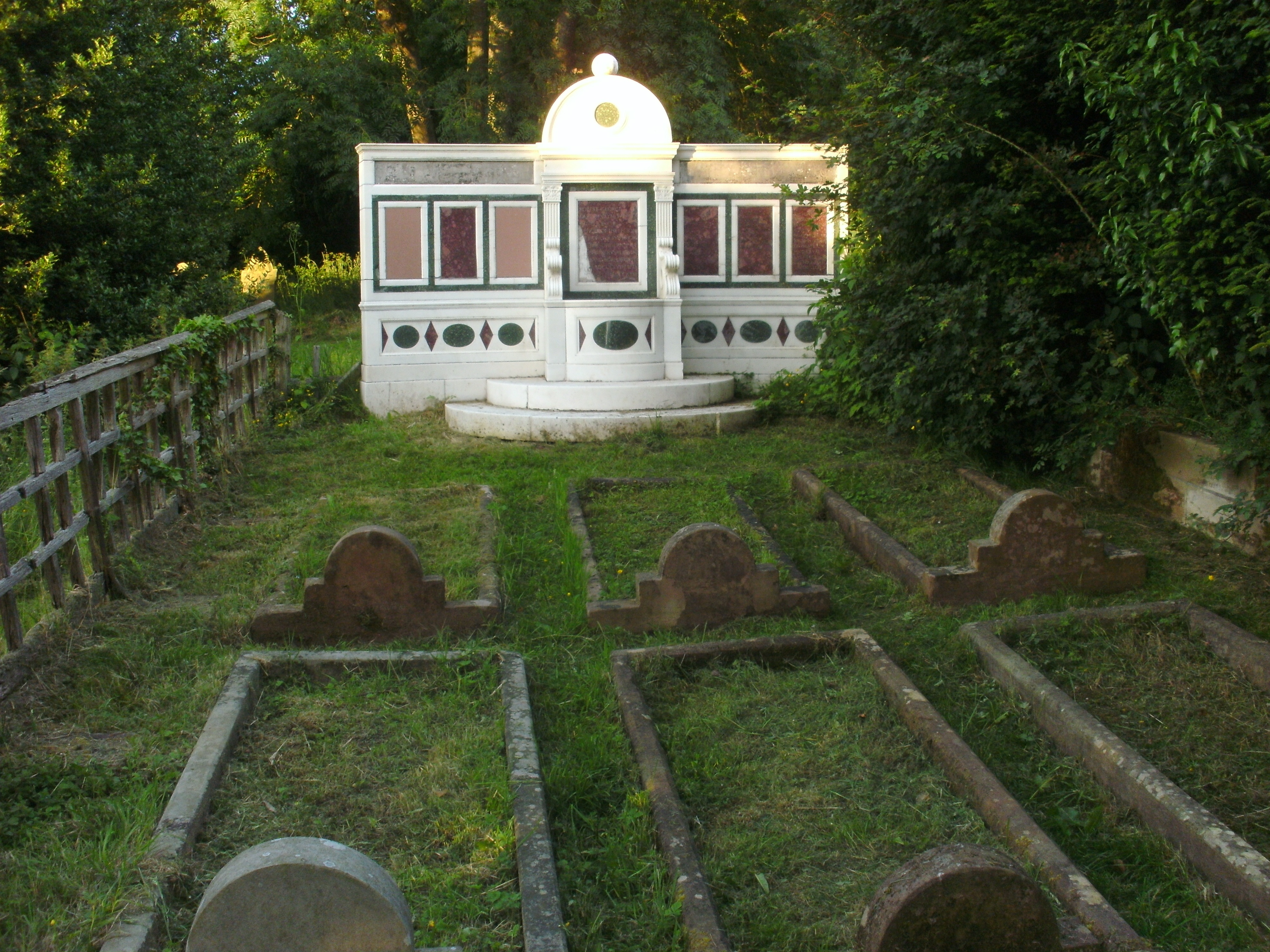
Windsor-Clive family plot in the cemetery of St Bartholomew's church, Tardebigge, Worcestershire. Robert, 1st Earl of Plymouth (1857–1923), and his family are buried here.

The first creation was in 1675 for Charles FitzCharles, one of the dozens of illegitimate children of King Charles II and one of a few by his mistress Catherine Pegge. He died without heirs in 1680, and the title became extinct.

The second creation came in 1682 in favour of Thomas Hickman-Windsor, 7th Baron Windsor. The family descends from Sir Andrew Windsor, who fought at the Battle of the Spurs in 1513, where he was knighted. In 1529 he was summoned to Parliament as Baron Windsor, of Stanwell in the County of Buckingham. His grandson, Edward, the third Baron, fought at the Battle of St Quentin in 1557. Edward's elder son Frederick, the fourth Baron, died unmarried at an early age and was succeeded by his younger brother, Henry. The latter's son, Thomas, the sixth Baron, was a Rear-Admiral in the Royal Navy. On Thomas's death in 1641, the barony fell into abeyance between his sisters.

The abeyance was terminated in 1660 in favour of his nephew, Thomas Hickman. He was the son of Elizabeth Windsor, and her husband Dixie Hickman, and assumed the additional surname of Windsor as 7th Baron. He notably served as Governor of Jamaica and as Lord Lieutenant of Worcestershire. In 1682, he was created Earl of Plymouth in the Peerage of England, a higher title of nobility. He was succeeded by his grandson Other, who notably served as Lord Lieutenant of Cheshire, Denbigh and Flint. His grandson and namesake, Other, the fourth Earl, was Lord Lieutenant of Glamorganshire.

On the death of fourth Earl's childless grandson, Other, the sixth Earl, in 1833, the barony and earldom separated. The barony fell into abeyance between his sisters Lady Maria Windsor, wife of Arthur Hill, 3rd Marquess of Downshire, and Lady Harriet Windsor, wife of Robert Clive, second son of Edward Clive, 1st Earl of Powis (see below for further history of the barony and Earl of Powis for earlier history of the Clive family). The sixth Earl was succeeded in the earldom by his uncle, Andrew, the seventh Earl. The seventh Earl died unmarried and was succeeded by his younger brother, Henry, the eighth Earl. The eighth Earl was childless and on his death in 1843 the earldom became extinct. The barony of Windsor remained in abeyance until 1855 when the abeyance was terminated in favour of Lady Harriet Windsor-(Clive), who became the thirteenth Baroness. The same year she re-assumed by Royal licence her maiden surname, as a first barrel of her name. Her eldest son Robert Windsor-Clive predeceased her and she was succeeded by her grandson, Robert, the fourteenth Baron, who was a prominent Conservative politician and held office as Paymaster General and First Commissioner of Works.

In 1905 the earldom of Plymouth was revived in the third creation when Robert was created Viscount Windsor, of St Fagans in the County of Glamorgan, and Earl of Plymouth, in the County of Devon. These titles were in the Peerage of the United Kingdom. The first Earl was succeeded by his second and only surviving son, Ivor, the second Earl, who was also a Conservative politician and served as Captain of the Honourable Corps of Gentlemen-at-Arms, Under-Secretary of State for Dominion Affairs, Under-Secretary of State for the Colonies and Under-Secretary of State for Foreign Affairs. Ivor's eldest son, Other, the third Earl, succeeded in 1943 and died on 7 March 2018 when he was succeeded by his own son, Ivor, the present fourth Earl. As a male-line descendant of the first Earl of Powis in its present creation the Earl is a far heir-in-remainder to that peerage and its subsidiary titles.

Another member of the family was Thomas Windsor, younger son of Thomas Hickman-Windsor, 1st Earl of Plymouth, who was elevated to the new title Viscount Windsor in 1699. After the death of his son, the second Viscount, the title was extinct for 38 years from 1758. However his daughter and heiress, Charlotte Jane, married John Stuart, 4th Earl of Bute, and the title "of" Windsor was revived in 1796 (Earl of Windsor) as a (courtesy) style for the Marquess of Bute (the first subsidiary title is Earl of Dumfries since 1803 when this title, created in 1633, was inherited by the second Marquess).

The family seat was Hewell Grange, Worcestershire. Later residences are Oakly Park, Bromfield near Ludlow, Shropshire, and a house in London W8.

'Other' (pronounced ǒðer), a customary male forename for Earls of Plymouth, derives from medieval writings of earlier oral traditions regarding a Saxon ancestor 'Otho' or 'Othere' of the Hickman-Windsor family.

== Earl of Plymouth, first creation (1675) ==
- Charles FitzCharles, 1st Earl of Plymouth (1657–1680)

== Earl of Plymouth, second and third creations ==
=== Baron Windsor (1529) ===
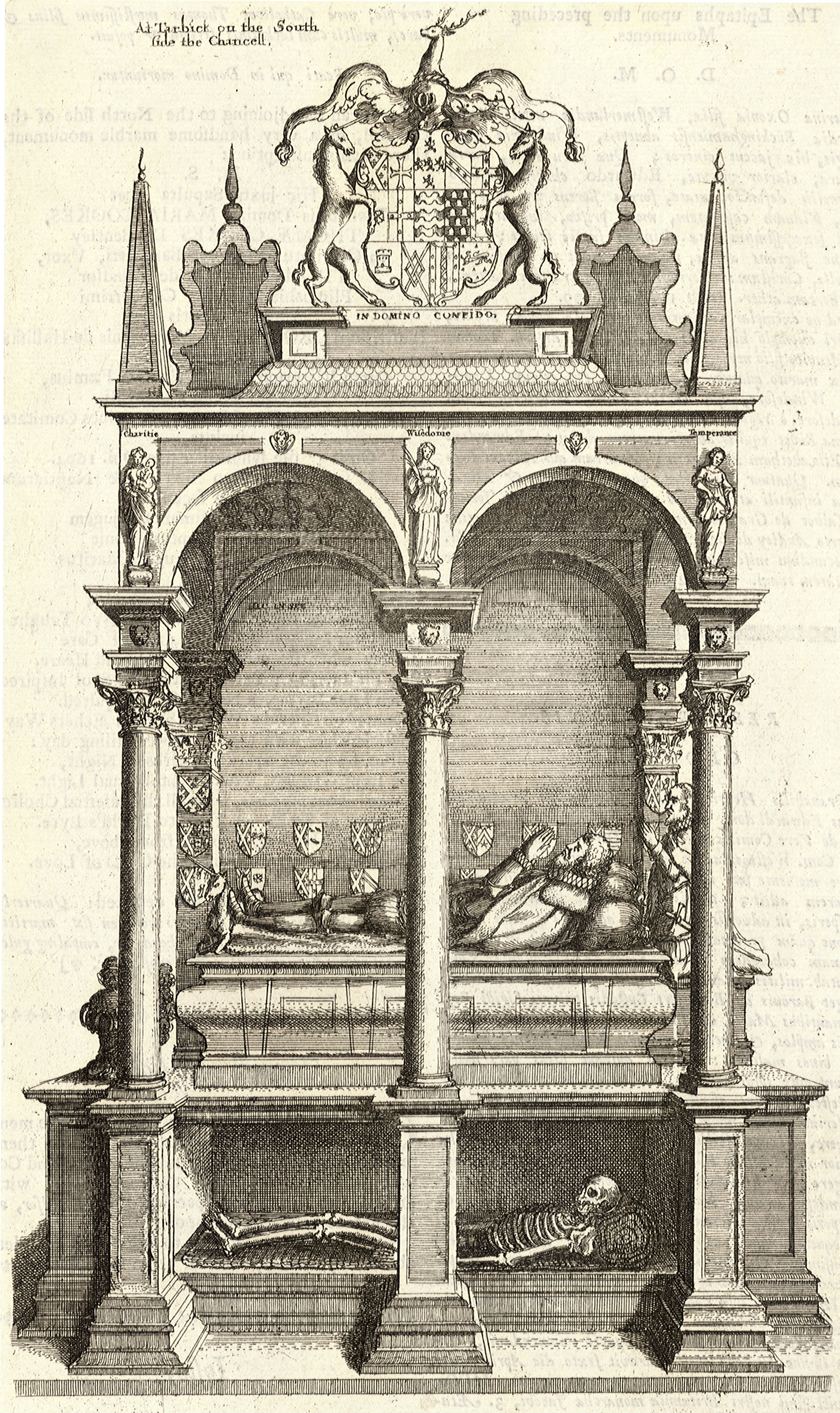
Monument (now lost) to Henry Windsor, 5th Baron Windsor (1562–1605), St Bartholomew's Church, Tardebigge, Worcestershire

- Andrew Windsor, 1st Baron Windsor (1467–1543)
- William Windsor, 2nd Baron Windsor (1498–1558)
- Edward Windsor, 3rd Baron Windsor (1532–1574)
- Frederick Windsor, 4th Baron Windsor (1559–1585)
- Henry Windsor, 5th Baron Windsor (1562–1605)
- Thomas Windsor, 6th Baron Windsor (1591–1642) (abeyant)
- Thomas Hickman-Windsor, 7th Baron Windsor (1627–1687) (abeyance terminated 1660, created Earl of Plymouth in 1682)

=== Earl of Plymouth (1682, second creation) ===
- Thomas Hickman-Windsor, 1st Earl of Plymouth (1627–1687)
  - Other Windsor, Lord Windsor (1659–1694)
- Other Windsor, 2nd Earl of Plymouth (1679–1727)
- Other Windsor, 3rd Earl of Plymouth (1707–1732)
- Other Lewis Windsor, 4th Earl of Plymouth (1731–1771)
- Other Hickman Windsor, 5th Earl of Plymouth (1751–1799)
- Other Archer Windsor, 6th Earl of Plymouth (1789–1833) (barony of Windsor abeyant 1833–1855)
- Andrew Windsor, 7th Earl of Plymouth (1764–1837)
- Henry Windsor, 8th Earl of Plymouth (1768–1843)

=== Baron Windsor (1529; reverted) ===
- Harriet Windsor, 13th Baroness Windsor (1797–1869) (abeyance terminated 1855)
  - Robert Windsor-Clive (1824–1859)
- Robert George Windsor-Clive, 14th Baron Windsor (1857–1923) (created Earl of Plymouth in 1905)

=== Earl of Plymouth (1905, third creation) ===
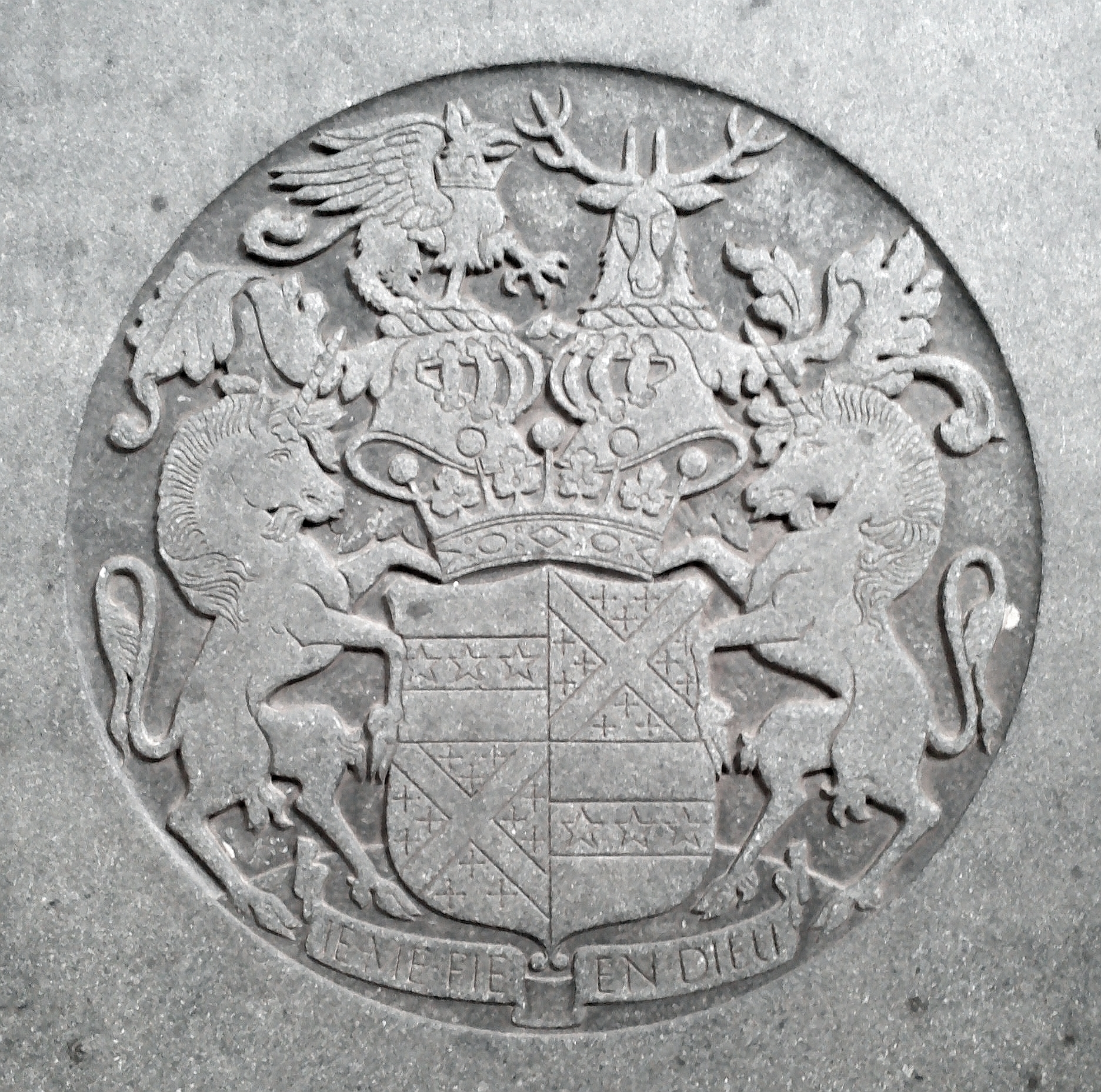
Arms of Robert Windsor-Clive, 1st Earl of Plymouth (1857–1923)

- Robert George Windsor-Clive, 1st Earl of Plymouth (1857–1923)
  - Other Robert Windsor-Clive, Viscount Windsor (1884–1908)
- Ivor Miles Windsor-Clive, 2nd Earl of Plymouth (1889–1943)
- Other Robert Ivor Windsor-Clive, 3rd Earl of Plymouth (1923–2018)
- Ivor Edward Other Windsor-Clive, 4th Earl of Plymouth (born 1951)

=== Present peer ===
Ivor Edward Other Windsor-Clive, 4th Earl of Plymouth (born 19 November 1951), is the eldest son of the 3rd Earl and his wife Caroline Helen Rice. He has a sister, Lady Emma (born 1954), and two brothers, Simon Percy (born 1956) and David Justin (born 1960). Known as Viscount Windsor from birth, he was educated at Harrow School and the Royal Agricultural College, Cirencester. In 1973 he was co-founder of the Centre for Modern Art and was its director until 1976. In 2003 he lived at 6 Oakley Street, Chelsea, London. On 7 March 2018 he succeeded his father to the peerages.

On 6 July 1979, as Lord Windsor, he married Caroline Anne Nettlefold, daughter of Frederick Nettleford and Juliana Eveline Curzon, a daughter of Richard Curzon, 2nd Viscount Scarsdale.

- Robert Other Ivor Windsor-Clive, Viscount Windsor (born 1981), heir apparent, whose heir is his son Edward Other Ivor Llewellyn Windsor-Clive (born 2019)
- Frederick John Richard Windsor-Clive (born 1983)
- Lady India Windsor-Clive (born 1988)
- Edward James Archer Windsor-Clive (born 1994)

Line of succession (simplified)
- Ivor Windsor-Clive, 2nd Earl of Plymouth (1889–1943)
  - Other Windsor-Clive, 3rd Earl of Plymouth (1923–2018)
    - Ivor Edward Other Windsor-Clive, 4th Earl of Plymouth (born 1951)
      - (1). Robert Other Ivor Windsor-Clive, Viscount Windsor (born 1981)
        - (2). Edward Other Ivor Llewellyn Windsor-Clive (born 2019)
      - (3). Frederick John Richard Windsor-Clive (born 1983)
      - (4). Edward Thomas A. Windsor-Clive (born 1994)
    - (5). Simon Percy Windsor-Clive (born 1956)
    - (6). David Justin Windsor-Clive (born 1960)
      - (7). James Other Windsor-Clive (born 1991)
      - (8). Alexander Miles Windsor-Clive (born 1993)
  - Richard Archer Alan Windsor-Clive (1928–2014)
    - male issue in remainder

There are further heirs in remainder to the barony of Windsor descended through the female lines of descent from the 2nd earl, and in female lines of descent from the 13th baroness.

=== Title succession chart ===
Title succession chart, Barons Windsor, Viscounts Windsor (both creations) and Earls of Plymouth (second and third creations)

Baron Windsor, 1529
Andrew Windsor; 1st Baron Windsor; 1467–1543
William Windsor; 1498–1558; 2nd Baron Windsor
Edward Windsor; 3rd Baron Windsor; 1532–1574
Frederick Windsor; 1559–1585; 4th Baron Windsor	Henry Windsor; 1562–1605; 5th Baron Windsor
Thomas Windsor; 1591–1641; 6th Baron Windsor	Elizabeth Windsor	Dixie Hickman
Barony Windsor in abeyance, 1641
Barony Windsor abeyance terminated, 1660; Earl of Plymouth (2nd creation), 1682
Thomas Hickman-Windsor; 1627–1687; 1st Earl of Plymouth, 7th Baron Windsor
Viscount Windsor (1st creation: Ireland), 1699; Baron Mountjoy (3rd creation: Great Britain), 1712
Other Windsor; 1659–1684	Thomas Windsor; 1669–1738; 1st Viscount Windsor, etc.	Dixey Windsor; 1672–1743	Andrews Windsor; 1678–1765	William Windsor; 1681/82–1682
Other Windsor; 1679–1727; 2nd Earl of Plymouth, 8th Baron Windsor	Thomas Windsor b. 1706	Herbert Windsor; 1707–1758; 2nd Viscount Windsor, etc.
Viscountcy and barony extinct
Other Windsor; 1707–1732; 3rd Earl of Plymouth, 9th Baron Windsor
Other Lewis Windsor; 1731–1774; 4th Earl of Plymouth, 10th Baron Windsor
Other Hickman Windsor; 1751–1799; 5th Earl of Plymouth, 11th Baron Windsor	Thomas Windsor; 1752–1832	Andrew Windsor; 1764–1837; 7th Earl of Plymouth, 13th Baron Windsor	Henry Windsor; 1768–1843; 8th Earl of Plymouth, 14th Baron Windsor
Earldom extinct
Barony Windsor abeyance terminated, 1855
Other Archer Windsor; 1789–1833; 6th Earl of Plymouth, 12th Baron Windsor	Harriet Windsor-Clive; 1797–1869; 13th Baroness Windsor	Robert Henry Clive; 1789–1854
Barony Windsor in abeyance
Robert Windsor-Clive; 1824–1859
Earl of Plymouth (3rd creation) and Viscount Windsor (2nd creation: United Kingdom), 1905
Robert George Windsor-Clive; 1857–1923; 1st Earl of Plymouth, etc., 14th Baron Windsor
Other Windsor-Clive; Viscount Windsor; 1884–1908	Ivor Miles Windsor-Clive; 1889–1943; 2nd Earl of Plymouth, etc., 15th Baron Windsor
Other Robert Ivor Windsor-Clive; 1923–2018; 3rd Earl of Plymouth, etc., 16th Baron Windsor
Ivor Edward Other Windsor-Clive b. 1951; 4th Earl of Plymouth, etc., 17th Baron Windsor
Robert Other Ivor Windsor-Clive b. 1981 styled Viscount Windsor
Edward Other Windsor-Clive b. 2019

== Seat and published probate wealth ==
The second earl died, seized of St Fagans Castle, in 1943. His probate was sworn the next year at £1,204,429 (equivalent to about £47,500,000 in 2025). The castle was gifted to the National Museum of Wales, becoming one of its key sites from his wife's death in 1947 (leading to his double probate) whereby the total assets amounted to £1,824,359 (equivalent to about £71,900,000 in 2025).

== See also ==
- Viscount Windsor
- Earl of Powis (1804 creation)
- Marquess of Bute
- Hewell Grange
- Barnt Green House
- St Fagans Castle
- Oakly Park, Shropshire
