= Robert Windsor-Clive, 1st Earl of Plymouth =

British Earl (1857–1923)

The Right Honourable The Earl of Plymouth GBE CB PC
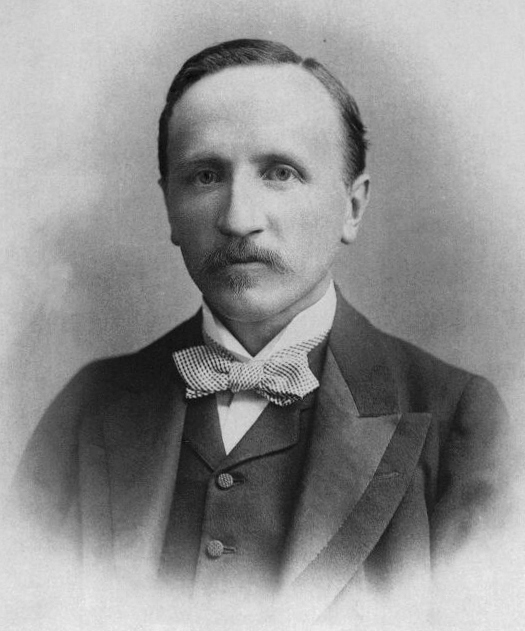

Paymaster General
- In office December 1890 – 11 August 1892
- Monarch: Queen Victoria
- Prime Minister: The Marquess of Salisbury
- Preceded by: The Earl of Jersey
- Succeeded by: Charles Seale-Hayne

First Commissioner of Works
- In office 11 August 1902 – 4 December 1905
- Monarch: Edward VII
- Prime Minister: Arthur Balfour
- Preceded by: Aretas Akers-Douglas
- Succeeded by: Lewis Harcourt

Personal details
- Born: 27 August 1857
- Died: 6 March 1923 (aged 65)
- Party: Conservative
- Spouse: Alberta Paget (1863–1944) (m. 1883)
- Parents: Robert Windsor-Clive (father); Lady Mary Selina Louisa Bridgeman (mother)
- Relatives: George Bridgeman (maternal grandfather)

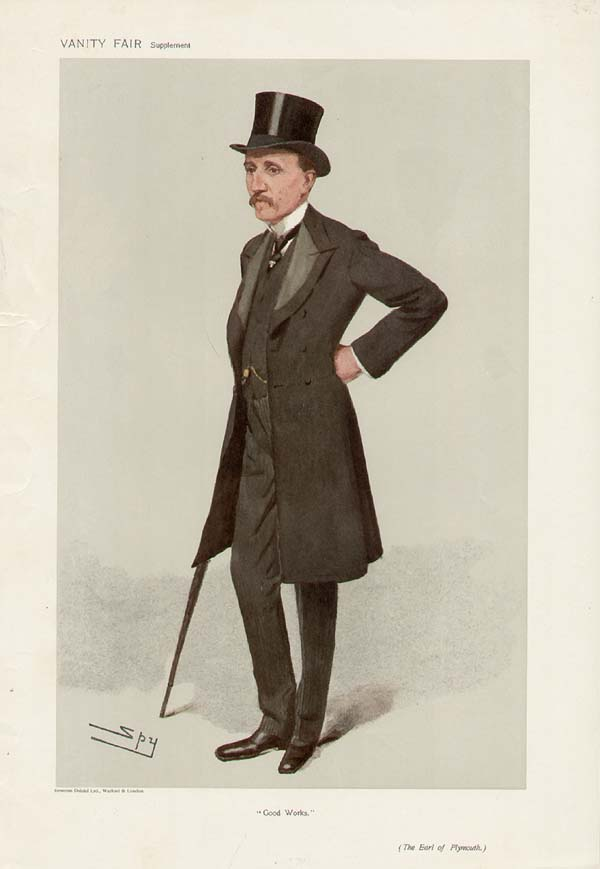
"Good Works". Caricature by "Spy" (Leslie Ward) published in Vanity Fair in 1906.

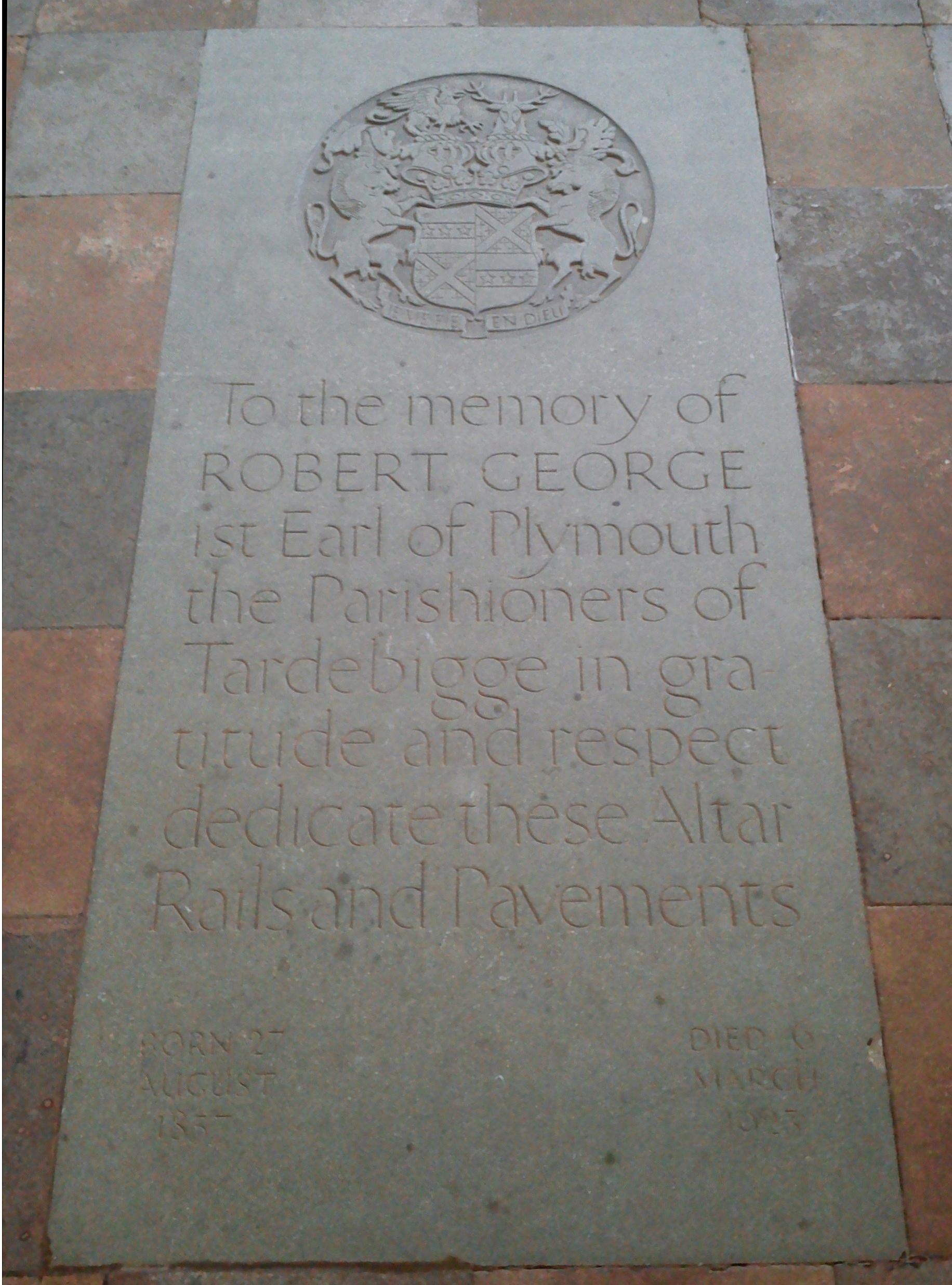
Memorial to the 1st Earl of Plymouth at St Bartholomew's church, Tardebigge.

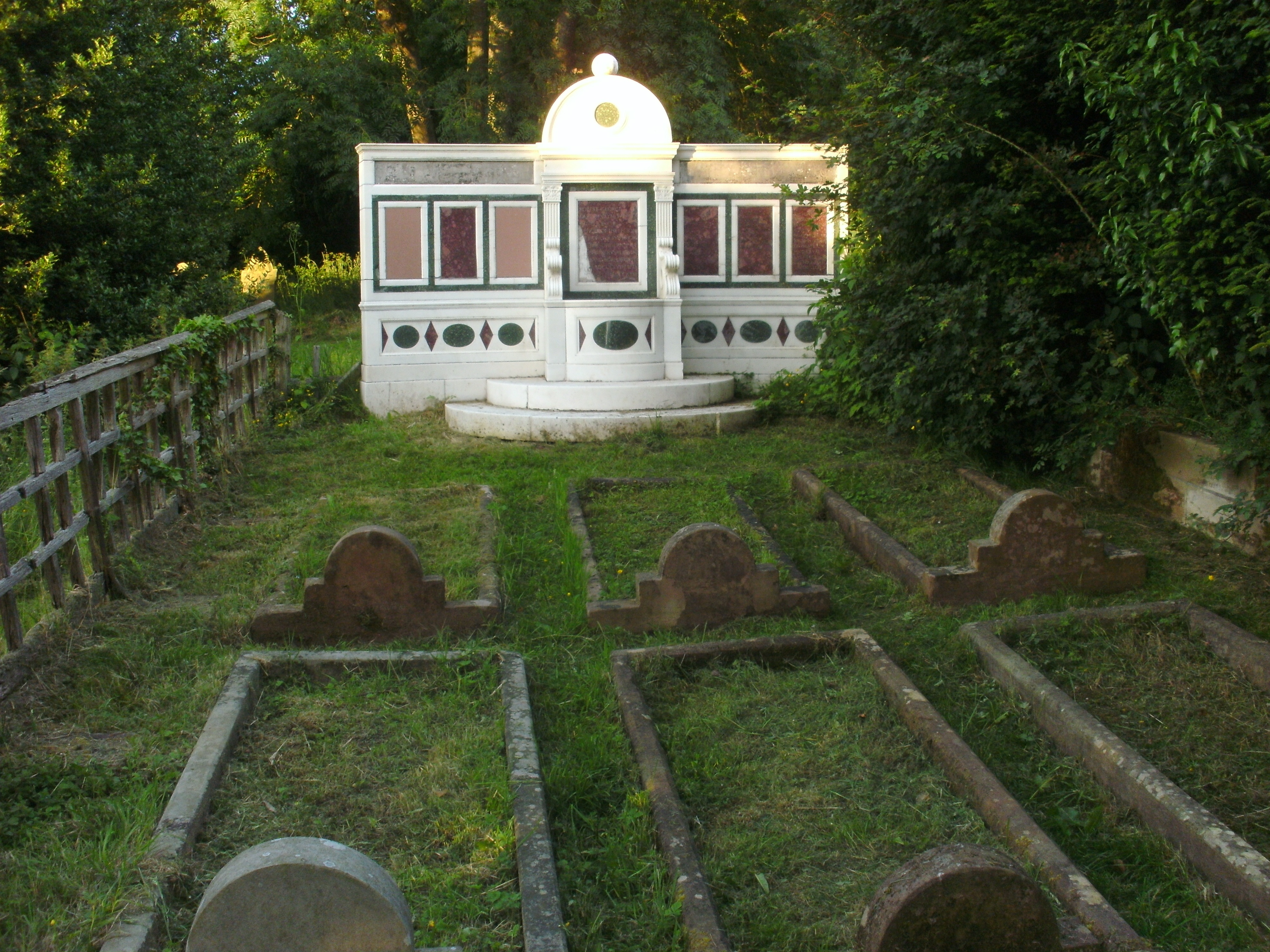
Windsor-Clive family plot in the cemetery of St Bartholomew's church, Tardebigge, Worcestershire. Robert Windsor-Clive, 1st Earl of Plymouth, GBE, CB, PC (1857–1923), and his family are buried here.

Robert George Windsor-Clive, 1st Earl of Plymouth (27 August 1857 – 6 March 1923), known as the 14th Baron Windsor between 1869 and 1905, was a British nobleman and Conservative politician. He was the founding President of the London Society.

== Background ==
Plymouth was born at John Street, Berkeley Square, London, the son of the Hon. Robert Windsor-Clive and Lady Mary Selina Louisa Bridgeman, daughter of George Bridgeman, 2nd Earl of Bradford. His paternal grandparents were the Hon. Robert Clive and Harriett, 13th Baroness Windsor, daughter of Other Windsor, 5th Earl of Plymouth. In 1869 he succeeded his grandmother in the barony of Windsor. He was educated at Eton College and admitted to St John's College, Cambridge, in 1875. He graduated with a B.A. in 1878, a M.A. in 1891, and was awarded an honorary LL.D by the university in 1900.

== Landowner ==
As Lord Windsor he commissioned Bodley and Garner to build a new country house at his estate in Hewell Grange near Tardebigge, Worcestershire, which was completed in 1884–1891. The estate had been a seat of his grandmother's Windsor family since the 16th century. There are several ruins of earlier houses on the estate, and a large number of listed buildings, structures and statues.

The Windsor-Clives also lived at St Fagans Castle near Cardiff, mainly during the summer months. The sixteenth-century house is now part of the National Museum of Wales, to which it was donated following the death of the 2nd Earl, and is furnished and decorated as it would have been during their residence.

== Political career ==
As Lord Windsor he served under Lord Salisbury as Paymaster General between 1890 and 1892 and was sworn of the Privy Council in 1891. Under Arthur Balfour he was First Commissioner of Works between 11 August 1902 and the Liberal election in 1905, during which period he was responsible for the transformation of The Mall into a processional carriageway and passed the plans for the Queen Victoria Memorial outside Buckingham Palace.

In 1905 the earldom of Plymouth held by his great-grandfather (which had become extinct in 1843) was revived when he was created Viscount Windsor, of St Fagans in the County of Glamorgan, and Earl of Plymouth, in the County of Devon.

Apart from his career in national politics he was Mayor of Cardiff from 1895 to 1896 in which role he hosted a royal visit from the Prince and Princess of Wales and their daughters, Princesses Victoria and Maud. He was appointed a Companion of the Order of the Bath in 1905 and a Knight Grand Cross of the Order of the British Empire in 1918, as well as an Officer of the French Legion of Honour and was at one time Chairman of the Union of Conservative Associations.

== Other public appointments ==
Lord Plymouth was also Lord Lieutenant of Glamorganshire from 1890 to his death, and High Steward of Cambridge University from 1919.

Lord Plymouth served in the Worcestershire Yeomanry, being commissioned 2nd Lieutenant in 1878, and promoted Lieutenant (1880) and Major (1885), and was its Lieutenant-Colonel commanding from 1893 to 1906. He was also Honorary Colonel of the 2nd Glamorganshire Artillery Volunteers from 1890, the 2nd Volunteer Battalion, later redesignated 8th Battalion, of the Worcestershire Regiment from 1891, and the Glamorganshire Yeomanry from 1901 to his death, as well as of the 3rd (Royal Glamorgan Militia) Battalion, Welsh Regiment from 1896 and its Special Reserve successor the 3rd (Reserve) Battalion, Welsh Regiment, from 1908.

He was Sub-Prior Order of St John of Jerusalem. In February 1900 he was appointed a Trustee of the National Gallery, and he served as the first President of The Concrete Institute (now the Institution of Structural Engineers) between 1908 and 1910. In 1913 he was responsible for purchasing The Crystal Palace for the nation. He served twice as President of the Cambrian Archaeological Society, first in 1899, and again in 1912.

In 1913 Lord Plymouth hosted the Duke and Duchess of Argyll (sister of the late King Edward VII) at his Worcestershire seat, Hewell Grange. On 23 April 1913, he accompanied the Duke and Duchess to Birmingham. There, he opened the King Edward VII Memorial Hospital in Ladywood and then unveiled the statue to King Edward VII in Victoria Square, Birmingham. In 1918 he became the first President of the newly formed Birmingham Civic Society.

From 1914 to 1923, Lord Plymouth was chairman of the National Trust.

== Philanthropy ==
In 1911 Lord Plymouth bought London's Crystal Palace, which had fallen into disrepair and bankruptcy, for £230,000 (equivalent to £23,423,662 in 2025) to save it from property developers with the understanding that a fund raised by the Lord Mayor of London would reimburse him. The mayor announced in 1913 that £90,000 was still required in addition to the money already raised by local authorities. The Times held an appeal, and the amount was raised in 13 days; £30,000 was contributed by an unknown individual. Camberwell Borough Council refused to contribute and Penge Urban District Council reduced their contribution from £20,000 to £5,000. Lord Plymouth made up the resulting deficit of some £30,000.

== Family ==
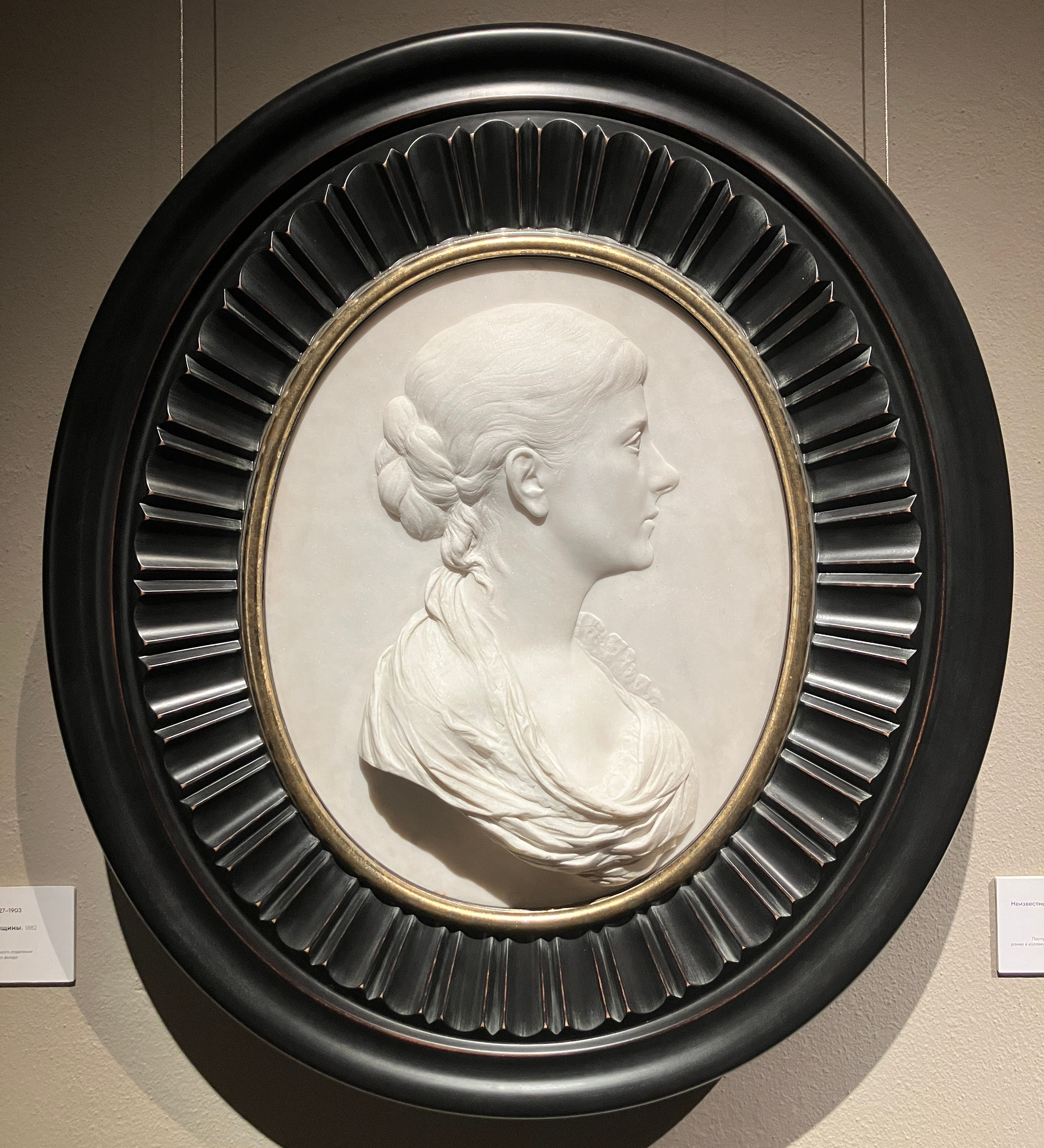
Portrait of a wife before marriage, Alberta Victoria Sarah Caroline Paget by Joseph von Kopf. 1882. Museum named after M. A. Vrubel

In 1883, Lord Plymouth married Alberta Victoria Sarah Caroline, who was the daughter of Sir Augustus Paget, and born in 1863. They had three sons and one daughter. His eldest son Other Robert Windsor-Clive, Viscount Windsor (1884–1908), predeceased him, as did his third son, Lieutenant Archer Windsor-Clive, of the 3rd Battalion Coldstream Guards, killed in action at Landrecies holding the line during the Retreat from Mons;. Archer had briefly played cricket for Glamorgan.

Lord Plymouth died suddenly in March 1923, aged 65, at his home in Great Cumberland Place, London, and was buried at Tardebigge, Worcestershire. He was succeeded in the earldom by his second son, Ivor. The Countess of Plymouth died in August 1944, aged 81, and was buried next to her husband and their son Other Robert (1884–1908).

Political offices
Preceded by The Earl of Jersey	Paymaster General; 1890–1892	Succeeded by Charles Seale-Hayne
Preceded by Aretas Akers-Douglas	First Commissioner of Works; 1902–1905	Succeeded by Lewis Harcourt
Party political offices
Preceded by Gerald Loder	Chairman of the National Union of Conservative and Constitutional Associations; 1901	Succeeded by Alfred Hickman
Honorary titles
Preceded by Christopher Rice Mansel Talbot	Lord Lieutenant of Glamorganshire; 1890–1923	Succeeded by The Earl of Plymouth
Peerage of the United Kingdom
New creation	Earl of Plymouth; 3rd creation 1905–1923	Succeeded by Ivor Windsor-Clive
New creation	Viscount Windsor; 2nd creation 1905–1923	Succeeded by Ivor Windsor-Clive
Peerage of England
Preceded by Harriet Windsor	Baron Windsor; 1869–1923; Member of the House of Lords (1869–1923)	Succeeded by Ivor Windsor-Clive
