= 1922 Ludlow by-election =

UK Parliamentary by-election

The 1922 Ludlow by-election was held on 4 January 1922. The by-election was held due to the death of the incumbent Coalition Conservative MP, Beville Stanier. It was won by the Coalition Conservative candidate, Ivor Windsor-Clive.

== Result ==
Ludlow by-election, 1922
Party		Candidate	Votes	%	±%
C	Unionist	Ivor Windsor-Clive	Unopposed		
	Unionist hold				
C indicates candidate endorsed by the coalition government.
