= Billingbear =

Hamlet in Berkshire, England

Coordinates: 51.437605°N 0.807905°W

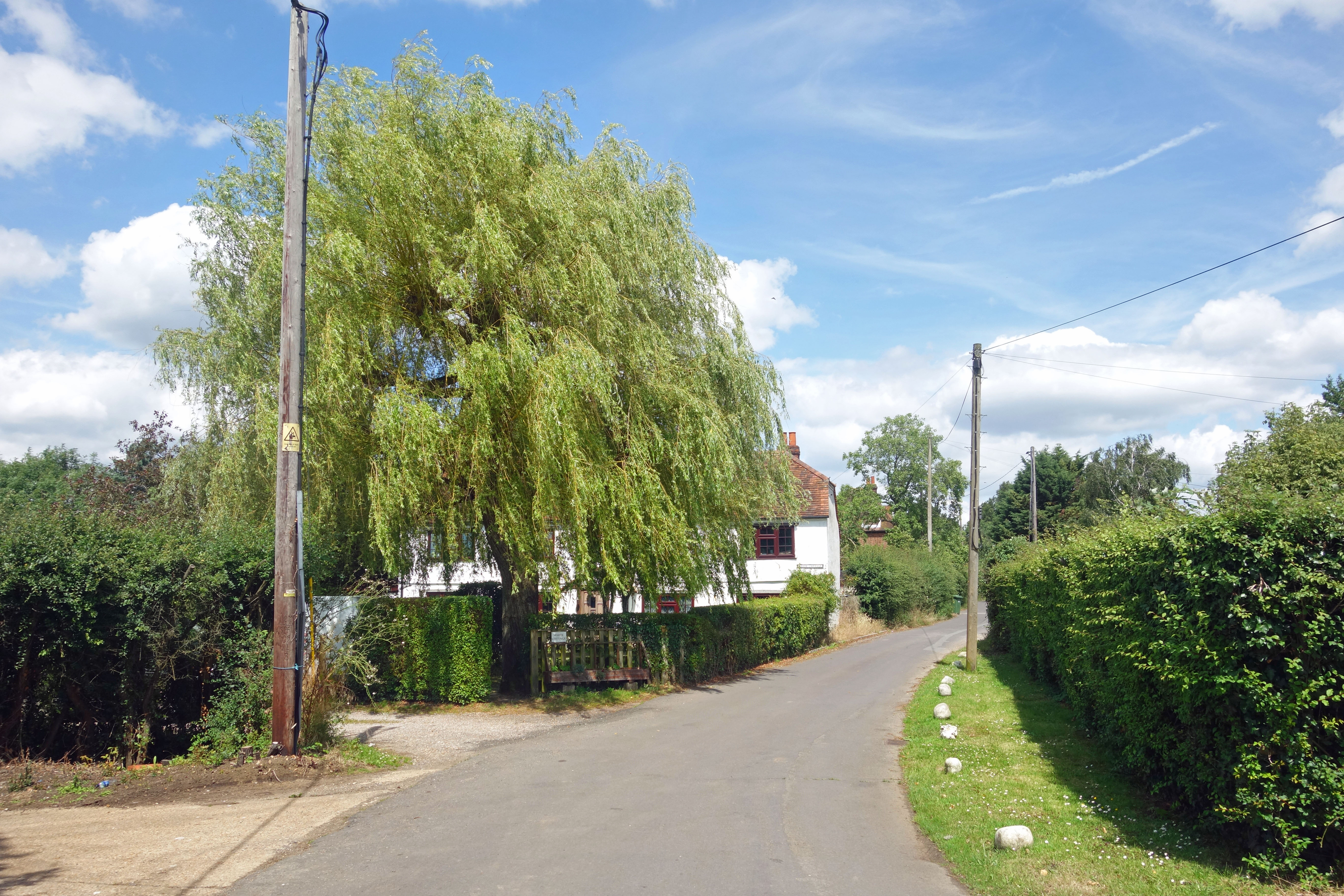
- Billingbear Lane

- Location within Berkshire
- OS grid reference: SU838724
- Metropolitan borough: Bracknell Forest
- Metropolitan county: Berkshire
- Region: South East
- Country: England
- Sovereign state: United Kingdom
- Post town: READING
- Postcode district: RG40
- Dialling code: 01344
- Police: Thames Valley
- Fire: Royal Berkshire
- Ambulance: South Central
- UK Parliament: Bracknell

Billingbear is a hamlet in the civil parish of Binfield and a former country estate in the civil parish of Waltham St Lawrence, near Bracknell, in the English county of Berkshire.

== Geography ==
The settlement lies between the M4 motorway and the village of Binfield, just north-west of Binfield Parish Church, along Carters Hill and Billingbear Lane. The country estate is immediately to the west.

== Billingbear Park ==
Billingbear Park is now the site of a large late 20th century country house and a golf course. It was previously a large area of parkland surrounding Billingbear House, a huge Elizabethan mansion erected in 1567 by Henry Neville (d. 1593). It burnt down in 1924.

== Allanbay Park ==
Just north-east of the hamlet is Allanbay Park, a grade II listed country house set in parkland. It was the home of John Lycett Wills (1910–1999) and his wife Jean Elphinstone. Wills served as High Sheriff of Berkshire in 1958. Jean was a niece of Queen Elizabeth the Queen Mother, and lady-in-waiting to her cousin, Princess Margaret, Countess of Snowdon. In 1955, Group Captain Peter Townsend stayed at Allanbay to avoid the press furore surrounding his relationship with the Princess.
