= Ivor Windsor-Clive, 2nd Earl of Plymouth =

English nobleman and Conservative politician

The Right Honourable The Earl of Plymouth GCStJ PC
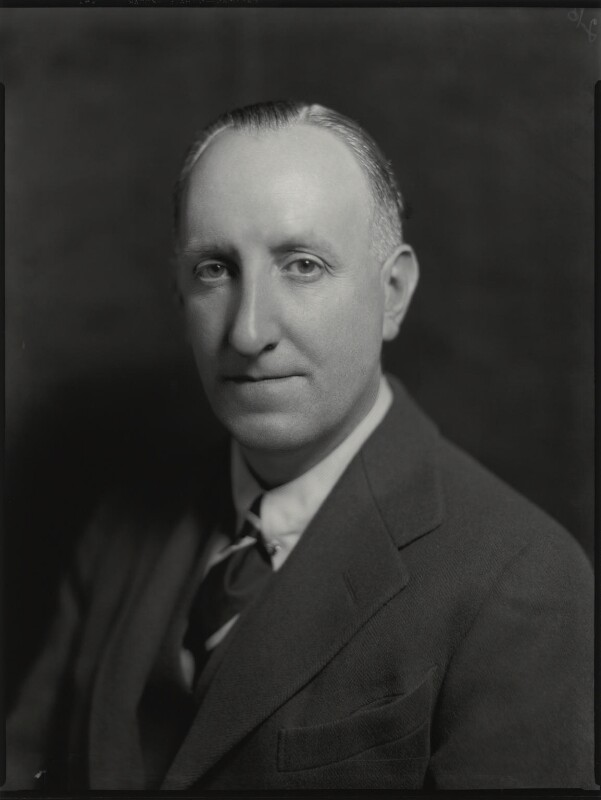

Member of the House of Lords
- Lord Temporal
- In office 6 March 1923 – 1 October 1943
- Preceded by: The 1st Earl of Plymouth
- Succeeded by: The 3rd Earl of Plymouth

Parliamentary Under-Secretary of State for Foreign Affairs
- In office 1936–1939
- Preceded by: The Earl Stanhope
- Succeeded by: Rab Butler

Under-Secretary of State for the Colonies
- In office 1932–1936
- Preceded by: Robert Hamilton
- Succeeded by: The Earl De La Warr

Member of Parliament for Ludlow
- In office 4 January 1922 – 6 March 1923
- Preceded by: Sir Beville Stanier
- Succeeded by: George Windsor-Clive

Personal details
- Born: 2 February 1889
- Died: 1 October 1943 (aged 54)
- Spouse: Lady Irene Corona Charteris (m. 1921)
- Children: 6, including the 3rd Earl of Plymouth
- Parent(s): Lady Alberta Victoria Paget; The 1st Earl of Plymouth
- Education: Eton College
- Alma mater: Trinity College, Cambridge
- Other titles: 2nd Viscount Windsor; 15th Baron Windsor

Ivor Miles Windsor-Clive, 2nd Earl of Plymouth, GCStJ, PC (4 February 1889 – 1 October 1943), was an English nobleman and Conservative Party politician.

== Early life ==
Ivor Windsor-Clive was born on 4 February 1889. He was the second, and only surviving, son of the Alberta Victoria Sarah Caroline (née Paget) Windsor-Clive and Robert Windsor-Clive, 1st Earl of Plymouth (1857–1923). He was educated at Eton College and Trinity College, Cambridge. Until succeeding his father in 1923, he used his father's subsidiary title Viscount Windsor.

His paternal grandfather was Robert Windsor-Clive, himself the son of Harriet Windsor-Clive, 13th Baroness Windsor. Ivor's mother was the daughter of Sir Augustus Paget, the British Ambassador to Austria-Hungary, and descended from the Earls of Uxbridge.

== Career ==
He was member for West St Pancras on London County Council from 1913 to 1919, and was elected as Conservative Member of Parliament (MP) for Ludlow, Shropshire at a by-election in January 1922, holding the seat until he succeeded his father in March 1923. He held office as Captain of the Gentlemen-at-Arms from 1925 to 1929, Parliamentary Under-Secretary of State for Dominion Affairs from January–June 1929, Parliamentary Secretary to the Ministry of Transport from 1931 to 1932, Under-Secretary of State for the Colonies from 1932 to 1936, and as Parliamentary Under-Secretary of State for Foreign Affairs from 1936 to 1939.

He is probably best known for his work as co-chairman of the International Committee for Non-Intervention in the Spanish Civil War.

He was appointed Lord Lieutenant of Glamorgan in 1923, and a Privy Counsellor in the 1929 Dissolution Honours. He was made an Honorary freedom of Cardiff in 1936, served as the charter mayor of the Borough of Barry in 1939, President of the National Museum of Wales and as Pro-Chancellor of the University of Wales 1941. He was appointed Sub-Prior of the Order of St John of Jerusalem in 1943.

On 12 March 1924 he was appointed Honorary Colonel of the Glamorgan Coast Regiment, Royal Artillery; his father had held the same position with its Victorian predecessor unit.

Lord Plymouth was Chairman of the Royal Commission for Ancient and Historical Monuments in the Principality.

== Personal life ==
On 14 July 1921, he was married to Lady Irene Corona Charteris (1902–1989), the third daughter of Hugo Charteris, 11th Earl of Wemyss, and Mary Constance Wyndham, herself one of the three famous Wyndham sisters, all daughters of Percy Wyndham. Together, Ivor and Irene were the parents of:

- Lady Gillian Mary Windsor-Clive (1922–1961), who married Wilfred Wooller (1912–1997) in 1941. They divorced in 1947, and that same year married Albertus Jacobus de Haan (died 1991).
- Other Robert Ivor Windsor-Clive, 3rd Earl of Plymouth (1923–2018), who married Caroline Helen Rice (1931–2016), granddaughter of Grace Curzon, Marchioness Curzon of Kedleston, in 1950.
- Hon. Richard Archer Alan Windsor-Clive (1928–2014), who married Joanna Mary Woodall, daughter of Edward Corbet Woodall, in 1955. They divorced in 1968 and that same year he married Mary Alice (née Jolliffe) Chancellor (mother of Anna Chancellor), only daughter of William Jolliffe, 4th Baron Hylton. They divorced in 1997.
- Lady Clarissa Windsor-Clive (born 1931), who married Keith Maclean Forbes Egleston in 1953.
- Lady Rosula Caroline Windsor-Clive (1935–2005), who married Sir Alan Glyn (1918–1998), a Member of Parliament for Clapham, Windsor and Maidenhead, in 1962.
- Hon. Rowland David Owain Windsor-Clive (1938–1965).

The 2nd Earl of Plymouth died in 1943 aged 54 and was buried in the Windsor-Clive family plot at Tardebigge, Worcestershire. His wife Irene, who died in 1989, is buried next to him. Upon his death, his eldest son inherited an estate valued in excess of £30 million which included the Oakly Park estate near Ludlow in Shropshire, which was in excess of 7,500 acres.

=== Descendants ===
Through his son Other, he was the grandfather of Ivor Edward Other Windsor-Clive, 4th Earl of Plymouth (born 1951); Lady Emma Windsor-Clive; Hon. Simon Windsor-Clive and Hon. David Windsor-Clive.

Parliament of the United Kingdom
Preceded by Sir Beville Stanier	Member of Parliament for Ludlow; January 1922 – March 1923	Succeeded by George Windsor-Clive
Political offices
Preceded by Robert Hamilton	Under-Secretary of State for the Colonies; 1932–1936	Succeeded by The Earl De La Warr
Preceded by The Earl Stanhope	Parliamentary Under-Secretary of State for Foreign Affairs; 1936–1939; With: Viscount Cranborne 1936–1938; Rab Butler 1938–1939	Succeeded by Rab Butler
Preceded by The Earl of Clarendon	Captain of the Honourable Corps of Gentlemen-at-Arms; 1925–1929	Succeeded by The Earl of Lucan
Honorary titles
Preceded by The 1st Earl of Plymouth	Lord Lieutenant of Glamorgan; 1923–1943	Succeeded by Sir Gerard Bruce
Peerage of the United Kingdom
Preceded by Robert Windsor-Clive	Earl of Plymouth; 3rd creation 1923–1943; Member of the House of Lords (1923–1943)	Succeeded by Other Windsor-Clive
Preceded by Robert Windsor-Clive	Viscount Windsor; 2nd creation 1923–1943	Succeeded by Other Windsor-Clive
Peerage of England
Preceded by Robert Windsor-Clive	Baron Windsor; 1923–1943	Succeeded by Other Windsor-Clive
