= Otherness =

Otherness may refer to:

== Literature ==
- Otherness (book), an anthology of science fiction stories by David Brin
- Otherness (F. Paul Wilson), a malevolent force in several novels by F. Paul Wilson

== Music ==
- Otherness (EP), a 1995 EP by Scottish band Cocteau Twins
- Otherness (Kindness album), a 2014 album by English musician Kindness
- Otherness (Alexisonfire album), a 2022 album by Canadian band Alexisonfire

== Philosophy and sociology ==
- Alterity or otherness, the philosophical principle of exchanging one's perspective for that of the "other"
- Other (philosophy), where "Otherness" describes the qualities and characteristics attributed to individuals or groups perceived as outside the dominant social norm
- Otherness of childhood, the substantial differences between the lived worlds of children and adults
