= Other Windsor, 3rd Earl of Plymouth =

English peer and landowner

Other Windsor, 3rd Earl of Plymouth (30 June 1707 – 23 November 1732) was an English peer and landowner, a member of the House of Lords from 1728 until his death.

His first name goes back in the Windsor family to Other, or Othoere, the father of Walter Fitz Other, who was constable of Windsor Castle in the time of William the Conqueror.

The son of Other Windsor, 2nd Earl of Plymouth, and Elizabeth Whitley, he was educated at Eton College, where he was a contemporary of Henry Fielding, and succeeded his father as Earl of Plymouth and Baron Windsor on 26 December 1727, but had to wait until he was 21 to be admitted to the House of Lords.

On 7 May 1730 Plymouth married Elizabeth Lewis, a daughter of Thomas Lewis. He died in 1732, aged 25, and was succeeded by his only son, Other Lewis Windsor, 4th Earl of Plymouth (1731–1771).
