= Other Windsor-Clive, 3rd Earl of Plymouth =

British landowner, soldier, politician

The Right Honourable The Earl of Plymouth KStJ DL FRSA

Member of the House of Lords
- Lord Temporal
- as a hereditary peer 1 October 1943 – 11 November 1999
- Preceded by: The 2nd Earl of Plymouth
- Succeeded by: Seat abolished (Note: Under the House of Lords Act 1999.)

Personal details
- Born: Other Robert Ivor Windsor-Clive; 9 October 1923
- Died: 7 March 2018 (aged 94)
- Other titles: 3rd Viscount Windsor; 16th Baron Windsor

Other Robert Ivor Windsor-Clive, 3rd Earl of Plymouth (9 October 1923 – 7 March 2018), was a British landowner, soldier, businessman and member of the House of Lords from 1943 until 1999.

== Early life and education ==
Windsor-Clive was born in 1923, the son of Ivor Windsor-Clive, 2nd Earl of Plymouth, and his wife Lady Irene Corona Charteris, youngest daughter of Hugo Charteris, 11th Earl of Wemyss. His unusual first name goes back in the Windsor family to Other, or Othoere, the father of Walter FitzOther, who was castellan of Windsor in the time of William the Conqueror.

Windsor-Clive was educated at Eton College. On 1 October 1943, upon his father's death he succeeded as Earl of Plymouth, Viscount Windsor of St Fagans, and Baron Windsor, but was too young to immediately take his seat in the House of Lords.

== Military service ==
Windsor-Clive left school in 1941 and was commissioned into the Coldstream Guards, serving throughout the Second World War. He took part in the Normandy landings on D-Day, 6 June 1944, and rose to the rank of temporary captain.

== Later life ==
After the war, Lord Plymouth continued his interrupted education at Trinity College, Cambridge, graduating BA.

In 1953, Plymouth was appointed as a Fellow of the Royal Society of Arts (FRSA) and also as a Knight of the Most Venerable Order of the Hospital of St John of Jerusalem.

From 1960 to 1967 he was a Trustee of the National Gallery and in 1961 was appointed as a Deputy Lieutenant (DL) of Shropshire. From 1967 to 1972, he was President of the National Museum of Wales and from 1972 to 1982 sat on the Standing Commission on Museums and Galleries. He was Chairman of the Reviewing Committee for Works of Art between 1982 and 1985.

In 1999, Plymouth was one of the hereditary peers who ceased to be members of the House of Lords as a result of the House of Lords Act 1999. In more than fifty years as a member, he is not recorded in Hansard as having spoken.

== Marriage and children ==
On 11 October 1950 Plymouth married Caroline Helen Rice (1931–2016), daughter of Edward Denis Rice (1899–1973) and Grace Lucille Marcella Duggan (1907–1995), daughter of Alfredo Huberto Duggan (1875–1915) and his wife Grace (née Hinds), later Marchioness Curzon of Kedleston. They had four children:

- Ivor Edward Other Windsor-Clive, 4th Earl of Plymouth (born 19 November 1951), married Caroline Anne Nettlefold, daughter of Frederick Nettleford and Juliana Eveline Curzon, a daughter of Richard Curzon, 2nd Viscount Scarsdale.
- Lady Emma Windsor-Clive (born 13 February 1954)
- Hon. Simon Percy Windsor-Clive (born 19 November 1956)
- Hon. David Justin Windsor-Clive (born 4 September 1960)

== Death ==
Lord Plymouth died on 7 March 2018 at the age of 94. He was succeeded in the earldom and other peerages by his eldest son, Ivor.

== Notes ==
Peerage of the United Kingdom
Preceded by Ivor Windsor-Clive	Earl of Plymouth; 3rd creation 1943–2018; Member of the House of Lords (1943–1999)	Succeeded by Ivor Windsor-Clive
Preceded by Ivor Windsor-Clive	Viscount Windsor; 2nd creation 1943–2018	Succeeded by Ivor Windsor-Clive
Peerage of England
Preceded by Ivor Windsor-Clive	Baron Windsor; 1943–2018	Succeeded by Ivor Windsor-Clive
