= Thomas Hickman-Windsor, 1st Earl of Plymouth =

English nobleman and soldier (d. 1687)

Thomas Hickman-Windsor, 1st Earl of Plymouth, PC (c. 1627 – 3 November 1687), was the son of Dixie Hickman and his wife Elizabeth Windsor, sister and heiress of Thomas Windsor, 6th Baron Windsor. He assumed the additional surname of Windsor and succeeded to the Windsor family's estate around Hewell Grange near Redditch in 1645. The same year he distinguished himself in the Battle of Naseby. Hickman-Windsor impressed King Charles I by relieving his garrison at High Ercall.

Upon the Restoration, the title of Baron Windsor, which had last been held by his maternal uncle Thomas, was called out of abeyance in his favour, on 16 June 1660. From 1661 to 1663, he served as Governor of Jamaica. However, he actually spent only three months in Jamaica: according to Samuel Pepys his abrupt return to England caused a good deal of comment. The reason was apparently ill health. His one notable achievement as Governor had been to order the attack by Sir Christopher Myngs on Santiago de Cuba. The raid was a success, but caused a crisis in Anglo-Spanish relations, and was later disavowed by Charles II.

He acquired the Navigation of the Warwickshire Avon from James, Duke of York, and employed Andrew Yarranton to restore Pershore Sluice, thus restoring navigation from Tewkesbury to Evesham. He then sold two-thirds of the navigation above Evesham to Andrew Yarranton and others, who restored the navigation from there to Stratford-upon-Avon. He and George Digby, 2nd Earl of Bristol, financed Andrew Yarranton's ultimately unsuccessful attempts to improve the River Salwarpe and River Stour to make them navigable.

He was appointed Gentleman of the Bedchamber to Charles II; in that capacity, he was sent in September 1678 with a crucial message to Danby to investigate certain allegations made by Titus Oates and Israel Tonge, thus setting in motion the Popish Plot.

On 6 December 1682, Windsor was created the first Earl of Plymouth, a new creation with the previous title holder having been Charles II's natural son Charles FitzCharles, 1st Earl of Plymouth (1675–1680). He was succeeded by his grandson Other Windsor (his curious first name is a variant of Otho, a remote ancestor).

== Family ==
He married, firstly, Anne Savile, daughter of Sir William Savile, 3rd Baronet, and Anne Coventry, on 12 May 1656. They had three children:

- Lady Mary Windsor (died 1694)
- Other Windsor, Lord Windsor (1659–1684), father of Other Windsor, 2nd Earl of Plymouth
- Ann Windsor (died in infancy)

On 9 April 1668, he married, secondly, Ursula Widdrington, daughter of Sir Thomas Widdrington and Frances Fairfax. They had six children:

- Dixie Windsor (died 1743)
- William Windsor (died 1682)
- Andrews Windsor (1678–1765), to whom his father gave the Upper Avon Navigation
- Lady Ursula Windsor (died 1737)
- Lady Elizabeth Windsor (died 1736), who married, as his fourth wife, Sir Francis Dashwood, 1st Baronet.
- Thomas Windsor, 1st Viscount Windsor (died 1738), to whom his father gave the Lower Avon Navigation

Honorary titles
Interregnum	Lord Lieutenant of Worcestershire; 1660–1662	Succeeded by The Earl of Southampton
Preceded by The Earl of Southampton	Lord Lieutenant of Worcestershire; 1663–1687	Succeeded by The Viscount Carrington
Military offices
Preceded by Edward D'Oyley	Governor of Jamaica; 1662	Succeeded by Charles Lyttleton as acting Deputy Governor of Jamaica
Preceded by The Earl of Mulgrave	Governor of Kingston-upon-Hull; 1682–1687	Succeeded by The Lord Langdale
New regiment	Colonel of the Earl of Plymouth's Regiment of Horse; 1685–1687	Succeeded by Sir John Fenwick, Bt.
Peerage of England
New creation	Earl of Plymouth; 2nd creation 1682–1687	Succeeded by Other Windsor
In abeyance Title last held by Thomas Windsor	Baron Windsor; 1660–1687	Succeeded by Other Windsor
