= Other Windsor, 2nd Earl of Plymouth =

British peer

Other Windsor, 2nd Earl of Plymouth (27 August 1679 – 26 December 1727) was a British peer, styled Lord Windsor from his father's death in 1684 to 1687. He was a Hanoverian Tory, supportive of the Hanoverian Succession.

The son of Other Windsor, Lord Windsor and Elizabeth Turvey, he succeeded his grandfather as Earl of Plymouth in 1687. His unusual first name is a variant of Otho. In 1701 he was one of five peers of the realm who formally entered a protest in the House of Lords Journal against the passing of the Act of Settlement, an act which confirmed the Stuarts' exclusion from the English throne. On 12 April 1706, he was awarded a DCL by Oxford University. He was a founding member of the Tory Loyal Brotherhood in 1709. He was appointed Custos Rotulorum of Worcestershire in 1710, and Lord Lieutenant of Cheshire and the counties of North Wales in 1713, but lost all his offices upon the accession of George I in 1714.

He married Elizabeth Whitley and had one child, Other Windsor, 3rd Earl of Plymouth.

Honorary titles
Preceded by The Earl of Coventry	Custos Rotulorum of Worcestershire; 1710–1714	Succeeded by The Lord Somers
Preceded by The 1st Earl of Cholmondeley	Lord Lieutenant of Cheshire and North Wales (Anglesey, Caernarvonshire, Denbighshire, Flintshire, Merionethshire and Montgomeryshire); 1713–1714	Succeeded by The 1st Earl of Cholmondeley
Peerage of England
Preceded by Thomas Hickman-Windsor	Earl of Plymouth; 1687–1727	Succeeded by Other Windsor
