= 1790s in Wales =

- 1780s | 1800s | Other years in Wales
- Other events of the decade

This article is about the particular significance of the decade 1790–1799 to Wales and its people.

== Events ==
- 1790
- 1791
- 1792
- 1793
- 1794
- 1795
- 1796
- 1797
- 1798
- 1799

== Arts and literature ==
=== New books ===
- 1790
  - Thomas Edwards (Twm o'r Nant) - Gardd o Gerddi
  - Thomas Pennant - Indian Zoology
  - Peter Williams - Tafol i Bwyso Sosiniaeth
- 1792
  - Hester Thrale - The Three Warnings
  - Nicholas Owen - Carnarvonshire, a Sketch of its History, etc.
- 1793
  - Edward Daniel Clarke - A Tour Through the South of England, Wales, and Part of Ireland, Made During the Summer of 1791
- 1794
  - Iolo Morganwg - Poems Lyric and Pastoral
  - Peter Williams -Gwreiddyn y Mater
- 1795
  - Thomas Evans (Tomos Glyn Cothi) - The Miscellaneous Repository neu Y Drysorfa Gymysgedig
  - John Jones (Jac Glan-y-gors) - Seren Tan Gwmmwl
- 1797
  - Edward Charles - Epistolau Cymraeg at y Cymry
  - John Jones (Jac Glan-y-gors) - Toriad y Dydd
  - Nathaniel Williams - Pregeth a Bregethwyd yn Llangloffan ar Neilltuad ... Joseph James a James Davies
- 1798
  - Thomas Roberts of Llwyn'rhudol - Cwyn yn erbyn Gorthrymder
  - Hester Thrale - Three Warnings to John Bull before he dies. By an Old Acquaintance of the Public
- 1799
  - Philip Yorke - The Royal Tribes of Wales

=== Music ===
- 1798
  - Edward Jones (Bardd y Brenin) - Popular Cheshire Melodies

== Births ==
- 1790
  - 27 January - William Davies Evans, chess player (d. 1872)
  - 11 August - William Probert, minister and author (d. 1870)
  - 16 September - Thomas Vowler Short, Bishop of St Asaph
  - 29 September - John Jones (printer) (d. 1855)
- 1791
  - date unknown - Robert Everett, Independent minister and writer (d. 1875)
- 1792
  - 23 July - Aneurin Owen, scholar (d. 1851)
  - 5 September - Sir David Davies, royal physician (d. 1865)
  - 20 December - David Griffiths, missionary (d. 1863)
  - date unknown - Sir Charles John Salusbury, Baronet (d. 1868)
- 1793
  - 17 January - Owen Owen Roberts, physician (d. 1866)
  - March - Lewis Lewis (Lewsyn yr Heliwr), political activist (date of death unknown)
  - 19 July - John Propert, physician (d. 1867)
  - 10 August - John Crichton-Stuart, 2nd Marquess of Bute (d. 1848)
  - 25 September - Felicia Hemans, poet (d. 1835)
- 1794
  - 7 May - Rees Howell Gronow, memoirist (d. 1865)
  - 3 November - David Thomas, industrialist (d. 1882)
  - date unknown
  - Evan Davies (Eta Delta), Independent minister (d. 1855)
  - Thomas Jenkyn, theologian (d. 1858)
- 1795
  - 13 January - Edward Lloyd-Mostyn, 2nd Baron Mostyn, politician (d. 1884)
  - 5 August - George Rice-Trevor, 4th Baron Dynevor, politician (d. 1869)
  - December - John Davies, philosopher (d. 1861)
  - 7 December - Samuel George Homfray, industrialist (d. 1882)
  - 11 December - Thomas Taylor Griffith, surgeon (d. 1876)
- 1796
  - 1 March - John Jones, Talysarn, preacher (d. 1857)
- 1797
  - 11 January - Connop Thirlwall, Bishop of St David's (d. 1875)
- 1798
  - 16 August - Alfred Ollivant, Bishop of Llandaff (d. 1882)
- 1799
  - 30 June - David Williams, politician (d. 1869)

== Deaths ==
- 1790
  - 20 March - Thomas Richards of Coychurch, lexicographer, 80
  - 16 October - Daniel Rowland, Methodist leader, 77
- 1791
  - 11 January - William Williams (Pantycelyn), poet and hymn-writer, 73
  - 13 February - William Parry, artist, 48
  - 19 April - Richard Price, philosopher, 68
  - 17 September - David Morris (hymn writer), 47
- 1792
  - 10 March - John Stuart, 3rd Earl of Bute, friend of Augusta, Princess of Wales and ancestor of the Marquesses of Bute, 78
  - 17 May - Sir Noah Thomas, royal physician, 72?
- 1793
  - 5 January - Elizabeth Griffith, actress and writer, 73?
- 1794
  - 22 January - John Stuart, Lord Mount Stuart, MP and heir of the Marquess of Bute, 26
  - ?August - Sackville Gwynne, landowner, 43?
  - 19 August - Sir Hugh Williams, 8th Baronet, soldier and politician, 76
  - Hon. William Paget, MP for Anglesey, 25?
- 1795
  - 25 January - Morgan Edwards, Baptist historian, 72
  - 14 October - Henry Owen, theologian, 79
- 1796
  - February - John Jones, organist, 70?
  - 8 August - Peter Williams, Methodist writer, 63
- 1797
  - 1 June - John Walters, lexicographer, 75
- 1798
  - 6 July - Joshua Evans, Quaker minister of Welsh descent, 66
  - 16 December - Thomas Pennant, naturalist and travel writer, 72
- 1799
  - May - John Evans, explorer, 29
  - 4 November - Josiah Tucker, economist, 87
