= 1770s in Wales =

- 1760s | 1780s | Other years in Wales
- Other events of the decade

This article is about the particular significance of the decade 1770–1779 to Wales and its people.

== Events ==
- 1770 in Wales
- 1771 in Wales
- 1772 in Wales
- 1773 in Wales
- 1774 in Wales
- 1775 in Wales
- 1776 in Wales
- 1777 in Wales
- 1778 in Wales
- 1779 in Wales

== Arts and literature ==
=== New books ===
- Thomas Churchyard - The Worthines of Wales, a Poem (1776)
- Evan Evans (Ieuan Fardd) - Casgliad o Bregethau (1776)
- Williams Evans - A New English-Welsh dictionary: Containing All Words Necessary for Reading an English Author (1771)
- Elizabeth Griffith - The Morality of Shakespeare's Drama Illustrated (1775)
- Evan Hughes (Hughes Fawr) - Duwdod Crist (1777)
- Jinny Jenks - Tour through Wales (1772)
- Dafydd Jones - Marwnad Enoch Ffransis (1774)
- Hugh Jones (Maesglasau)
  - Cydymaith yr Hwsmon (1774)
  - Gardd y Caniadau (1776)
- Robert Jones
  - Lleferydd yr Asyn (1770)
  - Drych i'r Anllythrennog (1778)
- Iolo Morganwg - Dagrau yr Awen (1772)
- Nicholas Owen - British Remains (1777)
- Thomas Pennant - British Zoology, vol. 4 (1777)
- David Powell (Dewi Nantbrân) - Allwydd y Nef. O gasgliad D.P. Off. (1776)
- Daniel Rowland - Pum Pregeth ac Amryw o Hymnau (1772)
- Nathaniel Williams - Dialogus (1778)
- William Williams Pantycelyn - Ductor Naptiarum: Neu Gyfarwyddwr Priodas (1777)
- Sir John Wynn - History of the Gwydir Family (posthumously published in 1770)

=== Music ===
- Dafydd Jones - Difyrrwch i'r Pererinion, vol. 3

== Births ==
- 1770
  - 15 January - Sir John Edwards, Baronet, politician (died 1850)
  - 14 April - John Evans, explorer (died 1799)
  - 30 April - David Thompson, explorer (died 1857)
- 1772
  - 10 January - William Jenkins Rees, antiquary (died 1855)
  - July - Edward Hughes (Y Dryw), bard (died 1850)
  - 25 October - Sir Watkin Williams-Wynn, 5th Baronet (died 1840)
- 1773
  - 14 November - Stapleton Cotton, 1st Viscount Combermere, military leader (died 1865)
- 1774
  - May - John Elias, preacher (died 1841)
  - 24 June - Azariah Shadrach, writer (died 1844)
- 1775
  - 25 November - Charles Kemble, actor (died 1854)
- 1776
  - April - Ann Griffiths, hymn-writer (died 1805)
  - 2 August - Thomas Assheton Smith I, industrialist and politician (died 1858)
- 1777
  - 15 June - David Daniel Davis, royal obstetrician (died 1841)
  - 29 August - John James, hymn-writer (died 1848)
  - 15 September - John Jones of Ystrad, MP (died 1842)
- 1778
  - 29 September - Benjamin Hall, industrialist and politician (died 1817)
- 1779
  - 24 August - Charles Norris, artist (died 1858)

== Deaths ==
- 1771
  - 15 May - Thomas Morgan (of Rhiwpera), politician, 43
  - date unknown
    - Lewis Hopkin, poet
    - Alban Thomas, doctor, librarian and antiquarian
    - Richard Trevor, former bishop of St David's
- 1772
  - 16 October - Richard Farrington, antiquary, 71
- 1773
  - 21 July - Howell Harris, Methodist leader, 59
- 1774
  - date unknown - Dafydd Nicolas, poet
- 1775
  - 14 August - Sir Lynch Cotton, 4th Baronet
- 1776
  - 1 November - Miles Harry, Baptist minister, 76
  - date unknown - Sir John Powell Pryce, 6th Baronet (in debtors' prison)
- 1777
  - 4 March - Edward Richard, teacher and poet, 62
  - April - John Hodges, Methodist, 77
  - 1 July - Sir John Glynne, 6th Baronet, 64
  - 30 August - Dafydd Jones, hymn-writer, 66
  - 18 December - William Lloyd, translator, 60
- 1778
  - 6 October - William Worthington, priest and author, 74
- 1779
  - 11 December - "Madam" Bridget Bevan, philanthropist, 81
