= 1800s in Wales =

- 1790s | 1810s | Other years in Wales
- Other events of the decade

This article is about the particular significance of the decade 1800–1809 to Wales and its people.

== Events ==
- 1800
- 1801
- 1802
- 1803
- 1804
- 1805
- 1806
- 1807
- 1808
- 1809

== Arts and literature ==
=== New books ===
- J. T. Barber - A Tour Throughout South Wales and Monmouthshire (1803)
- Thomas Charles - The Welsh Methodists Vindicated (1802)
- Edward Davies
  - Celtic Researches on the Origin, Traditions and Languages of the Ancient Britons (1804)
  - The Mythology and Rites of the British Druids (1809)
- Robert Davies (Bardd Nantglyn)
  - Barddoniaeth (1803)
  - Ieithiadur neu Ramadeg Cymraeg (1808)
- Thomas Edwards (Twm o'r Nant) - Bannau y Byd (1808)
- John Evans - A Tour through part of North Wales in ... 1798 and at other times (1800)
- John Jones - A Development of ... Events calculated to restore the Christian Religion to its ... Purity (1800)
- Thomas Jones - A Cardiganshire Landlord's Advice to his Tenants (1800)
- Richard Llwyd - Beaumaris Bay (1800)
- The Myvyrian Archaiology of Wales, vol. 1 (1801)
- William Ouseley - Epitome of the Ancient History of Persia (1800)
- William Owen Pughe - Geiriadur Cymraeg-Saesneg (1803)
- Abraham Rees - The New Cyclopaedia, vol. 1 (1802)
- Thomas Roberts of Llwynrhudol - Amddiffyniad i'r Methodistiaid (1806)
- Azariah Shadrach - Allwedd Myfyrdod (1801)
- Charles Symmons - Life of Milton (1806)
- Richard Warner - Second Walk Through Wales (1800)
- Henry Wigstead - Remarks on a Tour to North and South Wales: In the Year 1797 (1800)

=== Music ===
- 1802
  - Edward Jones (Bardd y Brenin) - The Musical and Poetical Relicks of the Welsh Bards, vol. 2
- 1806
  - Casgliad o Hymnau gan mwyaf heb erioed eu hargraffu o'r blaen (collection of hymns)
- 1807
  - Anthem y Saint... gan Evan Dafydd (collection of hymns)

== Sport ==
- 1802 - Royal Anglesey Yacht Club founded at Beaumaris.

== Births ==
- 1800
  - 6 March - Samuel Roberts (S.R.), Radical leader (d. 1885)
  - 20 June - Edward Douglas-Pennant, 1st Baron Penrhyn (d. 1886)
  - 1 October - Williams Evans, hymnist (d. 1880)
  - 29 November - David Griffith (Clwydfardd), poet and archdruid (d. 1894)
  - date unknown - James James (Iago Emlyn), minister and poet (d. 1879)
- 1801
  - 6 February - William Williams (Caledfryn), poet and critic (d. 1869)
  - 18 November - David Rees, minister and writer (d. 1869)
- 1802
  - August - Ebenezer Thomas, poet (d. 1863)
  - 24 August - William Rowlands (Gwilym Lleyn) (d. 1865)
  - 8 November
    - Benjamin Hall, 1st Baron Llanover (d. 1867)
    - William Rees (Gwilym Hiraethog), poet and author (d. 1883)
  - 4 December - Calvert Jones, pioneer photographer (d. 1877)
  - 12 December
    - John Ryland Harris, printer (d. 1823)
    - Isaac Williams, poet (d. 1865)
  - date unknown - Thomas Robert Jones, founder of the True Ivorites (d. 1856)
- 1803
  - 10 May - Christopher Rice Mansel Talbot, owner of Margam Castle (d. 1890)
  - 17 October - Samuel Holland, industrialist (d. 1892)
  - date unknown - Owain Meirion, balladeer (d. 1868)
- 1806
  - 1 February - Jane Williams (Ysgafell), writer (d. 1885)
  - 21 April - Sir George Cornewall Lewis, statesman (d. 1863)
- 1807
  - date unknown - Sir William Milbourne James (judge) (d. 1881)
- 1808
  - date unknown - Sir John Henry Scourfield, author (d. 1876)
- 1809
  - 18 January - John Gwyn Jeffreys, conchologist (d. 1885)
  - 17 April - Thomas Brigstocke, painter (d. 1881)
  - 24 May - William Chambers, politician (d. 1882)
  - 26 May - G. T. Clark, engineer (d. 1885)
  - 11 August - Robert Thomas (Ap Vychan), writer (d. 1880)
  - date unknown - Evan James, lyricist of the Welsh national anthem

== Deaths ==
- 1800
  - 14 March - Daines Barrington, antiquary and naturalist (b. 1727)
  - May - Evan Hughes (Hughes Fawr), clergyman and author
- 1802
  - 28 November - Robert Roberts, preacher (b. 1762)
  - 30 November - Thomas Williams of Llanidan (b. 1737)
  - 31 December - Francis Lewis, signatory of the Declaration of American Independence (b. 1713)
  - date unknown - Joseph Hoare, academic (b. 1709)
- 1804
  - 20 September - Josiah Rees, Unitarian minister (b. 1744)
  - 7 December - Morgan John Rhys, Baptist minister (b. 1760)
- 1805
  - August - Ann Griffiths, poet and hymn-writer (b. 1776)
- 1807
  - 18 July - Thomas Jones, mathematician (b. 1756)
- 1808
  - 21 January - Richard Pennant, 1st Baron Penrhyn (b. 1737)
- 1809
  - April - Charles Francis Greville, founder of Milford Haven (b. 1749)
  - 28 October - Hugh Pugh, Independent minister (b. 1779)
  - 28 November - Robert Roberts, preacher (b. 1762)
