= 1792 in Wales =

- Centuries: 16th; 17th; 18th; 19th; 20th
- Decades: 1770s; 1780s; 1790s; 1800s; 1810s
- See also: List of years in Wales; Timeline of Welsh history 1792 in Great Britain Scotland Elsewhere

This article is about the particular significance of the year 1792 to Wales and its people.

== Incumbents ==
- Lord Lieutenant of Anglesey - Henry Paget
- Lord Lieutenant of Brecknockshire and Monmouthshire – Henry Somerset, 5th Duke of Beaufort
- Lord Lieutenant of Caernarvonshire - Thomas Bulkeley, 7th Viscount Bulkeley
- Lord Lieutenant of Cardiganshire – Wilmot Vaughan, 1st Earl of Lisburne
- Lord Lieutenant of Carmarthenshire – John Vaughan
- Lord Lieutenant of Denbighshire - Richard Myddelton
- Lord Lieutenant of Flintshire - Sir Roger Mostyn, 5th Baronet
- Lord Lieutenant of Glamorgan – John Stuart, Lord Mountstuart
- Lord Lieutenant of Merionethshire - Watkin Williams
- Lord Lieutenant of Montgomeryshire – George Herbert, 2nd Earl of Powis
- Lord Lieutenant of Pembrokeshire – Richard Philipps, 1st Baron Milford
- Lord Lieutenant of Radnorshire – Thomas Harley
- Bishop of Bangor – John Warren
- Bishop of Llandaff – Richard Watson
- Bishop of St Asaph – Lewis Bagot
- Bishop of St Davids – Samuel Horsley

== Events ==
- 3 June - Monmouthshire Canal receives its Act of Parliament.
- 21 June - Iolo Morganwg holds the first Gorsedd ceremony at Primrose Hill in London.
- June - The Merthyr to Newbridge section of the Glamorganshire Canal is completed.
- Bodnant House is built.

== Arts and literature ==
=== New books ===
- David Davis (Castellhywel) - Cri Carcharor dan farn Marwolaeth
- Nicholas Owen - Carnarvonshire, a Sketch of its History, etc.
- Hester Thrale - The Three Warnings

== Births ==
- 10 February - John Jones (Ioan Tegid), writer (died 1852)
- 10 April - Charles Morgan, 1st Baron Tredegar, politician (died 1875)
- 9 June - David Arthur Saunders Davies, politician (died 1857)
- 23 July - Aneurin Owen, scholar (d. 1851)
- 27 July - Llewelyn Lloyd, naturalist (died 1876)
- 5 September - Sir David Davies, royal physician (d. 1865)
- 11 November - Mary Anne Evans (died 1872), future wife of British prime minister Benjamin Disraeli
- 20 December - David Griffiths, missionary (d. 1863)
- date unknown
  - Thomas Davies, physician (died 1839)
  - Daniel Evans, poet (Daniel Ddu o Geredigion; died 1846)
  - Sir Charles John Salusbury, 3rd Baronet (d. 1868)

== Deaths ==
- 23 February - Thomas Ellis, clergyman, about 80
- 10 March - John Stuart, 3rd Earl of Bute, friend of Augusta, Princess of Wales and ancestor of the Marquesses of Bute, 78
- 17 May - Sir Noah Thomas, royal physician, 72?
- 27 June - John Morgan (of Dderw), politician, 48
- September - John Edwards, poet (Siôn Ceiriog), 44/45
