= 1780s in Wales =

- 1770s | 1790s | Other years in Wales
- Other events of the decade

This article is about the particular significance of the decade 1780–1789 to Wales and its people.

== Events ==
- 1780
- 1781
- 1782
- 1783
- 1784
- 1785
- 1786
- 1787
- 1788
- 1789

== Arts and literature ==
=== New books ===
1780

- John Walters - Poems with Notes

1781

- Thomas Pennant - Tours in Wales, volume 2

1782

- Thomas Pennant - Journey to Snowdon, volume 1

1783

- Julia Ann Hatton - Poems on Miscellaneous Subjects

1784

- Richard Price - Importance of the American Revolution

1785

- Nathaniel Williams - Darllen Dwfr a Meddyginiaeth

1786

- David Samwell - A Narrative of the Death of Captain James Cook
- Hester Lynch Piozzi - Anecdotes of the late Samuel Johnson, Ll.D., during the last twenty years of his life

1788

- Hester Lynch Piozzi - Letters to and from the late Samuel Johnson

1789

- Richard Price - Love for our Country

=== Music ===
1781

- John Parry (harpist) - British Harmony, being a Collection of Antient Welsh Airs

1783

- Evan Hughes (Hughes Fawr) - Rhai Hymnau Newyddion o Fawl i'r Oen

1784

- Edward Jones (Bardd y Brenin) - The Musical and Poetical Relicks of the Welsh Bards

1787

- Nathaniel Williams - Ychydig o Hymnau Newyddion

== Births ==
- 1780
  - 10 February - James Henry Cotton, Dean of Bangor (died 1862)
  - 14 May - Sir Thomas Frankland Lewis, politician (died 1855)
  - 7 October - Wyndham Lewis, MP (died 1838)
- 1781
- 1782
  - 20 January - Sir William Nott, military leader (died 1845)
  - 29 December - Sir William Lloyd, soldier and mountaineer (died 1857)
- 1783
  - May - Cadwaladr Jones, minister and literary editor (died 1867)
- 1784
  - 17 January - Joseph Tregelles Price, ironmaster (died 1854)
  - date unknown - Walter Coffin, coal-owner (died 1867)
- 1785
  - December - Richard Jones (Gwyndaf Eryri), poet (died 1848)
  - 24 December - William Bruce Knight, clergyman and scholar (died 1845)
  - date unknown - William Owen, historian (died 1864)
- 1786
- 1787
  - 2 October - Thomas Price (Carnhuanawc), historian (died 1848)
- 1788
  - 12 February - William Williams, MP (died 1865)
  - 3 October - John Montgomery Traherne, antiquary (died 1860)
- 1789
  - 22 April - Richard Roberts, engineer (died 1864)
  - 24 May - Beti Cadwaladr, Crimea nurse (died 1860)

== Deaths ==
- 1780
  - 6 March - Sir John Meredith, lawyer, 65
  - 1 April - Sir Stephen Glynne, 7th Baronet, 35
  - date unknown - Richard Thomas, priest and antiquarian, 46
- 1781
  - 4 April - Henry Thrale, brewer
  - 12 October - David Powell (Dewi Nantbrân), Franciscan friar and author
- 1782
  - 15 May - Richard Wilson, landscape painter, 54
  - November - John Parry, harpist
- 1783
  - 7 August - Thomas Llewellyn, Baptist minister and writer, 63?
  - 6 September - Anna Williams, friend of Dr Johnson, 77?
- 1784
  - 5 April - David Williams, minister and schoolmaster, 74?
- 1785
  - 2 February - John Guest, industrialist, 63
  - 20 October - David Jones of Trefriw, poet, 77?
- 1789
  - 24 July - Sir Watkin Williams-Wynn, 4th Baronet, politician, 39
  - 7 August - William Edwards, minister and bridge-builder, 70
  - 26 November - Elizabeth Baker, diarist, 70?
