= 1710s in Wales =

- 1700s | 1720s | Other years in Wales
- Other events of the decade

This article is about the particular significance of the decade 1710–1719 to Wales and its people.

== Events ==
1710

- John Wynne obtains permission from the bishop's court to change the name of Trelawnyd to "Newmarket".
- A committee of the House of Commons declares Sir Humphrey Mackworth guilty of "many notorious and scandalous frauds".

1711

- Thomas Durston begins printing Welsh language books at Shrewsbury.
- The Baptist Church in the Great Valley (Pennsylvania) is founded by Welsh immigrants.

1712

- Jonathan Edwards dies, leaving his library to Jesus College, Oxford.

1713

- Sir Humphrey Mackworth forms the Company of Mineral Manufacturers.
- Edmund Meyrick dies, leaving a large bequest to Jesus College for scholarships for students from North Wales.

1714

- May 8 - Bishop Adam Ottley complains that Griffith Jones (Llanddowror) has been "going about preaching on week days in Churches, Churchyards, and sometimes on the mountains, to hundreds of auditors".
- September 27 - Prince George, son of King George I, is invested as Prince of Wales. His wife, Caroline, becomes Princess of Wales, the first to receive the title at the same time as her husband and the first Princess of Wales for over two hundred years.

1715

1716

- Griffith Jones becomes rector of Llanddowror.

1717

- Japanning of tinplate begins at Pontypool.
- First copper smelting works in the Lower Swansea valley opened by John Lane at Llangyfelach, Landore.

1718

- July 11 - Howell Davis, mate of the Cadogan, is captured by Edward England and decides to become a pirate captain himself.

1719

- The wrought-iron gates at Chirk Castle and St Giles' Church, Wrexham, are completed by the Davies Brothers of Bersham.
- The first permanent legal printing press in Wales is established at Adpar by Isaac Carter of Carmarthenshire. It is believed that its first two publications are Cân o Senn i’w hen Feistr Tobacco by Alban Thomas and Cân ar Fesur Triban ynghylch Cydwybod a’i Chynheddfau.

== Arts and literature ==
=== New books ===
1711

- Jonathan Edwards - A Vindication of the Doctrine of Original Sin from the exceptions of Dr. Daniel Whitby

1714

- John Morgan of Matchin - Myfyrdodau bucheddol ar y pedwar peth diweddaf
- Christmas Samuel - Gemau Doethineb

1718

- Thomas Taylor - The Principality of Wales exactly described... (London), the first atlas of Wales

1719

- Christmas Samuel - Catecism o'r Scrythur

== Births ==
1710

- May 16 - William Talbot, 1st Earl Talbot, politician (d. 1782)

1711

- approximate date - Daniel Rowland, Methodist leader (d. 1790)

1713

- March 21 - Francis Lewis, merchant, signatory of the United States Declaration of Independence (d. 1803)
- December - Josiah Tucker, economist (d. 1799)
- date unknown - Sir John Glynne, 6th Baronet (d. 1777)

1714

- March - Edward Richard, schoolmaster and poet (d. 1777)
- August 1 - Richard Wilson, painter (d. 1782)

1716

- date unknown - Henry Owen, theologian (d. 1795)

1717

- November 13 - Prince George William, first child born to the new Prince and Princess of Wales since they took their titles (d. 1718)

1719

- February - William Edwards, clergyman and bridge engineer (d. 1789)
- November 30 - Princess Augusta of Saxe-Gotha, future Princess of Wales (d. 1772)

== Deaths ==
1712

- November 20 - Humphrey Humphreys, bishop, 63
- July 20 - Jonathan Edwards, theologian and academic, 83

1713

- January 12 - John Vaughan, 3rd Earl of Carbery, 73
- April 24 - Edmund Meyrick, priest and educational benefactor, 77

1714

- June 22 - Matthew Henry, Presbyterian minister, 51

1715

- January 16 - Robert Nelson, philanthropist and non-juror, 58
- June 29 - Richard Lucas, clergyman and author, 66?

1716

- January 26 - Daniel Williams, theologian, 72?

1717

- May 20 - John Trevor, politician, 80?
- August 30 - William Lloyd, former Bishop of St Asaph, 90

1718

- February 17 - Prince George William of Wales, three months old
- May 1 - Robert Daniell, coloniser of The Carolinas, 71 or 72
- December 26 - Mary Steele, wife of Sir Richard Steele, 40

1719

- June 19 - Captain Howell Davis, pirate, ca 29
- date unknown - Sir John Wynn, 5th Baronet
