= 1750s in Wales =

- 1740s | 1760s | Other years in Wales
- Other events of the decade

This article is about the particular significance of the decade 1750–1759 to Wales and its people.

== Events ==
1750 in Wales
1751 in Wales
1752 in Wales
1753 in Wales
1754 in Wales
1755 in Wales
1756 in Wales
1757 in Wales
1758 in Wales
1759 in Wales

== Arts and literature ==
=== New books ===
1750

- Griffith Hughes - Natural History of Barbados
- Daniel Rowland - Ymddiddan rhwng Methodist Uniawngred ac un Cyfeiliornus

1752

- Theophilus Evans - A History of Modern Enthusiasm

1757

- John Dyer - The Fleece
- Elizabeth Griffith - A Series of Genuine Letters between Henry and Frances
- Joseph Harris - An Essay Upon Money and Coins
- Joshua Thomas - Tystiolaeth y Credadyn

=== Music ===
1751

- William Williams (Pantycelyn) - Hosanna i Fab Dafydd, part 1

1754

- William Williams (Pantycelyn) - Hosanna i Fab Dafydd, part 2

1755

- Morgan Rhys - Golwg o Ben Nebo, ar Wlad yr Addewid (hymns)

1756

- Elis Roberts - "Argulus"

1757

- Elis Roberts - "Jeils"

1759

- William Williams (Pantycelyn) - Rhai Hymnau a Chaniadau Duwiol

== Births ==
1750

- June - William Morgan, actuary (d. 1833)

1751

- 22 January - David Richards (Dafydd Ionawr), poet (d. 1827)
- 15 October - David Samwell, naval surgeon and companion of Captain Cook (d. 1798)

1752

- 2 January - Nicholas Owen, priest and antiquary (d. 1811)
- 18 January - Josiah Boydell, painter (d. 1817)
- March - Edward Jones (Bardd y Brenin), harpist (d. 1824)
- date unknown
  - Richard Llwyd, poet and writer (d. 1835)
  - Thomas Assheton Smith I, industrialist (d. 1828)

1754

- date unknown - Charles Hassall, surveyor (d. 1814)

1755

- 22 February - Henry Nevill, 2nd Earl of Abergavenny (d. 1843)
- 5 July - Sarah Siddons, actress (d. 1831)
- 14 October - Thomas Charles of Bala, priest (d. 1814)

1756

- 7 June - Edward Davies ("Celtic" Davies), writer (d. 1831)
- 23 June - Thomas Jones, mathematician (d. 1807)
- date unknown - Thomas Jones of Denbigh, minister and author (d. 1820)

1757

- date unknown - Sir Thomas Foley, admiral (d. 1833)

1758

- August - Sir Thomas Picton, soldier (d. 1815)

1759

- 16 March - Sir John Nicholl, politician and judge (d. 1838)
- 7 August - William Owen Pughe, lexicographer (d. 1835)
- 18 October - Theophilus Jones, historian (d. 1812)

== Deaths ==
1750

- 9 January - Henry Herbert, 9th Earl of Pembroke, 56
- 29 November - Bussy Mansel, 4th Baron Mansel
- date unknown - Sir Samuel Pennant, Lord Mayor of London

1751

- 31 March - Frederick, Prince of Wales, 44
- date unknown - Thomas Mathews, admiral, 75

1752

- 31 May - "Madam" Sidney Griffith, Methodist supporter

1754

- 10 January - Erasmus Lewis, writer and civil servant, 83
- March - Henry Vaughan, Radnorshire landowner, 33 (murdered)
- 12 July - Zachariah Williams, inventor, 81

1755

- 30 June - Edward Wynne, lawyer and landowner

1756

- date unknown - Lewis Evans, surveyor, 56?

1757

- December - John Dyer, poet, 56

1758

- 24 January - William Wogan, religious writer, 79
- 18 March - Matthew Hutton, Archbishop of Canterbury and former Bishop of Bangor, 65
- 24 March - Sir Thomas Mostyn, 4th Baronet, 53

1759

- 11 August - John Heylyn, Welsh-descended priest, 74
- 2 November - Charles Hanbury Williams, diplomat and satirist, 50
- date unknown - Isaac Maddox, Bishop of St Asaph, 62
