= 1760s in Wales =

- 1750s | 1770s | Other years in Wales
- Other events of the decade

This article is about the particular significance of the decade 1760–1769 to Wales and its people.

== Events ==
- 1760 in Wales
- 1761 in Wales
- 1762 in Wales
- 1763 in Wales
- 1764 in Wales
- 1765 in Wales
- 1766 in Wales
- 1767 in Wales
- 1768 in Wales
- 1769 in Wales

== Arts and literature ==
=== New books ===
- 1762
  - Thomas Edwards (Twm o'r Nant) - Tri Chydymaith Dyn
  - Oliver Goldsmith - The Life of Richard Nash
- 1763
  - Goronwy Owen et al. - Diddanwch Teuluaidd
- 1764
  - Evan Evans (Ieuan Fardd) - Some Specimens of the Poetry of the Antient Welsh Bards
- 1766
  - David Jones of Trefriw (ed.) - Cydymaith Diddan
  - John Roberts (Siôn Robert Lewis) - Drych y Cristion
  - Anna Williams - Miscellanies in Prose and Verse
- 1767
  - Evan Thomas (Ieuan Fardd Ddu) - Traethawd ar Fywyd Ffydd
- 1768
  - Thomas Edwards (Twm o'r Nant) - Y Farddoneg Fabilonaidd

== Births ==
- 1760
  - 6 July - Thomas Phillips, surgeon and educational benefactor (d. 1851)
  - 8 December - Morgan John Rhys, minister and author (d. 1804)
- 1761
  - 15 July - Walter Davies (Gwallter Mechain), writer (d. 1849)
  - 11 October - David Charles, hymn-writer (d. 1834)
- 1762
  - 12 August - George, Prince of Wales, later King George IV (d. 1830)
- 1763
  - August - Peter Bailey Williams, clergyman and author (d. 1836)
- 1764
  - 29 April - Julia Ann Hatton, novelist (d. 1838)
  - 20 June - Thomas Evans (Tomos Glyn Cothi), first Unitarian minister in Wales (d. 1833)
  - date unknown - Robert Waithman, lord mayor of London (d. 1833)
- 1766
  - March William Turner, industrialist (d. 1853)
  - 6 December - Robert Williams (Robert ap Gwilym Ddu), poet (d. 1850)
  - 25 December - Christmas Evans, preacher (d. 1838)
- 1768
  - August - Sydenham Teak Edwards, botanical artist (d. 1819)
  - 17 September - Edward Lloyd, 1st Baron Mostyn (d. 1854)
  - 24 September - Sharon Turner, historian (d. 1847)

== Deaths ==
- 1760
  - April - David Lewis, poet
  - 25 October - King George II of Great Britain, former Prince of Wales, 76
- 1761
  - 8 April - Griffith Jones Llanddowror, pioneer in education, 77
- 1762
  - 3 February - Beau Nash, leader of fashion, 87
- 1763
  - 25 November - Richard Morris, father of the noted Morris brothers ("Morrisiaid Môn"), 89
- 1764
  - 18 June - Christmas Samuel, minister and writer, 90
  - 22 June - Sir John Philipps, 6th Baronet, 63
  - 26 September - Joseph Harris, Assay-master of the Royal Mint, 60
- 1765
  - 10 April - Edward Heylyn, porcelain manufacturer, 70?
  - 11 April - Lewis Morris, hydrographer and writer, eldest of the Morris brothers of Anglesey, 64
- 1767
  - 11 September - Theophilus Evans, clergyman and historian, 74
  - 17 September - Prince Edward, Duke of York and Albany, second son of Frederick, Prince of Wales, 28
- 1768
  - 26 March - Humphrey Owen, academic, 65
- 1769
  - July - Goronwy Owen, poet, 46
