= 1700s in Wales =

- 17th century | 1710s | Other years in Wales
- Other events of the decade

This article is about the particular significance of the decade 1700–1709 to Wales and its people.

== Events ==
1700

- Quaker emigrant Rowland Ellis is elected to represent Philadelphia in the provincial assembly.

1701

- November - Humphrey Humphreys becomes Bishop of Hereford, and is replaced as Bishop of Bangor by John Evans.
- Humphrey Mackworth becomes MP for Cardiganshire.
- Edward Jones, Bishop of St Asaph, is temporarily removed from his position after being found guilty of simony and maladministration.

1702

- 23rd Regiment of Foot granted the title The Welsh Regiment of Fusiliers.

1703

- Thomas Griffiths and a small group of followers settle at Welsh Tract, Delaware, where they found the Welsh Tract Baptist church.
- Sir Roger Mostyn, 3rd Baronet, marries Lady Essex Finch.

1704

- Jane Kemeys marries Sir John Tynte, 2nd Baronet, resulting in an alliance between two important families and the beginning of the Kemeys-Tynte dynasty.
- July - Richard Vaughan of Corsygedol becomes Constable of Harlech Castle.

1705

- George Bull becomes Bishop of St David's.

1706

- Crickhowell Bridge rebuilt in stone.
- Humphrey Mackworth's company grants £20 a year towards a charity school at Esgair Hir mine in Cardiganshire, £30 a year towards a minister there, and £20 a year towards a charity school at Neath.

1707

1708

- Edmund Meyrick sets up a school at Carmarthen.
- Charles Talbot, 1st Baron Talbot of Hensol, marries Cecil Mathew of Castell y Mynach in Pentyrch.

1709

== New books ==
1702

- David Maurice - Cynffwrdd i'r gwan Gristion, neu'r gorsen ysig (translation from work of Theophilus Dorrington)

1703

- Ellis Wynne - Gweledigaetheu y Bardd Cwsc

1704

- Robert Nelson - A Companion for the Festivals and Fasts of the Church of England

1705

- Myles Davies - The Recantation of Mr. Pollett, a Roman priest
- Letters of Orinda to Poliarchus (the letters of Katherine Philips (posthumously published)

1706

- William Jones - Synopsis Palmariorum Matheseos

1707

- Edward Lhuyd - Archaeologia Britannica, vol. 1: Glossography

== Births ==
1700

- 8 March – William Morgan the elder, of Tredegar, politician (d. 1731)
- date unknown - Guto Nyth Brân, legendary athlete (d. 1737)
- probable – Lewis Evans, surveyor (d. 1756)

1701

- date unknown - Richard Trevor, bishop (d. 1771)

1702

- 20 May - Thomas Morgan, judge (d. 1769)
- date unknown - Humphrey Owen, academic (d. 1768)

1703

- 2 February - Richard Morris, one of the celebrated Morris brothers of Anglesey (d. 1779)
- probable - Henry Arthur Herbert, 4th Earl of Powis (d. 1772)

1704

- May - Ann Maddocks, the "maid of Cefn Ydfa" (d. 1727)

1705

- 6 May - William Morris, botanist, one of the Morris brothers of Anglesey (d. 1763)

1707

- 1 February - Frederick, Prince of Wales (d. 1751)

1708

- 8 December - Charles Hanbury Williams, diplomat and satirist (d. 1759)
- date unknown - John Pettingall, antiquary (d. 1781)

1709

- date unknown
  - Joseph Hoare, academic (d. 1802)
  - David Williams, schoolmaster (d. 1784)

== Deaths ==
1700

- 27 June - Hugh Owen, Independent minister, 60?
- 11 July - William Williams, Speaker of the House of Commons, 66
- September – Sir John Aubrey, 2nd Baronet, politician
- 8 December - Edward Harley, politician, 76
- 16 December - Thomas Morgan (of Dderw), politician, 36 (smallpox)

1701

- date unknown - Sir John Hanmer, 3rd Baronet (in a duel)

1702

- January - James Annesley, 3rd Earl of Anglesey, 31
- 25 March - Lewis Wogan, High Sheriff of Pembrokeshire, age unknown

1703

- 10 May - Edward Jones, Bishop of St Asaph, 62

1704

- May - William Wynne, historian

1705

- date unknown - Lionel Wafer, explorer, 65

1707

- date unknown - Edward Ravenscroft, dramatist

1708

- 1 December - William Wogan, politician

1709

- 30 June - Edward Lhuyd, naturalist, 49

1717

- 20 May - John Trevor lawyer and politician, expelled Speaker of the House of Commons, c.80

1720

- 7 March - John Morgan (of Rhiwpera), politician, 49
- 22 August - Sir Thomas Powell, 1st Baronet, politician, about 55
- 29 August - Charles Williams, merchant, 87

1725

- 18 January - Hugh Cholmondeley, 1st Earl of Cholmondeley, Lord Lieutenant of North Wales, 62
- 25 July - Rev Thomas Griffith, 80, first pastor of Welsh Tract Baptist Church, Delaware, USA.
- 29 November - William Jones, 49, Principal of Jesus College, Oxford.
- 15 December - Francis Edwardes, politician

1790

- 4 March - Samuel Hallifax, Bishop of St Asaph, 57
- 20 March - Thomas Richards of Coychurch, cleric and lexicographer, 80
- 24 August - John Worgan, organist and composer, 66
- 16 October - Daniel Rowland, Methodist leader, c.79
- 5 November - Michael Lort, clergyman, academic and antiquary, 65
