= Edward Jones (Methodist preacher) =

Welsh Calvinistic Methodist lay preacher

Edward Jones (c. 1741 – after 1806), nicknamed "Ginshop" Jones, was a Welsh Calvinistic Methodist "exhorter" and lay preacher in London, who ended his life in disgrace.

Jones is believed to have been born in about 1741 in Llansannan, Denbighshire. As a young man, he served as a trooper in the Life Guards. At about this time, he was converted to Methodism by George Whitefield, and became an "exhorter" at Whitefield's Moorfields Tabernacle, London, and a lay preacher. After leaving the army, he earned his living as a publican and spirit-merchant, resulting in his later nickname of "Ginshop".

In 1774 he began to hold Welsh-language services in Cock Lane, Smithfield; and in 1785 he established, and became pastor of, a Welsh Calvinistic Methodist chapel in Wilderness Row (now Clerkenwell Road), Clerkenwell. However, he managed to alienate a number of members of his congregation, particularly when he expelled two granddaughters of the prominent Welsh Calvinistic Methodist leader Daniel Rowland for marrying "outside the Connexion".

Not long afterwards, Jones's wife died; and in 1799 he became engaged to Gwen Prydderch, a young woman of 28 (30 years his junior). However, on a return visit to Wales in 1800 he married instead a wealthy widow of 63. The younger woman was persuaded by Jones's enemies to sue him for breach of promise, and in January 1801 he was fined £50. John Jones (Jac Glan-y-gors) revelled in his disgrace by composing a ribald ballad about his misfortunes; and the anti-Methodist Gwyneddigion and Cymreigyddion Societies added to his embarrassment by publishing a pamphlet of the love-letters which had been read out in court. Many of his congregation abandoned him, and the Calvinistic Methodist Association suspended him, and effectively expelled him from the connexion. He still held the trust-deeds of the chapel, and attempted to turn his congregation out of it, but was eventually persuaded to hand them over in 1806. He was forced to "retire, snarling", and is supposed to have spent the rest of his life in Wales.

== Bibliography ==
- Edwards, Huw (2017). "On the trail of 'Ginshop Jones': Welsh nonconformists in eighteenth-century London". Welsh History Review. 28 (3): 470–486.
- Jenkins, R. T.; Ramage, Helen M. (1951). A History of the Honourable Society of Cymmrodorion and of the Gwyneddigion and Cymreigyddion Societies (1751–1951). Y Cymmrodor. Vol. 50. London: Honourable Society of Cymmrodorion. pp. 123–125.
- Jenkins, R. T. (1959). "Jones, Edward (1741?–after 1806)". Dictionary of Welsh Biography. National Library of Wales.
- Jones, Emrys, ed. (2001). The Welsh in London, 1500–2000. Cardiff: University of Wales Press. pp. 82, 95. ISBN 0708317103.
