= Daniel Evans (Welsh poet) =

British poet (1792–1846)

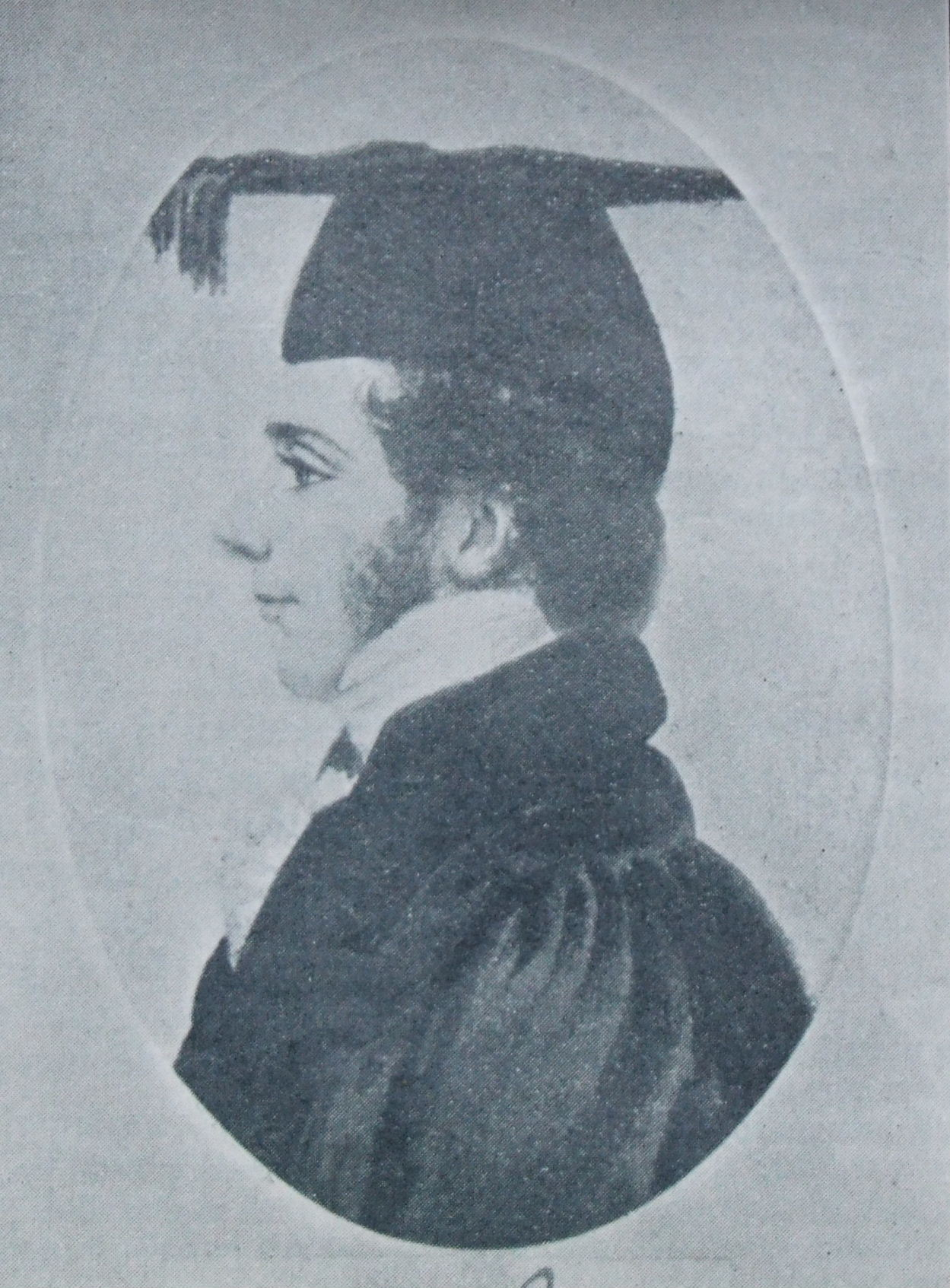
Daniel Evans (Daniel Ddu o Geredigion)

Daniel Evans (1792 – 28 March 1846), better known by his pseudonym, Daniel Ddu o Geredigion, was a Welsh language poet.

== Life ==
Evans was born at Maesymynach, a farm in the parish of Llanfihangel Ystrad, Cardiganshire. He was the second of three sons born to a farmer, David Evans. Daniel Evans attended the grammar school in Lampeter, where he was taught by Eliezer Williams, before attending Jesus College, Oxford. He matriculated in 1810, and obtained degrees of B.A. (1814), M.A. (1817) and B.D. (1824). In 1817, he was elected by the college to a fellowship, which he held until his death in 1846, but he resided mainly in Wales.

Although Evans was ordained, he came to public attention as a poet rather than as a priest. He served briefly as chaplain of the Royal Military Asylum in Northampton, but resigned due to ill-health and returned home to his parents in Wales. He had no clerical appointments thereafter. In 1819, he was involved with the Dyfed Cambrian Society's attempt to revive the eisteddfod, and was also elected as poet to the London-based Gwyneddigion Society. Four years later, in 1823, he won two major poetry prizes at the Carmarthen Eisteddfod, one for Awdl ar Sefydliad Coleg Dewi Sant and the other for Awdl ar Fuddugoliaethau diweddar y Groegiaid ar y Tyrciaid. He had a particular skill for love and nature poetry. His collected works were published in 1830 under the title Gwinllan y bardd, with an expanded second edition in 1872 drawing on unpublished sources; a third edition was published in 1906. He wrote in classical forms as well as in modern style. Whilst Evans did write a few poems in English, these are regarded as of lesser merit than his Welsh poems. Though highly regarded in the nineteenth century, his reputation has fallen in later times.

Evans, who suffered from depression, committed suicide in Maesnewydd, Llanwnnen, Cardiganshire on 28 March 1846, and was buried on 1 April 1846 at Pencarreg, Carmarthenshire.

== Works ==
Evans's writings included:

- Awdlau: gan … Daniel Evans, bardd i Anrhydeddus Gym-deithas y Gwyneddigion, Llundain (1810)
- Gwlad fy Ngenedigaeth and Attebiad 'Ioan Tegid' (1819?) (a poem trying to persuade Ioan Tegid to remain in Wales rather than travel to the East Indies)
- Awdl Marwnad Eliezer Williams (1820)
- Englynion er cofiant Ifor Hael, Arglwydd Maesaleg (1822)
- Golwg ar Gyflwr yr Iddewon, Cerdd (1826)
- Ar ddylanwadau yr Yspryd Glan: ymadrodd ar y pwnc … wedi ei gyfieithu a'i dalfyrru gan … Daniel Evans (1826)
- Palesteina: neu, Hanes yr Iddewon a Gwlad Canaan (1841)
- Galar-Cerdd ar farwolaeth William Bruce Knight, Deon Llandaf (1845)
- Cerdd Arwraidd ar y Gauaf won Evans a silver medal and prize, presented by Thomas Beynon, a fellow poet, who was president of the Carmarthen Society of Cymreigyddion.
