= 1720s in Wales =

- 1710s | 1730s | Other years in Wales
- Other events of the decade

This article is about the particular significance of the decade 1720–1729 to Wales and its people.

== Events ==
1720

- Charles Hanbury Williams succeeds to the estate of his godfather, and takes the surname Williams.

1721

- December 30 - Bridget Vaughan marries Arthur Bevan, a barrister.

1722

1723

1724

- A charity school is built at Caerleon-on-Usk as the result of a bequest from Charles Williams.

1725

- 4 May - Ann Thomas (the "Maid of Cefn Ydfa") marries Anthony Maddocks.
- Silvanus Bevan is elected a Fellow of the Royal Society on the recommendation of Sir Isaac Newton.

1726

- 26 July - Prince Frederick, son of the Prince of Wales, is created Baron Snowdon by his grandfather, King George I of Great Britain.

1727

- The Piercefield estate is sold for £3,366, 5.6d to Thomas Rous of Wotton-under-Edge.

1728

1729

- 8 January - Prince Frederick, son of King George II, is created Prince of Wales, nearly two years after his father's accession.
- 1 March - A St. David's Society is established by Welsh immigrants in Philadelphia.
- 19 October - John Harris becomes Bishop of Llandaff.
- Zachariah Williams is admitted as a poor brother pensioner of the Charterhouse in London.

== Arts and literature ==
=== New books ===
1721

- Ellis Pugh - Annerch ir Cymru (first Welsh book published in America)

1723

- Henry Rowlands - Mona Antiqua Restaurata
- Christmas Samuel - Llun Agrippa

1724

- Owen Wynne - The Life of Sir Leoline Jenkins

1725

- Dafydd Lewys - Golwg ar y Byd

1729

- Christmas Samuel - Golwg ar y Testament Newydd

== Births ==
1720

- July 22 - Sir Herbert Lloyd, 1st Baronet, politician (d. 1769)

1722

- May 9 - Morgan Edwards, Baptist historian (d. 1795)

1723

- February 23 - Richard Price, philosopher (d. 1791)
- March 5 - Princess Mary of Wales, daughter of the Prince and Princess of Wales (d. 1772)

1724

- April - Joshua Eddowes, printer and bookseller (d. 1811)
- December 4 - Princess Louise of Wales, daughter of the Prince and Princess of Wales (d. 1751)

1725

- May - Llewellin Penrose, painter
- September 7 - Francis Homfray, industrialist (d. 1798)

1726

- June 14 - Thomas Pennant, traveller and writer (d. 1798)
- William Jones, poet, antiquary and radical (d. 1795)

== Deaths ==
1720

- March 7 - John Morgan (of Rhiwpera), politician, 49
- April/May - Robert Wynne, clergyman and poet
- August 29 - Charles Williams, merchant, 87
- December 31 - John Wynne, industrialist

1721

- July 8 - Elihu Yale, benefactor of Yale University, 72
- date unknown - Sir William Glynne, 2nd Baronet

1722

- February 10 - Bartholomew Roberts, pirate ("Black Bart"), 39 (in battle)
- November 16 - John Vaughan, reformer, 59

1723

- December 28 - Sir Charles Lloyd, 1st Baronet, of Milfield, politician, 61

1724

- March 22 - John Evans, Bishop of Bangor and Meath, 73?
- June 1 - Erasmus Saunders, clergyman, 54?
- date unknown - Richard Bulkeley, 4th Viscount Bulkeley

1725

- December 15 - Francis Edwardes, politician

1729

- April 29 - Sir Stephen Glynne, 3rd Baronet, 64
- September - Sir Stephen Glynne, 4th Baronet, 35?
- September 1 - Sir Richard Steele, satirist, 57
