= Borough Welsh Congregational Chapel =

Welsh church in Southwark, London

Coordinates: 51.5029°N 0.0968°W

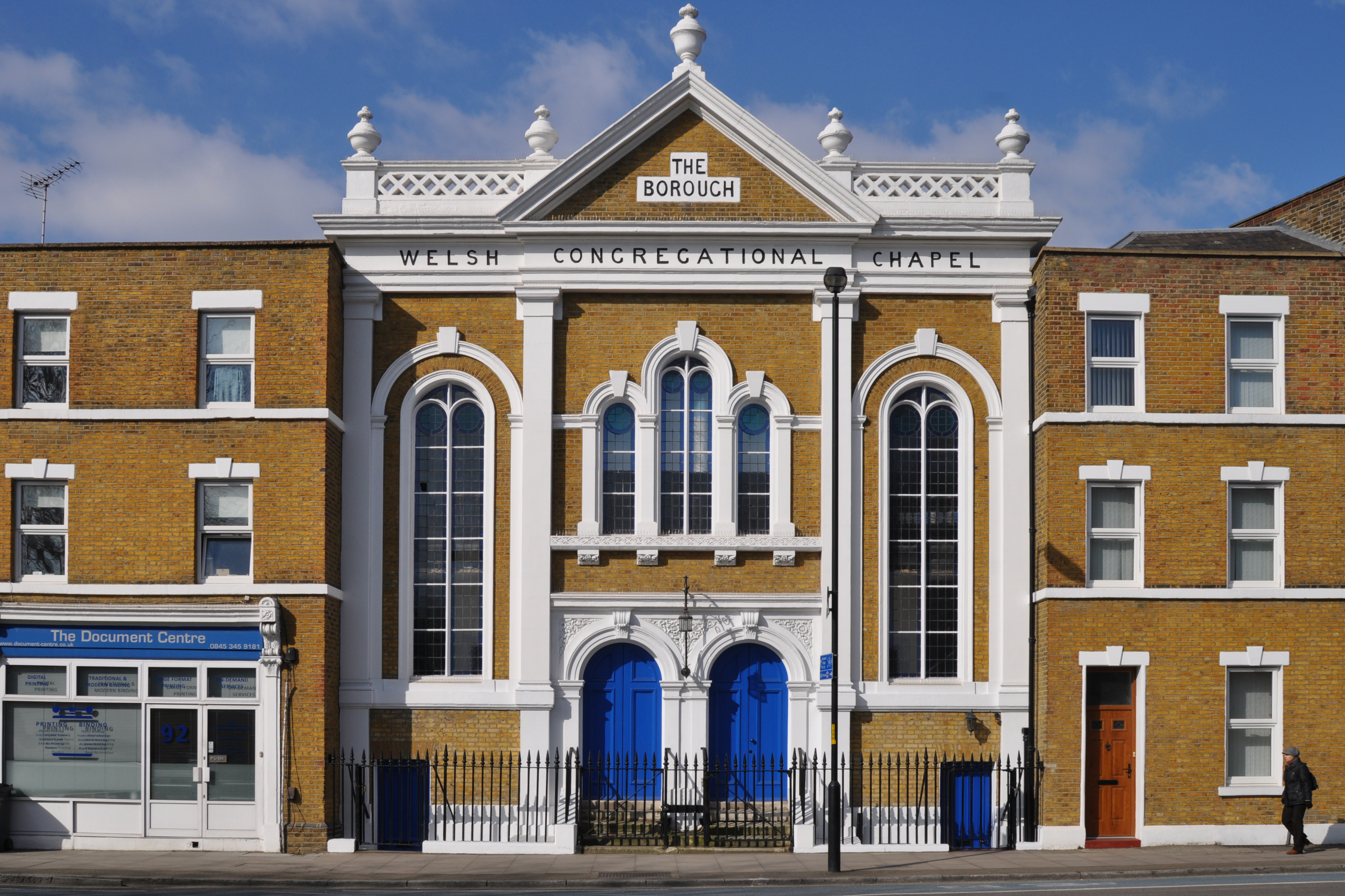
- Borough Welsh Congregational Chapel
- Location: 90 Southwark Bridge Road London SE1 0EX
- Country: England

Architecture
- Years built: 1870

The Borough Welsh Congregational Chapel (Welsh: Capel-y-Boro) is the mother chapel of the Welsh Congregational church in London, England. It is located at 90 Southwark Bridge Road in Southwark, a district also known as "The Borough".

The roots of the congregation date back to 1774. There has been a Welsh chapel on the current site since 1806, although the present building dates from 1870.

== History ==
The history of the congregation goes back to 1774 when Edward Jones, an "exhorter" at Whitefield's Tabernacle, Moorfields, and a lay preacher, began to hold Welsh-language services in Cock Lane, Smithfield. (His trade was that of publican and spirit-merchant, resulting in his later nickname of "Ginshop Jones".) The services continued at Cock Lane until 1785 when Jones established a Welsh Calvinistic Methodist Chapel in Wilderness Row, Clerkenwell (now Clerkenwell Road).

Shortly afterwards a Welsh service commenced in Gravel Lane, Southwark, as a branch of the Wilderness Row congregation. A split came between the two congregations when Gravel Lane became completely Congregational and Wilderness Row completely Methodist. It appears that this was the beginning of the Welsh Chapel.

In 1806 a chapel was built in Little Guildford Street, Southwark. The chapel held about 500 people and cost £1200 to build leasehold.

== Current building ==
About 1870 the freehold for the ground on which the chapel stood was purchased and a new chapel was built on the site. The foundation stone was laid on 31 July 1872 by Samuel Morley (MP) a famous Congregationalist, who donated £500 to the new chapel which was opened on Sunday, 23 February 1872. The Chapel today stands in the same place as the old chapel but instead of the entrance facing Little Guildford Street, it now faces Southwark Bridge Road. On 8 August 1881, David Simon Davies from Carmarthen College was ordained as the first Minister.

In the Burns' Day storm on 25 January 1990, part of the roof and two chimneys fell into the Chapel causing a great deal of damage. It took six months to rebuild the gallery, and during this time services were held in the vestry. The Chapel was re-opened on 22 November 1990.

== Activities ==
The Chapel holds a bi-lingual service from 11am most 2nd, 3rd and 4th Sundays of the month. Services are often followed by lunch. Members have a strong commitment to the local and global community, and regularly raise money for a wide range of different charities.
