= Robin Stevens =

Robin Stevens may refer to:

- Robin Stevens (author) (born 1988), American-born English author of children's fiction
- Robin Stevens (composer) (1958-2026), British composer and cellist
- Robin Stevens (puppeteer) (born 1960), English puppeteer, actor, director and writer
- Robin Stevens (rugby union) (born 1996), South African rugby union player
