= Thomas Roberts (radical writer) =

Welsh radical writer (b. 1765/6, d. 1841)

Thomas Roberts (1765/66–1841) was a Welsh radical writer.

== Personal life ==
Roberts was a son to William and Jane Roberts of Llwyn'rhudol. He was baptized at Llwyn'rhudol Uchaf in the parish of Aber-erch near Pwllheli, Caernarvonshire. He moved from Wales to London before he reached the age of 14, and was probably apprenticed to a goldsmith.

In 1791, Roberts married Mary, the daughter of a prosperous Warwickshire Quaker family. Their first child, Hannah, was born in October the same year. They had five daughters and a son and lived near the city of London at Aldgate, Clerkenwell. Mary died in March 1829 and was buried on 5 April in Bunhill Fields.

Roberts became a London goldsmith through Mary's family. In 1802, Roberts practiced at the firm of Weatherby and Roberts, goldsmiths and then worked at the firm of Thomas and R. J. Roberts in 1805. Thomas Roberts was an active member of Gwyneddigion, a society of Welsh patriots founded in London in 1770 as a Welsh-language debating society that discussed the controversial issues of radical London politics at a time of insecurity and censorship.

== Career ==
The society's purpose was the proclamation of Freedom within Society. In 1798, Roberts published the book Cwyn yn erbyn Gorthrymder (A Complaint Against Oppression). The radical pamphlet became a Welsh Enlightenment with the purpose of developing the Welsh language for learning and furthering sentiments of cultural distinctiveness to support Welsh Nationalism in the 19th century. The pamphlets used English to brand expressions and people as hostile to Wales and the Welsh language. In 1827, Roberts published an English and Welsh Vocabulary and a pocket book of Welsh phrases with their English equivalents. To ensure that Wales benefited from many of the works previously available in English, Roberts published a Welsh version of Benjamin Franklin's Poor Richard's Almanack in 1839. He then published Welsh versions of English devotional materials. Known for his critical knowledge of his native tongue, Roberts managed the publication of the Welsh edition of the Book of Common Prayer, while correcting some of the inaccuracies of earlier editions.

Roberts joined in challenging the clerical privilege enjoyed by the Established church and wrote against the civic inequalities experienced by the dissenters of Methodism in 18th-19th century Wales. Thomas picked up on the 'Apostles of Liberty' Richard Price and Joseph Priestley's demands for liberty of conscience as well as Thomas Paine's condemnation of 'priestcraft' as a pillar of corruption. His writings attacked tithing and the establishment of churches by a state. Roberts' pamphlets were satirized by Methodist Poet Evan Pritchard, who stated that Roberts had sent him a book from London that contained a complaint against the Methodist Bishops. Although Pritchard stated that he did not have much to say against Roberts, he suggested that he disliked Roberts' accusations. Although Roberts was not a supporter of the Methodists, he spoke in their defense. His pseudonymous writing as Arvonius spoke against the libelous anti-Methodism of a fellow London-Welshman, Anglican Edward Charles. His defence was inspired by a Quaker dislike of the established church and a radical distaste for ‘old corruption’.

== Later life ==
Roberts lost much of his wealth towards the end of his life. He lived on a pension from the Goldsmiths' company. Roberts died on 24 May 1841 at the home of his sole surviving daughter, Keturah. He was buried with Mary in Bunhill Fields on 30 May.

== Published works ==
- Cwyn yn erbyn Gorthrymder (London, 1798) a satirical pamphlet mainly directed against the payment of tithes.
- Amddiffyniad y Methodistiaid (Carmarthen, 1806) against the attacks of Edward Charles.
- An English and Welsh Vocabulary (London, 1827), and a phrase book.
- The Welsh Interpreter (London, 1831, second edition, 1838).
- Y Byd a Ddaw, by Isaac Watts (appeared in 1829) a re-issue of a translation by W. E. Jones (Gwilym Cawrdaf).
- Y Ffordd i Gaffael Cyfoeth neu Rhisiart Druan (London, 1839), based on Benjamin Franklin's Poor Richard.
- He contributed to Welsh newspapers and periodicals of the period in both English and Welsh.
