= Robert Williams (Robert ap Gwilym Ddu) =

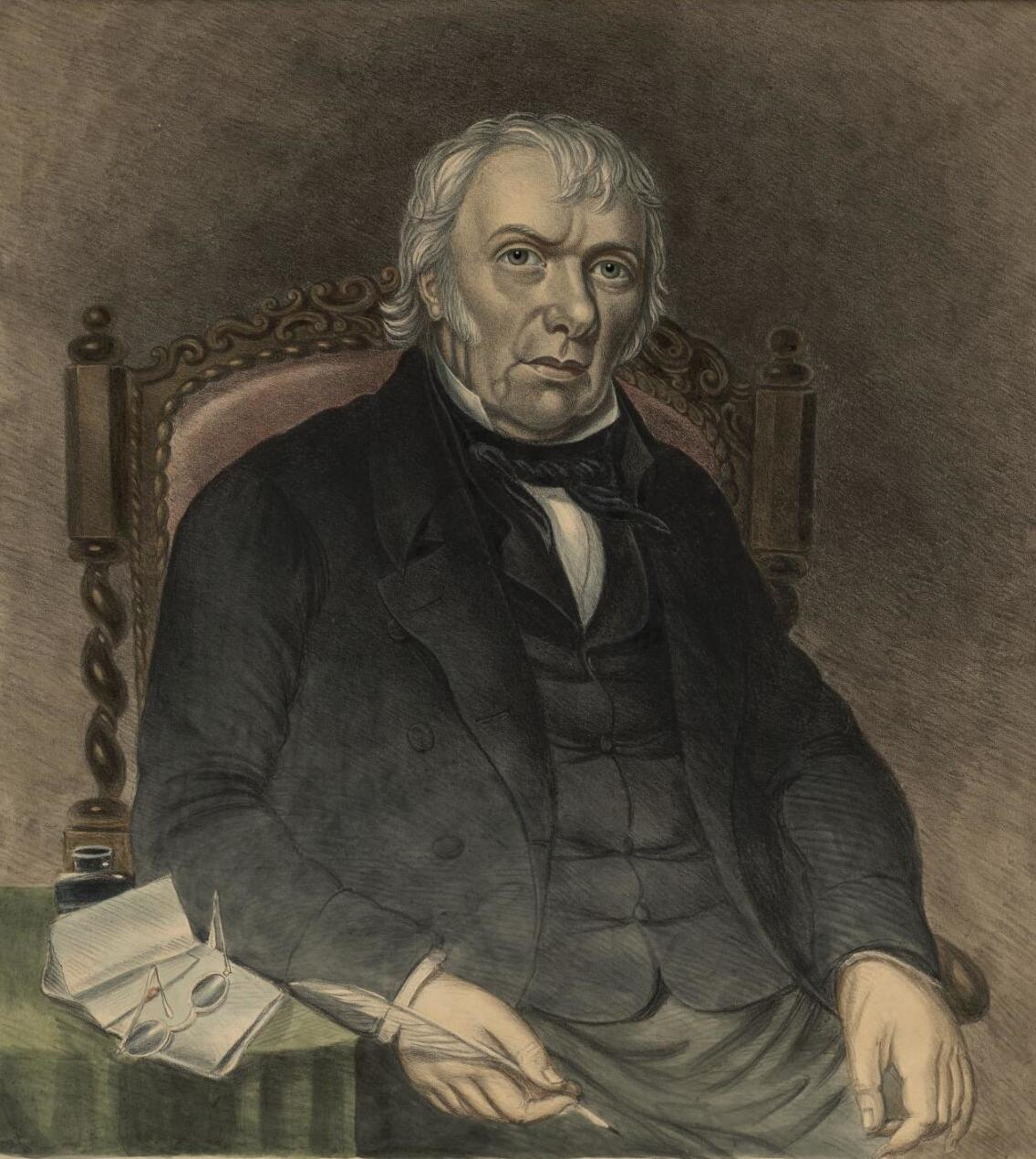
Portrait of Robert Williams

Robert Williams, bardic name Robert ap Gwilym Ddu (1766–1850) was a Welsh bard.

== Life ==
Son of William Williams, he was born at Betws Fawr in the parish of Llanystumdwy, Caernarfonshire. His father was a small freeholder, and he succeeded him in the occupation of Betws Fawr, moving, however, towards the end of his life to Mynachty in the same district.

Williams was a home-loving farmer. A close friend and the bardic tutor of his neighbour David Owen (1784–1841) ("Dewi Wyn o Eifion"), he shared Owen's mistrust of the eisteddfod authorities of the day. He died on 11 June 1850, and was buried at Aber Erch.

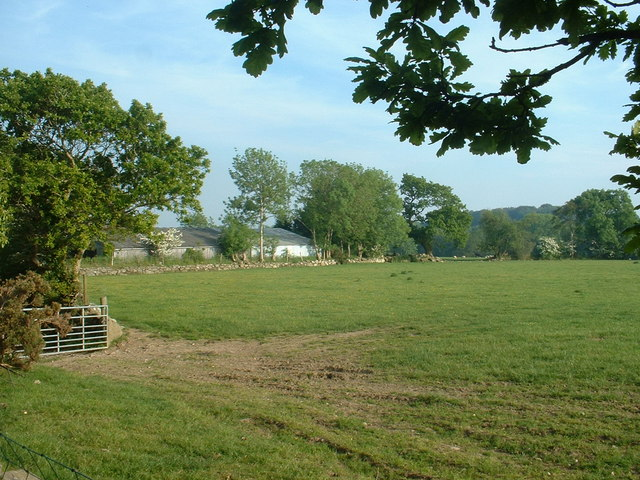
Betws Fawr, home of Robert Williams

== Works ==
"Robert ap Gwilym Ddu", as William was styled, became first known as the winner in 1792 of the Gwyneddigion Society's medal for the best ode on the Massacre of the Bards. He then concentrated on religious verse, and avoided eisteddfodau. His poems, almost entirely religious or commemorative, were published at Dolgelly in 1841 under the title Gardd Eifion; and include some well-known stanzas.

== Family ==
Williams married late in life. His only child, a daughter Jane Elizabeth, died in 1834, at the age of seventeen, and Gardd Eifion contains an elegy upon her.

== Notes ==
Attribution

This article incorporates text from a publication now in the public domain: Lee, Sidney, ed. (1900). "Williams, Robert (1767-1850)". Dictionary of National Biography. Vol. 61. London: Smith, Elder & Co.
