= John Edwards (1747–1792) =

Welsh poet (1747–1792)

John Edwards (Sion Ceiriog) (1747 – September 1792) was a Welsh poet, born at Crogen Wladys in Glyn Ceiriog. He co-founded a London Welsh literary and cultural society.

== Life ==
Edwards, Owen Jones (Myfyr), and Robert Hughes (Robin Ddu o Fon), were the founders of Cymdeithas y Gwyneddigion or the Venedotian Society, in 1770. Sion Ceiriog, as Edwards was called, wrote an awdl (ode) for the meeting of the society on Saint David's Day, 1778. He was its secretary in 1779–1780, and its president in 1783.

Edwards received an honorary medal from the Society of Gwyneddigion in 1780 for a blank-verse elegy to a fellow poet, Richard Morris.

== Memorial ==
Edwards died suddenly in 1792, aged 45. John Jones (Jac Glan-y-gors) contributed memorial verses to the Geirgrawn of June 1796 and wrote: "To the memory of John Edwards, Glynceiriog, in the parish of Llangollen, Denbighshire, who was generally known as Sion Ceiriog, a poet, an orator, and an astronomer, a curious historian of sea and land, a manipulator of musical instruments, a true lover of his country and of his Welsh mother tongue, who, to the great regret of his friends, died and was buried in London, September 1792."
