= 1792 in Great Britain =

Events from the year 1792 in Great Britain.

== Incumbents ==
- Monarch – George III
- Prime Minister – William Pitt the Younger (Tory)
- Foreign Secretary – Lord Grenville

== Events ==
- January – the investment management business which will become the Charles Stanley Group in London is established as a banking partnership in Sheffield.
- 25 January – the radical London Corresponding Society is established.
- 7 March – a settlement is formed in Sierra Leone in West Africa as a home for freed slaves.
- 23 March – Joseph Haydn premieres his Symphony No. 94 (the "Surprise"), the second of his twelve London symphonies, at the Hanover Square Rooms.
- 4 June – Captain George Vancouver claims Puget Sound for Britain.
- 21 June – Iolo Morganwg holds the first Gorsedd ceremony, at Primrose Hill in London.
- September – Macartney Embassy: George Macartney, 1st Earl Macartney, sails from Portsmouth in HMS Lion as the first official envoy from the Kingdom of Great Britain to China.
- 14 September – radical Thomas Paine flees to France after being indicted for treason.
- 29 September – first St Patrick's Church, Soho Square, London (Roman Catholic) consecrated as a chapel.
- 2 October – Baptist Missionary Society is founded in Kettering.
- 18 December – the trial of Thomas Paine in absentia for treason begins. He is outlawed.

=== Undated ===
- Over 300 petitions are presented to Parliament against the slave trade. The House of Commons pledges to abolish the trade "gradually".
- "Year of the Sheep" in the Scottish Highlands: mass emigration of crofters following Clearances for grazing.
- Fox's Libel Act restores to juries the right to determine what constitutes libel; it remains in force until abolition of criminal libel in 2010.
- Henry Walton Smith and his wife Anna establish the newsagent's business in Little Grosvenor Street, London, which will become W H Smith.

== Publications ==
- Thomas Holcroft's Anna St. Ives, the first British Jacobin novel.
- Thomas Paine's second edition of Rights of Man, urging the overthrow of the British monarchy.
- Mary Wollstonecraft's A Vindication of the Rights of Woman, one of the earliest works of feminist literature.

== Births ==
- 10 February – Frederick Marryat, author (died 1848)
- 19 February – Roderick Murchison, geologist (died 1871)
- 7 March – John Herschel, mathematician and astronomer (died 1871)
- 12 April – John Lambton, 1st Earl of Durham (died 1840)
- 25 April – John Keble, churchman and poet (died 1866)
- 17 May – Anne Isabella Milbanke, wife of George Gordon Byron, 6th Baron Byron (died 1860)
- 16 June – John Linnell, painter (died 1882)
- 7 July – William Henry Smith, businessman (died 1865)
- 4 August – Percy Bysshe Shelley, poet (died 1822)
- 13 August – Adelaide of Saxe-Meiningen, queen of William IV (died 1849)
- 18 August – John Russell, 1st Earl Russell, Prime Minister (died 1878)
- 11 November – Mary Anne Disraeli, wife of Benjamin Disraeli (died 1872)
- Probable – Paul Bedford, comedian (died 1871)

== Deaths ==
- 27 January – George Horne, bishop (born 1730)
- 8 February – Hannah Snell, soldier (born 1723)
- 23 February – Sir Joshua Reynolds, painter (born 1723)
- 3 March – Robert Adam, architect (born 1728)
- 10 March – John Stuart, 3rd Earl of Bute, Prime Minister (born 1713)
- 3 April – George Pocock, admiral (born 1706)
- 30 April – John Montagu, 4th Earl of Sandwich, statesman, First Lord of the Admiralty and rake (born 1718)
- 24 May – George Brydges Rodney, 1st Baron Rodney, naval officer (born 1719)
- 4 June – John Burgoyne, general (born 1723)
- 18 July – John Paul Jones, sailor and the United States's first well-known naval fighter in the American Revolution (born 1747)
- 3 August – Richard Arkwright, inventor (born 1732)
- 4 August – John Burgoyne, army officer, playwright and politician (born 1722)
- 5 August – Frederick North, Lord North, Prime Minister (born 1732)
- 28 October – John Smeaton, civil engineer (born 1724)

== See also ==
- 1792 in Wales
