= Thomas Beynon (archdeacon of Cardigan) =

Literary patron and Archdeacon of Cardigan

Thomas Beynon (1744–1833) was Archdeacon of Cardigan and a patron of eisteddfodau and Welsh literature. He was born in Llansadwrn, Carmarthenshire, and attended a local grammar school. His parents were Griffith Beynon and Rachel Beynon (née Thomas).

He was ordained deacon at Abergwili and served as a curate of Cathedine, Brecknock, from 1768 to 1770, being ordained a priest at Hereford while he was a curate at Cathedine. He served as parish priest of Llanfihangel Cilfargen, Llanfihangel Aberbythych and Llandyfeisant from 1770 to 1833, and later as Rector of Llanedi, from 1782 to 1786. He was also Rector of Penboyr (1784–1833), Rural Dean of Emlyn, Prebendary of Clyro in Christ College, Brecon (1796–1833), and Archdeacon of Cardigan (1814–1833).

A number of bards and writers are known to have dedicated books to him, including Daniel Evans (Daniel Ddu o Geredigion).

He died in October 1835, aged 89, and was buried in Llandeilo.
