= John Elwyn =

Welsh painter and educator (1916–1997)

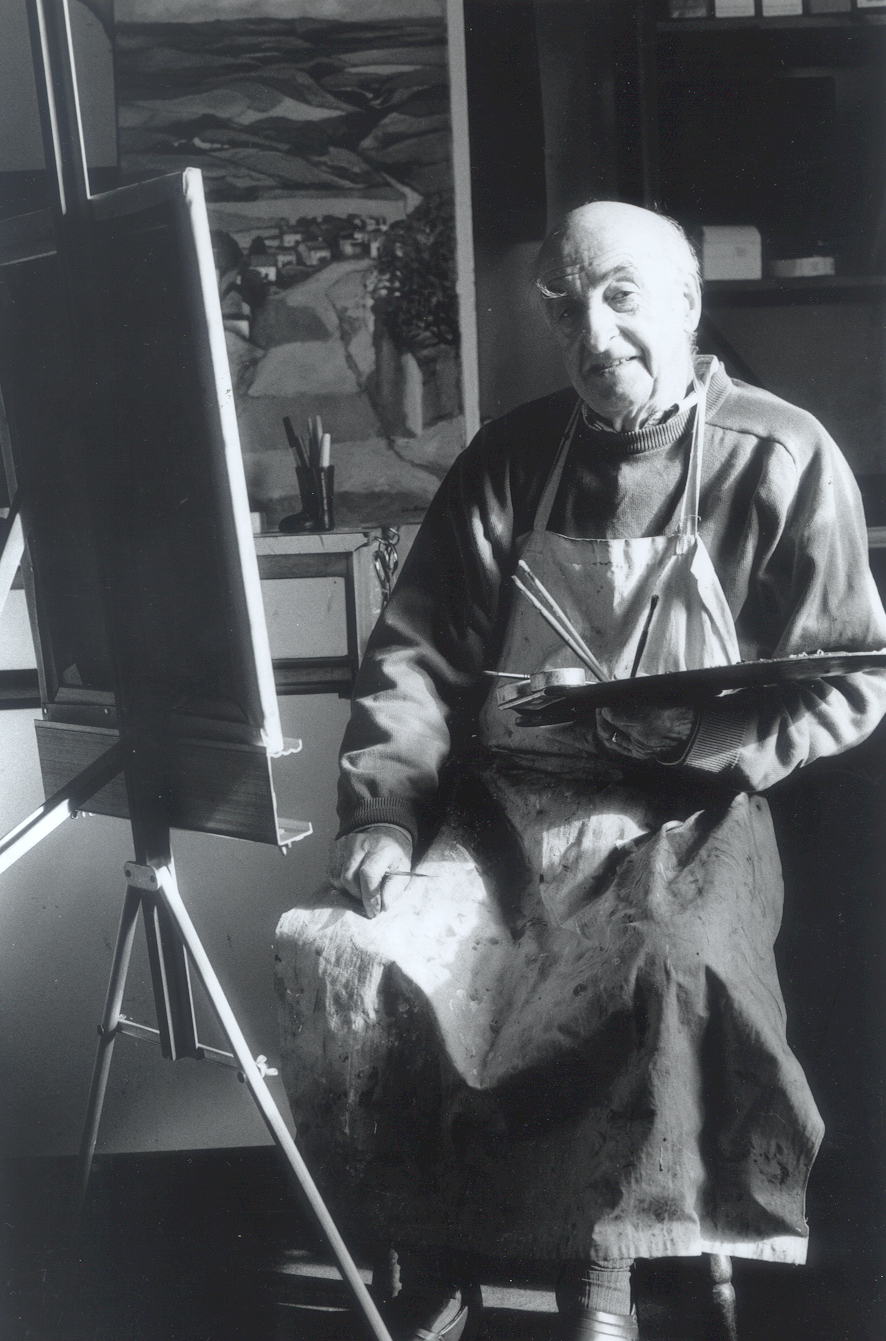
John Elwyn painting a portrait of his biographer Robert Meyrick in 1996

William John Elwyn Davies (20 November 1916 – 13 November 1997), professionally known as John Elwyn, was a Welsh painter, illustrator and educator.

== Early life ==
Davies was born in Adpar, Newcastle Emlyn in rural south Cardiganshire on 20 November 1916. He attended Carmarthen School of Art from 1935 to 1937 and the West of England College of Art in Bristol from 1937 to 1938. He was awarded an exhibition scholarship to the Royal College of Art, London where he trained from 1938 to 1940 and from 1946 to 1947. As a conscientious objector in World War II, he was directed to work on the land – firstly as a forestry worker in the Afan Valley, then from September 1941 in market gardening in a Cardiff Quaker community.

== Career ==
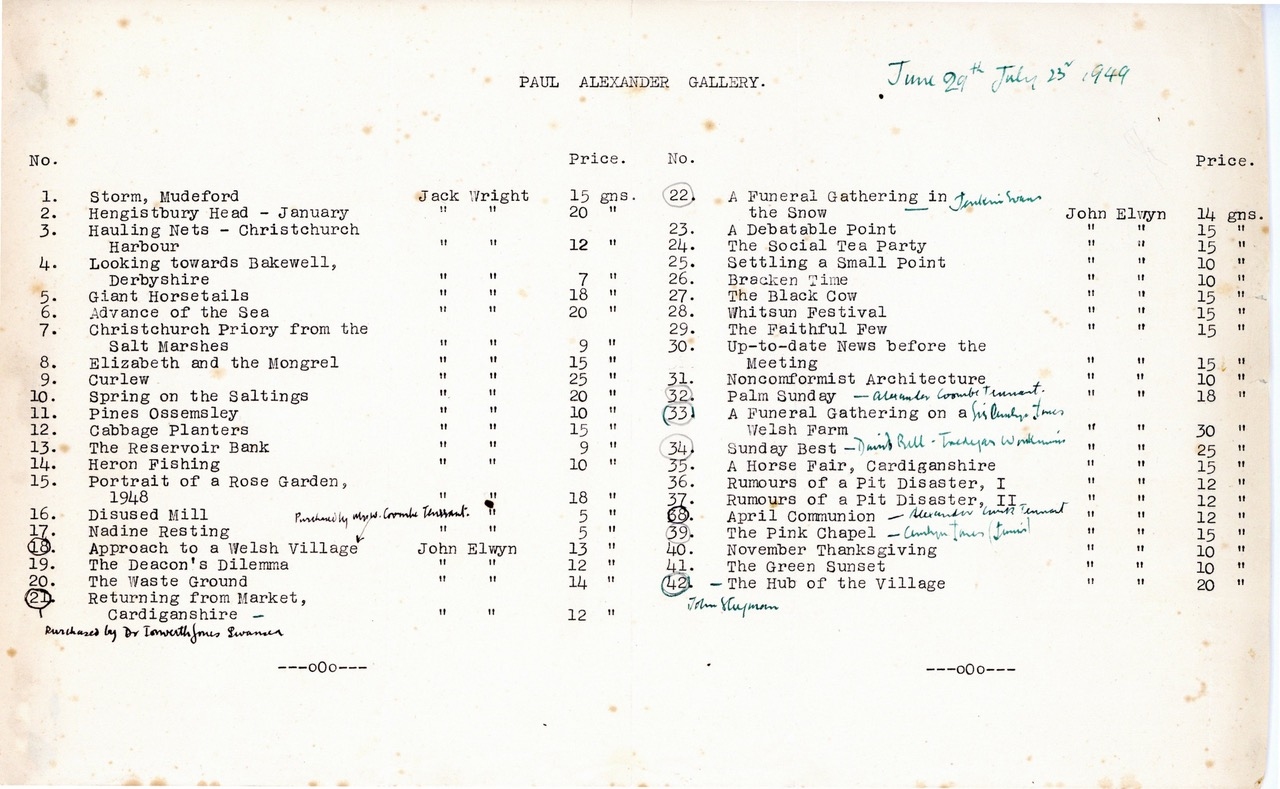
Catalogue and price list for Elwyn's first exhibition, held in 1949 at the Paul Alexander Gallery, London, jointly with Jack Wright. Hand written annotations denote works sold. (Transcription)

After a short time working as a graphic designer for the advertising agency J. Walter Thompson in London, Elwyn moved to Portsmouth, where he taught at the College of Art. In 1949 he began a series of paintings based upon childhood recollections of rural life in Cardiganshire in the 1920s – chapel-going, festivals and funerals.

By the 1950s, Elwyn was exhibiting at the Royal Academy of Arts, at the New English Art Club, and regularly at exhibitions arranged by the Welsh Arts Council. In the early 1950s he made paintings of miners and their surroundings near Pont-Rhyd-y-Fen in the upper Swansea valley, based on his wartime experiences working on the land. His numerous contributions to the annual Pictures for Welsh Schools exhibitions, staged by the Society of Education through Art, which were shown at the National Museum of Wales, Cardiff, between 1950 and 1968.

In 1953 he moved to Winchester, where he taught at the Winchester School of Art. In the same year he made his first illustrations for the Radio Times. Paintings of farm life in Cardiganshire occupied him between 1955 and 1960. In 1956 he was awarded the Gold Medal for Fine Art at the National Eisteddfod in Aberdare. His illustrations for Shell Guides, commissioned by Kenneth Rowntree, were published in 1958.

Between 1960 and 1964, Elwyn worked on paintings that began edging their way towards abstraction. They are based on the seasons and on the growth and felling of trees in Savernake Forest, Wiltshire. Between 1965 and 1969 his paintings drew upon seasonal changes in his garden and the discovery of a world within a world as he examined the inner structures of blooms and seed pods. He staged one-man shows at the Leicester Galleries, London, in 1965 and 1969.

In 1970, after ten years of near abstraction, Elwyn returned to direct representation of his beloved Cardiganshire landscape. That year, he was invited to become an honorary member of the Royal Cambrian Academy. His paintings present an idealised and peaceful vision of country life, recording its activities at different times of day and at various seasons. Memory and imagination are the source of his evocative recreations of the Cardiganshire landscape, with secluded villages, lonely farms, cottages, barns and sweeping country lanes receding in sharp perspective towards the horizon.

John Elwyn retired from Winchester School of Art in 1976.

== Honours ==
John Elwyn was elected in 1979 as a member of the Royal Institute, in 1982 as an Honorary Member of the Gorsedd of Bards, and in 1996 as an Honorary DLitt of the University of Wales. The latter year marked his 80th birthday, for which Aberystwyth University's Robert Meyrick researched and curated a major retrospective of his work for the National Library of Wales.

Elwyn's paintings are testimony to an undiminished love for Wales. Although he lived in Hampshire from 1948, Wales remained his spiritual home and an inspiration for his paintings. He drew continually on his wide experience of the working life of the countryside, the bustling farmyards and cattle pastures of the Teifi and Ceri valleys, and the upland rural areas.

Elwyn died on 13 November 1997, some three weeks after a fall in the garden of his Winchester home. In 2000, the National Library of Wales staged a Memorial Exhibition to coincide with the Scolar Press publication of Robert Meyrick's monograph on John Elwyn.

John Elwyn's paintings developed in subject-matter and character with a distinctly Welsh landscape tradition in a British and European context. They also tell of his family and personal circumstances. In John Elwyn's own words, "All this had nothing to do with esoteric modern art but simply autobiographical illustration. I have a parochial mind – sometimes today it's called regional. I agree with Benjamin Britten when he says 'the important things are the local things.'"

== Personal life ==
Elwyn married the pianist Gillian Butterworth in 1970. His stepchildren were Robin (the composer Robin Stevens) and Louise.
