= Robert Thomas (Ap Vychan) =

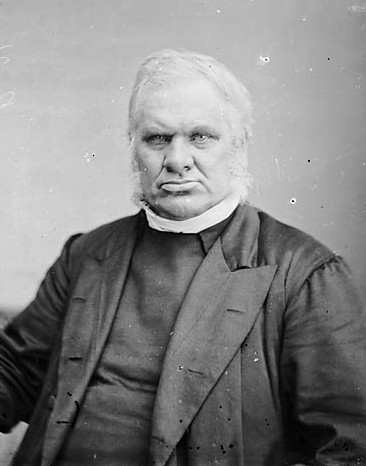
Revd Robert Thomas (Ap Vychan, 1809-80)

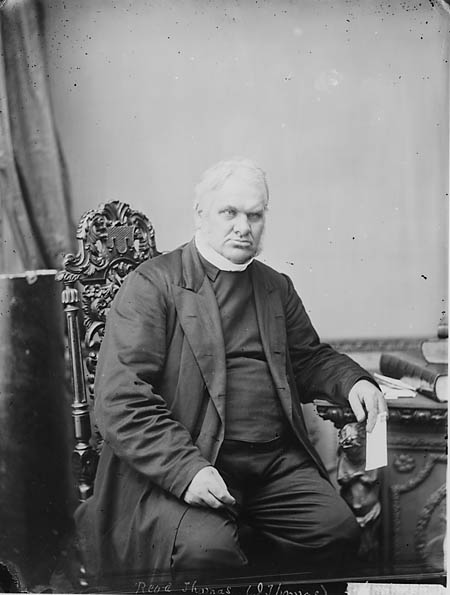
Revd Robert Thomas, Ap Vychan

Robert Thomas (1809 - 1880), also known by the bardic name Ap Vychan, was a Welsh Independent minister, poet and man of letters. He won the chair at the national eisteddfod on two occasions.

== Biography ==
Ap Vychan was the third child of a well-educated man of culture, Dafydd Thomas (Dewi ap Didymus), born 11 August 1809 at Pennantlliw-bach, Llanuwchllyn. He was home schooled by his father, who taught him to write poetry along with reading, writing and counting and, in 1863, Ap Vychan published a memoir of his father in which he recounts his childhood. He was a member of the Cymreigyddion Society of Llanuwchllyn by the time he was fourteen. In 1826, he received a grant that enabled him to serve as apprentice to a local blacksmith. After he completed his apprenticeship he worked in several locations before he moved to Oswestry in May 1830, where he became acquainted with the English language and joined the English church, where he studied the works of Edward Williams, Fuller, and Jonathan Edwards. At the beginning of 1835 he went to Conway and in the summer he preached his first sermon nearby, at Henryd. He was ordained at Dinas Mawddwy on 19 June 1840. Between 1842 and 1848 he was in charge of the Salem chapel at Liverpool. He moved to Bangor in 1855 and remained there until he was appointed tutor in divinity at Bala Independent College. He died on 23 April 1880 and was buried in the churchyard at Llanuwchllyn.
