= Robin Stevens (composer) =

Welsh composer (1958–2026)

Robin Stevens (30 August 1958 – 16 February 2026) was a Welsh composer, cellist and music educator, most active in Manchester.

== Education ==
Stevens was born in Newport, South Wales. His mother was Gillian Butterworth, a piano graduate of the Royal Manchester College of Music. She and his father divorced when Robin was five years old, and in 1970 his mother remarried, to the Welsh landscape artist John Elwyn.

He began playing the cello from the age of eight and started composing in his early teens. He studied music at Dartington College of Arts in Devon for two years and (from 1976) cello at the Royal Northern College of Music in Manchester, with Raphael Sommer and Moray Welsh. While there, he conducted a choral performance of Flos Campi, which had a lasting influence on his music. His harmony teacher at the college was Geoffrey Poole. In 1980, Stevens began two further years of postgraduate study at the University of Birmingham, under John Joubert.

== Church musician, teacher ==
His first major composition was a four-movement String Quintet (1981, rev. 2018), showing the influence of Elgar, Walton, Stravinsky and Vaughan Williams. From 1982, he worked for five years as music director and pastoral worker at St. Paul’s Anglican Church in York, where he focused on composing practical church music for worship there. But towards the end of his time there, he began work on three substantial instrumental chamber works: the Fantasy Sonata for violin and piano; the Sonata Tempesta (also violin and piano; and the Sonata for unaccompanied cello, all written between 1985 and 1987. That year, Stevens took a one-year teaching qualification at Bretton College in West Yorkshire and afterwards taught music at a comprehensive school in Halifax for three years. But in 1990, his health broke down, and he could do little teaching or composition (aside from some smaller pieces) for the next seventeen years.

== Composition ==
Stevens moved from Halifax back to Manchester in 2004, and when his health recovered in 2007, he turned once again to large-scale composition. He enrolled for a PhD course in composition at the University of Manchester, under Philip Grange and later Kevin Malone. From this period come three large single-movement works: the String Quartet No. 1 (2008, showing the influence of Elliott Carter); the Fantasy Trio for flute, guitar and cello (2009); and the Romantic Fantasy for flute, clarinet, string quartet and harp (2010). The String Quartet No. 2, Three Portraits, followed in 2011, commissioned by the Quatour Danel. His first orchestral work was the tone poem Mourning into Dancing (2011-13). Brass Odyssey (2013), for brass band and eight percussionists was the final work in his PhD portfolio.

Pieces composed after 2013 include a Te Deum for chorus and orchestra, a colourful, large-scale Bassoon Concerto (2014-16), many works for unaccompanied cello, and the Sonata Romantica for cello and piano (2019) which experiments with microtones. For a friend, the recorder player John Turner, Stevens composed the five-movement Balmoral Suite, written in pastiche Scottish folk style. Following the Bassoon Concerto came two more large concertos, the Cello Concerto (2020-22) and the Viola Concerto (2022-23).

== Illness and death ==
Stevens was diagnosed with cancer of the colon in 2023. His last major composition was the orchestral tone-poem, Into the Deep, completed in the spring of 2025. Prior to his death he supervised three CDs of his orchestral music, to be issued by Toccata Classics.

He died in February 2026 at Ashlands Nursing Home in Sale. His music is published by Forsyths in Manchester (orchestral and chamber music), Bandmaster (brass instruments) and June Emerson Music (woodwind).

== Recordings ==
- Fire and Inspire, songs (1992, performed by Stevens)
- Whispers in the Wasteland, songs (1994, performed by Stevens)
- Balmoral Suite (and other recorder favourites), Prima Facie PFCD101 (2019)
- Prevailing Winds: Music for Wind Instruments, Divine Art DDA 25194 (2019)
- String Quartets and String Quintet, Divine Art DDA 25203 (2020)
- An Inward Journey, solo cello (2021, performed by Stevens)
- Music for Cello and Piano, Divine Art DDA 25217 (2022)
- Chasing Shadows, chamber music, Divine Art DDA 25236 (2023)
- Further Along An Inward Journey, solo cello (2023, performed by Stevens)
- Brass Odyssey, World of Sound WOS176 (2025)
- A Questing Soul: music for violin and piano, Divine Art DDX 21121 (2025)
- Orchestral Music, Toccata Classics
  - Vol. 1, includes Bassoon Concerto, TOCC0758 (2026)
  - Vol. 2, includes Cello Concerto and Into the Deep, TOCC0764 (2026)
  - Vol. 3, includes Viola Concerto and Mourning into Dancing, TOCC0788 (2026)
