= Thomas Richards of Coychurch =

Welsh curate and lexicographer

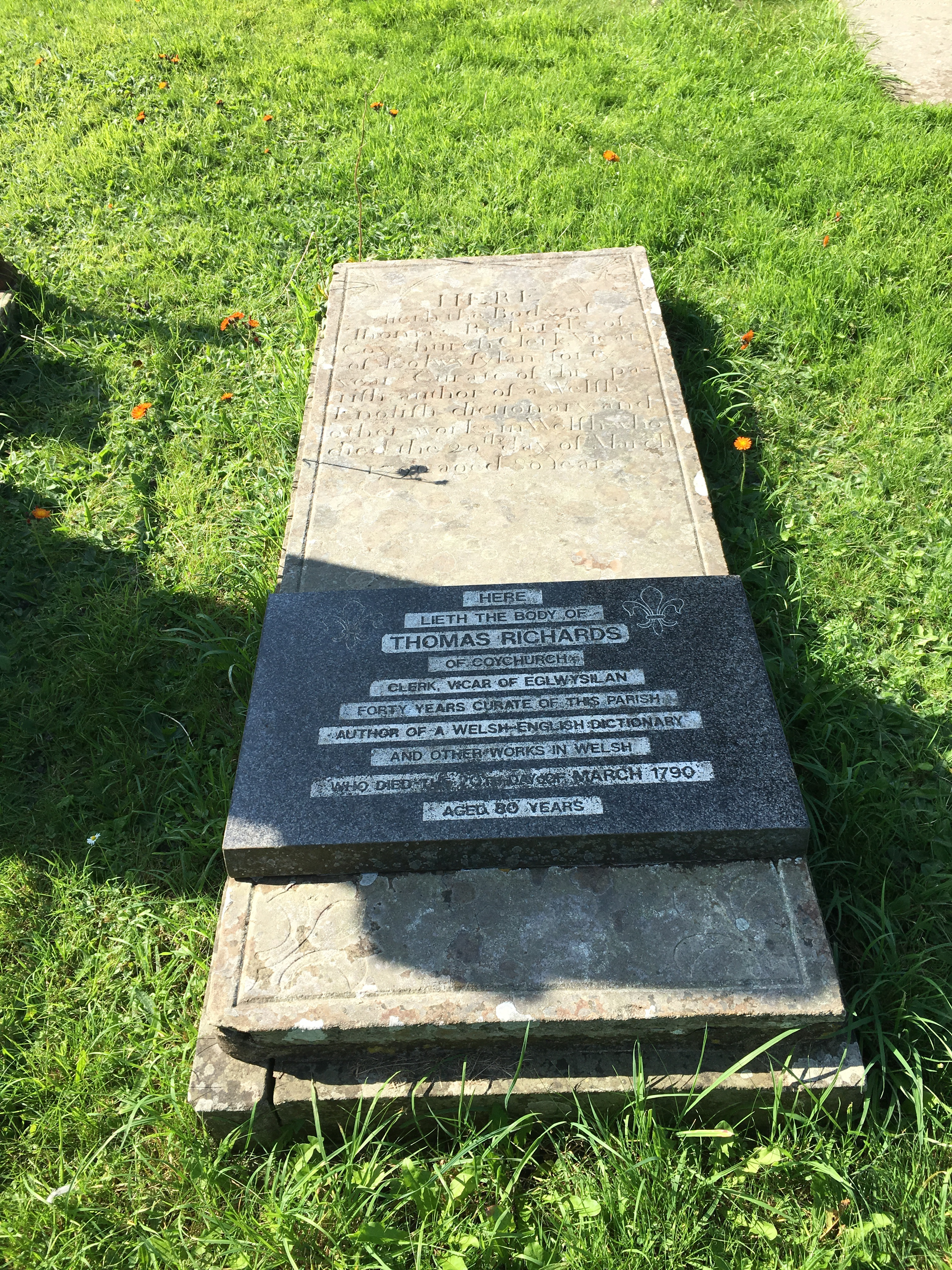
right Tomb of Thomas Richards in Coychurch, now a Grade ii listed monument

Thomas Richards (c. 1710 – 20 March 1790) was a Welsh curate from Coychurch in the eighteenth century, best known for his 1753 Thesaurus, a Welsh-English dictionary. The Welsh-English dictionary was used by Dr. Samuel Johnson in compiling A Dictionary of the English Language (1755).

== Life ==
Born about 1710 in Glamorganshire, served for forty years the curacy of Coychurch (Llan Grallo) and Coity in that county. Richards died on 20 March 1790.

== Works ==
In 1746 Richards published a Welsh translation of a tract on the Cruelties and Persecutions of the Church of Rome, by Philip Morant. His major work was Antiquæ Linguæ Britannicæ Thesaurus, Bristol, 1753, a Welsh-English Dictionary, with a Welsh grammar prefixed, dedicated to Frederick, Prince of Wales. Based mainly on the work of John Davies and Edward Llwyd, his dictionary was fuller than any which had yet appeared. Other sources were William Wotton and Richard Morris. It has been suggested that Richards borrowed manuscripts from John Bradford. A second edition appeared at Trefriw in 1815, a third in the same year at Dolgellau, and a fourth at Merthyr Tydfil in 1838.

Richards was posthumously credited with contributions to the edition of William Evans's English-Welsh dictionary published in 1812.
