= Myles Davies =

Welsh priest and author

Myles Davies (1662 – 1715 or 1716) was a Welsh author. He published the Athenae Britannicae in 1716.

== Biography ==
Davies was a native of Whiteford, near Holywell in Flintshire, Wales. His parents George and Elizabeth Davies lived in Tre'r Abbot. Isaac D'Israeli said his biography was quite unknown. He was educated at the English Jesuit College in Rome, and was made a Roman Catholic priest on 17 April 1688. He left Rome on 15 October 1688 to work with the Jesuits in Wales, but soon converted to Protestantism, and in 1705 published an explanation (apologia) for his surprising conversion in The Recantation of Mr Pollett, A Roman priest.

The preface to one of his books describes him as "a gentleman of the Inns of Court". He was a learned and erudite scholar, but eccentric to the verge of insanity.

In 1715, he published the first volume of his Athenae Britannicae, a critical history of pamphlets called Icon Libellorum. It was described as "a queer production, but cram full of curious information". The Libellorum included a letter written in French and a Latin ode to Robert Harley, first Earl of Oxford.

Davies became a mendicant scholar, selling his own books. He would visit the house of a potential patron and send in a bundle of his books, with perhaps an ode to the recipient, in the hope of receiving a gift in return. He was often rejected or insulted when trying to obtain payment or return of his work. By 1812, his work was described as extremely rare.

Some 50 facsimile pages were selected by R George Thomas, of University College Cardiff, and published with a biographical introduction in 1962 by the Augustan Reprint Society which was based then at the William Andrews Clark Memorial Library of the University of California at Los Angeles.
