= Philanthropic Order of True Ivorites =

The Philanthropic Order of True Ivorites, commonly referred to as the Ivorites Society or the Ivorites (Welsh: Yr Iforiaid), was a friendly society founded in Wrexham, Wales, in 1836.

== History ==
The Order of True Ivorites was founded by Thomas Robert Jones (1802–1856) and was named after Ifor Hael, one of Dafydd ap Gwilym's patrons. The society's motto was 'Cyfeillgarwch, Cariad a Gwirionedd' (English: Friendship, Love and Truth), and it was the only friendly society which conducted its business exclusively in Welsh. As well as helping the poor and needy, the order furthered the Welsh language through organising local Eisteddfodau. In The Laws and Regulations of the Order, published in 1839, states that the True Ivorites Society is an institution 'to encourage the Welsh language, to preserve its members as far as possible from want'. The laws also stated that 'all books and accounts belonging to this Society be kept in the Welsh Language'. These laws were then amended in 1858, when the ruling regarding the usage of Welsh stating that the secretaries of the lodges should be competent in record keeping in both English and Welsh. This reflects the competition from other societies and the change in the number of Welsh speakers in Glamorgan during the later nineteenth century.

The Ivorites, along with fellow friendly society the Oddfellows, were especially strong in Glamorgan, and survived well into the twentieth century. The societies were often a substitute for trade unions, but were never a threat to the unions' existence; unions tended to grow out of the activities of the friendly societies.

The Ivorites had their own handsigns and handshakes which were published in a booklet.

== Bibliography ==
- Morgan, Prys (1988). Glamorgan County History, Volume VI, Glamorgan Society 1780 to 1980. Cardiff: University of Wales Press. ISBN 0-904730-05-0.
