= Ioan Tegid =

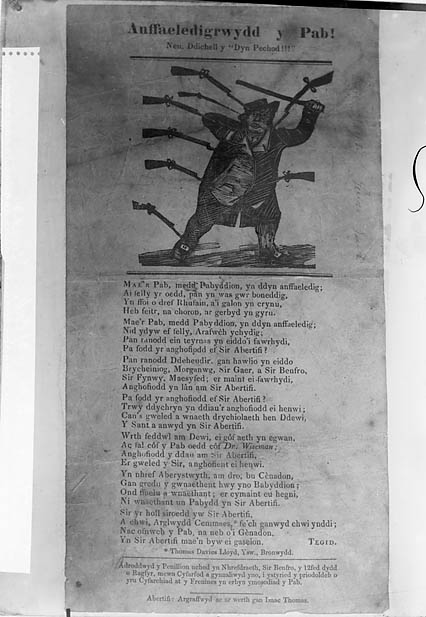
A ballad pamphlet by Tegid: "Anffaeledigrwydd y Pab!" ("Papal Infallibility")

John Jones (10 February 1792 – 2 May 1852), commonly known by his bardic name of Ioan Tegid or simply Tegid, was a Welsh clergyman and writer.

He was born at Bala and educated there and at the grammar school in Carmarthen, going on to Jesus College, Oxford. In 1819 he was ordained and became chaplain of Christ Church, Oxford. A scholar of the Welsh language, he was closely associated with both Lady Charlotte Guest and Lady Llanover. He was also a Hebrew scholar, publishing a translation of the Book of Isaiah in 1830. Tegid won a cup at the Cardiff Eisteddfod of 1834. In 1842 he moved to Nevern in Pembrokeshire and in 1848 became a canon at St Davids Cathedral. His poetry was published posthumously, in collected form, with a very short biography, by his sister's son the Rev. Henry Roberts, in 1859.

== Works ==
- Traethawd ar Gadwedigaeth yr Iaith Gymraeg ("An essay on Welsh Language Preservation", 1820)
