= Adpar =

Village in Ceredigion, Wales

Coordinates: 52.041°N 4.467°W

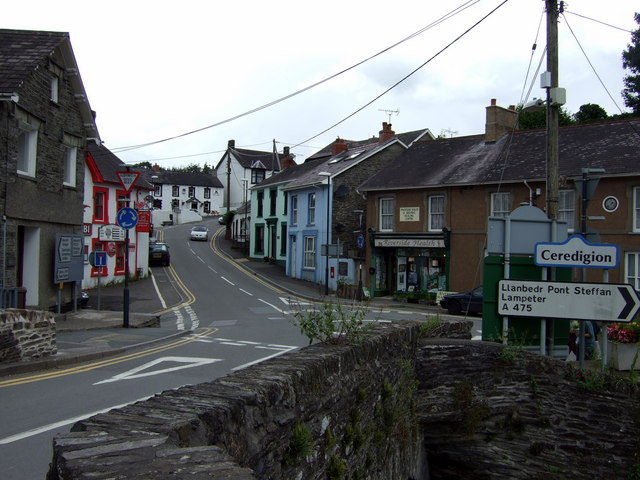
- Looking over the bridge across the Teifi to Adpar

- Location within Ceredigion
- OS grid reference: SN309409
- Community: Llandyfriog
- Principal area: Ceredigion
- Preserved county: Dyfed
- Country: Wales
- Sovereign state: United Kingdom
- Post town: NEWCASTLE EMLYN
- Postcode district: SA38
- Dialling code: 01239
- Police: Dyfed-Powys
- Fire: Mid and West Wales
- Ambulance: Welsh
- UK Parliament: Ceredigion Preseli
- Senedd Cymru – Welsh Parliament: Ceredigion

Adpar (standardised as Atpar bilingually) is a village in Ceredigion, Wales, in the community of Llandyfriog, now considered as a part of Newcastle Emlyn, to which it is joined by a bridge across the River Teifi. The village was also known as Trefhedyn and was a borough in its own right.

== History ==
The Royal Commission on the Ancient and Historical Monuments of Wales records a "possible medieval castle motte" within the village. The mound is low, about 3.5 metres in height and damaged in subsequent periods.

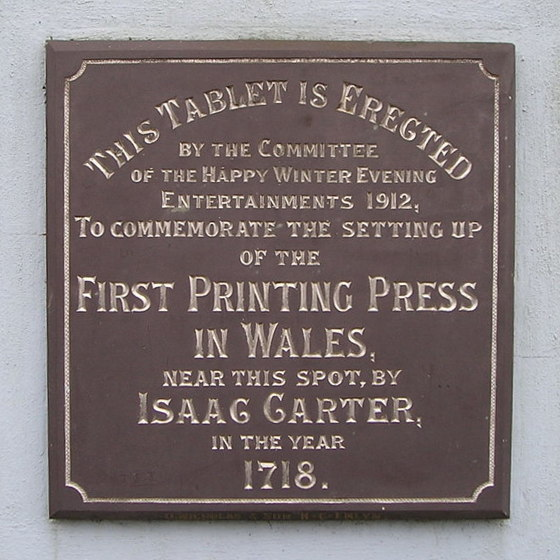
Plaque marking the establishment of the first printing press in Wales

At one time Adpar was relatively more important than it is now. It was an ancient borough, returned its own member of parliament, and had a Portreeve and two bailiffs. It had a market and several seasonal animal fairs. Several industrial enterprises used the fast-flowing waters of the River Teifi for power, including a woollen mill that produced flannel, blankets and knitting yarn. There was also a fishing weir above the bridge to catch migratory salmon.

The first permanent printing press was established in Adpar in 1718 by Isaac Carter (printer and native of Carmarthenshire). It is believed that the first two publications from this press were Welsh language Cân o Senn i'w hen Feistr Tobacco ("song from Senn to his old master, tobacco") by Alban Thomas and Cân ar Fesur Triban ynghylch Cydwybod a’i Chynheddfau ("Song in triplet measure concerning conscience and its qualities"). The press was transferred to Carmarthen in about 1725.

The last duel that took place in Cardiganshire occurred in Adpar in 1814.

== Notable people ==
In birth order:

- John Elwyn (1916–1997), British painter, illustrator and educator
