= Cymreigyddion Society =

18th–19th-century Welsh society in London

The Cymreigyddion Society (Welsh: Cymdeithas y Cymreigyddion) was a London-based Welsh social, cultural and debating society, which existed from 1794 or 1795 until about 1855.

== History ==
The Cymreigyddion Society was stated in later accounts to have been founded in 1795, although a reference to a meeting on 19 November 1794 suggests that it may have assembled informally at a slightly earlier date. It was established by a group of twelve expatriate Welshmen resident in London, most if not all of whom were members of the existing Gwyneddigion Society (founded 1770), and who included Jac Glan-y-gors (John Jones). At a slightly later date Iolo Morganwg (Edward Williams) was also a member.

The last record of the Society's existence, when it was clearly barely surviving, is from 1855. It had disappeared by 1858.

== Activities ==
The Society's Rules appear to have been settled in 1797, printed in 1798, and revised in 1810 and 1827. Meetings were held regularly on Thursday evenings, and mainly consisted of debates which, in the early days, seems to have been what distinguished the Cymreigyddion from the Gwyneddigion, among whom debating had fallen into abeyance. Other activities included a strong social element and the dispensing of charity. Proceedings were held in both Welsh and English, and one of the Society's objects was the teaching of English to Welsh newcomers to London. In its later years it held lectures and organised eisteddfodau, and seems to have acquired a radical political character.

The Society was (like the Gwyneddigion) anti-Methodist, and revelled in the disgrace of the preacher Edward "Ginshop" Jones, who was sued in a breach of promise case in 1801. It published a 24-page booklet containing the texts of Jones's love-letters, which had been read out in court, and a ribald ballad about the affair by Glan-y-gors.

The Cymreigyddion always seems to have been a more "democratic" body than the Gwyneddigion, and in the early 19th century, as the Gwyneddigion fell into decline, the Cymreigyddion to some extent took over the membership of the older society.

== Legacy ==
The name Cymreigyddion was adopted by several literary and cultural societies in Wales itself in the early part of the 19th century, probably in conscious imitation of the London society. The Cymreigyddion y Fenni of Abergavenny, which was founded in 1833, is still in existence.
