= Edward Hughes (poet) =

British poet (1772–1850)

Edward Hughes (1772 – 11 February 1850) was a Welsh clergyman and prize-winning Welsh language poet, whose bardic name was Y Dryw ("The wren").

== Life ==
Hughes was born in Nannerch, Flintshire, north Wales and christened on 4 July 1772. He matriculated at Jesus College, Oxford in 1794, obtaining his Bachelor of Arts degree in 1797 and his Master of Arts degree in 1800. He was ordained and was a military chaplain for a time, including service on the Walcheren Campaign of 1809. He was later rector of Llanddulas (1814–1818) and then of Bodfari (1818 until his death in 1850). He won the prize at the eisteddfod in Denbigh in 1819 for an awdl called "Elusengarwch", the adjudication being by William Owen Pughe, Robert Davies (Bardd Nantglyn) and David Richards (Dewi Silyn), although the result was controversial as many others favoured David Owen (Dewi Wyn o Eifion). Hughes won a prize offered by the Honourable Society of Cymmrodorion in 1822 for a cywydd called "Hu Gadarn" and again won prizes in the Denbigh eisteddfod of 1828, when John Blackwell (Alun) was among the adjudicators. His poems were published in various contemporary collections. He died in Bodfari on 11 February 1850, and was buried on 15 February 1850.
