= William Evans (lexicographer) =

Welsh minister and lexicographer

William Evans (d. circa 1776) was a Welsh minister and lexicographer.

== Life ==
Evans came from Cefn-gwilli, Llanedi in Carmarthen and was educated at Carmarthen College under Dr. Jenkins, 1767–72. He was for some years pastor of the Presbyterian congregation at Sherborne, but by March 1776 he had accepted a post at Moretonhampstead, Devon. He only spent seven weeks there, leaving on 12 May due to ill health., and probably died shortly after.

== Works ==
His claim to noticeability is his English-Welsh dictionary, compiled while he was a student and published in 1771. A second edition appeared in 1812. The Welsh bibliographer Daniel Silvan Evans found some merit in it.
