= Thomas Davies (physician) =

Welsh physician

- Born: 1792; Carmarthenshire
- Died: 30 May 1839 (aged 46–47)
- Occupation: Physician

Thomas Davies (1792 – 30 May 1839) was a Welsh physician.

== Biography ==
Davies was born in 1792 in Carmarthenshire, and, after some schooling in London, was apprenticed to his maternal uncle, then apothecary to the London Hospital. He became an apothecary, and practised at the east end of London, but after two years had symptoms of phthisis. He went to Montpellier for his health, and afterwards to Paris, where he learned the then new art of auscultation, under René Laennec, its inventor. He graduated M.D. at Paris 8 December 1821, came back to London, was admitted a licentiate of the Royal College of Physicians 30 September 1824, and began practice at 30 New Broad Street, London, as a physician. He lectured at his house on diseases of the lungs and heart, and explained all he had learned from Laennec. The lectures brought him professional repute, and he was elected the first assistant physician to the London Hospital 5 December 1827, and became a fellow of the College of Physicians 4 July 1838. He was made lecturer on the practice of physic at the London Hospital, and printed in the ‘London Medical Gazette’ a course of lectures on diseases of the chest, which he published in an octavo volume of more than five hundred pages in 1835, entitled ‘Lectures on the Diseases of the Lungs and Heart.’ The book shows that its author had mastered and tested for himself all the observations of Laennec and of Hope, but he added nothing to what they had taught, and though he writes at length on pericarditis, and had examined many examples post mortem, he was ignorant of the existence of a pericardial friction-sound in such cases. He was married and had several children, but his chest disease returned, and he died of it 30 May 1839. He used habitually to say to his patients ‘Keep up your spirits,’ and had sad experience of the need for such advice in his own last illness, when he suffered much from mental depression. He was buried in the churchyard of St. Botolph's, Bishopsgate.
