= Evan Hughes =

American bass-baritone opera singer

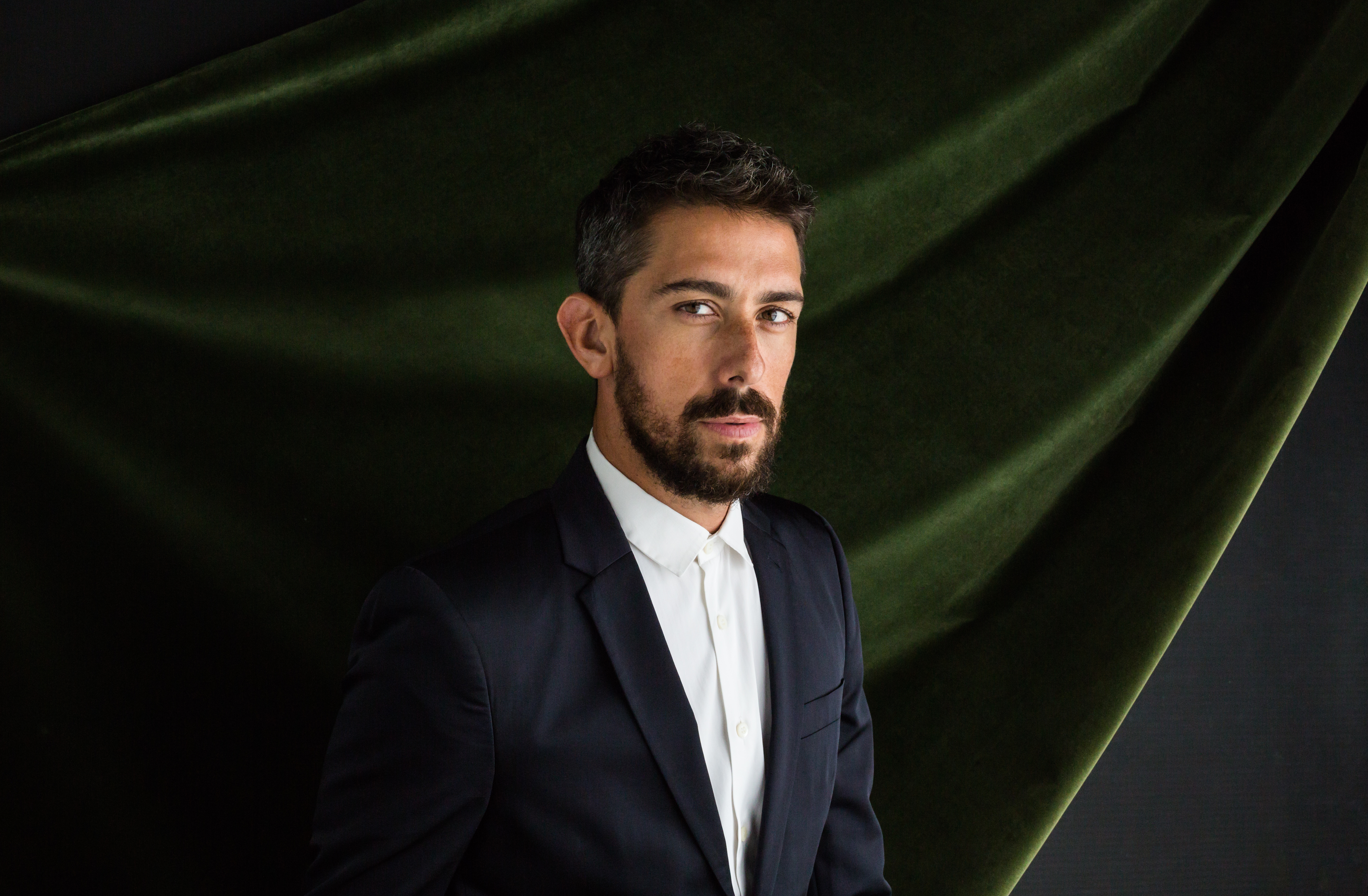
- Born: Santa Barbara, California
- Occupation: Opera singer (bass)

Evan Hughes is an American operatic bass-baritone.

== Early life ==
Evan Hughes grew up in Santa Barbara, California. His mother was a trained soprano and a voice teacher, and his father was a buildings and grounds manager at the Music Academy of the West. Evan Hughes earned a Bachelor's Degree in Music from University of California, Los Angeles, a Master's Degree in Music from the Curtis Institute of Music.

== Early career ==
From 2010 to 2013, Evan Hughes was a member of the Lindemann Young Artist development program at the Metropolitan Opera. Since then he began his career in Europe as a member of the Sächsische Staatsoper in Dresden, appearing on stage at Opernhaus Zürich, Metropolitan Opera, Komische Oper Berlin, Staatsoper Hamburg, Teatro Massimo, the Dutch National Opera and at the Festival d'Aix-En-Provence.

== Career ==
Hughes has performed such roles as Figaro in The Marriage of Figaro in San Diego Opera, Nick Shadow in The Rake's Progress at the Aix-en-Provence Festival and Leporello in Don Giovanni in the Zurich Opera House

Other roles also include Gobrias in Belshazzar at the Zurich Opera.

As a committed interpreter of modern music, Hughes has focused particularly on the works of Elliott Carter and Matthias Pintscher. He has premiered two roles in the operas by the composer George Benjamin: "the Protector" in Written on Skin in Elbphilharmonie Hamburg and the Berlin Philharmonic, as well as "the King" in Lessons in Love and Violence with the conductor Kent Nagano. He premiered Carter’s last vocal works including performances with James Levine and the Met Chamber Ensemble at Carnegie Hall and at the Tanglewood music festival. He recorded Matthias Pintscher’s “Songs from Solomon’s Garden” with Ensemble Intercontemporain.
