= Thomas Ellis (priest, died 1792) =

Welsh priest, died 1792

Thomas Ellis (1711 or 1712 – 23 February 1792) was a Welsh clergyman.

== Life ==
Ellis was born in Meliden, Flintshire, in North Wales. He was educated at Jesus College, Oxford, matriculating on 5 February 1728 at the age of 16. He obtained his B.A. degree in 1731, and a B.D. degree in 1741. He was a Fellow of the college from 1731 to 1761, becoming Senior Fellow. In 1737, the college appointed him as curate of the church in Holyhead, Anglesey, where he was a supporter of the schools of Griffith Jones, making efforts to see that the schools were regarded by the local people as Anglican rather than Methodist or Dissenting views. He published a warning against schism in 1746, Byr Grynhoad o'r Grefydd Gristionogol, and asked John Wesley (who visited Holyhead in March 1748) to make it clear that Wesley was advising Methodists not to leave the Church. This led to Wesley's A Word to a Methodist, which Ellis translated into Welsh and had printed in Dublin as Gair i'r Methodist.

Ellis helped to promote the 1746 SPCK edition of the Welsh Bible, having earlier suggested that Richard Morris be asked to supervise its production. He was a corresponding member of the Honourable Society of Cymmrodorion, set up by the Morris brothers. In 1759, Jesus College appointed him to the parish of Nutfield, Surrey and his increased stipend meant that he could then afford to resign his fellowship and marry (which he did in 1762, having two children). Ellis died on 23 February 1792 in Nutfield at the age of 80.
