= Dewi Nantbrân =

18th-century Welsh friar and writer

Dewi Nantbrân (real name David or Dewi Powell; died 1781) was a Welsh Friar Minor. He wrote the "Catechism Byrr o'r Athrawiaeth Ghristnogol" (London, 1764), a short catechism of Christian doctrine in the Welsh language.

Powell, who came from Abergavenny, was described by Meic Stephens as the most notable Catholic writer of his century for his three Welsh-language books.
