= Christmas Samuel =

Welsh minister and writer

Christmas Samuel (1674 – 18 June 1764) was a Welsh Independent minister and writer.

He was born in Llanegwad, Carmarthenshire, into a relatively prosperous family. He began to preach at an early age, and by 1707 was in charge of the church at Panteg, though he was as yet unordained. He was ordained on 23 September 1711 at the request of his congregation. He was a supporter of Griffith Jones (Llanddowror) in the campaign for circulating schools.

He either wrote, co-authored or was involved in the publication of several works published in the Welsh language by a press at Trefhedyn in Cardiganshire. About five years before his death, he went blind.

== Works ==
- Catecism o'r Scrythur (1719)
- Lloffion y Gwr Tywyll (1759)
