= Edward Davies (Celtic) =

Welsh writer and clergyman (1756–1831)

Edward "Celtic" Davies (7 June 1756 – 7 January 1831) was a Welsh writer and Anglican clergyman whose most influential work examined the origins of Celtic languages and the meaning of Celtic mythology. It became part of the 19th-century recovery and reinvention of druidic tradition.

Born in Llanfaredd, Radnorshire, Davies attended Christ College, Brecon (alongside his friend, the historian Theophilus Jones). He was the curate of Olveston, Gloucestershire and in 1805 was made rector of Bishopston, Gower.

Davies produced a number of collections of poetry and plays but it was his writings on myth and history which were most successful. Influential in their time and later, his historical works are wildly inaccurate and speculative by modern standards. He was not fluent in Welsh and used unreliable sources and guesswork in his attempt to make Celtic myth correspond with biblical history. But unlike his contemporary Iolo Morganwg, Davies was not guilty of deliberate forgery; indeed, he was one of the few at the time who were suspicious of some of Iolo's work, which led to a literary feud between them. However, like most of his contemporaries, Davies fell for a number of Iolo's frauds, which further undermines the reliability of his work. He did however publish a discourse on the authenticity of Ossian in 1825. One keen reader of Davies' books who was interested in his theories was William Blake. Davies' status in his day is demonstrated by the fact that he was one of the first ten writers selected by the newly established Royal Society of Literature to be awarded the honour of "Companion of Literature" in 1823.

== Works ==
- Celtic Researches on the Origin, Traditions and Languages of the Ancient Britons (1804)
- The Mythology and Rites of the British Druids (1809)
