= Gwyneddigion Society =

London-based Welsh literary and cultural society

The Gwyneddigion Society (Welsh: Cymdeithas y Gwyneddigion) was a London-based Welsh literary and cultural society. The original society was founded in 1770 and wound up in 1843. It was briefly revived in 1978. Its proceedings were conducted through the medium of Welsh.

== History ==
The Gwyneddigion Society was founded in December 1770 by a group of expatriate Welshmen resident in London, its first formal meeting taking place on 4 February 1771. Foremost of the founders was Owen Jones (known as Owain Myfyr), who became the society's first president. Originally from Llanfihangel Glyn Myfyr, Jones had moved to London as a young man and had earned his fortune as a furrier. Other notable early members included Iolo Morganwg (Edward Williams), William Owen Pughe, Jac Glan-y-gors (John Jones), Siôn Ceiriog (John Edwards), Edward Jones ("Bardd y Brenin"), and Twm o'r Nant (Thomas Edwards). Although the society's name (meaning "Gwynedd scholars") suggests a particular link with the region of Gwynedd, its affiliations were from the start with the whole of North Wales, and later with all parts of Wales.

It seems likely that the society was formed in part in reaction to the perceived social and intellectual elitism of the existing London Welsh societies, notably the Honourable Society of Cymmrodorion (although there was in practice considerable overlap between the membership and the officials of the various societies). The emphasis in the early years was on sociability, music (including harp-playing and penillion-singing), and pleasure. The society's principal meeting-place was the Bull's Head Tavern in Walbrook, and one member, David Samwell, wrote:

In Walbrook stands a famous Inn
Near ancient Watling Street
Well stored with brandy, beer and gin,
Where Cambrians nightly meet.

Under rules adopted in 1777, every member had to be Welsh-speaking, and had to avow a fondness for singing, or at least for hearing poetry sung to the harp. However, the society rapidly adopted a more broadly cultural, and specifically a literary, role. When the Cymmrodorion Society was dissolved in 1787, its presidential chair was passed to the Gwyneddigion Society. One member described the Bull's Head between 1790 and 1815 as the "centre of Welsh literary life" ("canolfan bywyd llenyddol ein gwlad").

The society promoted annual eisteddfodau in Wales, the precursors of the National Eisteddfod (the first being held at Bala in 1789); but these experienced difficulties, and the experiment was abandoned after 1793. It had its own library, and maintained contact with scholars across Wales, such as William Jones, to aid them in their knowledge gathering. It also offered an annual prize for literature, in the form of a silver medal. Most significantly, the society (with the financial backing of Owen Jones) published important Welsh literary texts, including Barddoniaeth Dafydd ab Gwilym (1789) and The Myvyrian Archaiology of Wales (1801–07).

A noteworthy event in the society's early history was its funding in the 1790s of John Evans' exploration of North America in search of the legendary "Welsh Indians", the supposed descendants of Madog ab Owain Gwynedd.

From the beginning of the 19th century the society began a slow decline, and by the mid-1830s it had been effectively subsumed into the Cymreigyddion Society (founded in 1795). It was formally dissolved in 1843.

== Revival ==
A new Gwyneddigion Society was formed in London in 1978, but it is not known to have survived.

== Bibliography ==
- Davies, John; Jenkins, Nigel; Baines, Menna; Lynch, Peredur I., eds. (2008). The Welsh Academy Encyclopaedia of Wales. Cardiff: University of Wales Press. ISBN 978-0-7083-1953-6.
- Jenkins, R.T.; Ramage, Helen M. (1951). A History of the Honourable Society of Cymmrodorion and of the Gwyneddigion and Cymreigyddion Societies (1751–1951). Y Cymmrodor. Vol. 50. London: Honourable Society of Cymmrodorion. pp. 91–128.
- Jones, Emrys, ed. (2001). The Welsh in London, 1500–2000. Cardiff: University of Wales Press. pp. 74–7. ISBN 0708317103.
- Leathart, W.D. (1831). The Origin and Progress of the Gwyneddigion Society of London, instituted MDCCLXX. London.
- Lloyd, Sir John Edward; Jenkins, R.T., eds. (1959). The Dictionary of Welsh Biography, down to 1940. London: Honourable Society of Cymmrodorion.
