= Robert Thomas Jenkins =

Welsh historian and academic (1881–1969)

Robert Thomas Jenkins CBE (31 August 1881 – 11 November 1969), often styled R. T. Jenkins, was a Welsh historian and academic.

== Life ==
Jenkins was born on 31 August 1881 in Liverpool. He moved with his family to Bangor, Gwynedd, when his father was appointed clerk to the registrar of the newly established University College of North Wales. However, both of his parents had died by 1888 and he was then brought up by his maternal grandparents in Bala, Gwynedd. He was baptised by Thomas Charles Edwards and studied at Bala Grammar School before winning a scholarship to the University College of Wales, Aberystwyth, obtaining a first-class degree in English in 1901. He then studied history and English at Trinity College, Cambridge before teaching in Llandysul (1904), in Brecon (1904 to 1917) and at the City of Cardiff High School for Boys (1917 to 1930). Whilst he was a teacher, his interest in history deepened and he began to start writing articles on historical topics.

In 1928, he published a history of Wales in the 18th century, with further books following in 1930, the year that he was appointed a lecturer at the University of Wales Bangor. He was assistant editor, then joint editor, of Y Bywgraffiadur Cymreig and its English-language counterpart, The Dictionary of Welsh Biography, writing over 600 entries. He was appointed to a professorship at Bangor in 1945 and retired from the university in 1948, although he continued to work.

He co-wrote a history of the Honourable Society of Cymmrodorion in 1951, the year of its 200th anniversary. He was awarded the CBE in 1956. He died on 11 November 1969.
