= Azariah Shadrach =

Welsh minister (1774–1844)

Azariah Shadrach (1774–1844) was a Welsh evangelical writer and pastor.

== Life ==
He was born on 24 June 1774 at Garn Deilo fach in the parish of Llanfair-Nant-y-Gôf, Pembrokeshire, the fifth son of Henry and Ann Shadrach of Nevern. As an adult and farm servant to a local Independent minister, John Richards, he had access to his employer's books. At his master's suggestion he decided to enter the Independent ministry, and in 1798 he went on a preaching tour to North Wales.

Shadrach was induced by George Lewis to remain in the area as a schoolmaster, first at Hirnant near Bala, and then at Pennal and Derwenlas near Machynlleth. Towards the end of 1802 he was ordained pastor of the independent church at Llanrwst. There he campaigned against the Gŵyl Mabsantau which flourished in the district. In November 1806 he removed to north Cardiganshire, where he had charge of the churches of Talybont and Llanbadarn Fawr.

In 1819 Shadrach took on a new church which he formed at Aberystwyth, and for which, two years later, he built a chapel, at his own cost. In poor health, he resigned his charges in August 1835, but continued to preach until his death on 18 January 1844. He was buried at St. Michael's Church, Aberystwyth.

== Works ==
Shadrach has been called the "Bunyan of Wales", for his use of allegory, a title also given to Christmas Evans. He was the author of 27 works, all but one in Welsh. They were mostly homiletic in character, sketches of sermons that he had given. A Looking Glass; neu Ddrych y Gwrthgiliwr (Carmarthen, 1807, and reprints), was translated into English by Edward S. Byam, chief magistrate of Mauritius, as The Backslider's Mirror: a popular Welsh treatise, translated from the ancient British Language, London, 1845. His final work, Cerbyd o Goed Libanus (Aberystwyth, 1840), included some autobiographical notes.

In 1836 Shadrach wrote a prophetic ballad about the Aberdyfi district, which gained a reputation.

== Family ==
Azariah Shadrach married Margaret Maurice in 1805. They had at least four children, Eliakim Lloyd, Eve, Joanna and David Shadrach.
