= Nathaniel Williams (writer) =

Welsh writer

Nathaniel Williams (born 1656 or 1657; died c. 1679) was a Welsh writer.

== Life ==
Nathaniel Williams was the son of Thomas Williams, from Swansea in South Wales. He studied at the University of Oxford, matriculating as a member of Jesus College in 1672 and obtaining a Bachelor of Arts degree in 1676. He wrote two books: A Pindaric Elegy on the famous Physician Dr. Willis (published in 1675) and Imago Saeculi or the Image of the Age represented in four Characters, viz. the ambitious Statesman, insatiable Miser, atheistic Gallant, and factious Schismatic (published the following year). He died in about 1679.
