= Alban Thomas =

British librarian

Alban Thomas (1686–1771) was a Welsh medical doctor, librarian and antiquarian, who followed in his father's footsteps in supporting Welsh literature, being particularly associated with efforts by Moses Williams to publish Welsh-language manuscripts.

== Life ==
Thomas was the son of a Welsh cleric, poet and translator, also called Alban Thomas, who was involved in a literary renaissance in the Newcastle Emlyn area at the end of the 17th century / beginning of the 18th century. Thomas (the son) was born in 1686 and matriculated at Jesus College, Oxford. By 1708 he was librarian of the Ashmolean Museum in Oxford, and he was the assistant secretary of the Royal Society in London in 1713. He graduated with a Doctor of Medicine degree from the University of Aberdeen in 1719. His Aberdeen links led to suspicions in Government circles that Thomas was a Jacobite sympathiser, and Thomas had to stay away from London, where he practised, for some time after March 1722. Unable to resume his medical career in London on his return, he moved back to Wales and practised there until his death in 1771. He was associated with the attempts of the antiquarian Moses Williams to collect and publish material contained in manuscripts in the Welsh language, taking subscriptions in 1719 towards publication of Collection of Writings in the Welsh Tongue, to the beginning of the Sixteenth Century, to be printed in several Volumes in Octavo. Thomas himself published a List of Fellows of the Royal Society of London in 1718.
