= John Jones (Jac Glan-y-gors) =

Welsh poet and satirist (1766–1821)

John Jones Jac Glan y Gors
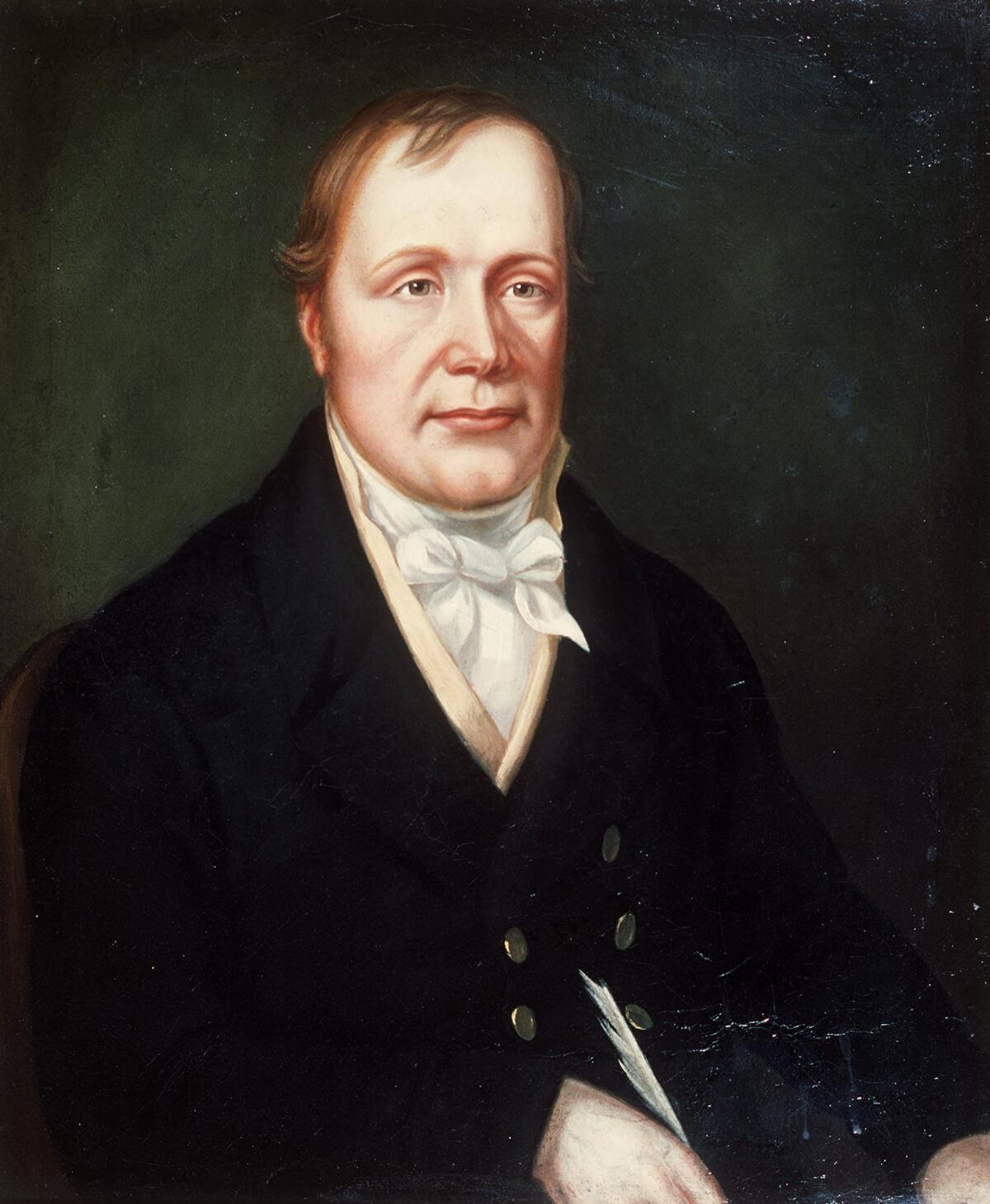
- Born: 10 November 1766; Cerrigydrudion, Wales
- Died: 21 May 1821 (aged 55)
- Occupations: Author, Poet, Political Writer

John Jones (10 November 1766 – 21 May 1821), better known by his bardic name Jac Glan-y-gors, was a Welsh language satirical poet and radical pamphleteer, born in Cerrigydrudion, Denbighshire, north Wales.

Glan-y-gors was an accomplished and natural prose writer although his output was small. His best known prose works are Seren Tan Gwmmwl and Toriad y Dydd, political tracts addressed to the Welsh people which reflect the radical ideals of Thomas Paine and the author's Welsh patriotism. As a satirist, he was highly influential.

His poetic output is more considerable and includes the poem entitled Cerdd Dic Siôn Dafydd (Note: Dic Siôn Dafydd – Richard son of John son of David – is the name given to a Welshman who despises his language and who imitates the English. Dic Siôn Dafydd left Wales and became a draper in London; his pomposity led him to claim that he had forgotten how to speak Welsh, and on a visit to his mother in Wales who spoke only Welsh he insisted on speaking English.) which lampoons those of the upwardly-mobile Welsh in London who turned their backs on their country and language in order to ingratiate themselves to the English. It became one of the most familiar Welsh poems of the 19th century and is still appreciated today. The eponymous 'Dic Siôn Dafydd' has entered common usage as a derogatory term for any Welsh person of a similar nature, rather like "Uncle Tom" in relation to African-Americans.

In 1789 he moved to London and in 1793 became either the licensee or the manager of the 'Canterbury Arms' in Southwark. He was active in the London-based Gwyneddigion Society, and a founder member in 1794 or 1795 of the Cymreigyddion Society.

On 23 July 1816, he married Jane Mondel of Whitehaven in Bermondsey parish church. He died aged 55 on 21 May 1821 and was buried in the little church of St Gregory, which is now part of St Paul's Cathedral.

== Bibliography ==
- Seren tan Gwmwl a Toriad y Dydd, (Liverpool, 1923). In Welsh.
- Richard Griffith (ed.), Gwaith Glan y Gors (Llanuwchllyn, 1905). An edition of Glan-y-gors' poetry.
- E. G. Millward (ed.), Cerddi Jac Glan-y-Gors (Abertawe, 2003). An edition of Glan-y-gors' poetry, published by Barddas.
- Marion Löffler, with Bethan Jenkins, Political Pamphlets and Sermons from Wales 1790-1806 (Cardiff, 2014). Contains a new publication with translation and notes of Seren Tan Gwmmwl and Toriad y Dydd.
