= Nicholas Owen (priest) =

British priest (1752–1811)

Nicholas Owen (2 January 1752 – 30 May 1811) was a Welsh Anglican priest and antiquarian.

== Life ==
Owen, who was born in Llandyfrydog, Anglesey (where his father was the rector of St Tyfrydog's Church, Llandyfrydog), was educated at Jesus College, Oxford, obtaining his Bachelor of Arts degree in 1773 and his Master of Arts degree in 1776. He was ordained as a priest in the Church of England and was a curate (possibly also a schoolmaster) in Winslow, Buckinghamshire by 1779, but resigned in 1789. Cantankerous appeals to various bishops and influential layman to be given a parish in north Wales were initially unsuccessful, with Owen having to make a public apology to the Bishop of Bangor. He was given the parish of Llanfihangel Ysgeifiog and Llanffinan in 1790, and became rector of Mellteyrn with Botwnnog in 1800. He died on 30 May 1811 and was buried at Llandyfrydog.

== Works ==
Owen wrote on various topics from Welsh history. In 1788, his British Remains covered a number of subjects including a discussion of the claim that Prince Madoc discovered America and a biography of Edward Lhuyd. Carnarvonshire: a Sketch of its History was published in 1792, and he may have been the author of the anonymous A History of the Island of Anglesey, with Memoirs of Owen Glendower (1775), although other names have been put forward.
