= Edward Jones (Bardd y Brenin) =

Welsh harpist and collector of music (1752–1824)

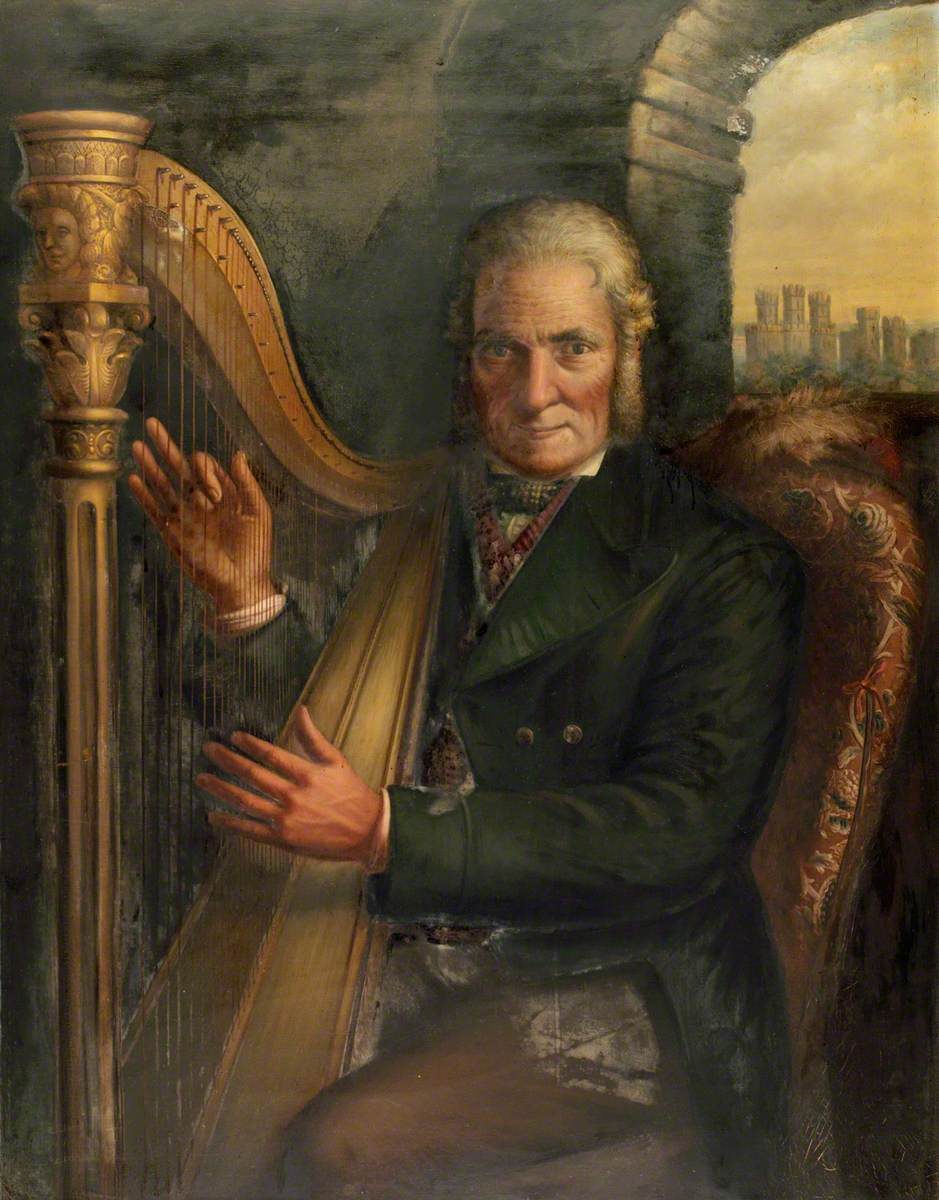
"Bardd y Brenin" about 1900

Edward Jones (March 1752 – 18 April 1824) commonly known by his bardic name Bardd y Brenin, was a Welsh harpist, bard, performer, composer, arranger, and collector of music. Jones was born in Llandderfel, near Bala, and is remembered for his three-volume work, the Musical and Poetical Relicks of the Welsh Bards.

He first came to London in 1775, and was patronised by prominent Welshmen and by Charles Burney. He played in the Bach-Abel concerts (established by Johann Christian Bach and Carl Friedrich Abel) which were London’s first subscription concert series, started in 1765. He became harp tutor to several wealthy families, and in about 1790 was made Harp-Master to the Prince of Wales. In 1805 Jones moved into the Office of the Robes in St James's Palace and took his bardic name "Bardd y Brenin" (The King's Bard) in 1820 when his patron King George IV came to the throne.

Jones suffered significant financial difficulties in his later life and, as well as seeking loans, was forced to sell some of his collection.

The remainder of his library was sold at auction the year following his death.

== Works ==
- The Musical and Poetical Relicks of the Welsh Bards (1784). Welsh Bards preserved by tradition and authentic antique manuscripts improved with variations for the Harp, Pianoforte, Violin, Flute, etc. Frontispieces drawn by Philip James de Loutherbourg.
- A Miscellaneous Collection of French and Italian Ariettas (c. 1795); Adapted with Accompaniments for the Harp or Harpsichord.
- The Bardic Museum (1802); forming the second volume of the Musical and Poetical Relicks of the Welsh Bards and Druids; Preserved by Tradition from very remote antiquity. To the Bardic tunes are added Variations for the Harp, Piano-forte, Violin or Flute ... Likewise a general history of the Bards, and Druids, from the earliest period to the present time.
- Lyric Airs (1804), consisting of Specimens of Greek, Albanian, Walachian, Turkish, Arabian, Persian, Chinese, and Moorish National Songs and Melodies (being the first selection of the kind ever yet offered to the public); to which are added, Basses for the Harp, or Piano-forte. Likewise are subjoined, a few explanatory notes on the figures and movements of the Modern Greek Dances; with a short dissertation on the Origin of the Ancient Greek Music.
- A Selection of most Admired and Original German Waltzes (1806), never before published; adapted for the Harp, or Piano-Forte.
- Maltese Melodies (c. 1810); or National Airs, and Dances, usually performed by the Maltese Musicians at their Carnival, & other Festivals; with a few other characteristic Italian Airs & Songs. To these are annex'd a selection of Norwegian Tunes, never before Published; and to which are added Basses for the Harp or Piano Forte.
- Hen Ganiadau Cymru: Cambro-British melodies, or the national songs, and airs of Wales (1820), consisting of ... songs, euphonies, flowers, elegies, marches, ... harp, or the piano-forte, violin, or flute.

Three of his published works include frontispieces by Thomas Rowlandson.

== Sources ==
- Welsh Biography Online
