= 1702 in Wales =

- Centuries: 16th; 17th; 18th; 19th; 20th
- Decades: 1680s; 1690s; 1700s; 1710s; 1720s
- See also: List of years in Wales; Timeline of Welsh history 1702 in England Scotland Elsewhere

This article is about the particular significance of the year 1702 to Wales and its people.

== Incumbents ==
- Lord Lieutenant of North Wales (Lord Lieutenant of Anglesey, Caernarvonshire, Denbighshire, Flintshire, Merionethshire, Montgomeryshire) – William Stanley, 9th Earl of Derby; (10 June – 5 November 1702)Hugh Cholmondeley, 1st Earl of Cholmondeley (from 2 December)
- Lord Lieutenant of Glamorgan, Brecknockshire, Cardiganshire, Carmarthenshire, Monmouthshire, Pembrokeshire, Radnorshire – Thomas Herbert, 8th Earl of Pembroke
- Bishop of Bangor – John Evans
- Bishop of Llandaff – William Beaw
- Bishop of St Asaph – Edward Jones
- Bishop of St Davids – vacant

== Events ==
- 8 March – Anne, daughter of King James II, comes to the throne of Great Britain. Since her only surviving son had died prior to her accession, there is no prospective Prince of Wales.
- 5 May – Following a suspension of nearly a year, Edward Jones, Bishop of St Asaph, is allowed to return to his see.
- date unknown
  - The 23rd Regiment of Foot is granted the title The Welsh Regiment of Fuzileers.
  - An eisteddfod is held at Machynlleth.
  - Richard Bulkeley, 4th Viscount Bulkeley, succeeds his father, the 3rd Viscount, as Constable of Beaumaris Castle.

== Arts and literature ==
=== New books ===
- David Maurice – Cynffwrdd i'r gwan Gristion, neu'r gorsen ysig (translation from work of Theophilus Dorrington)

== Births ==
- 20 May – Thomas Morgan, judge (died 1769)
- date unknown
  - Richard Farrington, antiquary (died 1772)
  - Humphrey Owen, academic (died 1768)

== Deaths ==
- January – James Annesley, 3rd Earl of Anglesey, 31
- 25 March – Lewis Wogan of Boulston, High Sheriff of Pembrokeshire, about 50
- 12 May – Elizabeth Gwyn, philanthropist, daughter of Thomas Gwyn of Hay Castle
- 5 November – William Stanley, 9th Earl of Derby, Lord Lieutenant of North Wales, about 47
- December – Sir Charles Kemeys, 3rd Baronet, Governor of Cardiff Castle
- date unknown – David Maurice, clergyman and translator, 76

== See also ==
- 1702 in Scotland
