= 1705 in Wales =

- Centuries: 16th; 17th; 18th; 19th; 20th
- Decades: 1680s; 1690s; 1700s; 1710s; 1720s
- See also: List of years in Wales; Timeline of Welsh history 1705 in England Scotland Elsewhere

This article is about the particular significance of the year 1705 to Wales and its people.

== Incumbents ==
- Lord Lieutenant of North Wales (Lord Lieutenant of Anglesey, Caernarvonshire, Denbighshire, Flintshire, Merionethshire, Montgomeryshire) – Hugh Cholmondeley, 1st Earl of Cholmondeley
- Lord Lieutenant of South Wales (Lord Lieutenant of Glamorgan, Brecknockshire, Cardiganshire, Carmarthenshire, Monmouthshire, Pembrokeshire, Radnorshire) – Thomas Herbert, 8th Earl of Pembroke
- Bishop of Bangor – John Evans
- Bishop of Llandaff – William Beaw
- Bishop of St Asaph – William Beveridge
- Bishop of St Davids – George Bull (consecrated 29 April)

== Events ==
- 29 April - George Bull is consecrated Bishop of St David's.
- May–June - In the 1705 English general election, Richard Bulkeley, 4th Viscount Bulkeley, becomes MP for Anglesey, and Sir Thomas Powell, 1st Baronet, is MP for Monmouth Boroughs.
- date unknown - Edward Brereton is replaced as MP for Denbigh after having offended the local gentry.

== Arts and literature ==
=== New books ===
- Myles Davies - The Recantation of Mr. Pollett, a Roman priest
- Thomas Edwardes - Diocesan Episcopacy proved from Holy Scripture
- Letters of Orinda to Poliarchus (the letters of Katherine Philips (posthumously published)
- Walter Morgan - The Parson's Jewel

== Births ==
- 6 May - William Morris, botanist, one of the Morris brothers of Anglesey (d. 1763)
- date unknown
  - David Evans, Canon of St Asaph (d. 1788)
  - Dafydd Nicolas, poet (d. 1774)

== Deaths ==
- August - William Richards, author of Wallography, or the Britton described
- date unknown - Lionel Wafer, explorer, 65

== See also ==
- 1705 in Scotland
