= 1703 in Wales =

- Centuries: 16th; 17th; 18th; 19th; 20th
- Decades: 1680s; 1690s; 1700s; 1710s; 1720s
- See also: List of years in Wales; Timeline of Welsh history 1703 in England Scotland Elsewhere

This article is about the particular significance of the year 1703 to Wales and its people.

== Incumbents ==
- Lord Lieutenant of North Wales (Lord Lieutenant of Anglesey, Caernarvonshire, Denbighshire, Flintshire, Merionethshire, Montgomeryshire) – Hugh Cholmondeley, 1st Earl of Cholmondeley (10 June – 5 November 1702)
- Lord Lieutenant of South Wales (Lord Lieutenant of Glamorgan, Brecknockshire, Cardiganshire, Carmarthenshire, Monmouthshire, Pembrokeshire, Radnorshire) – Thomas Herbert, 8th Earl of Pembroke
- Bishop of Bangor – John Evans
- Bishop of Llandaff – William Beaw
- Bishop of St Asaph – Edward Jones (until 10 May); George Hooper (from 13 October)
- Bishop of St Davids – vacant

== Events ==
- 30 March – Catherine Price, sister of Richard Price, marries William Thomas of Cefn Ydfa, Llangynwyd; they would become the parents of Ann Maddocks.
- July – John Hanbury II marries Bridget Ayscough, the eldest daughter of Sir Edward Ayscough of Stallingbough, Lincolnshire. Sir Edward's only son having died, Bridget inherits a share of his estates and brings a fortune of £10,000 to the marriage.
- 20 July – Sir Roger Mostyn, 3rd Baronet, marries Lady Essex Finch, daughter of the Earl of Nottingham.
- 28 August – Thomas Windsor, 1st Viscount Windsor, marries Charlotte Herbert, daughter of Philip Herbert, 7th Earl of Pembroke, and widow of John Jeffreys, 2nd Baron Jeffreys
- date unknown
  - Baptist leader Thomas Griffiths and a small group of followers settle at Welsh Tract, Delaware, where they found the Welsh Tract Baptist church.

== Arts and literature ==
=== New books ===
- James Owen – Moderation a Virtue
- Ellis Wynne – Gweledigaetheu y Bardd Cwsc
- Pasc y Christion (translation of a work by Thomas Doolittle)

=== Music ===
- Thomas Baddy – hymns appended to Pasc y Christion

== Births ==
- 2 February – Richard Morris, one of the celebrated Morris brothers of Anglesey (d. 1779)
- probable – Henry Herbert, 1st Earl of Powis (d. 1772)

== Deaths ==
- 10 May – Edward Jones, Bishop of St Asaph, 62
- 16 July – Robert Brudenell, 2nd Earl of Cardigan, 96

== See also ==
- 1703 in Scotland
