= 1700 in Wales =

- Centuries: 15th; 16th; 17th; 18th; 19th
- Decades: 1680s; 1690s; 1700s; 1710s; 1720s
- See also: List of years in Wales; Timeline of Welsh history 1700 in England Scotland Elsewhere

This article is about the particular significance of the year 1700 to Wales and its people.

== Incumbents ==
- Lord Lieutenant of North Wales (Lord Lieutenant of Anglesey, Caernarvonshire, Denbighshire, Flintshire, Merionethshire, Montgomeryshire) – Charles Gerard, 2nd Earl of Macclesfield
- Lord Lieutenant of South Wales (Lord Lieutenant of Glamorgan, Brecknockshire, Cardiganshire, Carmarthenshire, Monmouthshire, Pembrokeshire, Radnorshire) – Thomas Herbert, 8th Earl of Pembroke
- Bishop of Bangor – Humphrey Humphreys
- Bishop of Llandaff – William Beaw
- Bishop of St Asaph – Edward Jones
- Bishop of St Davids – vacant

== Events ==
- date unknown
  - Quaker emigrant Rowland Ellis is elected to represent Philadelphia in the provincial assembly.
  - Evan Evans travels from Wales to become rector of Christ Church, Philadelphia
  - The Gower family immigrates from Worcestershire into Wales.

== Arts and literature ==
=== New books ===
- John Jones – The Mysteries of Opium Revealed
- David Maurice
  - Arweiniwr cartrefol i'r iawn a'r buddiol dderbyniad o Swperyr Arglwydd
  - The Promised Reed; a sermon preach'd ... for the support of weak Christians

== Births ==
- 8 March – William Morgan the elder, of Tredegar, politician (died 1731)
- May – Sir George Wynne, 1st Baronet, of Leeswood Hall, Flintshire, landowner and politician (died 1756)
- date unknown
  - John Jones, clergyman and controversialist (died 1770)
  - Benjamin Meredith, Baptist minister (died 1749)
  - Guto Nyth Brân (Griffith Morgan), legendary athlete (died 1737)
- probable
  - John Edwards (Siôn y Potiau), poet (died 1776)
  - Lewis Evans, surveyor (died 1756)

== Deaths ==
- 21 January – Henry Somerset, 1st Duke of Beaufort, politician, 70/71
- 15 March – Hugh Owen, independent minister
- 11 July – Sir William Williams, 1st Baronet, of Gray's Inn, 65/66
- 19 July – John Evans, Puritan clergyman and teacher, 51/52
- 15 September – Sir John Aubrey, 2nd Baronet, about 50 (injuries from a fall)
- 16 December – Thomas Morgan (of Dderw), politician, 36 (smallpox)
- probable – Owen Wynne, lawyer and civil servant, about 48

== See also ==
- 1700 in Scotland
