= 1706 in Wales =

- Centuries: 16th; 17th; 18th; 19th; 20th
- Decades: 1680s; 1690s; 1700s; 1710s; 1720s
- See also: List of years in Wales; Timeline of Welsh history 1706 in England Scotland Elsewhere

This article is about the particular significance of the year 1706 to Wales and its people.

== Incumbents ==
- Lord Lieutenant of North Wales (Lord Lieutenant of Anglesey, Caernarvonshire, Denbighshire, Flintshire, Merionethshire, Montgomeryshire) – Hugh Cholmondeley, 1st Earl of Cholmondeley
- Lord Lieutenant of South Wales (Lord Lieutenant of Glamorgan, Brecknockshire, Cardiganshire, Carmarthenshire, Monmouthshire, Pembrokeshire, Radnorshire) – Thomas Herbert, 8th Earl of Pembroke
- Bishop of Bangor – John Evans
- Bishop of Llandaff – William Beaw (until 10 February); John Tyler (from 30 June)
- Bishop of St Asaph – William Beveridge
- Bishop of St Davids – George Bull

== Events ==
- 18 January - Erasmus Saunders is made Rector of Helmdon, Northamptonshire.
- 17 November - Thomas Mansel, future Baron Mansel, becomes 5th Baronet Mansel of Margam on the death of his father Edward Mansel.
- date unknown
  - Crickhowell Bridge rebuilt in stone.
  - At Esgair Hir mines, Cardiganshire, "The Governour and Company of the Mine-Adventurers of England [the company owned by Humphrey Mackworth] allow £20 per annum for a Charity-School for the Children of the miners and workmen belonging to the said Company. The said Company also give £30 yearly to a Minister to read prayers, preach, and catechise the children."
  - Ellis Pugh, Quaker colonist of Pennsylvania, returns to Wales for a two-year stay.

== Arts and literature ==
=== New books ===
- William Jones - Synopsis Palmariorum Matheseos

== Births ==
- date unknown
  - Frederick Cornewall, MP for Montgomery Boroughs 1771-1774 (died 1788)
  - William Hopkins, clergyman and author (died 1786)
  - Anna Williams, poet (died 1783)

== Deaths ==
- 10 February - William Beaw, Bishop of Llandaff, 90
- 7 October - Richard Lewis of Van
- 7 November - Daniel Price, Dean of St Asaph (date of birth unknown)
- 17 November - Sir Edward Mansel, 4th Baronet, 69/70

== See also ==
- 1706 in Scotland
