= 1704 in Wales =

- Centuries: 16th; 17th; 18th; 19th; 20th
- Decades: 1680s; 1690s; 1700s; 1710s; 1720s
- See also: List of years in Wales; Timeline of Welsh history 1704 in England Scotland Elsewhere

This article is about the particular significance of the year 1704 to Wales and its people.

== Incumbents ==
- Lord Lieutenant of North Wales (Lord Lieutenant of Anglesey, Caernarvonshire, Denbighshire, Flintshire, Merionethshire, Montgomeryshire) – Hugh Cholmondeley, 1st Earl of Cholmondeley
- Lord Lieutenant of South Wales (Lord Lieutenant of Glamorgan, Brecknockshire, Cardiganshire, Carmarthenshire, Monmouthshire, Pembrokeshire, Radnorshire) – Thomas Herbert, 8th Earl of Pembroke
- Bishop of Bangor – John Evans
- Bishop of Llandaff – William Beaw
- Bishop of St Asaph – George Hooper (until 14 March); William Beveridge (from 16 July)
- Bishop of St Davids – vacant

== Events ==
- 6 April - Sir Humphrey Mackworth proposes to the SPCK the "Erection of libraries in Wales".
- May - Erasmus Lewis becomes secretary to Robert Harley at the Northern Department.
- July - Richard Vaughan of Corsygedol becomes Constable of Harlech Castle.
- 9 October - Roger Griffith is installed as archdeacon of Brecon.
- date unknown
  - Jane Kemeys of Cefn Mabli marries Sir John Tynte, 2nd Baronet, resulting in an alliance between two important families and the beginning of the Kemeys-Tynte dynasty.

== Arts and literature ==
=== New books ===
- John Morgan - Bloeddnad Ofnadwy yr Utcorn Diweddaf (posthumously published)
- Robert Nelson - A Companion for the Festivals and Fasts of the Church of England

== Births ==
- May - Ann Maddocks, the "maid of Cefn Ydfa" (died 1727)
- December - Richard Herbert, politician (died 1754)
- date unknown - Robert Jones, politician (died 1774)

== Deaths ==
- May - William Wynne, historian, about 33
- 9 August - Richard Bulkeley, 3rd Viscount Bulkeley, about 46, politician
- November - Sir John Williams, 2nd Baronet, of Llangibby, about 53

== See also ==
- 1704 in Scotland
