= 1704 in Scotland =

- Centuries: 16th; 17th; 18th; 19th; 20th
- Decades: 1680s; 1690s; 1700s; 1710s; 1720s
- See also: List of years in Scotland; Timeline of Scottish history 1704 in: England • Wales • Elsewhere

Events from the year 1704 in the Kingdom of Scotland.

== Incumbents ==
- Monarch – Anne
- Secretary of State –
  - until October: James Douglas, 2nd Duke of Queensberry, jointly with George Mackenzie, 1st Viscount Tarbat
  - from October: John Ker, 5th Earl of Roxburghe jointly with James Ogilvy, 1st Earl of Seafield

=== Law officers ===
- Lord Advocate – Sir James Stewart
- Solicitor General for Scotland – William Carmichael

=== Judiciary ===
- Lord President of the Court of Session – Lord North Berwick
- Lord Justice General – Lord Tarbat
- Lord Justice Clerk – Lord Prestonhall, then Lord Whitelaw

== Events ==
- 5 August – the Parliament of Scotland passes the Act of Security 1704 in response to the Parliament of England's Act of Settlement 1701, allowing the Scottish Parliament to select its own successor to the monarch.
- 10 September – Lower Largo-born sailor Alexander Selkirk chooses to be marooned from a privateer ship in the Juan Fernández Islands.
- 20 September – Dunkeld is erected a royal burgh.

== Births ==
- 30 April – Jean Adam, poet (died 1765)
- 7 September – John Hope, 2nd Earl of Hopetoun (died 1781)

Date unknown

- William Hamilton, Jacobite poet (died 1754)
- William Boyd, 4th Earl of Kilmarnock (died 1746)
- Thomas Lyon, 8th Earl of Strathmore and Kinghorne (died 1753)

== Deaths ==
- 4 January – Sir Alexander Munro of Bearcrofts (year of birth unknown)
- 6 March – George Seton, 4th Earl of Winton (born c. 1641)
- 13 June – Arthur Rose, prelate (born 1634)

Date unknown

- Lilias Adie, accused witch (year of birth unknown)

== See also ==
- Timeline of Scottish history
