= 1707 in Wales =

- Centuries: 16th; 17th; 18th; 19th; 20th
- Decades: 1680s; 1690s; 1700s; 1710s; 1720s
- See also: List of years in Wales; Timeline of Welsh history 1707 in Great Britain England Scotland Elsewhere

This article is about the particular significance of the year 1707 to Wales and its people.

== Incumbents ==
- Lord Lieutenant of North Wales (Lord Lieutenant of Anglesey, Caernarvonshire, Denbighshire, Flintshire, Merionethshire, Montgomeryshire) – Hugh Cholmondeley, 1st Earl of Cholmondeley
- Lord Lieutenant of South Wales (Lord Lieutenant of Glamorgan, Brecknockshire, Cardiganshire, Carmarthenshire, Monmouthshire, Pembrokeshire, Radnorshire) – Thomas Herbert, 8th Earl of Pembroke
- Bishop of Bangor – John Evans
- Bishop of Llandaff – John Tyler
- Bishop of St Asaph – William Beveridge
- Bishop of St Davids – George Bull

== Events ==
- 1 May – The Acts of Union come into force, making Wales officially a part of the Kingdom of Great Britain. The newly established Parliament of Great Britain has a total of 27 MPs representing Welsh constituencies, as opposed to 45 for Scotland and 486 for England.
- December – Richard Bulkeley, 4th Viscount Bulkeley, is accused of having appropriated building materials from Beaumaris Castle for use on his own estates.

== Arts and literature ==
=== New books ===
- Egwyddorion y Grefydd Gristianogawl
- Godidawgrwydd Rhinwedd
- Edward Lhuyd – Archaeologia Britannica: an Account of the Languages, Histories and Customs of Great Britain, from Travels through Wales, Cornwall, Bas-Bretagne, Ireland and Scotland. Vol. 1: Glossography Lhuyd's work was compiled with assistance from Moses Williams, and was dedicated to Thomas Mansel, 1st Baron Mansel.

== Births ==
- 1 February – Frederick, Prince of Wales, son of the future George II of Great Britain (died 1751)
- April? – Griffith Hughes, naturalist and author (died c.1758)
- 1 September – John Salusbury, explorer and diarist (died 1762)
- 30 September – Richard Trevor, Bishop of St David's (died 1771)
- probable
  - Thomas Allgood II, heir to the Pontypool japanning works, who would make further improvements to the process
  - William Vaughan of Corsygedol, politician (died 1775)

== Deaths ==
- 14 December – Humphrey Edwin, London merchant and owner of the Llanmihangel estate, 65
- date unknown – Love Parry, ancestor of the Jones-Parry Baronets, 53

== See also ==
- 1707 in Scotland
