= 1707 in England =

- Centuries: 16th; 17th; 18th; 19th; 20th
- Decades: 1680s; 1690s; 1700s; 1710s; 1720s
- See also: 1707 in Great Britain; Other events of 1707

Events from the year 1707 in the Kingdom of England, then England.

== Incumbents ==
- Monarch – Anne (until 1 May; England and Scotland unite)

== Events ==
- 16 January – The Parliament of Scotland passes the Union with England Act.
- 19 March – The Act of Union with Scotland is passed by the Parliament of England.
- 14 April (25 April New Style) – At the Battle of Almansa (Spain) in the War of the Spanish Succession, the Bourbon army of Spain and France (with Irish mercenaries) under the French-born Englishman James FitzJames, 1st Duke of Berwick, soundly defeats the allied forces of Portugal, England, and the Dutch Republic led by the French-born Huguenot in English service Henri de Massue, Earl of Galway.
- 1 May – England becomes part of the united kingdom of Great Britain as a result of the 1706 Treaty of Union that was ratified by the Acts of Union and merges the Parliaments of England and Scotland to form the Parliament of Great Britain. The Equivalent, a sum of £398,000, is paid to Scotland by the English government to compensate for the fact that Scotland had no National Debt but, on Union, was taking on shared responsibility for England’s National Debt.

== Births ==
- 13 January – John Boyle, 5th Earl of Cork, writer (died 1762)
- 28 January (bapt.) – John Baskerville, printer (died 1775)
- 1 February (NS) – Frederick, Prince of Wales, heir apparent to the British throne from 1727 (born in Hanover; died 1751)
- 23 March – Henry Scudamore, 3rd Duke of Beaufort (died 1745)
- 22 April – Henry Fielding, novelist and dramatist (died 1754)

== Deaths ==
- 20 January – Humphrey Hody, theologian (born 1659)
- 30 March – Henry Hall, poet and composer of church music (born c. 1656)
- 29 April – George Farquhar, dramatist (born 1677 in Ireland)

== See also ==
- 1707 in Scotland
- 1707 in Wales
