= 1701 in Wales =

- Centuries: 16th; 17th; 18th; 19th; 20th
- Decades: 1680s; 1690s; 1700s; 1710s; 1720s
- See also: List of years in Wales; Timeline of Welsh history 1701 in England Scotland Elsewhere

This article is about the particular significance of the year 1701 to Wales and its people.

== Incumbents ==
- Lord Lieutenant of North Wales (Lord Lieutenant of Anglesey, Caernarvonshire, Denbighshire, Flintshire, Merionethshire, Montgomeryshire) – Charles Gerard, 2nd Earl of Macclesfield (until 5 November 1701; afterwards vacant until 1702)
- Lord Lieutenant of North Wales (Lord Lieutenant of Glamorgan, Brecknockshire, Cardiganshire, Carmarthenshire, Monmouthshire, Pembrokeshire, Radnorshire) – Thomas Herbert, 8th Earl of Pembroke
- Bishop of Bangor – Humphrey Humphreys
- Bishop of Llandaff – William Beaw
- Bishop of St Asaph – Edward Jones
- Bishop of St Davids – vacant

== Events ==
- February - Humphrey Mackworth becomes MP for Cardiganshire.
- June - Edward Jones, Bishop of St Asaph, is suspended by Thomas Tenison, Archbishop of Canterbury, for simony and maladministration.
- 8 September - A group of Welsh Baptists, led by Thomas Griffith, land in Philadelphia on the ship "James and Mary".
- 16 September - On the death of the deposed King James II of England/VII of Scotland, his son James Francis Edward Stuart, the former Prince of Wales, is recognised by King Louis XIV of France as the rightful ruler of England, Scotland and Ireland
- 2 December - Humphrey Humphreys is consecrated Bishop of Hereford; he is replaced as Bishop of Bangor in the following year by John Evans.
- December - John Hanbury marries Albina, the daughter of John Selwyn of Gloucestershire, and is elected unopposed as MP for Gloucester.
- date unknown - Evan Evans begins holding Anglican services at a private house in Radnor Township, Delaware County, Pennsylvania.

== Arts and literature ==
=== New books ===
- James Owen - Translation into Welsh of the Shorter Westminster Catechism

== Births ==
- 2 March - Lewis Morris, hydrographer, antiquary, poet and lexicographer, eldest of the four famous Morris brothers of Anglesey (died 1765)
- September - Sir John Wynn, 2nd Baronet (died 1773)

== Deaths ==
- August
  - Sir John Hanmer, 3rd Baronet (in a duel)
  - Thomas Hanmer (cousin of the above), politician, about 53
- 14 September - John Morgan, vicar of Aberconwy, writer, 38/39
- 5 November - Charles Gerard, 2nd Earl of Macclesfield, Lord Lieutenant of North Wales, about 41
- date unknown - Hugh Nanney, MP for Merioneth, about 32

== See also ==
- 1701 in Scotland
