= 1707 in Scotland =

- Centuries: 16th; 17th; 18th; 19th; 20th
- Decades: 1680s; 1690s; 1700s; 1710s; 1720s
- See also: List of years in Scotland; Timeline of Scottish history 1707 in: Great Britain • England • Wales • Elsewhere

Events from the year 1707 in the Kingdom of Scotland, then Scotland.

== Incumbents ==
- Monarch – Anne (until 1 May; Scotland and England unite)
- Secretary of State: Hugh Campbell, 3rd Earl of Loudoun, jointly with The Earl of Mar (post abolished at Act of Union)
- Secretary of State for Scotland, from 1 May, when the post was created: The Earl of Mar

=== Law officers ===
- Lord Advocate – Sir James Stewart
- Solicitor General for Scotland – William Carmichael

=== Judiciary ===
- Lord President of the Court of Session – Lord North Berwick
- Lord Justice General – Lord Tarbat
- Lord Justice Clerk – Lord Ormiston

== Events ==
- 16 January – Parliament of Scotland passes the Union with England Act.
- 19 March – official copy of the Act of Union signed by the Scottish Chancellor and the Act is ratified by the Parliament of England.
- 25 March–28 April – last sitting of Parliament of Scotland in Edinburgh until it is revived in 1999 as the Scottish Parliament.
- 25 April – a large school of whales appears in the Firth of Forth; 35 strand on the sands of Kirkcaldy.
- 1 May – the new sovereign state of Great Britain comes into being as a result of the Acts of Union which combine the Kingdoms of England and Scotland into a single united Kingdom of Great Britain and merge the Parliaments of England and Scotland to form the Parliament of Great Britain. The Equivalent, a sum of £398,000, is paid to Scotland by the English government. The Honours of Scotland are locked away in Edinburgh Castle.
- Ormacleit Castle on South Uist is first occupied by Allan Macdonald, chief of Clanranald, and his family.

== Births ==
- 10 April – John Pringle, physician (died 1782 in London)
- 20 April – Robert Foulis, printer and publisher (died 1776)
- 22 June (bapt.) – Elizabeth Blackwell, botanic writer and illustrator (died 1758 in London)
- 5 September – John Forbes, British Army general (died 1759 in Philadelphia)

Date unknown

- Archibald Cameron of Lochiel, physician and last Jacobite to be executed for high treason (hanged 1753 in London)

== Deaths ==
- 8 January – John Dalrymple, 1st Earl of Stair, politician (born 1648)
- 10 March – James Carnegie, Member of the Parliament of Scotland
- 17 March – William Hay, bishop (born 1647)
- 2 June – Mary Erskine, businesswoman and philanthropist

== See also ==
- Timeline of Scottish history
