= 1708 in Wales =

- Centuries: 16th; 17th; 18th; 19th; 20th
- Decades: 1680s; 1690s; 1700s; 1710s; 1720s
- See also: List of years in Wales; Timeline of Welsh history 1708 in Great Britain England Scotland Elsewhere

This article is about the particular significance of the year 1708 to Wales and its people.

== Incumbents ==
- Lord Lieutenant of North Wales (Lord Lieutenant of Anglesey, Caernarvonshire, Denbighshire, Flintshire, Merionethshire, Montgomeryshire) – Hugh Cholmondeley, 1st Earl of Cholmondeley
- Lord Lieutenant of South Wales (Lord Lieutenant of Glamorgan, Brecknockshire, Cardiganshire, Carmarthenshire, Monmouthshire, Pembrokeshire, Radnorshire) – Thomas Herbert, 8th Earl of Pembroke
- Bishop of Bangor – John Evans
- Bishop of Llandaff – John Tyler
- Bishop of St Asaph – William Beveridge (until 5 March); William Fleetwood (from 6 June)
- Bishop of St Davids – George Bull

== Events ==
- July - Following the British general election, some changes in representation occur in Wales:
  - Whig Sir Arthur Owen, 3rd Baronet, replaces Tory John Meyrick as MP for Pembroke
  - Whig Thomas Windsor replaces Sir Hopton Williams, 3rd Baronet, of the same party, as MP for Monmouthshire
  - Sir John Aubrey, 3rd Baronet, is re-elected as MP for Cardiff, after his opponent, Sir Edward Stradling, 5th Baronet, falls out with his supporters.
  - John Roberts replaces Sir William Williams, 2nd Baronet, as MP for Denbigh Boroughs
- October – Edmund Meyrick sets up a school at Carmarthen.
- Edward Lhuyd is elected a fellow of the Royal Society.
- Charles Talbot, 1st Baron Talbot of Hensol, marries Cecil Mathew of Castell y Mynach in Pentyrch.

== Arts and literature ==
=== New books ===
- Cennad oddiwrth y Ser... (almanac)
- Jenkin Evans - Catecism Byr i Blant (translation of Mathew Henry's Short Catechism for Children)

== Births ==
- 8 December - Charles Hanbury Williams, diplomat and satirist (died 1759)
- date unknown - John Pettingall, antiquary (died 1781)
- probable
  - Joshua Andrews, Baptist minister (died 1793)
  - Lewis Hopkin, poet and artisan (died 1771)

== Deaths ==
- 5 March – William Beveridge, Bishop of St Asaph, 71
- 23 March - Thomas Bulkeley, politician, 75
- 1 December - William Wogan, judge and politician, about 70

== See also ==
- 1708 in Scotland
