= 1766 in Great Britain =

Events from the year 1766 in Great Britain.

== Incumbents ==
- Monarch – George III
- Prime Minister – Charles Watson-Wentworth, 2nd Marquess of Rockingham (Whig) (until 30 July); William Pitt, 1st Earl of Chatham (Whig) (starting 30 July)

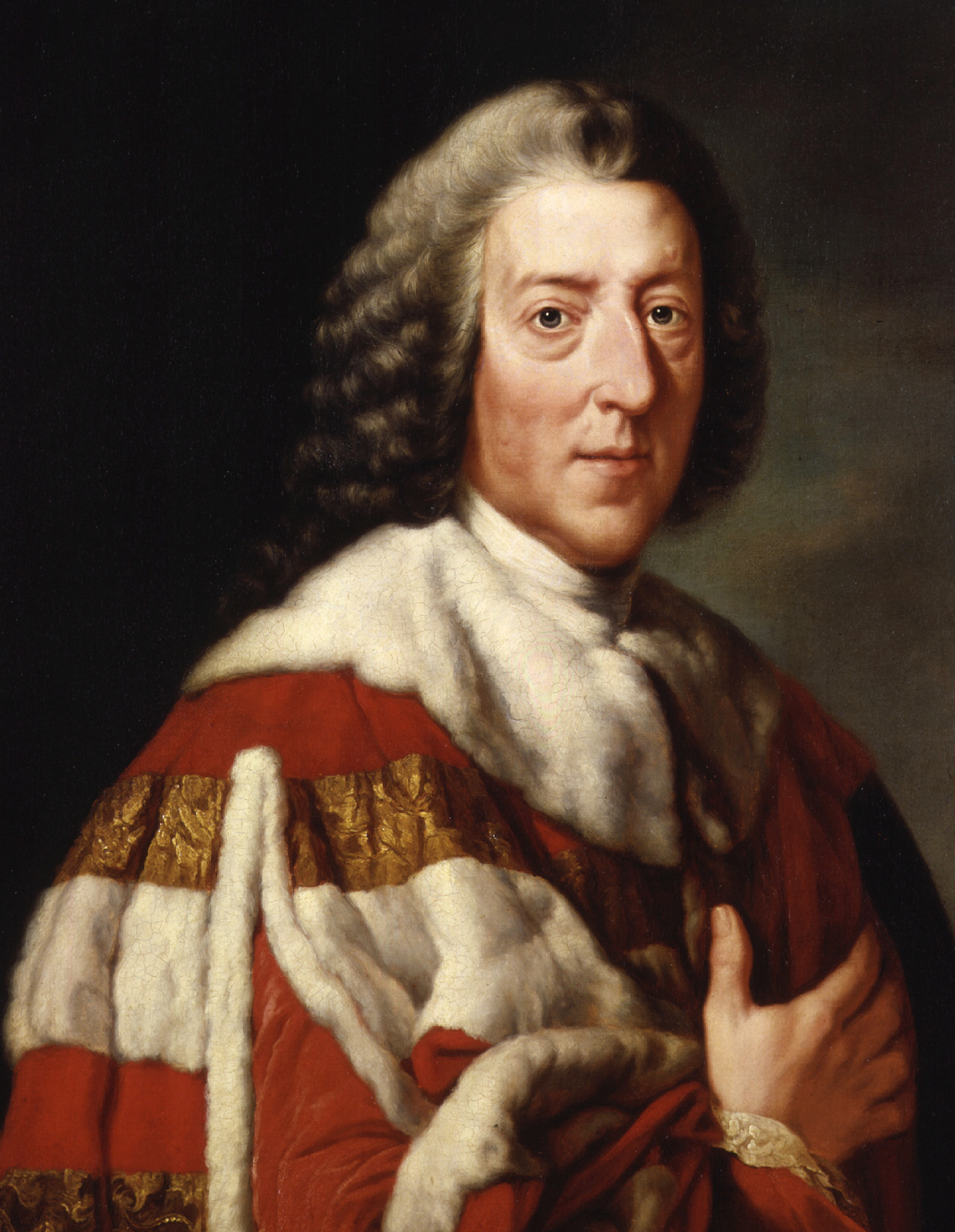
William Pitt, 1st Earl of Chatham

== Events ==
- 1 January – Charles Edward Stuart ("Bonnie Prince Charlie") becomes the new Stuart claimant to the throne of Great Britain as King Charles III and figurehead for Jacobitism, on the death of his father James Francis Edward Stuart, Pretender since 1701. However, the papacy does not recognise his claim, leading to an improvement in British relations with the Holy See.
- 5 February – an observer in Wilmington, North Carolina, reports to the Edinburgh newspaper Caledonian Mercury that three ships have been seized by British Men of War on the charge of carrying official documents without stamps. The strict enforcement causes seven other ships to leave Wilmington for other ports.
- 20 February – the Pennsylvania Gazette reports that a British sloop outside of Wilmington, North Carolina seized one sloop sailing from Philadelphia and one sloop sailing from Saint Christopher on the charge of carrying official documents without stamps. In response, local residents threaten to burn a Royal Man of War attempting to deliver stamps to Wilmington, forcing the ship to return to the mouth of the Cape Fear River.
- February – American Revolution: Parliament repeals the Stamp Act which is very unpopular in the British colonies. The persuasion of Benjamin Franklin is considered partly responsible.
- 18 March – the Declaratory Act asserts the right of Britain to make laws binding in the colonies.
- 29 May – Henry Cavendish presents his paper "On Factitious Airs". This is generally credited to show the discovery of hydrogen, since it describes the density of 'inflammable air', which forms water on combustion.
- 30 May – opening of Theatre Royal, Bristol. Also this year, the surviving Georgian Theatre (Stockton-on-Tees) opens as a playhouse.
- 26 July – construction of the Trent and Mersey Canal begins to connect the River Trent and River Mersey.
- 30 July – Marquess of Rockingham dismissed as Prime Minister by King George III and is succeeded by William Pitt the Elder.
- September – "Bread and butter riots": civil unrest across England following a poor harvest.
- 6 September – Prince William, Duke of Gloucester, marries the illegitimately-born Maria Walpole, Dowager Countess of Waldegrave at her home in Pall Mall, London, an event kept secret from his brother the King until after passage of the Royal Marriages Act 1772.
- October – Addenbrooke's Hospital, Cambridge, completed.
- 27 November – an observer in New York City reports to the Pennsylvania Gazette that a British sloop of war is searching all vessels passing near Cape Lookout, North Carolina, and that some vessels have been seized.
- 5 December – James Christie holds the first sale at Christie's auction house in London.

=== Undated ===
- Lord Mansfield decides the landmark case of Carter v Boehm in English contract law, establishing the duty of utmost good faith (uberrima fides) in insurance contracts.
- The first golf club in England opens, at Blackheath in Kent.

== Publications ==
- James Fordyce's collected Sermons to Young Women.
- Oliver Goldsmith's novel The Vicar of Wakefield.
- John Gwynn's proposals London and Westminster Improved.
- George Stubbs' study The Anatomy of the Horse.

== Births ==
- 15 January – Nathan Drake, essayist and physician (died 1836)
- 12 February – William Howley, archbishop of Canterbury (died 1848)
- 14 February – Thomas Malthus, demographer and economist (died 1834)
- 11 May – Isaac D'Israeli, author (died 1848)
- 3 August – Jeffry Wyattville, architect and garden designer (died 1840)
- 6 August – William Hyde Wollaston, chemist (died 1828)
- 6 September – John Dalton, chemist and physicist (died 1844)
- 21 October – Peter Durand, merchant (died 1822)
- 29 December – Charles Macintosh, Scottish chemist (died 1843)

== Deaths ==
- 1 January – James Francis Edward Stuart, "The Old Pretender" (born 1688)
- 9 January – Thomas Birch, English historian (born 1705)
- 21 January – James Quin, English actor (born 1693)
- 4 April – John Taylor, English classical scholar (born 1704)
- 8 May – Samuel Chandler, English non-conformist minister (born 1693)
- 13 August – Margaret Fownes-Luttrell, English heiress and painter (born 1726)
- 3 September – Archibald Bower, Scottish historian (born 1686)
- 13 September – Benjamin Heath, English classical scholar (born 1704)
- 23 September – John Brown, English essayist (born 1715)
- 29 November – John Wyatt, English inventor (born 1700)

== See also ==
- 1766 in Wales
