= 1711 in Wales =

- Centuries: 16th; 17th; 18th; 19th; 20th
- Decades: 1690s; 1700s; 1710s; 1720s; 1730s
- See also: List of years in Wales; Timeline of Welsh history 1711 in Great Britain Scotland Elsewhere

This article is about the particular significance of the year 1711 to Wales and its people.

== Incumbents ==
- Lord Lieutenant of North Wales (Lord Lieutenant of Anglesey, Caernarvonshire, Denbighshire, Flintshire, Merionethshire, Montgomeryshire) – Hugh Cholmondeley, 1st Earl of Cholmondeley
- Lord Lieutenant of South Wales (Lord Lieutenant of Glamorgan, Brecknockshire, Cardiganshire, Carmarthenshire, Monmouthshire, Pembrokeshire, Radnorshire) – Thomas Herbert, 8th Earl of Pembroke
- Bishop of Bangor – John Evans
- Bishop of Llandaff – John Tyler
- Bishop of St Asaph – William Fleetwood
- Bishop of St Davids – Philip Bisse

== Events ==
- 23 August - Baptist minister Rev Abel Morgan is seen off by his congregation at Rhydwilim prior to embarking for a future in America.
- 23 September - Christmas Samuel is ordained at the request of his congregation at Panteg.
- unknown date
  - Thomas Durston begins printing Welsh language books at Shrewsbury.
  - Newtown Square Friends Meeting House is founded by Welsh immigrants in the Great Valley of Pennsylvania.
  - Price Devereux, 9th Viscount Hereford, becomes Custos Rotulorum of Montgomeryshire.

== Arts and literature ==
=== New books ===
- Jonathan Edwards - A Vindication of the Doctrine of Original Sin from the exceptions of Dr. Daniel Whitby
- William Jones - Analysis per quantitatum series, fluxiones ac differentias
- Y Llyfr Gweddi Gyffredin y Cydymaith Goreu: Yn y Tŷ a'r Stafell

== Births ==
- approximate date
  - Dafydd Jones, hymn-writer (died 1777)
  - Josiah Owen, Presbyterian minister and controversialist (died 1755)
  - Daniel Rowland, Methodist leader (died 1790)

== Deaths ==
- December - unnamed wife and son of Rev Abel Morgan (see Events), both of whom died on board ship during the voyage from Wales to Pennsylvania.

== See also ==
- 1711 in Scotland
