= 1710 in Wales =

- Centuries: 16th; 17th; 18th; 19th; 20th
- Decades: 1690s; 1700s; 1710s; 1720s; 1730s
- See also: List of years in Wales; Timeline of Welsh history 1710 in Great Britain Scotland Elsewhere

This article is about the particular significance of the year 1710 to Wales and its people.

== Incumbents ==
- Lord Lieutenant of North Wales (Lord Lieutenant of Anglesey, Caernarvonshire, Denbighshire, Flintshire, Merionethshire, Montgomeryshire) – Hugh Cholmondeley, 1st Earl of Cholmondeley
- Lord Lieutenant of South Wales (Lord Lieutenant of Glamorgan, Brecknockshire, Cardiganshire, Carmarthenshire, Monmouthshire, Pembrokeshire, Radnorshire) – Thomas Herbert, 8th Earl of Pembroke
- Bishop of Bangor – John Evans
- Bishop of Llandaff – John Tyler
- Bishop of St Asaph – William Fleetwood
- Bishop of St Davids – George Bull (until 17 February) Philip Bisse (from 19 November)

== Events ==
- 21 March – A verdict is given in the trial of High Church clergyman Henry Sacheverell, leading to riots breaking out in a number of places, including Wrexham, where a rabble breaks the windows of dissenters' homes and their meeting house.
- 10 June – Watkin Williams-Wynn, heir to a baronetcy, establishes the "Cycle of the White Rose", a Jacobite group, in North Wales.
- 30 September - John Ellis becomes Rector of Llandwrog and is made a canon of Bangor Cathedral.
- October/November - In the 1710 British general election:
  - John Meyrick becomes MP for Cardigan Boroughs.
  - Sir Thomas Powell, 1st Baronet, becomes MP for Carmarthenshire.
  - Sir Edward Stradling, 5th Baronet, becomes MP for Cardiff.
- exact dates unknown
  - John Wynne obtains permission from the bishop's court to change the name of Trelawnyd to "Newmarket", in his quest to make it a centre of the lead industry.
  - A committee of the House of Commons declares Sir Humphrey Mackworth guilty of "many notorious and scandalous frauds". These included secretly diverting shares into his own account and using the proceeds to pay his own expenses.
  - A Visitation of the Archdeaconry of Carmarthen to Llandissilio finds that, out of about 120 families in the parish, 40 attend church at Easter, 20 at Whitsuntide and 20 at Christmas and notes that "the Minister suffers in his reputation for being addicted to drinking and swearing".
  - William Fleetwood, Bishop of St Asaph, encourages his clergy to preach in the Welsh language.

== Arts and literature ==
=== New books ===
- John Davies - Flores Poetarum Britannicorum
- Henry Rowlands - Antiquilates Parochiales

== Births ==
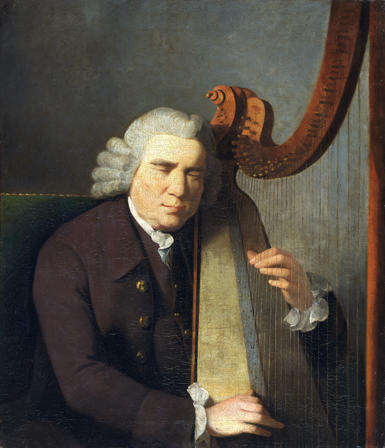
John Parry, c.1710-1782

- 16 May - William Talbot, 1st Earl Talbot, politician (died 1782)
- 11 July - Sir John Morgan, 4th Baronet, politician (died 1767)
- probable
  - John Parry, harpist (died 1782)
  - Thomas Richards of Coychurch, lexicographer (died 1790)

== Deaths ==
- 1 January - William Lloyd, bishop of Norwich, 72
- 17 February - George Bull, bishop of St David's, 75
- April - Robert Morgan, Baptist minister,
- 8 July - Robert Davies, scholar and son-in-law of Edward Vaughan of Trawsgoed, 52
- 18 September - John Annesley, 4th Earl of Anglesey, 34

== See also ==
- 1710 in Scotland
