= Josh Andrews =

Josh Andrews may refer to:

- Josh Andrews (American football) (born 1991), NFL player
- Josh Andrews (footballer) (born 2001), English footballer

== See also ==
- Joshua Andrews (1708?–1793), Welsh Baptist minister
