= 1706 in Scotland =

- Centuries: 16th; 17th; 18th; 19th; 20th
- Decades: 1680s; 1690s; 1700s; 1710s; 1720s
- See also: List of years in Scotland; Timeline of Scottish history 1706 in: England • Wales • Elsewhere

Events from the year 1706 in the Kingdom of Scotland.

== Incumbents ==
- Monarch – Anne

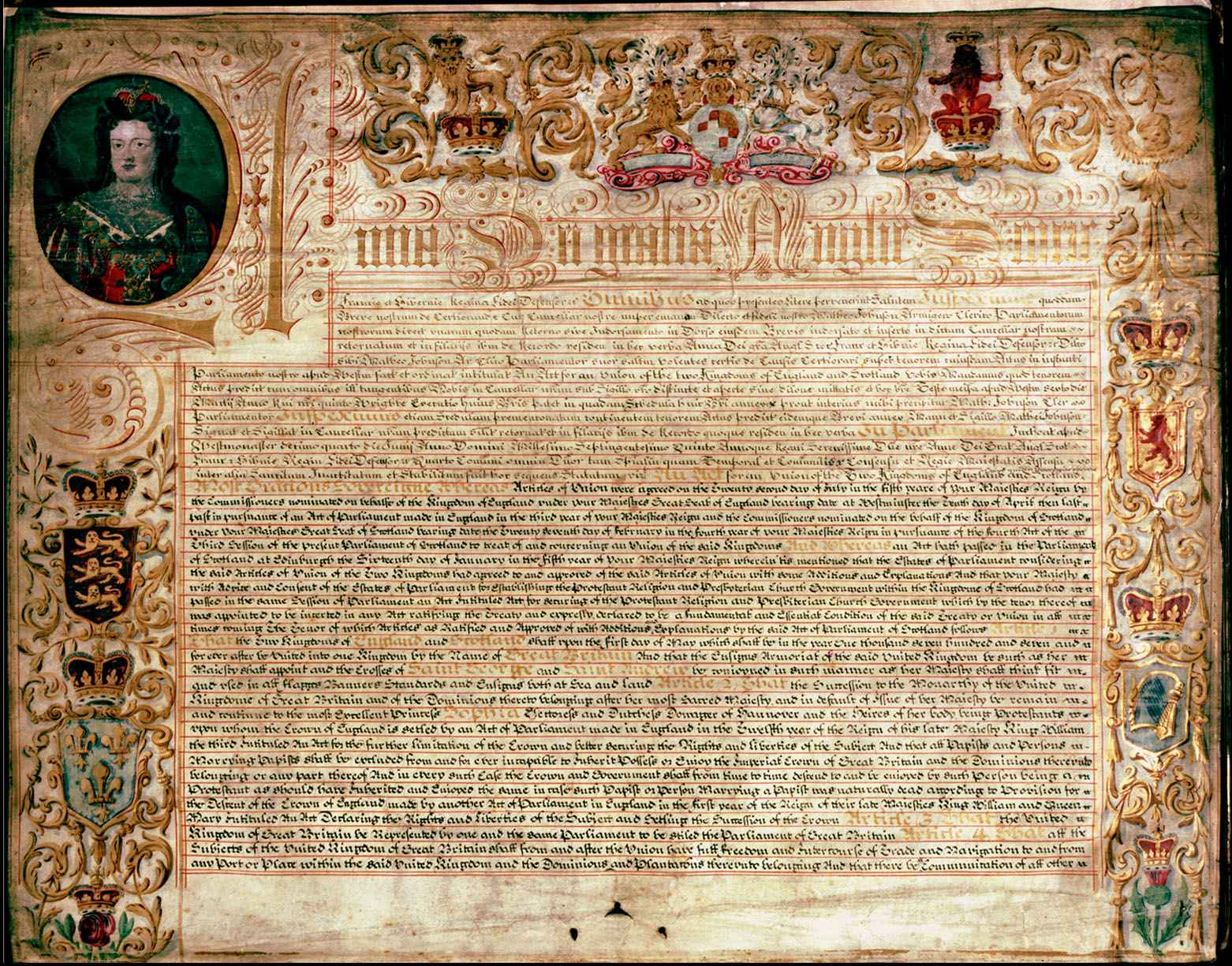
The Treaty of Union

- Secretary of State – Hugh Campbell, 3rd Earl of Loudoun, jointly with John Erskine, 6th Earl of Mar

=== Law officers ===
- Lord Advocate – Sir James Stewart
- Solicitor General for Scotland – William Carmichael

=== Judiciary ===
- Lord President of the Court of Session – Lord North Berwick
- Lord Justice General – Lord Tarbat
- Lord Justice Clerk – Lord Ormiston

== Events ==
- April – commissioners assemble in London to agree a Treaty of Union between Scotland and England.
- 22 July – Treaty of Union agreed in London.
- c. September – Daniel Defoe is sent to Edinburgh as an English government agent to promote ratification of the Treaty of Union.
- 3 October – opening of the Parliament of Scotland which will debate the Union.
- 19 October – an Edinburgh mob opposed to the Union threatens the Lord Provost.
- 4 November – the Parliament of Scotland votes in favour of the Union with England Act by 116 votes to 83.
- 6 November – a Glasgow mob opposed to the Union threatens the Lord Provost.
- 20 November – a copy of the Treaty of Union is burnt publicly in Dumfries.
- Lord Archibald Campbell is created 1st Earl of Ilay.

== Births ==
- 1 April – Alexander Boswell, Lord Auchinleck judge (died 1782)

Date unknown

- James Abercrombie British Army general (died 1781)
- Walter Goodall, writer (died 1766)
- John Maule, Member of the Parliament of Great Britain (died 1781)
- William Stewart, Member of the Parliament of Great Britain (died 1748)

== Deaths ==
- 25 August – Lord John Hay, soldier (born c. 1668)

Date unknown

- Sir John Hay of Alderston, 1st Baronet

== The arts ==
- A Choice Collection of Comic and Serious Scots Poems both ancient and modern, by several hands edited by James Watson begins publication in Edinburgh.

== See also ==
- Timeline of Scottish history
