= 1709 in Scotland =

- Centuries: 16th; 17th; 18th; 19th; 20th
- Decades: 1680s; 1690s; 1700s; 1710s; 1720s
- See also: List of years in Scotland; Timeline of Scottish history 1709 in: Great Britain • Wales • Elsewhere

Events from the year 1709 in Scotland.

== Incumbents ==
- Secretary of State for Scotland: The Earl of Mar, until 3 February 1709; then The Duke of Queensberry

=== Law officers ===
- Lord Advocate – Sir James Stewart; then Sir David Dalrymple, 1st Baronet
- Solicitor General for Scotland – William Carmichael; then Thomas Kennedy, jointly with Sir James Steuart, Bt.

=== Judiciary ===
- Lord President of the Court of Session – Lord North Berwick
- Lord Justice General – Lord Tarbat
- Lord Justice Clerk – Lord Ormiston

== Events ==
- 1 or 2 February – marooned Lower Largo-born privateer Alexander Selkirk, the original Robinson Crusoe, is rescued after four years living on the Juan Fernández Islands and begins his return to civilisation.
- 26 April – Act of the General Assembly of the Church of Scotland for the provision of public libraries in presbyteries.
- 3 May – Elspeth Rule becomes the last person in Scotland to be tried before the High Court of Justiciary for witchcraft; the judge, sitting at Dumfries, orders her to be burned on the cheek and banished from Scotland for life.
- 1 July – Treason Act 1708 comes into force, harmonising the law of high treason in Scotland with that of England.
- Summer – bad weather causes a poor harvest with consequent distress.
- 5 October – last Scottish coinage issued by a mint in Scotland, at Edinburgh.
- Society in Scotland for Propagating Christian Knowledge established by royal charter.
- Appointment of the first Chair of Oriental Languages in the University of Glasgow, Charles Morthland.
- First clout archery competition for the Edinburgh Arrow held by the Royal Company of Archers and won by David Drummond, advocate.

== Births ==
Date unknown

- John Armstrong, physician and poet (died 1779)

== Deaths ==
- 24 June – Robert Lauder of Beilmouth, lawyer and Clerk of Exchequer

== See also ==
- 1709 in Great Britain
