= 1710 in Scotland =

- Centuries: 16th; 17th; 18th; 19th; 20th
- Decades: 1690s; 1700s; 1710s; 1720s; 1730s
- See also: List of years in Scotland; Timeline of Scottish history 1710 in: Great Britain • Wales • Elsewhere

Events from the year 1710 in Scotland.

== Incumbents ==
- Secretary of State for Scotland: The Duke of Queensberry

=== Law officers ===
- Lord Advocate – Sir David Dalrymple, 1st Baronet
- Solicitor General for Scotland – Thomas Kennedy jointly with Sir James Steuart, Bt

=== Judiciary ===
- Lord President of the Court of Session – Lord North Berwick
- Lord Justice General – Lord Tarbat until 23 October; then Lord Ilay
- Lord Justice Clerk – Lord Ormiston, then Lord Grange

== Events ==
- Dry stone dykes (that is, walls) built in Galloway to enclose land on a large scale.
- Dancing "assemblies" in Edinburgh begin.

== Births ==
- 15 April – William Cullen, physician, chemist and agriculturalist (died 1790)
- 25 April – James Ferguson, astronomer, instrument and globe maker (died 1776)

== Deaths ==
- 1 January – William Bruce, architect (born 1630)
- 1 June – David Mitchell, admiral (born 1642)
- 20 September – John Carmichael, 1st Earl of Hyndford, nobleman and politician (born 1638)
- 10 December – Robert Mylne, the last Master Mason to the Crown of Scotland (born 1633)

== See also ==
- 1710 in Great Britain
