= 1705 in Scotland =

- Centuries: 16th; 17th; 18th; 19th; 20th
- Decades: 1680s; 1690s; 1700s; 1710s; 1720s
- See also: List of years in Scotland; Timeline of Scottish history 1705 in: England • Wales • Elsewhere

Events from the year 1705 in the Kingdom of Scotland.

== Incumbents ==
- Monarch – Anne
- Secretary of State –
  - until March: John Ker, 5th Earl of Roxburghe jointly with James Ogilvy, 1st Earl of Seafield
  - March–June: John Ker, 5th Earl of Roxburghe jointly with William Johnstone, 1st Marquess of Annandale
  - June–September: William Johnstone, 1st Marquess of Annandale jointly with Hugh Campbell, 3rd Earl of Loudoun
  - from September: Hugh Campbell, 3rd Earl of Loudoun, jointly with John Erskine, 6th Earl of Mar

=== Law officers ===
- Lord Advocate – Sir James Stewart
- Solicitor General for Scotland – William Carmichael

=== Judiciary ===
- Lord President of the Court of Session – Lord North Berwick
- Lord Justice General – Lord Tarbat
- Lord Justice Clerk – Lord Whitelaw, then Lord Ormiston

== Events ==
- 30 January – Janet Cornfoot is killed by a mob, and Thomas Brown is starved to death, for accusations of witchcraft at Pittenweem subsequently exposed as perjuries.
- 14–19 February – date of first Edinburgh Courant newspaper published, by printer James Watson.
- March – the Parliament of England passes the Alien Act in response to the Parliament of Scotland's Act of Security 1704; it is repealed in December without taking effect.
- 11 April – English captain Thomas Green and two of his crew are hanged at Leith for alleged piracy on the Malabar Coast.
- 20 July – Act of the Parliament of Scotland for the promotion of salmon, white and herring fishing.
- September – negotiations for a Treaty of Union with England are resumed. At about this time, the independent pro-Union group around John Hay, 2nd Marquess of Tweeddale, is first nicknamed the Squadrone Volante.
- Lord Archibald Campbell appointed Lord High Treasurer of Scotland.

== Births ==
- 2 March – William Murray, 1st Earl of Mansfield, judge and politician (died 1793)
- 5 May – John Campbell, 4th Earl of Loudoun, noble and military leader (died 1782)

Date unknown

- David Mallet, writer (died 1765)

== Deaths ==
- 11 March – Margaret Wemyss, 3rd Countess of Wemyss (born 1659)
- 14 March – James Scott, Earl of Dalkeith (born 1674)

Date unknown

- Alexander Arbuthnot, politician (born 1654)

== See also ==
- Timeline of Scottish history
