= 1711 in Scotland =

- Centuries: 16th; 17th; 18th; 19th; 20th
- Decades: 1690s; 1700s; 1710s; 1720s; 1730s
- See also: List of years in Scotland; Timeline of Scottish history 1711 in: Great Britain • Wales • Elsewhere

Events from the year 1711 in Scotland.

== Incumbents ==
- Secretary of State for Scotland: The Duke of Queensberry, until 6 July; then The Earl of Mar

=== Law officers ===
- Lord Advocate – Sir David Dalrymple, 1st Baronet; then Sir James Stewart
- Solicitor General for Scotland – Thomas Kennedy jointly with Sir James Steuart, Bt.

=== Judiciary ===
- Lord President of the Court of Session – Lord North Berwick
- Lord Justice General – Lord Ilay (appointed this year to the Privy Council of the United Kingdom)
- Lord Justice Clerk – Lord Grange

== Events ==
- 5 April (Easter Sunday) – Elgin Cathedral's central tower collapses.
- 7 November – Dutch East Indiaman Liefde runs aground and sinks off Out Skerries, Shetland with the loss of all but one of her 300 crew.
- Church Patronage (Scotland) Act 1711 (becoming law 1 May 1712) restores the right of patrons to present ministers to Church of Scotland churches.
- Scottish Episcopalians Act 1711 (becoming law 3 March 1712) tolerates the right of the Scottish Episcopal Church to continue its Anglican form of liturgy and communion.
- Scotts Shipbuilding and Engineering Company founded at Greenock.
- Weir constructed at Forestmill on the Black Devon by George Sorocold to feed Gartmorn Dam reservoir.
- Export duty on linen.

== Births ==
- 26 April – David Hume, philosopher and economist (died 1776)
- 12 October – William Tytler, historian (died 1792)

Date unknown

- Alan Breck Stewart, Jacobite (died c. 1791 in exile)

== Deaths ==
- 6 July – James Douglas, 2nd Duke of Queensberry, politician (born 1662; died in London)

Date unknown

- Sir James Foulis, 3rd Baronet, judge (born c. 1645)
- Adam Brown of Blackford, Lord Provost of Edinburgh died in office

== The arts ==
- Publication of Choice Collection of Comic and Serious Scots Poems edited by James Watson concludes in Edinburgh.

== See also ==
- Timeline of Scottish history
