= 1715 in Wales =

- Centuries: 16th; 17th; 18th; 19th; 20th
- Decades: 1690s; 1700s; 1710s; 1720s; 1730s
- See also: List of years in Wales; Timeline of Welsh history 1715 in Great Britain Scotland Elsewhere

This article is about the particular significance of the year 1715 to Wales and its people.

== Incumbents ==
- Lord Lieutenant of North Wales (Lord Lieutenant of Anglesey, Caernarvonshire, Denbighshire, Flintshire, Merionethshire, Montgomeryshire) – Hugh Cholmondeley, 1st Earl of Cholmondeley
- Lord Lieutenant of South Wales (Lord Lieutenant of Glamorgan, Brecknockshire, Cardiganshire, Carmarthenshire, Monmouthshire, Pembrokeshire, Radnorshire) – Thomas Herbert, 8th Earl of Pembroke (until 14 October); after this date, Lord Lieutenants are appointed for each individual county.
- Bishop of Bangor – John Evans
- Bishop of Llandaff – John Tyler
- Bishop of St Asaph – John Wynne
- Bishop of St Davids – Adam Ottley

== Events ==
- 6 February - John Wynne is enthroned as Bishop of St Asaph.
- 9 February - An advertisement appears in the London Gazette for the first St David's Day dinner in London, to be followed by a sermon given by Rev George Lewis.
- 1 March - The Society of Antient Britons is founded in London. Thomas Jones, its first treasurer and secretary, presents the society's "loyal address" to King George I and is subsequently knighted.
- March - Owen Meyrick, a Whig, challenges the supremacy of the Tory Bulkeley family in Anglesey by being elected to Parliament for the constituency.
- September - William Herbert, 2nd Marquess of Powis, is among those arrested in connection with the first Jacobite Rebellion.
- 9 November - Silvanus Bevan marries Elizabeth, daughter of royal clockmaker Daniel Quare.

== Arts and literature ==
=== New books ===
- John Roderick - Welsh almanack (first in the series)

== Births ==
- 7 March (in Massachusetts) - Ephraim Williams, American landowner and slave owner of Welsh descent, founder of Williams College (died 1755)

== Deaths ==
- 1 January - John Morgan, lord of the manor and lordship of Gwynllwg, merchant and MP for Monmouth Boroughs, 74?
- 16 January - Robert Nelson, philanthropist and non-juror, 58
- 29 June - Richard Lucas, clergyman and author, 66?
- 29 October - John Barlow, MP for Pembrokeshire, 57?
- 19 December - Robert Jones, MP for Glamorganshire, 33

== See also ==
- 1715 in Scotland
