= 1710 in Great Britain =

Events from the year 1710 in Great Britain.

== Incumbents ==
- Monarch – Anne

== Events ==
- January – food shortages in major cities due to the harsh winter.
- 27 February–21 March – trial of Henry Sacheverell for preaching criticism of the Glorious Revolution which is considered subversive by the Whig government.
- 1 March – riots in London, in support of Sacheverell.
- 10 April – the Statute of Anne, the world's first copyright legislation, becomes effective.
- 19 April – Queen Anne meets the Four Mohawk Kings in London.
- 9 July – Louis XIV of France withdraws from peace negotiations with Britain taking place at Geertruidenberg.
- 16 July – War of the Spanish Succession: Battle of Almenar: victory of the Habsburg monarchy in alliance with Britain against Bourbon Spain.
- 9 August – War of the Spanish Succession: Battle of Saragossa: victory of the Habsburg monarchy in alliance with Britain against Bourbon Spain.
- 11 August – a Tory administration is formed with Robert Harley as Chancellor of the Exchequer following the fall of the Whig government.
- 13 October – Queen Anne's War: The French surrender ending the Siege of Port Royal gives the British permanent possession of Nova Scotia.
- 25 November – following the general election, the fourth parliament of Queen Anne's reign is composed mainly of Tory MPs.
- 8–9 December – War of the Spanish Succession: Battle of Brihuega: The British are defeated by French and Spanish troops.

== Publications ==
- John Arbuthnot's paper An Argument for Divine Providence, Taken From the Constant Regularity Observ'd in the Births of Both Sexes.

== Births ==
- 12 March – Thomas Augustine Arne, composer (died 1778)
- 15 April – William Cullen, Scottish physician and chemist (died 1790)
- 17 April – Henry Erskine, 10th Earl of Buchan, Scottish Freemason (died 1767)
- 25 April – James Ferguson, Scottish astronomer (died 1776)
- 26 April – Thomas Reid, Scottish philosopher (died 1796)
- 16 May – William Talbot, 1st Earl Talbot, politician (died 1782)
- 10 June – James Short, mathematician and optician (died 1768)
- 13 August – William Heberden, physician (died 1801)
- 19 August – Charles Wyndham, 2nd Earl of Egremont, statesman (died 1763)
- 20 August – Thomas Simpson, mathematician (died 1761)
- 30 September – John Russell, 4th Duke of Bedford, statesman (d. 1771)
- 24 October – Alban Butler, Catholic priest and writer (died 1773)
- 8 November – Sarah Fielding, writer (died 1768)
- 27 November – Robert Lowth, bishop and grammarian (died 1787)

== Deaths ==
- 1 January – William Bruce, Scottish architect (born c. 1630)
- 5 March – John Holt, Lord Chief Justice (born 1642)
- 28 April – Thomas Betterton, English actor (born c. 1635)
- 1 June – David Mitchell, Scottish admiral (born 1642)

== See also ==
- 1710 in Wales
