= 1708 in Scotland =

- Centuries: 16th; 17th; 18th; 19th; 20th
- Decades: 1680s; 1690s; 1700s; 1710s; 1720s
- See also: List of years in Scotland; Timeline of Scottish history 1708 in: Great Britain • England • Wales • Elsewhere

Events from the year 1708 in Scotland.

== Incumbents ==
- Secretary of State for Scotland: The Earl of Mar

=== Law officers ===
- Lord Advocate – Sir James Stewart
- Solicitor General for Scotland – William Carmichael

=== Judiciary ===
- Lord President of the Court of Session – Lord North Berwick
- Lord Justice General – Lord Tarbat
- Lord Justice Clerk – Lord Ormiston

== Events ==
- 11 March – Queen Anne withholds Royal Assent from the Scottish Militia Bill, the last time a British monarch vetoes legislation.
- 23 March – James Francis Edward Stuart unsuccessfully tries to land at Burntisland on the Firth of Forth with a French fleet.
- 30 April – 7 July – British general election: New Scottish Westminster constituencies are used for the first time.
- 1 May – Privy Council of Scotland abolished.
- Treason Act harmonises the law of high treason in Scotland with that of England.
- Chairs of Moral Philosophy and of Logic & Metaphysics established in the University of Edinburgh. Regent system of teaching here abolished.

== Births ==
- 15 February – Alexander Hume-Campbell, nobleman and politician (died 1760)
- 8 March – John Campbell, author (died 1775)

Date unknown

- Thomas Gillespie, Presbyterian minister and founder of the Relief Church (died 1774)
- William Guthrie, historian (died 1770)

== Deaths ==
- 21 June – John Hamilton, 2nd Lord Belhaven and Stenton, anti-Union politician (born 1656; died in London)
- 10 October – David Gregory, mathematician and astronomer (born 1659)
- 16 November – Alexander Edward, Episcopalian minister, architect and landscape designer (born 1651)

== See also ==
- 1708 in Great Britain
