= 1781 in Scotland =

- Centuries: 16th; 17th; 18th; 19th; 20th
- Decades: 1760s; 1770s; 1780s; 1790s; 1800s
- See also: List of years in Scotland; Timeline of Scottish history 1781 in: Great Britain • Wales • Elsewhere

Events from the year 1781 in Scotland.

== Incumbents ==
=== Law officers ===
- Lord Advocate – Henry Dundas;
- Solicitor General for Scotland – Alexander Murray

=== Judiciary ===
- Lord President of the Court of Session – Lord Arniston, the younger
- Lord Justice General – The Viscount Stormont
- Lord Justice Clerk – Lord Barskimming

== Events ==
- Construction of The Mound in Edinburgh begins.
- Montrose Lunatic Asylum, Infirmary & Dispensary, predecessor of Sunnyside Royal Hospital, founded by Susan Carnegie.
- John Howie begins publication of the 2nd edition of his Biographia Scoticana (Scots Worthies): A Brief Historical Account of the Lives, Characters, and Memorable Transactions of the Most Eminent Scots Worthies.

== Births ==
- March (probable) – John Burnet, engraver and painter (died 1868)
- 16 March – William Mitchell, entrepreneur (died 1854)
- 19 March – John Henry Wishart, surgeon (died 1834)
- 12 June (probable) – Christian Isobel Johnstone, journalist and novelist (died 1857)
- 12 September – John Grieve, poet (died 1836)
- 14 September – James Walker, civil engineer (died 1862)
- 18 September – Allan Burns, surgeon (died 1813)
- 30 November – Alexander Berry, adventurer and Australian pioneer (died 1873 in Australia)
- 11 December – David Brewster, physicist (died 1868)

== Deaths ==
- 31 March – Robert Watson, historian (born c. 1730)
- 2 July – John Maule, MP (born 1706)

== The arts ==
- 4 July – Robert Burns joins the Freemasons at Tarbolton.
- 12 October – first bagpipes competition in the Masonic Arms, Falkirk.

== See also ==
- Timeline of Scottish history
