= 1729 in Wales =

- Centuries: 16th; 17th; 18th; 19th; 20th
- Decades: 1700s; 1710s; 1720s; 1730s; 1740s
- See also: List of years in Wales; Timeline of Welsh history 1729 in Great Britain Scotland Elsewhere

This article is about the particular significance of the year 1729 to Wales and its people.

== Incumbents ==
- Lord Lieutenant of North Wales (Lord Lieutenant of Anglesey, Caernarvonshire, Denbighshire, Flintshire, Merionethshire, Montgomeryshire) – George Cholmondeley, 2nd Earl of Cholmondeley
- Lord Lieutenant of Glamorgan – Charles Powlett, 3rd Duke of Bolton (from 26 March)
- Lord Lieutenant of Brecknockshire and Lord Lieutenant of Monmouthshire – Sir William Morgan of Tredegar
- Lord Lieutenant of Cardiganshire – John Vaughan, 2nd Viscount Lisburne
- Lord Lieutenant of Carmarthenshire – vacant until 1755
- Lord Lieutenant of Pembrokeshire – Sir Arthur Owen, 3rd Baronet
- Lord Lieutenant of Radnorshire – James Brydges, 1st Duke of Chandos
- Bishop of Bangor – Thomas Sherlock
- Bishop of Llandaff – Robert Clavering (until 17 February); John Harris (from 19 October)
- Bishop of St Asaph – Francis Hare
- Bishop of St Davids – Richard Smalbroke

== Events ==
- 8 January - Prince Frederick, son of King George II, is created Prince of Wales, nearly two years after his father's accession.
- 1 March - A St. David's Society is established by Welsh immigrants in Philadelphia.
- 13 March - Bussy Mansel, 4th Baron Mansel, marries Barbara Villiers, daughter of William Villiers, 2nd Earl of Jersey.
- 26 March - Charles Powlett, 3rd Duke of Bolton is sworn in as Lord Lieutenant of Glamorgan, the post having been vacant since 1715. After 1729, all Lords Lieutenant were also Custos Rotulorum of Glamorgan.
- 19 October - John Harris is consecrated as Bishop of Llandaff.
- date unknown
  - Zachariah Williams is admitted as a poor brother pensioner of the Charterhouse in London.
  - Lewis Morris, eldest of the noted Morris brothers of Anglesey, becomes a customs official.

== Arts and literature ==
=== New books ===
- Christmas Samuel - Golwg ar y Testament Newydd
- Thomas Sherlock – The Tryal of the Witnesses of the Resurrection of Jesus

== Births ==
- 6 January - Anne Penny, née Hughes, poet (died 1784)
- probable - Joseph Turner, architect (died 1807)

== Deaths ==
- 29 April - Sir Stephen Glynne, 3rd Baronet, 64
- June - Thomas Baddy, Independent minister and author
- July - Sir Stephen Glynne, 4th Baronet, 35?
- 1 September - Sir Richard Steele, satirist, 57
- unknown date - Malachi Jones, Welsh clergyman in Pennsylvania
