= William Richards (priest) =

English clergyman and author

William Richards (1643–1705) was an English clergyman and author.

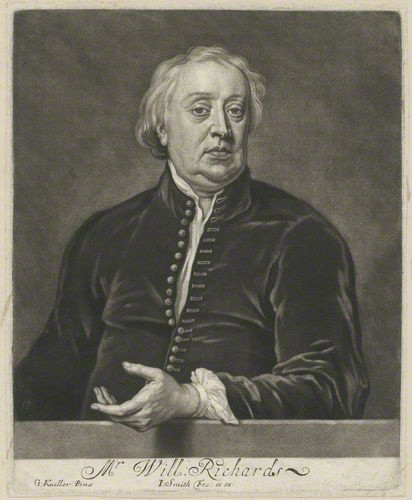
William Richards, 1688 engraving by John Smith after Godfrey Kneller.

== Life ==
He was born at Helmdon, Northamptonshire, in 1643, the son of Ralph Richards, rector there from 1641 to 1668. He entered Trinity College, Oxford in 1658 as a commoner, matriculated 3 May 1659, and became a scholar 13 June 1661. He graduated B.A. 24 February 1663, M.A. 1666, and was elected a fellow of his college on 15 June 1666. He took holy orders, and was chosen preacher at Marston, Oxfordshire. On his father's death in 1668, Richards, to whom the living of Helmdon reverted, appointed to it Thomas Richards, probably a relative, and continued to hold his fellowship until 1675, when he instituted himself to Helmdon.

Richards, who was a nonjuror, was appointed on 25 July 1689 by the corporation of Newcastle-on-Tyne as lecturer of St. Andrew's Church in the city. He was buried in the chancel of St. Andrew's on 22 August 1705.

== Works ==
In June 1673 he travelled to Wales on business for a friend. The result was the publication in London in 1682 of a short satirical work entitled ‘Wallography, or the Britton described,’ dedicated with fanciful rhetoric to Sir Richard Wenman of Casswell. It was published under Richards's initials only, and was subsequently, in error, ascribed to Jonathan Swift.

He also wrote ‘The English Orator, or Rhetorical Descant by way of Declamation upon some notable themes, both Historical and Philosophical,’ 2 parts, London, 1680. Anthony Wood says he translated and edited with notes (completed in 1690) the ‘Nova Reperta, sive Rerum memorabilium libri duo’ of Guido Panciroli. An anonymous English translation was published in 1715 (London, 2 vols).

== Notes ==
Attribution

This article incorporates text from a publication now in the public domain: "Richards, William (1643-1705)". Dictionary of National Biography. London: Smith, Elder & Co. 1885–1900.
