= Richard Farrington =

Richard Farrington (1702 – 16 October 1772) was a Welsh Anglican priest and antiquarian.

== Life ==
Farrington was born in 1702 and was educated at the University of Oxford, matriculating from Jesus College, Oxford in 1720 and obtaining his BA in 1724. After ordination and his first curacy, possibly at Gresford, he moved to Bromfield before becoming linked to St Asaph Cathedral in 1739. He was later appointed vicar of Llanwnda and Llanfaglan (1741), rector of Llangybi (1742) and chancellor of Bangor Cathedral (1762). He resigned from his positions in August 1772 and died in Bath on 16 October 1772, at the age of 71.

He became known as an antiquarian, with a particular interest in Caernarfonshire. He wrote Numismata Dinlleana, The Druid Monuments of Snowdonia and Celtic Antiquities of Snowdon, the manuscripts of all of which are now held by the National Library of Wales. His other works include Twenty Sermons by R Farrington (1742).
