= 1705 in England =

- Centuries: 16th; 17th; 18th; 19th; 20th
- Decades: 1680s; 1690s; 1700s; 1710s; 1720s
- See also: Other events of 1705

Events from the year 1705 in England.

== Incumbents ==
- Monarch – Anne

== Events ==
- 16 April – Isaac Newton is knighted by Queen Anne at Trinity College, Cambridge.
- 14 March – The Alien Act 1705 (a response to the Parliament of Scotland's Act of Security 1704) provides that Scottish nationals in England would be treated as aliens (foreign nationals), and estates held by Scots would be treated as alien property, and also that trade embargoes would be placed on Scottish staple products, unless the Scots enter into negotiations regarding a proposed Treaty of Union of the parliaments of Scotland and England by 25 December.
- 20 March (31 March N.S.) – Twelfth Siege of Gibraltar: a fleet of 35 warships from the navies of England, Portugal and the Netherlands, commanded by English Admiral John Leake, arrives at the Bay of Gibraltar with English and Portuguese troop reinforcements. The French and Spanish retreat by 3 May.
- 5 April – The 1st Parliament of Queen Anne (elected in 1702) is dissolved.
- 9 April – The Queen's Theatre is opened in the Haymarket, Westminster, by John Vanbrugh and William Congreve, serving as an opera house, premiering with Gli amori di ergasto ("The Loves of Ergasto"), an Italian language opera by German composer Jakob "Giacomo" Greber. A theatre remains in operation on this site for more than 300 years, becoming Her Majesty's Theatre.
- 7 May–6 June – General election results in no clear majority for either political faction in the House of Commons but increased influence for the Whigs. During the campaign there is mob violence in some constituencies.
- 20 June – The Pact of Genoa is signed by representatives of England and the Spanish Principality of Catalonia as a military alliance providing for English troops to be stationed in Catalonia as part of the War of Spanish Succession.
- 14 July – The newly-elected 2nd Parliament of Queen Anne, the last to serve before the union with Scotland that produces Great Britain, is opened by the Queen.
- 18 July – War of the Spanish Succession: The Battle of Elixheim is fought near the city of Tienen in the Low Countries. Soldiers under the command of England's Duke of Marlborough kill 3,000 French troops under the command of the Duc de Valleroy and force the retreat of the remainder, breaking the "Lines of Brabant". Because his troops are exhausted, Marlborough is unable to send them in pursuit.
- 25 September – Queen Anne appoints commissioners to negotiate a Treaty of Union of the parliaments of Scotland and England.
- 3 or 4 October – 31 people are killed in a colliery explosion at the Stony Flatt pit in Gateshead on Tyneside, the earliest major British colliery disaster for which there is reliable evidence.
- 15 October – War of the Spanish Succession: Charles Mordaunt, 3rd Earl of Peterborough, leads an English naval force in the capture of Barcelona.
- 30 October – John Vanbrugh's play The Confederacy (adapted from the French) is first performed at his new London playhouse, The Queen's Theatre.
- 23 November – Nicholas Rowe's play Ulysses is first performed in London, starring Thomas Betterton.
- 27 December – John Vanbrugh's play The Mistake (adapted from the French) is first performed at his new London playhouse, The Queen's Theatre.
- 21 December – The Sophia Naturalization Act is passed by Parliament, which naturalizes Sophia of Hanover (next in succession to the British throne) and the Protestant "issue of her body" as British subjects.

=== Undated ===
- Construction begins on Blenheim Palace in Oxfordshire designed by John Vanbrugh for the Duke of Marlborough and partly funded by the Crown. It is completed in 1724.
- Edmond Halley publicly predicts the periodicity of Halley's Comet and computes its expected path of return in 1758.

== Births ==
- 21 February – Edward Hawke, 1st Baron Hawke, naval officer (died 1781)
- 11 April – William Cookworthy, chemist (died 1780)
- 23 July – Francis Blomefield, topographer (died 1752)
- 30 August – David Hartley, philosopher (died 1757)
- 21 September (bapt.) – Dick Turpin, thief and highwayman (hanged 1739)
- 28 September – Henry Fox, 1st Baron Holland, statesman (died 1774)
- 23 November – Thomas Birch, historian (died 1766)
- Undated – Bay Bolton, racehorse (died 1736)

== Deaths ==
- 17 January – John Ray, naturalist (born 1627)
- 6 April – Sir William Lowther, 1st Baronet, of Marske, landowner and Member of Parliament (born 1676)
- 12 July – Titus Oates, conspirator (born 1649)
