= Benjamin Meredith =

Benjamin Meredith (1700–1749) was a Welsh Baptist minister. He was born in Llanwenarth, Monmouthshire, the son of Baptist preacher William Meredith. Benjamin began preaching in 1720 and in 1730 he took charge of Llanbryn-mair Independent church. He was ordained in 1733 but was asked to resign in 1734 due to his unorthodox views. He then returned to Llanwenarth, however disagreements regarding the doctrine of the Trinity led to his dismissal from the church there in 1748, together with a few other members. He therefore preached near the chapel and later in his own home.

Benjamin Meredith is known for his 1721 translation of Jerusalem Sinner Saved (by John Bunyan) into Welsh.
