= Henry Hall (poet) =

English composer (c1656-1707)

Henry Hall (c. 1656 – 30 March 1707) was a 17th-century English composer of church and secular music and also a poet.

Hall, a contemporary of Henry Purcell, received his musical education under Pelham Humfrey and Dr John Blow and as one of the boys of the Chapel Royal. He took a temporary post at Wells Cathedral in the summer of 1674, but by August of that year he had secured permanent employment at Exeter Cathedral as organist and lay vicar choral. Hall remained at Exeter until sometime before 27 June 1679 when he became assistant organist to John Badham at Hereford Cathedral. On Badham's death in September 1688, became organist of Hereford Cathedral. He held this post until his death in March 1707, in Hereford, when he was succeeded by his son, Henry Hall junior, as he is typically described, who also served as organist until his own death in 1714.
