= David Evans (canon at St Asaph) =

- Born: 1705; Llangynyw, Wales
- Died: 1788 (aged 82–83); Llanymynech, Wales
- Occupation: Clergyman

David Evans (1705–1788) was a Welsh Anglican priest, writer and musician.

== Life ==
Evans was born in Llangynyw, Montgomeryshire, Wales, where his father (also called David Evans) was the local priest. After studying at Jesus College, Oxford, where he obtained a Bachelor of Arts degree in 1728 and Master of Arts degree in 1731, he was ordained into the Church of England. In 1734 he was appointed to the parish of Llanddwyn. In 1737, he became the rector of Llanerfyl, moving to Llanymynech in 1767 and becoming a canon of St Asaph in 1772. He died in 1788 and was buried at Llanymynech.

Evans was known for his scholarship, and helped other writers obtain material for their works: Charles Burney (helping with his History of Music) and Edward Jones (providing folk tunes for Musical and Poetical Relicks of the Welsh Bards [1784]). He was also asked by a friend to provide Samuel Johnson with English words deriving from Welsh for inclusion in Johnson's dictionary.
