= 1739 in Great Britain =

Events from the year 1739 in Great Britain.

== Incumbents ==
- Monarch – George II
- Prime Minister – Robert Walpole (Whig)

== Events ==
- 14 January – Britain and Spain sign the Convention of Pardo.
- 16 January – first performance of George Frideric Handel's oratorio Saul at the His Majesty's Theatre, London.
- February – George Whitefield first preaches in the open air, to miners at Kingswood, South Gloucestershire.
- April – John Wesley first preaches in the open air, at Whitefield's invitation.
- 4 April – first performance of Handel's oratorio Israel in Egypt at the King's Theatre, London.
- 12 May – John Wesley lays the foundation stone of the New Room, Bristol, the world's first Methodist meeting house.
- 17 October – the Foundling Hospital in London, established by Thomas Coram, is granted its royal charter.
- 23 October – "War of Jenkins' Ear" (1739–1742) begins when Britain declares war on Spain.
- 20–22 November – War of Jenkins' Ear: Battle of Porto Bello: British marine forces capture the Panamanian silver exporting town of Porto Bello from the Spanish.
- 25 December–February 1740 – the 'Great Frost': unusually harsh winter in southern England and Ireland.

== Publications ==
- January (dated 9 February) – The Scots Magazine first published.
- David Hume's anonymous A Treatise of Human Nature (issued late 1738 but dated this year).
- John Mottley's pseudonymous Joe Miller's Jests, or the Wits Vade-Mecum.
- John and Charles Wesley's Hymns and Sacred Poems, including the first publication of Charles's "Hark! The Herald Angels Sing", anonymously as "Hymn for Christmas-Day", opening "Hark how all the welkin rings".

== Births ==
- 6 January – David Dale, philanthropist (died 1806)
- 26 January – George Spencer, 4th Duke of Marlborough (died 1817)
- 4 February – John Robison, physicist (died 1805)
- 25 March – Prince Edward, Duke of York and Albany (died 1767)
- 16 May – Henry Howard, 12th Earl of Suffolk, peer and politician (died 1779)
- 5 November – Hugh Montgomerie, 12th Earl of Eglinton, peer (died 1819)
- 4 December – Henry Temple, 2nd Viscount Palmerston, politician (died 1802)

== Deaths ==
- 7 April – Dick Turpin, highwayman (hanged) (born 1705)
- 19 April – Nicholas Saunderson, scientist and mathematician (born 1682)
- 10 August – William Craven, 3rd Baron Craven, nobleman. (born 1700)
- 4 September – George Lillo, playwright (born 1693)
- 21 October – William Montagu, 2nd Duke of Manchester (born 1700)

== See also ==
- 1739 in Wales
