= John Edwards (1699–1776) =

Poet and translator from Wales

- Siôn y Potiau
- Born: Glyn Ceiriog, Denbighshire
- Baptised: 27 December 1699
- Died: 1776 (aged 76–77)
- Burial place: Glyn Ceiriog, Denbighshire
- Occupations: weaver; poet; translator
- Era: Early Modern
- Notable work: Translation of Pilgrim's Progress (1767–68)
- Children: Cain; Abel

John Edwards (Welsh: Siôn y Potiau; bapt. 27 December 1699 – 1776) was a Welsh poet, and a translator of Pilgrim's Progress.

== John Edwards ==
Edwards was born in Glyn Ceiriog in Denbighshire in 1699 or earlier. He was a weaver by trade, but is said in early life to have spent seven years as assistant to a bookseller in London, and during that time is supposed to have gained considerable information.

His translation of John Bunyan's Pilgrim's Progress was published in 1767–68.

Edwards had two sons, Cain and Abel. Cain gained some note as a publisher of almanacs, and his father is also thought to have produced almanacs.

John Edwards prepared his own monument, and inscribed thereon 1 Cor. xv. 52, in Latin. He died in 1776 and was buried on 28 December at Glyn Ceiriog.
