= 1787 in Great Britain =

Events from the year 1787 in Great Britain.

== Incumbents ==
- Monarch – George III
- Prime Minister – William Pitt the Younger (Tory)

== Events ==
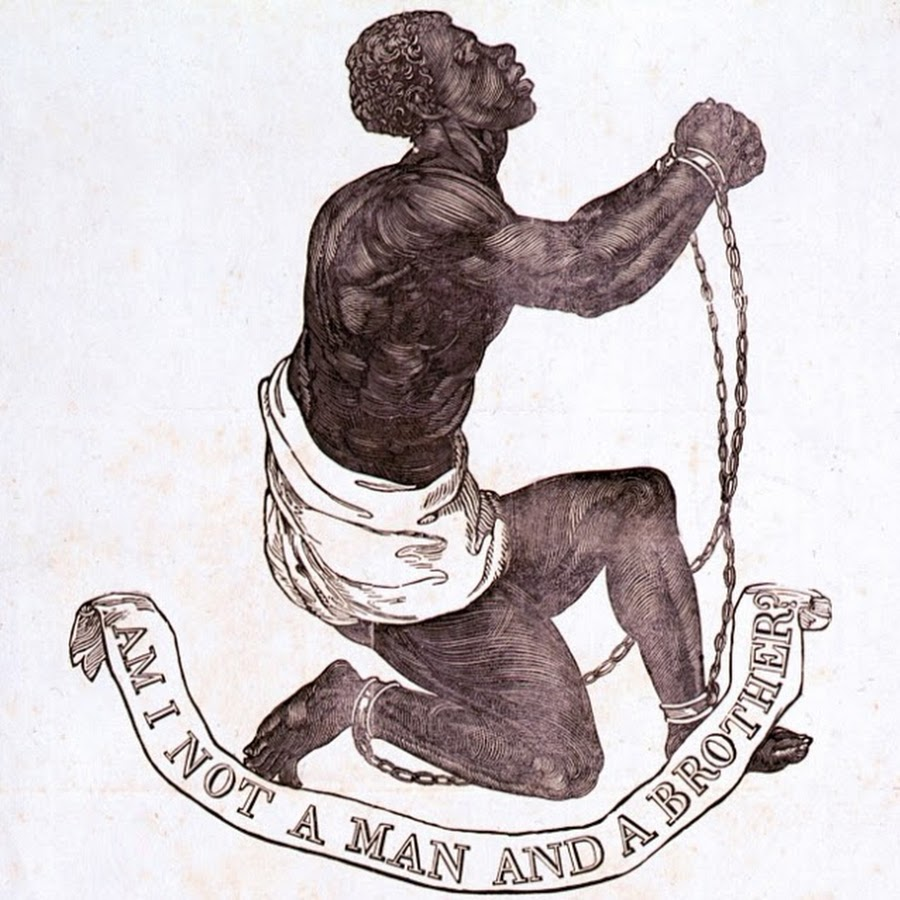
Wedgwood anti-slavery medallion produced for the Society for Effecting the Abolition of the Slave Trade by Wedgwood, 1787

- 1 January – George III writes his first letter to Arthur Young's Annals of Agriculture, under the name of Ralph Robinson of Windsor.
- 11 January – William Herschel discovers the Uranian moons Titania and Oberon.
- 19 February – William Herschel first uses the 40-foot telescope under construction for him at Slough.
- 13 May – Captain Arthur Phillip leaves Portsmouth with the eleven ships of the First Fleet carrying around 700 convicts and at least 300 crew and guards to establish a penal colony in Australia.
- 22 May – Thomas Clarkson and Granville Sharp found the Society for Effecting the Abolition of the Slave Trade with support from John Wesley, Josiah Wedgwood and others.
- 31 May – the original Lord's Cricket Ground holds its first cricket match; Marylebone Cricket Club founded.
- July – Principal Triangulation of Great Britain begun under the direction of General William Roy from Hounslow Heath; in the autumn it is extended to France.
- Summer – Calton weavers' strike in the west of Scotland. On 3 September, six of the Calton weavers are killed by troops.
- 23 December – Captain William Bligh sets sail from Spithead for Tahiti on HMS Bounty.

== Publications ==
- Freed slave Ottobah Cugoano publishes Thoughts and Sentiments on the Evil and Wicked Traffic of the Slavery and Commerce of the Human Species.
- The Scots Musical Museum begins publication.

== Births ==
- 7 January – Patrick Nasmyth, Scottish landscape painter (died 1831)
- 10 February – William Bradley, Britain's tallest ever man (died 1820)
- 17 February – George Mogridge (Old Humphrey), miscellaneous writer and poet (died 1854)
- 10 March – William Etty, painter, especially of nudes (died 1849)
- 28 March – Claudius Rich, archaeologist and anthropologist (died 1821)
- 7 June – William Conybeare, geologist (died 1857)
- 28 June – Sir Harry Smith, military commander (died 1860)
- 24 July – William Ward, cricketer (died 1849)
- 10 September – Justina Jeffreys, Jamaican-born Welsh gentlewoman (died 1869)
- 11 September (bapt.) – Edward Alderson, judge (died 1857)
- 13 September – John Adamson, antiquary and expert on Portuguese (died 1855)
- 13 October – William Brockedon, painter (died 1854)
- 4 November – Edmund Kean, actor (died 1833)
- 21 November – Bryan Procter (Barry Cornwall), poet (died 1874)
- 22 November – Copley Fielding, watercolour landscape painter (died 1855)
- 16 December – Mary Russell Mitford, novelist and dramatist (died 1855)
- Ignatius Bonomi, architect (died 1870)
- John Dobson, architect (died 1865)
- Harriet Gouldsmith, landscape painter and etcher (died 1863)
- Approximate date – Ikey Solomon, receiver of stolen goods (died 1850 in Australia)

== Deaths ==
- 1 April – Floyer Sydenham, classical scholar (born 1710)
- 2 April – Thomas Gage, General (born 1719)
- 10 May – William Watson, physician and scientist (born 1715)
- 25 July – Arthur Devis, portrait painter (born 1712)
- 3 November – Robert Lowth, bishop and grammarian (born 1710)
- 18 December
  - Francis William Drake, British admiral and Governor of Newfoundland (born 1724)
  - Soame Jenyns, English writer (born 1704)

== See also ==
- 1787 in Wales
