= 1709 in Great Britain =

Events from the year 1709 in Great Britain.

== Incumbents ==
- Monarch – Anne

== Events ==
- January to March – unusually cold weather (the Great Frost of 1709) brings floating ice into the North Sea.
- 10 January – Abraham Darby I successfully produces cast iron using coke fuel at his Coalbrookdale blast furnace in Shropshire.
- 1 or 2 February – during his first voyage, Captain Woodes Rogers on the Duke encounters marooned privateer Alexander Selkirk and rescues him after four years living on one of the Juan Fernández Islands, inspiring Defoe's book Robinson Crusoe. After sacking Guayaquil, he and Selkirk will visit the Galapagos Islands.
- 5 February – dramatist John Dennis devises the thundersheet as a new method of producing theatrical thunder for his tragedy Appius and Virginia at the Theatre Royal, Drury Lane, London.
- 12 April – first edition of The Tatler magazine published.
- May – first influx of poor refugee families of German Palatines from the Rhenish Palatinate, mostly Protestants en route to the New World colonies.
- June – The Worcester Post-Man is first published in Worcester; as Berrow's Worcester Journal it will continue to be published as a newspaper more than 300 years later.
- 9 July – Christopher Slaughterford of London is executed in Guildford for the murder of Jane Young, his fiancée. He is the first person in modern England executed for murder based exclusively on circumstantial evidence, and he maintains his innocence to the last.
- 30 July – War of the Spanish Succession: Capture of Tournai by John Churchill, 1st Duke of Marlborough and Prince Eugene of Savoy.
- 31 August (11 September NS) – War of the Spanish Succession: Battle of Malplaquet – troops of the Dutch Republic, Habsburg monarchy, Great Britain and the Kingdom of Prussia led by the Duke of Marlborough drive the French from the field but suffer twice as many casualties. The song "For He's a Jolly Good Fellow" is based on the French song "Marlbrough s'en va-t-en guerre" composed following this battle.
- 9 October – War of the Spanish Succession: British army captures Mons.
- 11 November – Henry Sacheverell preaches an incendiary sermon The Perils of False Brethren at St Paul's Cathedral in the City of London which leads to his impeachment by Parliament.
- 25 December – ten ships leave for the New York Colony from London carrying over 4,000 people.

=== Undated ===
- Enactment of Britain's first copyright law, the Statute of Anne, coming into effect on 10 April 1710.
- The earliest known cricket match involving county teams played is between Kent and Surrey.
- Construction of Marlborough House begins in London.
- The second Eddystone Lighthouse, erected by John Rudyerd, is completed.
- Publication of The Works of Mr William Shakespear edited by dramatist Nicholas Rowe, the first modern edition of Shakespeare's plays, including scene divisions, dramatis personæ and a prefatory account of Shakespeare's life, the first substantial biography of him.
- Publication of Mrs. Delarivier Manley's political satire The New Atalantis.
- Publication of An English-Saxon Homily on the Birth-day of St. Gregory by Ælfric of Eynsham, translated from Old English by Elizabeth Elstob.

== Births ==
- 17 January – George Lyttelton, 1st Baron Lyttelton, politician (died 1773)
- 16 February – Charles Avison, composer (died 1770)
- 24 July – James Harris, politician and grammarian (died 1780)
- 18 September – Samuel Johnson, English writer, critic and lexicographer (died 1784)
- 24 September (bapt.) – John Cleland, English novelist (died 1789)
- 2 November – Anne, Princess Royal and Princess of Orange, Hanoverian-born princess consort and regent of the Netherlands (died 1759)

== Deaths ==
- 24 January – George Rooke, English admiral (born 1650)
- 15 February – John Philips, English poet (born 1676)
- 8 March – William Cowper, surgeon and anatomist (born 1666)
- 9 March – Ralph Montagu, 1st Duke of Montagu, English diplomat (born c. 1638)
- 30 June – Edward Lhuyd, scientist (born 1660)
- 17 July – Robert Bolling, English settler in Virginia (born 1646)
- 9 October – Barbara Palmer, 1st Duchess of Cleveland, English mistress of Charles II of England (born 1640)
- 23 November – William Bentinck, 1st Earl of Portland, favourite of William III (born 1649, Netherlands)

== See also ==
- 1709 in Wales
