= 1715 in Great Britain =

Events from the year 1715 in Great Britain.

== Incumbents ==
- Monarch – George I

== Events ==
- February to March – General election results in victory for the Whigs.
- 27 March – Henry St John, 1st Viscount Bolingbroke flees to France. His part in secret negotiations with France leading to the Treaty of Utrecht has cast suspicion on him in the eyes of the Whig government. He becomes Secretary of State to the Pretender, James Edward Stuart.
- 20 April – Lady Jane Grey, a history play by the Whig writer Nicholas Rowe is performed at the Drury Lane Theatre.
- 3 May – A total solar eclipse is seen across southern England and Scandinavia, the last total eclipse visible in London for almost 900 years.
- 10 June
  - Impeachment of Robert Harley, Earl of Oxford. The Tory former chief minister is indicted for High Treason and other crimes.
  - Bolingbroke is also impeached by Parliament.
  - A Jacobite mob sacks Cross Street Chapel in Manchester, going on to destroy another at Monton.
- 12 July – Habeas Corpus Act suspended due to fear of an imminent Jacobite rebellion.
- 16 July – Imprisonment of Robert Harley, Earl of Oxford, in the Tower of London for his part in the negotiations over the Treaty of Utrecht.
- 1 August
  - The Riot Act comes into force.
  - First Doggett's Coat and Badge rowing race held on the River Thames.
  - Nicholas Rowe is appointed as Poet Laureate, replacing the Irish-born Nahum Tate. The Whig Rowe has written works supportive of the Hanoverian Succession. He holds the post until his death in 1718.
- 20 August – The Duke of Ormonde who has fled to join the Jacobites is attainted and his estates confiscated.
- 31 August – Opening of Old Dock, Liverpool, the world's first enclosed commercial wet dock (Thomas Steers, engineer).
- September (presumed) – Staging of first Three Choirs Festival.
- 6 September – First of the major Jacobite risings in Scotland against the rule of King George I: The Earl of Mar raises the standard of James Edward Stuart and marches on Edinburgh.
- 9 November – The Battle of Preston begins, with Jacobite forces under Thomas Forster surrounded by government troops under Charles Wills.
- 13 November – Battle of Sheriffmuir is fought between Jacobites and the Duke of Argyll's army. Although the action is inconclusive, Argyll halts the Jacobite advance.
- 14 November – Battle of Preston. Government forces defeat a Jacobite incursion at the conclusion of a five-day siege and action, the last battle fought on English soil.
- 15 November – Third Barrier Treaty signed by Britain, the Holy Roman Empire and the Dutch Republic.
- 22 December – James Edward Stuart joins Jacobite rebels at Peterhead but fails to rouse his army.

== Publications ==
- Colen Campbell begins publication of his pattern book Vitruvius Britannicus, or the British Architect.
- Elizabeth Elstob publishes the first grammar of Old English, The Rudiments of Grammar for the English-Saxon Tongue, first given in English; with an apology for the study of northern antiquities.

== Births ==
- 4 February — John Hamilton, Member of Parliament for Wigtown Burghs and Wigtownshire (died 1796)
- 3 April – William Watson, physician and scientist (died 1787)
- 19 April – James Nares, composer (died 1783)
- 4 May – Richard Graves, writer (died 1804)
- 5 November – John Brown, writer (died 1766)

== Deaths ==
- March – William Dampier, buccaneer, sea captain, author and scientific observer (born 1651)
- 17 March – Gilbert Burnet, Bishop of Salisbury, historian and philosopher (born 1643 in Scotland)
- 19 May – Charles Montagu, 1st Earl of Halifax, Chancellor of the Exchequer (born 1661)
- 14 October – Thomas Tenison, Archbishop of Canterbury (born 1636)
- 15 October – Humphry Ditton, mathematician (born 1675)
- 15 December – George Hickes, clergyman and scholar (born 1642)
- 28 December – William Carstares, clergyman (born 1649)
- Joan Dant, Quaker merchant and philanthropist (born 1631)
- Elizabeth Haselwood, silversmith (born c. 1644)

== See also ==
- 1715 in Wales
