= David Maurice =

Welsh Anglican priest and translator

David Maurice (1626–1702), also known as Dafydd Morris or Dafydd ap Morus, was a Welsh Anglican priest and translator.

== Life ==
Maurice, the son of Andrew Morris, the Dean of St Asaph in north Wales, was educated at Jesus College, Oxford and New College, Oxford. After his ordination, he obtained various church positions in Wales, including becoming a canon of St Asaph in 1666. At the time of his death in 1702, he was vicar of Abergele, Betws-yn-Rhos and Llanarmon-yn-Iâl. He translated into Welsh and published two works written by Theophilus Dorrington, as well as a The Promised Reed; a sermon preach'd … for the support of weak Christians (1700).
