= Joshua Andrews =

Welsh Baptist minister (c.1708–1793)

Joshua Andrews (1708? – 1793) was a Welsh Baptist minister. Following studies at Bristol Academy he served as a lay preacher at Pen-y-garn. He was ordained c.1740, assisting Miles Harry with special charge of the cause at Usk for a short time before relocating to Llanwenarth. In 1745 he was appointed minister of Olchon, and of Capel-y-ffin (twenty miles from Olchon), where he remained until his death following a long illness, in 1793.
