= 1711 in Great Britain =

Events from the year 1711 in Great Britain.

== Incumbents ==
- Monarch – Anne

== Events ==
- 24 February – premiere of Rinaldo by George Frideric Handel, the first Italian opera written for the London stage, at the Queen's Theatre, Haymarket.
- 1 March – first edition of the magazine The Spectator published in London, edited by Joseph Addison and Richard Steele.
- 5 April (Easter Sunday) – the central tower of Elgin Cathedral in northeast Scotland collapses.
- 22 May – Company of Blanket Weavers of Witney in Oxfordshire incorporated by royal charter to regulate the trade.
- 23 May – Robert Harley made Earl of Oxford.
- 29 May – Harley made Lord High Treasurer.
- 7 August – capture of the galleon San Joaquin: Spanish galleon San Joaquin in a treasure fleet sailing from Cartagena de Indias (modern-day Colombia) to Spain surrenders after an engagement with five British ships.
- 11 August – the first race meeting is held at Ascot Racecourse, "Her Majesty's Plate", attended by Queen Anne.
- 22 August – the Quebec Expedition, a British attempt to attack the city of Quebec as part of Queen Anne's War, fails when 8 of its ships are wrecked in the Saint Lawrence River and 850 soldiers drown, one of the worst disasters in British history up to this date.
- 8 September – the South Sea Company receives a Royal Charter.
- 12 September – Siege of Bouchain in the War of the Spanish Succession concludes with the last major victory for John Churchill, 1st Duke of Marlborough.
- 14 October – Woodes Rogers returns to England after a successful round-the-world privateering cruise against Spain, carrying loot worth £150,000.
- 5 November – the southwest spire of Southwell Minster in Nottinghamshire is struck by lightning, resulting in a fire that spreads to the nave and tower, destroying roofs, bells, clock and organ.
- 7 December - The Earl of Nottingham successfully proposes an amendment in the House of Lords calling for "No Peace Without Spain".
- 15 December – Occasional Conformity Act, intending to bar nonconformists and Roman Catholics from public office.
- 25 December – the rebuilding of St Paul's Cathedral in London to a design by Sir Christopher Wren is declared complete by Parliament; Old St Paul's had been destroyed by the 1666 Great Fire of London.
- 31 December – John Churchill, 1st Duke of Marlborough is replaced by James Butler, 2nd Duke of Ormonde as the Commander-in-Chief of the Forces.

=== Undated ===
- Commission for Building Fifty New Churches set up under terms of the New Churches in London and Westminster Act 1710 (9 Ann. c. 17).
- John Shore invents the tuning fork.
- Blast furnace for the production of charcoal iron erected at Backbarrow in the north west of England; it will be in production until the 1960s.

== Publications ==
=== Prose ===
- Francis Atterbury, Representation of the State of Religion
- Anthony Ashley-Cooper, 3rd Earl of Shaftesbury, Characteristics of Men, Manners, Opinions, Times
- Daniel Defoe
  - The British Visions
  - An Essay on the History of Parties
  - An Essay on the South-Sea Trade
  - The Present State of the Parties in Great Britain (attributed)
  - The Secret History of the October Club
- John Dennis, Reflections Critical and Satyrical, Upon a Late Rhapsody call'd, An Essay upon Criticism (Dennis's counterattack on Alexander Pope)

=== Poetry and Songs ===
- Sir Richard Blackmore, published anonymously, The Nature of Man
- William King, An Historical Account of the Heathen Gods and Heroes
- Alexander Pope, An Essay on Criticism
- James Watson, editor, Choice Collection of Comic and Serious Scots Poems, Edinburgh

== Births ==
- 7 May – David Hume, philosopher (died 1776)
- 19 August – Edward Boscawen, admiral (died 1761)
- 1 September – William Boyce, composer (died 1779)
- 22 September – Thomas Wright, astronomer, mathematician, instrument maker, architect, garden designer, antiquary and genealogist (died 1786)
- 26 September – Richard Grenville-Temple, 2nd Earl Temple, politician (died 1779)
- 5 November – Catherine Raftor, later Kitty Clive, actress (died 1785)

== Deaths ==
- 19 March – Thomas Ken, bishop and hymn-writer (born 1637)
- 2 May – Laurence Hyde, 1st Earl of Rochester, statesman (born 1641)
- 6 July – James Douglas, 2nd Duke of Queensberry, politician (born 1662)
- 25 August – Edward Villiers, 1st Earl of Jersey, politician (born c. 1656)

== See also ==
- 1711 in Wales
