= 1773 in Great Britain =

This is a list of events from the year 1773 in Great Britain.

== Incumbents ==
- Monarch – George III
- Prime Minister – Frederick North, Lord North (Tory)

== Events ==
- 1 January – the words of the hymn "Amazing Grace" (written by the curate John Newton) are probably first used in a prayer meeting at Olney, Buckinghamshire.
- 17 January – second voyage of James Cook: Captain Cook in HMS Resolution (1771) becomes the first European explorer to cross the Antarctic Circle.
- March – The General Turnpike Act 1773 (13 Geo. 3. c. 84) regulates the system of road tolls.
- 15 March – first performance of Oliver Goldsmith's comedy She Stoops to Conquer at the Covent Garden Theatre in London.
- 27 April – Parliament passes the Tea Act 1773 (13 Geo. 3. c. 44), designed to save the British East India Company by granting it a monopoly on the North American tea trade.
- 10 May – Tea Act 1773 comes into force.
- 27 May
  - Parliament passes the Plate Assay (Sheffield and Birmingham) Act 1772 (13 Geo. 3. c. 52) permitting assay offices in Birmingham and Sheffield.
  - Major landslip at Buildwas in the valley of the River Severn.
- May – England and Wales Precipitation totals 151.8 millimetres or 5.98 inches, the wettest May on record and the solitary still-standing record wet month from the eighteenth century.
- 4 June – 1773 Phipps expedition towards the North Pole sets out from the Nore.
- 21 June – Parliament passes the Regulating Act 1773 (13 Geo. 3. c. 63) creating the office of governor general, with an advising council, to exercise political authority over the territory under British East India Company rule in India.
- June – John Harrison receives the Longitude prize for his invention of the first marine chronometer.
- 1 July – Parliament passes the Inclosure Act 1773 (13 Geo. 3. c. 81).
- 16 December – a group of American colonists, dressed as Mohawk Indians, steal aboard ships of the East India Company and dump their cargo of tea into Boston Harbor in a protest against British tax policies that became known as the Boston Tea Party.

=== Undated ===
- An informal Stock Exchange opens at Threadneedle Street in London.
- First London catering establishment to offer curry, Norrish Street Coffee House.
- Penny Post introduced in Edinburgh.

== Publications ==
- Scottish judge James Burnett, Lord Monboddo, begins publication of Of the Origin and Progress of Language, a contribution to evolutionary ideas of the Enlightenment.
- Hester Chapone publishes the conduct book for young women Letters on the Improvement of the Mind.
- The Jockey Club's first Race calendar, edited by James Weatherby.

== Births ==
- 14 January – William Amherst, 1st Earl Amherst, ambassador to China and Governor-General of India (died 1857)
- 27 January – Prince Augustus Frederick, Duke of Sussex (died 1843)
- 6 April – James Mill, historian, economist, political theorist and philosopher (died 1836)
- 19 May – Arthur Aikin, chemist and mineralogist (died 1854)
- 13 June – Thomas Young, physicist (died 1829)
- 23 July – Thomas Brisbane, Scottish astronomer and Governor of New South Wales (died 1860)
- 23 October – Francis Jeffrey, Lord Jeffrey, judge and literary critic (died 1850)
- 28 October – Simon Goodrich, mechanical engineer (died 1847)
- 6 November – Henry Hunt, politician (died 1835)
- 21 December – Robert Brown, botanist (died 1858)
- 27 December – George Cayley, aviation pioneer (died 1857)

== Deaths ==
- 9 February – John Gregory, physician, medical writer and moralist (born 1724)
- 24 March – Philip Dormer Stanhope, 4th Earl of Chesterfield, statesman and man of letters (born 1694)
- 15 May – Alban Butler, Catholic priest and writer (born 1710)
- 23 July – George Edwards, naturalist (born 1693)
- 24 August – George Lyttelton, 1st Baron Lyttelton, politician (born 1709)
- 7 November – Andrew Brice, printer and writer (born 1690)
- 15 November – Bernard Gates, composer (born 1686)
- 16 November – John Hawkesworth, writer (born c. 1715)
- 20 November – Charles Jennens, landowner (born c. 1700)

== See also ==
- 1773 in Wales
