= 1702 in England =

- Centuries: 16th; 17th; 18th; 19th; 20th
- Decades: 1680s; 1690s; 1700s; 1710s; 1720s
- See also: Other events of 1702

Events from the year 1702 in England. This year sees a change of monarch.

== Incumbents ==
- Monarch – William III (until 8 March), Anne (starting 8 March)

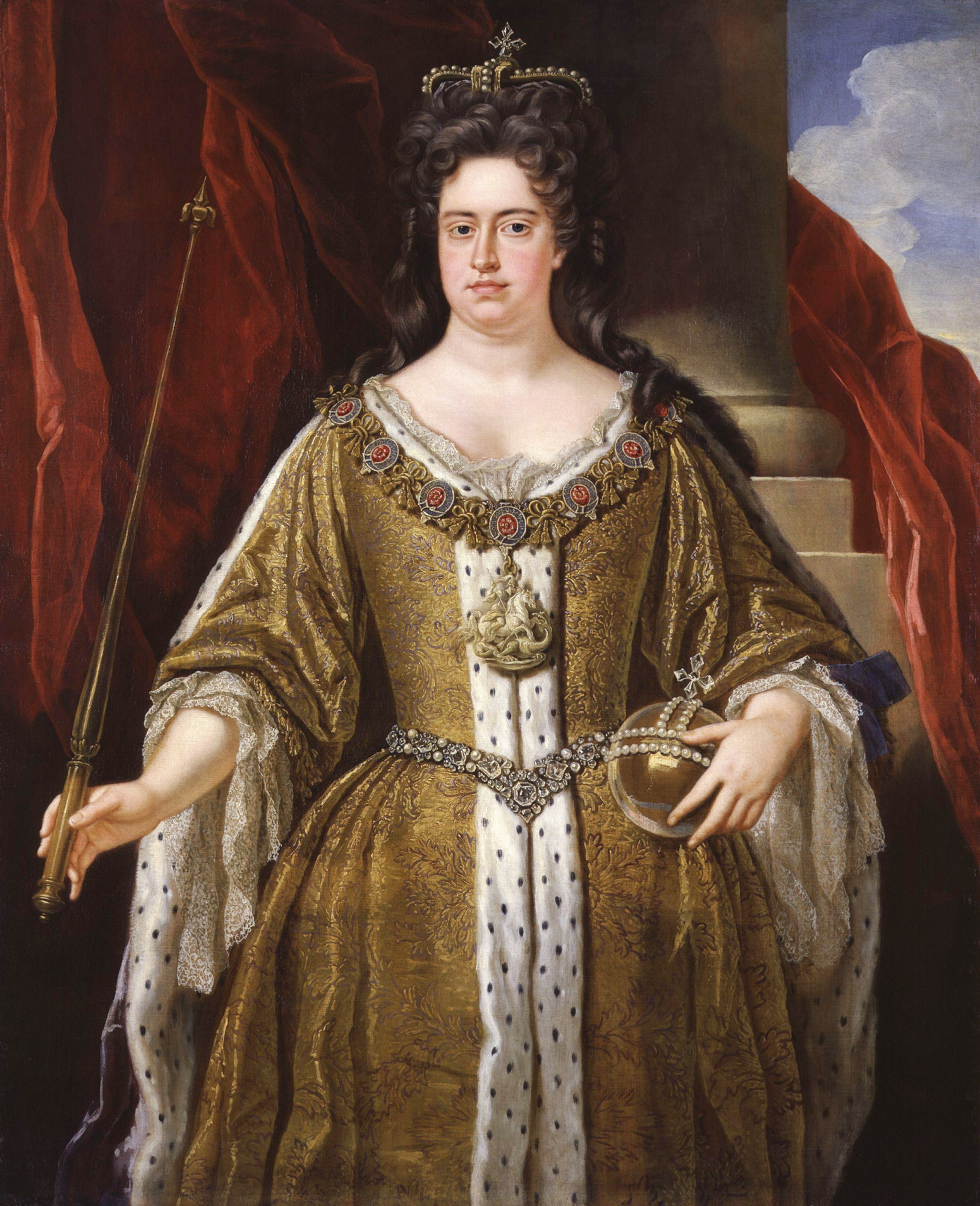
Queen Anne c.1702

== Events ==
- 20 February – William III falls from his horse, Sorrel, in Richmond Park after it stumbles on a molehill and breaks his clavicle.
- 8 March (19 March N.S.) – William III dies at Kensington Palace of complications following his accident; his sister-in-law Anne Stuart, Princess of Denmark, becomes Queen Anne of England.
- 11 March (22 March N.S.) – the first regular English language national newspaper, The Daily Courant, is published for the first time in Fleet Street in the City of London, initially by Elizabeth Mallet; it covers only foreign news.
- 23 April – coronation of Queen Anne in Westminster Abbey.
- 4 May (14 May N.S.) – War of the Spanish Succession: England, the Dutch Republic and the Holy Roman Empire declare war on France as part of the Grand Alliance.
- 8 May – Lord Godolphin becomes Lord High Treasurer at the urging of his friend and political ally John Churchill, Earl of Marlborough, establishing the Godolphin–Marlborough ministry which will remain in power until 1710.
- June – War of the Spanish Succession: Queen Anne's Captain-General Marlborough forces the surrender of Kaiserswerth on the Rhine.
- July – 1702 English general election results in victory for the Tories.
- September – War of the Spanish Succession: Churchill forces the surrender of Venlo on the River Meuse.
- 12 October (23 October N.S.) – War of the Spanish Succession:
  - Battle of Vigo Bay – Anglo-Dutch naval forces under English Admiral Sir George Rooke capture the defended Spanish port of Cádiz and take or destroy all the Spanish treasure fleet and escorting French warships there; this follows a failed attempt in August/September to capture it in an amphibious operation, the Battle of Cádiz.
  - Churchill forces the surrender of Liège.
- 27 October – Queen Anne's War: English troops plunder St. Augustine in Florida.
- December – Daniel Defoe publishes his satiric pamphlet The Shortest Way with the Dissenters (anonymously).
- 14 December – John Churchill is created Duke of Marlborough.

=== Undated ===
- Castle Howard in Yorkshire is completed to the design of John Vanbrugh and Nicholas Hawksmoor.
- Ripon Obelisk designed by Nicholas Hawksmoor, triggering a fashion for obelisks in Britain.
- George Sorocold erects machinery at Cotchetts' silk spinning mill in Derby, making it one of the earliest examples of a factory.
- Richard Bentley at Cambridge introduces the first written (as opposed to oral) competitive examinations in a Western university.
- John Kersey publishes A New English Dictionary; or, a complete collection of the most proper and significant words, commonly used in the language.

== Births ==
- 4 March – Jack Sheppard, burglar and escapee (died 1724)
- 26 June – Philip Doddridge, religious leader (died 1751)
- 5 November – Edward Stone, polymath (died 1768)
- Undated – Benjamin Stillingfleet, botanist (died 1771)

== Deaths ==
- 8 March – King William III (born 1650 in The Hague, Netherlands)
- 23 April – Margaret Fell, Quaker leader (born 1614)
- 28 September – Robert Spencer, 2nd Earl of Sunderland, statesman (born 1640)
- 15 October – Frances Stewart, Duchess of Richmond, courtier (born 1647)
- 4 November – John Benbow, admiral (born 1653)
