= 1703 in England =

- Centuries: 16th; 17th; 18th; 19th; 20th
- Decades: 1680s; 1690s; 1700s; 1710s; 1720s
- See also: Other events of 1703

Events from the year 1703 in England.

== Incumbents ==
- Monarch – Anne

== Events ==
- 1 January – the case of Ashby v White is decided in the Court of Queen's Bench. Concerning the right to vote, it is a leading case in the Constitution of England and English tort law, establishing the principle for every wrong there is a remedy.
- 1 March – the Recruiting Act 1703 goes into effect, providing for the forcible enlistment of able-bodied but unemployed men into the Army and Royal Navy in order to fight in Queen Anne's War in North America. The Act expires at the end of February 1704.
- 15 March – the landmark case of Rose v Royal College of Physicians is decided in the Court of Queen's Bench, beginning the end of the monopoly that the Royal College of Physicians has over the practice of medicine.
- 18 May – War of the Spanish Succession: The Duke of Marlborough captures the cities of Cologne, Bonn, Limbourg, Huy and Guelders.
- 29–31 July – Daniel Defoe is placed in a pillory (at Temple Bar, London) as part of his punishment for the crime of seditious libel after publishing his politically satirical pamphlet The Shortest Way with the Dissenters (1702) (he is released from Newgate Prison in mid-November).
- 23 October – Hannah Twynnoy, a 33-year-old barmaid in Malmesbury, Wiltshire, becomes the first person to be killed in Great Britain by a tiger. While working at the White Lion Inn, where a group of wild animals is on exhibit, she is mauled after bothering the tiger.
- 26–29 November (7–10 December N.S.) – the Great Storm of 1703, an Atlantic hurricane ravages southern England and the English Channel, killing at least 8,000, chiefly at sea.
  - 27 November
    - Royal Navy ships wrecked on the Goodwin Sands include
      - HMS Restoration with loss of all 387 on board.
      - HMS Northumberland with loss of all 220 on board.
      - HMS Mary with loss of all but one of the 270 onboard including Rear admiral Basil Beaumont.
      - HMS Stirling Castle with loss of 206.
    - The Eddystone Lighthouse near Plymouth is destroyed in the storm together with its designer Henry Winstanley and 5 others.
- 30 November – Isaac Newton is elected president of the Royal Society in London, a position he will hold until his death in 1727.
- 27 December – Portugal and England sign the Methuen Treaty which gives preference to Portuguese imported wines over French wines into England, while Portugal will import woollen goods from England. This leads to the increasing popularity of Port wine in Britain.

=== Undated ===
- The case of Coggs v Bernard is decided in the Court of King's Bench. Concerning the duties of a bailee, it is a landmark case in English contract law and property law.
- Imposter George Psalmanazar arrives in London.

== Births ==
- 17 June – John Wesley, founder of Methodism (died 1791)
- 26 November – Theophilus Cibber, actor and writer (died 1758)

== Deaths ==
- 18 February – Thomas Hyde, orientalist (born 1636)
- 3 March – Robert Hooke, scientist (born 1635)
- 18 April – Denis Granville, exiled nonjuring clergyman (born 1637)
- 20 April – Lancelot Addison, royal chaplain (born 1632)
- 26 May – Samuel Pepys, civil servant and diarist (born 1633)
- 9 September – Charles de Saint-Évremond, exiled French essayist (born 1613)
- 24 October – William Burkitt, biblical expositor, vicar in Dedham (born 1650)
- 28 October – John Wallis, mathematician (born 1616)
