= 1774 in Great Britain =

1774 political cartoon depicting the dissolution of parliament

Events from the year 1774 in Great Britain.

== Incumbents ==
- Monarch – George III
- Prime Minister – Frederick North, Lord North (Tory)

== Events ==
- 27 January – John Wilkinson patents a method for boring cannon from the solid, subsequently utilised for accurate boring of steam engine cylinders.
- 19 February – Calico Acts repealed, leading to the development and mechanisation of the British cotton industry.
- 22 February – the legal case of Donaldson v Beckett is decided in the House of Lords, denying the continued existence of a perpetual common law copyright and holding that copyright is a creation of statute and can be limited in its duration. This does permit authors to claim copyright in their own works.
- 31 March – American Revolutionary War: Britain orders the port of Boston, Massachusetts closed in the Boston Port Act.
- 17 April – the first avowedly Unitarian congregation, Essex Street Chapel in London, is founded by Theophilus Lindsey.
- 20 April – Life Assurance Act stipulates that people taking out life assurance must have an interest in the life of the insured person, with the intention of eliminating the use of policies as a form of gambling.
- 2 May – the Society of Antiquaries of London open the coffin of King Edward I and discover that his body has been perfectly preserved for 467 years.
- 19 May – Shakers Ann Lee and eight followers sail from Liverpool for colonial America.
- 2 June – Intolerable Acts: The Quartering Act, requiring American colonists to let British soldiers into their homes, is re-enacted.
- 22 June – Quebec Act passed setting out rules of governance for the colony of Quebec in British North America.
- 1 August – Joseph Priestley, working independently at Bowood House, Wiltshire, isolates oxygen in the form of a gas.
- 4 October – a highwayman robs Prime Minister Lord North near Chiswick.
- 5 October–10 November – 1774 British general election. Lord North continues as prime minister. (In Westminster, Ignatius Sancho becomes the first person of African origin eligible to vote in Britain.)

=== Undated ===
- The Royal Crescent, Bath, designed by John Wood the Younger, is completed.
- A revision of the laws of cricket introduces a leg before wicket rule.

== Publications ==
- Luke Hansard begins printing the transcripts of parliamentary debates.
- Methodist founder John Wesley's pamphlet Thoughts Upon Slavery arguing against the slave trade.

== Births ==
- 29 January – Olinthus Gregory, mathematician (died 1841)
- 24 February – Prince Adolphus, Duke of Cambridge (died 1850)
- 16 March – Captain Matthew Flinders, explorer (died 1814)
- 12 August – Robert Southey, poet and biographer (died 1843)
- Edward Baines, newspaper proprietor and politician (died 1848)
- Arthur Thistlewood, conspirator (executed 1820)
- Highflyer, racehorse (died 1793)

== Deaths ==
- 1 July – Henry Fox, 1st Baron Holland, statesman (born 1705)
- 14 July – James O'Hara, 2nd Baron Tyrawley, field marshal (born 1682)
- 22 November – Robert Clive, 1st Baron Clive, general and statesman (suicide, born 1725)
- 25 November – Henry Baker, naturalist (born 1698)

== See also ==
- 1774 in Wales
