= Thomas Baddy =

Thomas Baddy (died 1729) was an Independent minister and author.

== Early life and education ==
Little is known about his family and early life, but he had a brother, Owen. He was described as being from Wrexham in 1690. He studied in Rathmell, Yorkshire at Frankland's Academy beginning in 1689, and then at the Common Fund Board until 1693.

== Career ==
He was a minister in Denbigh of the Independent congregation from 1693 until his death. During that time, he also filled in as needed at the Bala and Wrexham churches. Baddy was an author, translator, and wrote hymns, considered "the earliest known attempts at hymnody among Welsh Dissenters." A series was published in 1703 and Caniad Salomon was published in 1725. He translated Christian's Passover (Pasc y Cristion) and A Work by T. Wadswoth (1713) into Welsh.

== Personal life ==
Baddy, who was well-off financially, married Anne Salusbury of Galltfaenan, Denbighshire and they had a daughter who married a man with the surname Pugh and another who married Rev. James Jardine, who was also an Independent minister in Denbigh. He died in June 1729.
