= 1707 in Great Britain =

Events from the year 1707 in Great Britain, created on 1 May this year as a consequence of the 1706 Treaty of Union and its ratification by the 1707 Acts of Union.

== Incumbents ==
- Monarch – Anne

== Events ==
- 12 May (1 May Old Style) – The new sovereign state of Great Britain comes into being as a result of the Acts of Union which ratified the Treaty of Union: the kingdoms of England and Scotland are combined into a single, United Kingdom and merge the Parliaments of England and Scotland to form the Parliament of Great Britain. The Equivalent, a sum of £398,000, is paid to Scotland by the English government due to Scotland now taking on shared responsibility for England’s national debt.
- 8 July – "Hot Tuesday" – estimated temperature in England 38°C.
- 29 July–21 August – War of the Spanish Succession: Battle of Toulon – Allies, including British forces under Admiral Sir Cloudesley Shovell, are obliged to withdraw, but the French fleet is effectively put out of action.
- 22 October – Scilly naval disaster: Four Royal Navy ships, including HMS Association, run aground in the Isles of Scilly because of faulty navigation – Admiral Sir Cloudesley Shovell and at least 1450 sailors are drowned.
- 23 October – first sitting of the Parliament of Great Britain, at Westminster.
- 5 December – first meeting of the Society of Antiquaries takes place in the Bear Tavern on The Strand, London.

=== Undated ===
- A new Succession to the Crown Act requires the senior officers of state to proclaim the next protestant heir as successor to the British throne on the death of Queen Anne, on pain of treason; and provides for the continuance of Parliament on the monarch’s death.
- Establishment of Warminster School in Wiltshire as Lord Weymouth's Grammar School.
- Establishment of the Fortnum & Mason department store in London.

== Books ==
- Anonymous, Memoirs of the Court of England (translation)
- Anonymous, The History of the Earl of Warwick; Sirnam'd the King-maker (transl.)
- Richard Baxter, The Poetical Works of the Late Richard Baxter
- Thomas Brown, The Works of Mr. Thomas Brown
- Anthony Collins, Essay Concerning the Use of Reason
- Thomas D'Urfey, Stories, Moral and Comical
- Laurence Echard, The History of England vol. 1
- Edward Lhuyd, Archaeologia Britannica: an Account of the Languages, Histories and Customs of Great Britain, from Travels through Wales, Cornwall, Bas-Bretagne, Ireland and Scotland, vol. 1, Glossography
- Delarivière Manley, The Lady's Pacquet of Letters (fiction)
- Isaac Newton, Arithmetica Universalis
- Jonathan Swift, A Critical Essay upon the Faculties of the Mind
- Matthew Tindal, A Defence of the Rights of the Christian Church (seq. to 1706 work)
- John Toland, A Philippick Oration to Incite the English Against the French (translated from a work by Matthaus Schiner)
- Catherine Trotter, A Discourse Concerning a Guide in Controversies
- Isaac Watts, Hymns and Spiritual Songs (frequently reprinted hereafter)
- John Wilmot, Earl of Rochester, The Miscellaneous Works of the Late Earls of Rochester and Roscommon

== Periodicals ==
- John Oldmixon, The Muses Mercury; or, The Monthly Miscellany, published monthly from January of this year to January 1708

== Poetry and songs ==
- Samuel Cobb, Poems on Several Occasions
- Nahum Tate, The Triumph of Union
- Isaac Watts, Hymns and Spiritual Songs, the first of many editions throughout the 18th century and afterward; includes "O God, Our Help in Ages Past"
- John Wilmot, Earl of Rochester, The Miscellaneous Works of the Right Honourable the Late Earls of Rochester And Roscommon. With The Memoirs of the Life and Character of the late Earl of Rochester, in a Letter to the Dutchess of Mazarine. By Mons. St. Evremont, London: Printed & sold by B. Bragge; second edition in the same year, London: Printed for Edmund Curll (third edition, 1709)

== Drama ==
- Joseph Addison, Rosamond (opera)
- Susanna Centlivre, The Platonick Lady
- Colley Cibber
  - The Double Gallant
  - The Lady's Last Stake
- George Farquhar, The Beaux' Stratagem
- Peter Anthony Motteux, Thomyris, Queen of Scythia (opera)
- Nicholas Rowe, The Royal Convert
- Nahum Tate, Injur'd Love, adaptation of Webster's The White Devil

== Births (from 1 May) ==
- 24 August – Selina Hastings, Methodist leader (died 1791)
- September – Nathan Alcock, physician (died 1779)
- 5 September – John Forbes, general (died 1759)
- 18 December – Charles Wesley, Methodist leader, brother of John Wesley (died 1788)
- probable – William Hoare, portrait painter, noted for his pastels (died 1792)

== Deaths (from 1 May) ==
- 17 June – Antonio Verrio, painter (born 1639 in Italy)
- 23 June – John Mill, theologian (born c. 1645)
- 18 August – William Cavendish, 1st Duke of Devonshire, soldier and statesman (born 1640)
- 15 September – George Stepney, poet and diplomat (born 1663)
- 23 September – John Tutchin, radical Whig controversialist, gadfly journalist and poet (born c. 1661)
- 22 October – Sir Cloudesley Shovell, admiral, drowned (born 1650)
- 1 December – Jeremiah Clarke, composer and organist, suicide (born 1674)
- probable – Henry Playford, music publisher (born 1657)
