= 1706 in England =

- Centuries: 16th; 17th; 18th; 19th; 20th
- Decades: 1680s; 1690s; 1700s; 1710s; 1720s
- See also: Other events of 1706

Events from the year 1706 in England.

== Incumbents ==
- Monarch – Anne

== Events ==
- February – Regency Act (backdated to 1705) requires the senior officers of state to proclaim the next Protestant heir (at this time, Sophia of Hanover) as successor to the English throne on the death of Queen Anne.
- 8 April – George Farquhar's play The Recruiting Officer first performed at the Theatre Royal, Drury Lane.
- 11 May – War of the Spanish Succession: British troops relieve Barcelona from a French siege.
- 23 May – War of the Spanish Succession: English troops led by John Churchill, 1st Duke of Marlborough together with Dutch and German troops defeat the French at the Battle of Ramillies.
- 22 July – Treaty of Union provides for England and Scotland to be merged into the Kingdom of Great Britain in 1707.
- 21 August – War of the Spanish Succession: Franco-Spanish assault on the British colony at Charleston, South Carolina repelled.
- October
  - Opening of the Twinings tea shop in London, still open as of the 21st century.
  - The predecessors of food manufacturers Crosse & Blackwell set up business in London.
- undated
  - Literacy test for Benefit of clergy abolished, making the benefit available to all first-time offenders of lesser felonies.
  - The first turnpike trust is established by Act of Parliament, which appoints 32 independent local trustees to oversee the maintenance and management of the road between Fonthill in Bedfordshire and Stony Stratford in Buckinghamshire.
  - Isaac Watts' verses Horae Lyricae published.

== Births ==
- 10 February – Benjamin Hoadly, physician and dramatist (died 1757)
- 6 March – George Pocock, admiral (died 1792)
- 10 June – John Dollond, optician (died 1761)

== Deaths ==
- 29 January – Charles Sackville, 6th Earl of Dorset, poet and courtier (born 1638)
- 27 February – John Evelyn, writer, gardener and diarist (born 1620)
- Byerley Turk, thoroughbred stallion (born c. 1684)
