= The Equivalent =

Payments to Scotland by the English government

Equivalent Act 1713
- Act of Parliament
- Parliament of Great Britain
- Long title: An Act to discharge and acquit the Commissioners of Equivalent, for the Sum of Three Hundred Eighty-one Thousand Five Hundred and Nine Pounds, Fifteen Shillings, Ten Pence Half-penny, by them duly issued, out of the Sum of Three Hundred Ninety-eight Thousand Eighty-five Pounds, Ten Shillings, which they received.
- Citation: 12 Ann. c. 12 (Note: This is the citation in The Statutes of the Realm.); 12 Ann. St. 2. c. 13 (Note: This is the citation in The Statutes at Large.)
- Territorial extent: Great Britain

Dates
- Royal assent: 9 July 1714
- Commencement: 16 February 1714 (Note: Start of session.)
- Repealed: 15 July 1867
Other legislation
Repealed by	Statute Law Revision Act 1867
Relates to	Equivalent Act 1714; Equivalent Act 1716

Status: Repealed

Text of statute as originally enacted

The Equivalent was a sum negotiated at £398,085 10s. 0d. (equivalent to £82,651,661 in 2025) paid to Scotland by the English Government under the terms of the Acts of Union 1707. Proposals for it first emerged in the course of abortive Union negotiations in 1702 to 1703.

The Equivalent's purposes were ostensibly to take account of the contribution that Scots taxpayers would then make towards servicing the English national debt and as transitional mitigation of the effects of higher taxes on the Scottish economy. Though attempts have been made to see it as a precise calculation, it is now generally regarded as part of a political bargain designed for other purposes as well, such as the costs of winding up the Company of Scotland which had undertaken the Darien scheme. Shareholders in and creditors of the company were to receive 58.6% of The Equivalent. It was also suggested that payments found their way to members of the Scottish Parliament who voted for its abolition.

The fund was ultimately overseen in 1728 by Patrick Campbell, Lord Monzie, a Scottish judge.
