= 1781 in Great Britain =

Events from the year 1781 in Great Britain.

== Incumbents ==
- Monarch – George III
- Prime Minister – Frederick North, Lord North (Tory)

== Events ==
- 1 January – Industrial Revolution: The Iron Bridge opens across the River Severn.
- 5 January – American Revolutionary War: Richmond, Virginia, is burned by British naval forces led by Benedict Arnold.
- 6 January – Battle of Jersey: British troops prevent the French from occupying Jersey in the Channel Islands.
- 17 January – American Revolutionary War: the American Continental Army under Daniel Morgan decisively defeats British forces at the Battle of Cowpens in South Carolina.
- January – William Pitt the Younger, later Prime Minister, enters Parliament, aged 21.
- 3 February – American Revolutionary War and Fourth Anglo-Dutch War: The Dutch Caribbean island of Sint Eustatius (which has been supplying the United States) surrenders to Admiral Rodney.

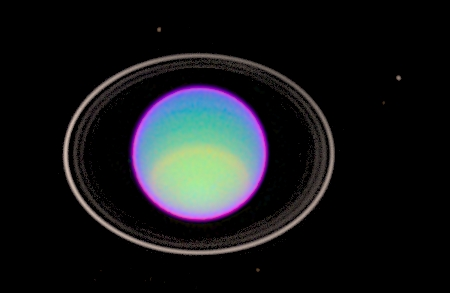
13 March: Uranus discovered [image in false colour].

- 28 February – foundation of the Literary and Philosophical Society of Manchester.
- 13 March – Sir William Herschel discovers the planet Uranus. Originally he calls it Georgium Sidus (George's Star) in honour of King George III.
- 15 March – American Revolutionary War: American General Nathanael Greene loses the Battle of Guilford Court House to British.
- 1 July – Second Anglo-Mysore War: at the Battle of Porto Novo, the British defeat the Mysore ruler Hyder Ali.
- 6 July – American Revolutionary War: At the Battle of Green Spring, the British led by Lord Cornwallis defeat the French led by the Marquis de Lafayette.
- 27 July – French spy François Henri de la Motte executed at Tyburn (London) for high treason.
- 30 August – American Revolutionary War: French fleet under the Comte de Grasse enters Chesapeake Bay, cutting British General Charles Cornwallis off from escape by sea.
- 5 September – American Revolutionary War: in the Battle of the Chesapeake, a British fleet under Thomas Graves arrives and fights de Grasse, but is unable to break through to relieve the Siege of Yorktown.
- 6 September – American Revolutionary War: Battle of Groton Heights – a British force under Benedict Arnold attacks a fort in Groton, Connecticut, achieving a strategic victory.
- 19 October – American Revolutionary War: following the Siege of Yorktown, General Charles Cornwallis surrenders to General George Washington at Yorktown, Virginia, ending the armed struggle of the American Revolutionary War.
- 29 November
  - Zong massacre: English slave traders begin to throw approximately 142 slaves taken on in Accra overboard alive from the slave ship Zong in the Caribbean Sea to conserve supplies for the remainder; the Liverpool owners subsequently attempt to reclaim part of their value from insurers.
  - Henry Hurle officially founds the Ancient Order of Druids in London.
- 3 December – first known building society established, in Birmingham.
- 12 December – American Revolutionary War: Second Battle of Ushant – the Royal Navy, commanded by Rear Admiral Richard Kempenfelt in HMS Victory, decisively defeats the French fleet in the Bay of Biscay.
- Last year in which the monarch participates in a regular peacetime meeting of the Cabinet.

== Publications ==
- Peter Beckford's Thoughts on Hunting.
- Edward Gibbon's The History of the Decline and Fall of the Roman Empire, volumes 2 and 3.
- John Wood, the Younger's pattern book A Series of Plans for Cottages or Habitations of the Labourer.
- The collection of children's poetry Mother Goose's Melody.

== Births ==
- 21 February – Bulkeley Bandinel, scholar-librarian (died 1861)
- 29 May – John Walker, inventor (died 1859)
- 9 June – George Stephenson, locomotive engineer (died 1848)
- 6 July – Stamford Raffles, founder of Singapore (died 1826)
- 8 July – Tom Cribb, bare-knuckle boxer (died 1848)
- 14 September – James Walker, Scottish civil engineer (died 1862)
- 3 November – Sarah Elizabeth Utterson, translator and author (died 1851)
- 6 November – Lucy Aikin, English writer (died 1864)
- 30 November – Alexander Berry, adventurer and Australian pioneer (died 1873)
- 11 December – Sir David Brewster, physicist (died 1868)

== Deaths ==
- 12 January – Richard Challoner, Catholic prelate (born 1691)
- 21 February – Matchem, racehorse (born 1748)
- 24 February – Edward Capell, critic (born 1713)
- 19 April – Elizabeth Raffald, cookery writer and entrepreneur (born 1733)
- 23 April – James Abercrombie, general (born 1706)
- 8 May – Richard Jago, poet (born 1715)
- 17 May – William Aislabie, politician (born 1700)
- 28 September – William Henry Nassau de Zuylestein, 4th Earl of Rochford, diplomat and statesman (born 1717)
- 16 October – Edward Hawke, 1st Baron Hawke, naval officer (born 1705)

== See also ==
- 1781 in Wales
