= 1704 in England =

- Centuries: 16th; 17th; 18th; 19th; 20th
- Decades: 1680s; 1690s; 1700s; 1710s; 1720s
- See also: Other events of 1704

Events from the year 1704 in England.

== Incumbents ==
- Monarch – Anne

== Events ==
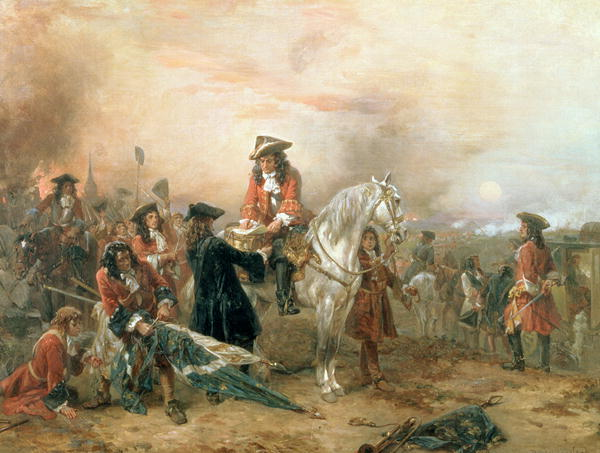
August 2 (13): Battle of Blenheim.

- 18 May – Robert Harley becomes Secretary of State for the Northern Department.
- 23 July (3 August New Style) – War of the Spanish Succession: Capture of Gibraltar from Spain by allied English and Dutch forces under Sir George Rooke.
- 2 August (13 August NS) – War of the Spanish Succession: At the Battle of Blenheim, an allied army under John Churchill, Earl of Marlborough and Prince Eugene of Savoy including English troops defeats the Franco-Bavarian army.
- 13 August (24 August NS) – War of the Spanish Succession: Allied French/Spanish and English/Dutch fleets clash in the Battle of Málaga off Málaga, causing heavy casualties on both sides but with no ships being sunk.
- 3 November – Queen Anne's Bounty (a fund established to augment the incomes of poorer Church of England clergy) receives a Royal Charter.

=== Undated ===
- Beau Nash becomes master of ceremonies at Bath, and an arbiter of fashion.
- Aaron Hart becomes rabbi of the Great Synagogue of London and de facto the country's first chief rabbi.
- Thomas Darley purchases the bay Arabian horse Darley Arabian in Aleppo, Syria, and ships him to stud in England where he becomes the most important foundation sire of all modern thoroughbred racing bloodstock.
- approx. date – the first modern orrery is built by George Graham and Thomas Tompion.

== Publications ==
- Isaac Newton's work Opticks.
- John Harris's Lexicon Technicum, an early encyclopedia.
- Daniel Defoe begins publication of A Review of the Affairs of France, a thrice-weekly newspaper reporting on the War of the Spanish Succession, and (in July) publishes his documentary account of the Great Storm of 1703, The Storm.
- Jonathan Swift's satire A Tale of a Tub with The Battle of the Books.

== Births ==
- 1 January – Soame Jenyns, writer (died 1787)
- 10 April – Benjamin Heath, classical scholar (died 1766)
- 4 June – Benjamin Huntsman, inventor and manufacturer (died 1776)
- 17 June – John Kay, inventor (died c. 1779 in France)
- 22 June – John Taylor, classical scholar (died 1766)
- 2 October (bapt.) – Eugene Aram, philologist and murderer (died 1759)
- 29 October – John Byng, admiral (executed 1757)

== Deaths ==
- 8 April – Henry Sydney, 1st Earl of Romney, statesman (born 1641)
- 18 June – Tom Brown, satirist (born 1662)
- 28 October – John Locke, philosopher (born 1632)
- 11 December – Roger L'Estrange, pamphleteer and author (born 1616)
