= John Tyler (bishop) =

Bishop of Llandaff, Wales (1640–1724)

John Tyler, DD (1640–1724) was a Dean of Hereford and a Bishop of Llandaff.

Tyler was educated at Magdalen College, Oxford. He held incumbencies at Shobdon, Litton Cheney and Brinsop. He was a Chaplain to William III and Mary II. He died on 8 July 1724.

== Notes ==
Church in Wales titles
Preceded by George Benson	Dean of Hereford; 1692–1706	Succeeded by Robert Clavering
Preceded by William Beaw	Bishop of Llandaff; 1707–1724	Succeeded by Robert Clavering
