= William Beaw =

English bishop; (1616–1706)

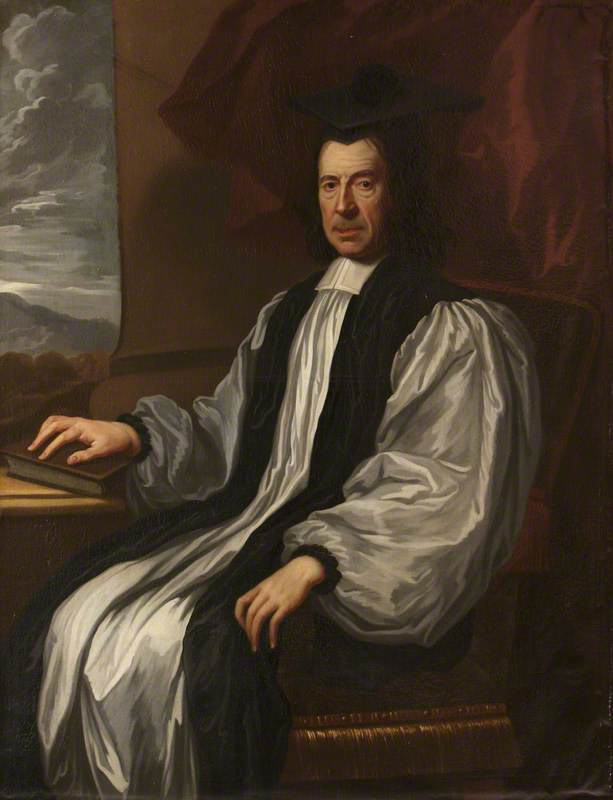
William Beaw

William Beaw (1616–1706), sometimes spelled Beau, was Bishop of Llandaff from 1679 until his death.

Beaw was educated at New College, Oxford. During the English Civil War he was a Major of a regiment of horse for Charles I. He also served Sweden in their war with Poland. In 1661 he became Vicar of Adderbury in Oxfordshire, a post he held until his elevation to the episcopate.

Beaw had a daughter, Jane, who married John Arundell, 3rd Baron Arundell of Trerice. Her will was proved on 14 July 1744.

== Notes ==
Church in Wales titles
Preceded by William Lloyd	Bishop of Llandaff; 1679–1706	Succeeded by John Tyler
