= John Evans (bishop) =

Welsh bishop

The Right Reverend John Evans
- Bishop of Meath
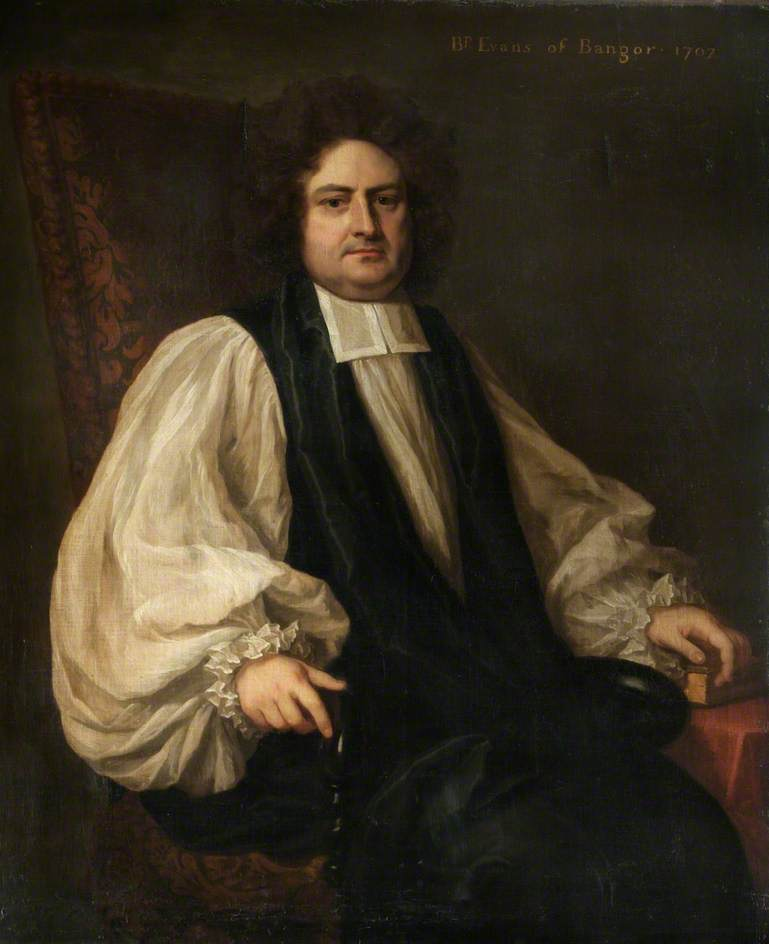
- Church: Church of Ireland
- Diocese: Meath
- Appointed: 10 February 1716
- In office: 1716-1724
- Predecessor: William Moreton
- Successor: Henry Downes
- Previous post: Bishop of Bangor (1702-1716)

Orders
- Consecration: 4 January 1702 by Henry Compton

Personal details
- Born: c. 1652 Llanarmon, Caernarfonshire, Wales
- Died: 2 March 1724 Dublin, Kingdom of Ireland
- Buried: Old Church of St George, Hill Street Dublin
- Denomination: Anglican
- Spouse: Elizabeth Trenchfield

John Evans (c. 1652 - 22 March 1724) was the Bishop of Meath from 1716 till 1724. He was one of the East India Company's chaplains, and served in Bengal and Madras.

== Life ==
Evans was born at Plas Du in the parish of Llanarmon, Carnarvonshire, and educated at Jesus College, Oxford. A John Evans of Jesus College graduated as B.A. in 1671. The birth-date 1660, given without authority in Webb's Compendium, is presumed inaccurate, as Evans went to India in 1678 as one of the East India Company's chaplains, and was posted to Hugly in Bengal. He was later at Madras, and in 1692 was one of the ministers attached to Fort St. George.

Evans had a bad character with the authorities, who called him "the merchant parson" and believed that he associated with "interlopers". The company in a letter to Madras (18 February 1690–1) call him "the quondam minister, but late great merchant", and a year later (22 January 1691–2) speak of discontinuing his salary. A letter of his own, dated London, 18 April 1698, seems to show that he had only recently left India. He then became rector of Llanaelhaiarn in his native county.

On 4 January 1702 Evans was consecrated Bishop of Bangor. Governor Thomas Pitt, one of his old interloping friends, jokes upon this appointment in a letter to Sir E. Littleton (Madras, 8 November 1702). He was a strong Whig in politics. Francis Atterbury mentions an altercation with him in Convocation in June 1702. Evans said in the upper house that Atterbury, the prolocutor of the lower house, had lied, which he explained on being challenged by saying that the prolocutor had told a great untruth.

In 1712 Evans joined the Duke of Marlborough in signing a protest against the peace, which was ordered to be expunged from the journals by the majority. He was translated to Meath in January 1715–16 and enthroned on 3 February following; this move left Wales without a single Welsh-speaking bishop. In Ireland he quarrelled with Jonathan Swift, who, according to his own account, had been civil to the bishop in spite of their political differences. Swift refused to attend his visitation at Laracor, and told him to remember that he was speaking to a clergyman and not to a footman. He was, however, a friend of Bishop William Nicolson, and seems to have been respected.

== Death and legacy ==
Evans died at Dublin on 22 March 1724, and was buried in the churchyard of St. George's Chapel, under a monument upon which his widow commemorated his many virtues and his twenty years' chaplaincy in India. He left £1,000 for an episcopal house at Ardbraccan, £140 for the rectory of Llanaelhaiarn, the personal estate acquired previously to his translation to be applied by the governors of Queen Anne's Bounty for the benefit of poor clergy in England, and that afterwards acquired for the benefit of churches in Meath.
