= 1782 in Wales =

- Centuries: 16th; 17th; 18th; 19th; 20th
- Decades: 1760s; 1770s; 1780s; 1790s; 1800s
- See also: List of years in Wales; Timeline of Welsh history 1782 in Great Britain Scotland Elsewhere

This article is about the particular significance of the year 1782 to Wales and its people.

== Incumbents ==
- Lord Lieutenant of Anglesey - Sir Nicholas Bayly, 2nd Baronet (until 1 August) Henry Paget (from 1 August)
- Lord Lieutenant of Brecknockshire and Monmouthshire – Charles Morgan of Dderw
- Lord Lieutenant of Caernarvonshire - Thomas Bulkeley, 7th Viscount Bulkeley
- Lord Lieutenant of Cardiganshire – Wilmot Vaughan, 1st Earl of Lisburne
- Lord Lieutenant of Carmarthenshire – John Vaughan
- Lord Lieutenant of Denbighshire - Richard Myddelton
- Lord Lieutenant of Flintshire - Sir Roger Mostyn, 5th Baronet
- Lord Lieutenant of Glamorgan – John Stuart, Lord Mountstuart
- Lord Lieutenant of Merionethshire - Sir Watkin Williams-Wynn, 4th Baronet
- Lord Lieutenant of Montgomeryshire – George Herbert, 2nd Earl of Powis
- Lord Lieutenant of Pembrokeshire – Sir Hugh Owen, 5th Baronet
- Lord Lieutenant of Radnorshire – Edward Harley, 4th Earl of Oxford and Earl Mortimer
- Bishop of Bangor – John Moore
- Bishop of Llandaff – Shute Barrington (until 27 August); Richard Watson (from 20 October)
- Bishop of St Asaph – Jonathan Shipley
- Bishop of St Davids – John Warren

== Events ==
- March - Lloyd Kenyon is appointed Attorney-General.
- 12 April - In the Battle of the Saintes, the British fleet defeat the French after a campaign in which Admiral Sir Thomas Foley has played a major part.
- 27 September - Francis Homfray leases a mill from Anthony Bacon of Cyfarthfa ironworks. (Under the terms of the new House of Commons (Disqualification) Act 1782 (22 Geo. 3. c. 45), Bacon, as an MP, is disqualified from holding government munitions contracts.)
- William Owen Pughe and Robert Hughes (Robin Ddu yr Ail o Fôn) meet in London.
- David Davis (Castellhywel) settles in Castellhywel.

== Arts and literature ==
=== New books ===
- William Gilpin - Observations on the River Wye and several parts of South Wales, etc. relative chiefly to Picturesque Beauty; made in the summer of the year 1770
- Thomas Pennant - Journey to Snowdon, volume 1
- John Walters - Translated Specimens of Welsh Poetry

=== Music ===
- William Williams Pantycelyn - Rhai Hymnau Newyddion (second in a series of hymn collections)

== Births ==
- 20 January - Sir William Nott, military leader (died 1845)
- 29 December - Sir William Lloyd, soldier and mountaineer (died 1857)
- unknown date - William Morgan, evangelical clergyman (died 1858)

== Deaths ==
- March - John Evans, anti-Methodist clergyman, 79
- 27 April - William Talbot, 1st Earl Talbot, politician, 71
- 15 May - Richard Wilson, landscape painter, 54
- 25 August - Lady Catherine Hamilton, formerly Catherine Barlow of Colby, heiress to an estate in south Pembrokeshire which passed to her nephew Charles Francis Greville
- November - John Parry, harpist, 72?
- 9 December - Sir Nicholas Bayly, 2nd Baronet, Lord Lieutenant of Anglesey, 73
