= 1780 in Wales =

- Centuries: 16th; 17th; 18th; 19th; 20th
- Decades: 1760s; 1770s; 1780s; 1790s; 1800s
- See also: List of years in Wales; Timeline of Welsh history 1780 in Great Britain Scotland Elsewhere

This article is about the particular significance of the year 1780 to Wales and its people.

== Incumbents ==
- Lord Lieutenant of Anglesey - Sir Nicholas Bayly, 2nd Baronet
- Lord Lieutenant of Brecknockshire and Monmouthshire – Charles Morgan of Dderw
- Lord Lieutenant of Caernarvonshire - Thomas Wynn
- Lord Lieutenant of Cardiganshire – Wilmot Vaughan, 1st Earl of Lisburne
- Lord Lieutenant of Carmarthenshire – Thomas Johnes (until 28 April); John Vaughan (from 28 April
- Lord Lieutenant of Denbighshire - Richard Myddelton
- Lord Lieutenant of Flintshire - Sir Roger Mostyn, 5th Baronet
- Lord Lieutenant of Glamorgan – John Stuart, Lord Mountstuart
- Lord Lieutenant of Merionethshire - Sir Watkin Williams-Wynn, 4th Baronet
- Lord Lieutenant of Montgomeryshire – George Herbert, 2nd Earl of Powis
- Lord Lieutenant of Pembrokeshire – Sir Hugh Owen, 5th Baronet
- Lord Lieutenant of Radnorshire – Edward Harley, 4th Earl of Oxford and Earl Mortimer
- Bishop of Bangor – John Moore
- Bishop of Llandaff – Shute Barrington
- Bishop of St Asaph – Jonathan Shipley
- Bishop of St Davids – John Warren

== Events ==
- January - Admiral Sir Thomas Foley plays an important role in the relief of Gibraltar.
- 1 July - Anthony Bacon acquires the lease of the Hirwaun ironworks.
- 26 August - Edward Williames Salusbury Vaughan succeeds to the Rûg estate.
- 29 September - Sir Watkin Lewes is elected Lord Mayor of London.
- unknown dates
  - Thomas Parry Jones-Parry marries his cousin Margaret and acquires the Madryn estate.
  - The Ladies of Llangollen settle at Plas Newydd.
  - St David's Club established in Aberystwyth, the oldest gentlemen's club in Wales.
  - Richard Price devises the "Northampton Tables" for calculating actuarial valuation for assurance and pensions.
  - The development of Ebbw Vale Steelworks begins.

== Arts and literature ==
=== New books ===
- John Walters - Poems with Notes

=== Music ===
- Henry Mills of Llanidloes impresses Thomas Charles so much with his singing that he is appointed to supervise the improvement of congregational singing in the district.

== Births ==
- 10 February - James Henry Cotton, Dean of Bangor (died 1862)
- 15 April - Angharad Llwyd, antiquary (died 1866)
- 14 May - Sir Thomas Frankland Lewis, politician (died 1855)
- 7 October - Wyndham Lewis, MP (died 1838)
- date unknown
  - Dic Aberdaron (Richard Robert Jones), traveller and linguist (died 1843)
  - Thomas Prothero, lawyer and businessman (died 1853)

== Deaths ==
- 6 March - Sir John Meredith, lawyer, 65
- 1 April - Sir Stephen Glynne, 7th Baronet, 35 (ruptured blood-vessel)
- May - Thomas Johnes, Lord Lieutenant of Carmarthenshire, about 59
- date unknown
  - Howell Gwynne, former MP and Lord Lieutenant of Radnorshire, 61/62
  - Richard Thomas, genealogist, 46
