= 1785 in Wales =

- Centuries: 16th; 17th; 18th; 19th; 20th
- Decades: 1760s; 1770s; 1780s; 1790s; 1800s
- See also: List of years in Wales; Timeline of Welsh history 1785 in Great Britain Scotland Elsewhere

This article is about the particular significance of the year 1785 to Wales and its people.

== Incumbents ==
- Lord Lieutenant of Anglesey - Henry Paget
- Lord Lieutenant of Brecknockshire and Monmouthshire – Charles Morgan of Dderw
- Lord Lieutenant of Caernarvonshire - Thomas Bulkeley, 7th Viscount Bulkeley
- Lord Lieutenant of Cardiganshire – Wilmot Vaughan, 1st Earl of Lisburne
- Lord Lieutenant of Carmarthenshire – John Vaughan
- Lord Lieutenant of Denbighshire - Richard Myddelton
- Lord Lieutenant of Flintshire - Sir Roger Mostyn, 5th Baronet
- Lord Lieutenant of Glamorgan – John Stuart, Lord Mountstuart
- Lord Lieutenant of Merionethshire - Sir Watkin Williams-Wynn, 4th Baronet
- Lord Lieutenant of Montgomeryshire – George Herbert, 2nd Earl of Powis
- Lord Lieutenant of Pembrokeshire – Sir Hugh Owen, 5th Baronet
- Lord Lieutenant of Radnorshire – Edward Harley, 4th Earl of Oxford and Earl Mortimer
- Bishop of Bangor – John Warren
- Bishop of Llandaff – Richard Watson
- Bishop of St Asaph – Jonathan Shipley
- Bishop of St Davids – Edward Smallwell

== Events ==
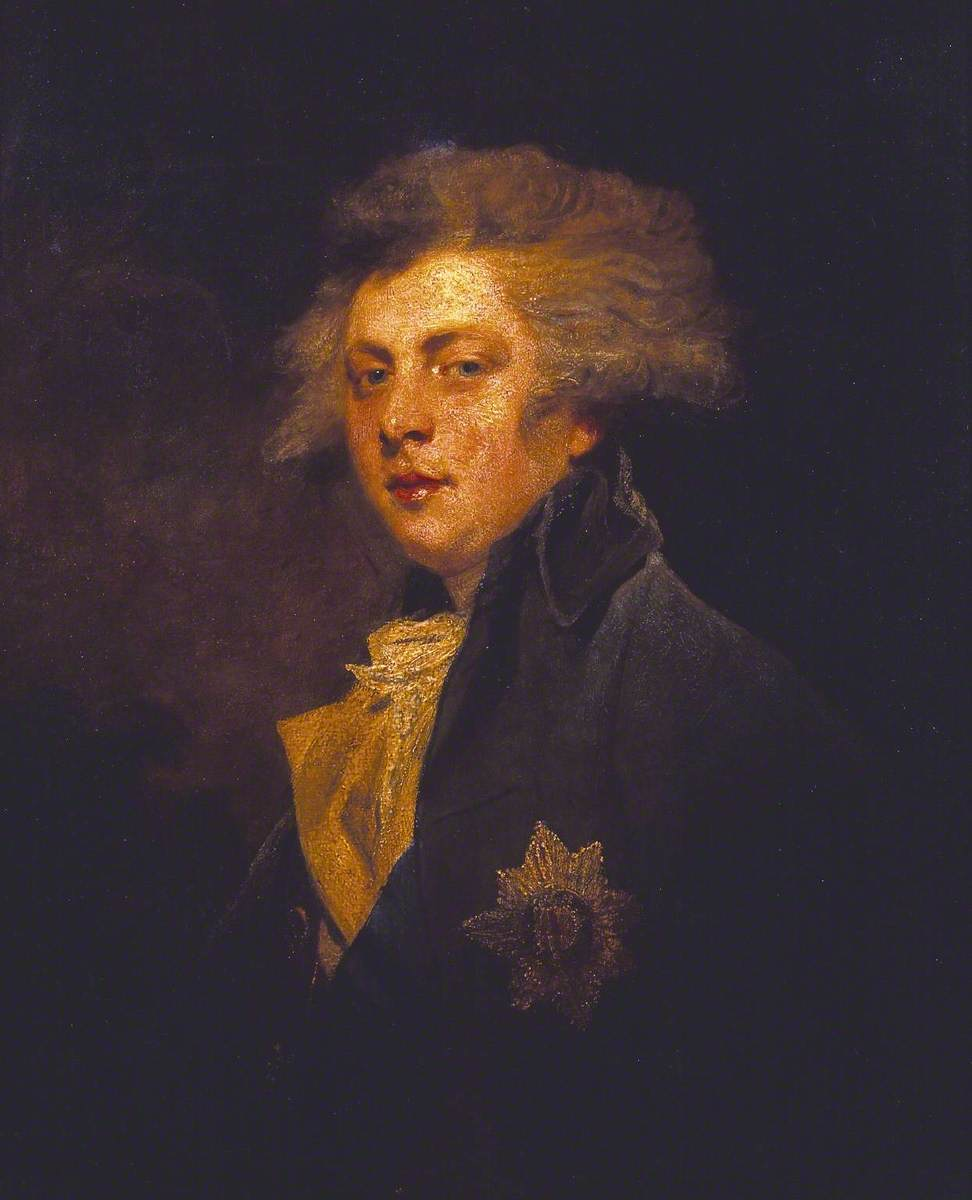
Joshua Reynolds' 1785 portrait of George, Prince of Wales

- October - The Mona Mine Company is formed by Thomas Williams of Llanidan and Henry Bayly Paget, 1st Earl of Uxbridge.
- date unknown
  - Richard Pennant buys out the Yonge family of Devon and comes into possession of the whole of the Penrhyn estate.
  - Griffith Rowlands becomes surgeon to Chester city hospital.
  - Sir Joshua Reynolds paints George, Prince of Wales.

== Arts and literature ==
=== New books ===
- Anna Maria Bennett - Anna: or Memoirs of a Welch Heiress
- Florence Miscellany (including poems by Hester Thrale)
- Nathaniel Williams - Darllen Dwfr a Meddyginiaeth

== Births ==
- 2 February - John Josiah Guest, engineer and industrialist (died 1852)
- 9 August - John Henry Vivian, copper merchant, industrialist and politician (died 1855)
- December - Richard Jones (Gwyndaf Eryri), poet (died 1848)
- 24 December - William Bruce Knight, clergyman and scholar (died 1845)
- date unknown
  - David Hughes, Anglican priest and writer (died 1850)
  - William Owen, historian (died 1864)

== Deaths ==
- 27 February - Robert Hughes, poet (Robin Ddu o Fôn)
- 25 April - Sir Charles Tynte, 5th Baronet, politician, 74
- June - Siôn Bradford, poet, 78?
- 20 October - David Jones of Trefriw, poet, 77?
- November (probable) - John Guest, industrialist, 72/73
