= 1783 in Wales =

- Centuries: 16th; 17th; 18th; 19th; 20th
- Decades: 1760s; 1770s; 1780s; 1790s; 1800s
- See also: List of years in Wales; Timeline of Welsh history 1783 in Great Britain Scotland Elsewhere

This article is about the particular significance of the year 1783 to Wales and its people.

== Incumbents ==
- Lord Lieutenant of Anglesey - Sir Nicholas Bayly, 2nd Baronet (until 1 August) Henry Paget (from 1 August)
- Lord Lieutenant of Brecknockshire and Monmouthshire – Charles Morgan of Dderw
- Lord Lieutenant of Caernarvonshire - Thomas Bulkeley, 7th Viscount Bulkeley
- Lord Lieutenant of Cardiganshire – Wilmot Vaughan, 1st Earl of Lisburne
- Lord Lieutenant of Carmarthenshire – John Vaughan
- Lord Lieutenant of Denbighshire - Richard Myddelton
- Lord Lieutenant of Flintshire - Sir Roger Mostyn, 5th Baronet
- Lord Lieutenant of Glamorgan – John Stuart, Lord Mountstuart
- Lord Lieutenant of Merionethshire - Sir Watkin Williams-Wynn, 4th Baronet
- Lord Lieutenant of Montgomeryshire – George Herbert, 2nd Earl of Powis
- Lord Lieutenant of Pembrokeshire – Sir Hugh Owen, 5th Baronet
- Lord Lieutenant of Radnorshire – Edward Harley, 4th Earl of Oxford and Earl Mortimer
- Bishop of Bangor – John Moore (until 26 April) John Warren (from 26 April)
- Bishop of Llandaff – Richard Watson
- Bishop of St Asaph – Jonathan Shipley
- Bishop of St Davids – Edward Smallwell (from 6 July)

== Events ==
- 20 August - Thomas Charles marries Sally Jones and settles in Bala.
- 26 September - Industrialist and slave-owner Richard Pennant is created 1st Baron Penrhyn in the county of Lough.
- Welsh emigrant Evan Williams founds a whiskey distillery in Bardstown, Kentucky, United States, which will still be operating in the 21st century.

== Arts and literature ==
=== New books ===
- Julia Ann Hatton - Poems on Miscellaneous Subjects

=== Music ===
- Evan Hughes (Hughes Fawr) - Rhai Hymnau Newyddion o Fawl i'r Oen

== Births ==
- 11 February - Thomas Richard, minister (died 1856)
- 16 March - Henry Williams-Wynn, politician (died 1856)
- May - Cadwaladr Jones, minister and literary editor (died 1867)
- unknown dates
  - Hugh Jones, archdeacon of Essex (died 1869)

== Deaths ==
- 19 June - Henry Lloyd, soldier and military writer
- 7 August - Thomas Llewellyn, Baptist minister and writer, 63?
- 2 September - Edward Edwards, academic
- 6 September - Anna Williams, friend of Dr Johnson, 77?
- 16 December - Sir William James, 1st Baronet, naval commander, 61-62
