= 1709 in Wales =

- Centuries: 16th; 17th; 18th; 19th; 20th
- Decades: 1680s; 1690s; 1700s; 1710s; 1720s
- See also: List of years in Wales; Timeline of Welsh history 1709 in Great Britain Scotland Elsewhere

This article is about the particular significance of the year 1709 to Wales and its people.

== Incumbents ==
- Lord Lieutenant of North Wales (Lord Lieutenant of Anglesey, Caernarvonshire, Denbighshire, Flintshire, Merionethshire, Montgomeryshire) – Hugh Cholmondeley, 1st Earl of Cholmondeley
- Lord Lieutenant of South Wales (Lord Lieutenant of Glamorgan, Brecknockshire, Cardiganshire, Carmarthenshire, Monmouthshire, Pembrokeshire, Radnorshire) – Thomas Herbert, 8th Earl of Pembroke
- Bishop of Bangor – John Evans
- Bishop of Llandaff – John Tyler
- Bishop of St Asaph – William Fleetwood
- Bishop of St Davids – George Bull

== Events ==
- 19 July - David Parry is appointed keeper of the Ashmolean Museum, in succession to Edward Lhuyd.
- 1 December - William Gambold, son of John Gambold of Puncheston, becomes rector of Puncheston with Llanychaer.
- date unknown
  - Griffith Jones (Llanddowror) takes charge of a school at Laugharne.
  - The "Company of Mine Adventures", headed by Humphrey Mackworth, goes bankrupt.
  - Humphrey Foulkes becomes rector of Marchwiel.

== Arts and literature ==
=== New books ===
- Edward Holdsworth - The mouse-trap; or, The Welsh engagement with the mice (a mock-heroic satire on the Welsh people, published anonymously)

== Births ==
- March - William Wynn, clergyman and poet (died 1760)
- 11 June - Philip David, Independent minister (died 1787)
- date unknown
  - Sir William Glynne, 5th Baronet (died 1730)
  - Joseph Hoare, academic (died 1802)
  - David Williams, schoolmaster (died 1784)

== Deaths ==
- 22 January - Henry Herbert, 1st Baron Herbert of Chirbury, politician, 54
- 6 June - James Herbert, politician, about 55
- 30 June - Edward Lhuyd, naturalist and antiquary, 49
- 22 August - John Jones, clergyman and physician, 63/64
- August - Huw Morus, poet, 86/87

== See also ==
- 1709 in Scotland
