= 1778 in Wales =

- Centuries: 16th; 17th; 18th; 19th; 20th
- Decades: 1750s; 1760s; 1770s; 1780s; 1790s
- See also: List of years in Wales; Timeline of Welsh history 1778 in Great Britain Scotland Elsewhere

This article is about the particular significance of the year 1778 to Wales and its people.

== Incumbents ==
- Lord Lieutenant of Anglesey - Sir Nicholas Bayly, 2nd Baronet
- Lord Lieutenant of Brecknockshire and Monmouthshire – Charles Morgan of Dderw
- Lord Lieutenant of Caernarvonshire - Thomas Wynn
- Lord Lieutenant of Cardiganshire – Wilmot Vaughan, 1st Earl of Lisburne
- Lord Lieutenant of Carmarthenshire – George Rice
- Lord Lieutenant of Denbighshire - Richard Myddelton
- Lord Lieutenant of Flintshire - Sir Roger Mostyn, 5th Baronet
- Lord Lieutenant of Glamorgan – John Stuart, Lord Mountstuart
- Lord Lieutenant of Merionethshire - Sir Watkin Williams-Wynn, 4th Baronet
- Lord Lieutenant of Montgomeryshire – George Herbert, 2nd Earl of Powis
- Lord Lieutenant of Pembrokeshire – Sir Hugh Owen, 5th Baronet
- Lord Lieutenant of Radnorshire – Edward Harley, 4th Earl of Oxford and Earl Mortimer
- Bishop of Bangor – John Moore
- Bishop of Llandaff – Shute Barrington
- Bishop of St Asaph – Jonathan Shipley
- Bishop of St Davids – James Yorke

== Events ==
- 9 September - Benjamin Millingchamp, is appointed chaplain on board the flagship of Admiral Sir Edward Hughes.
- date unknown
  - A furnace is built at Sirhowy by Thomas Atkinson and William Barrow of London. This is the first stage of the Tredegar ironworks.
  - Elizabeth Baker leaves her job as secretary to Hugh Vaughan at Hengwrt to live in the adjoining house of Doluwcheogryd.
  - Claiming himself as a prophet, watchmaker James Birch founds his own religious sect, the "Birchites", in Pembrokeshire.

== Arts and literature ==
=== New books ===
- Thomas Jones - Traethiadau ar Gatecism Eglwys Loegr: gyda phregeth ar Gonffirmasiwn (translation)
- Thomas Pennant - Tour in Wales
- David William - Gorfoledd ym Mhebyll Seion
- Nathaniel Williams - Dialogus

=== Music ===
- Blind harpist John Parry and his son David play Handel's choruses on two Welsh harps at the court of King George III of Great Britain.

== Births ==
- 28 July - Jacob Owen, architect, (died 1870)
- 21 August - Lewis Weston Dillwyn, porcelain manufacturer, naturalist and politician (died 1855)
- September - William Howels, preacher (died 1832)
- 29 September - Benjamin Hall, industrialist and politician (died 1817)
- 20 November - Thomas Williams (Gwilym Morgannwg), poet (died 1835)
- 24 November - Salusbury Pryce Humphreys, admiral (died 1845)
- date unknown - David Rowlands, naval surgeon (died 1846)

== Deaths ==
- 25 April - James Relly, Methodist minister, 56?
- 6 October - William Worthington, priest and author, 74
- date unknown - William Owen, Royal Navy officer, 40/41
