= 1781 in Wales =

- Centuries: 16th; 17th; 18th; 19th; 20th
- Decades: 1760s; 1770s; 1780s; 1790s; 1800s
- See also: List of years in Wales; Timeline of Welsh history 1781 in Great Britain Scotland Elsewhere

This article is about the particular significance of the year 1781 to Wales and its people.

== Incumbents ==
- Lord Lieutenant of Anglesey - Sir Nicholas Bayly, 2nd Baronet
- Lord Lieutenant of Brecknockshire and Monmouthshire – Charles Morgan of Dderw
- Lord Lieutenant of Caernarvonshire - Thomas Wynn (until 27 December); Thomas Bulkeley, 7th Viscount Bulkeley (from 27 December)
- Lord Lieutenant of Cardiganshire – Wilmot Vaughan, 1st Earl of Lisburne
- Lord Lieutenant of Carmarthenshire – John Vaughan
- Lord Lieutenant of Denbighshire - Richard Myddelton
- Lord Lieutenant of Flintshire - Sir Roger Mostyn, 5th Baronet
- Lord Lieutenant of Glamorgan – John Stuart, Lord Mountstuart
- Lord Lieutenant of Merionethshire - Sir Watkin Williams-Wynn, 4th Baronet
- Lord Lieutenant of Montgomeryshire – George Herbert, 2nd Earl of Powis
- Lord Lieutenant of Pembrokeshire – Sir Hugh Owen, 5th Baronet
- Lord Lieutenant of Radnorshire – Edward Harley, 4th Earl of Oxford and Earl Mortimer
- Bishop of Bangor – John Moore
- Bishop of Llandaff – Shute Barrington
- Bishop of St Asaph – Jonathan Shipley
- Bishop of St Davids – John Warren

== Events ==
- June - The Chancery court agrees the sale of the Kinmel estate to a London buyer.
- Richard Price is made an honorary LL.D. by Yale University, in the company of George Washington.

== Arts and literature ==
=== New books ===
- Thomas Pennant - Tours in Wales, volume 2

=== Music ===
- John Parry (harpist) - British Harmony, being a Collection of Antient Welsh Airs

== Births ==
- 11 March (baptised) – Lucy Thomas, colliery owner ('The Mother of the Welsh Steam Coal Trade') (d. 1847)
- ?November - William Williams of Wern, Independent minister (d. 1840)
- 1 November – Robert Thomas, newspaper proprietor (died 1860 in Australia)
- 28 November – Love Jones-Parry, soldier, politician and High Sheriff of Anglesey (d. 1853)

== Deaths ==
- 4 April – Henry Thrale, brewer, 556-57
- 7 May – Sir William Owen, 4th Baronet of Orielton, politician, 84
- 30 June – John Pettingall, Anglican clergyman and antiquarian, about 73
- 12 October – David Powell (Dewi Nantbrân), Franciscan friar and author
