= 1784 in Wales =

- Centuries: 16th; 17th; 18th; 19th; 20th
- Decades: 1760s; 1770s; 1780s; 1790s; 1800s
- See also: List of years in Wales; Timeline of Welsh history 1784 in Great Britain Scotland Elsewhere

This article is about the particular significance of the year 1784 to Wales and its people.

== Incumbents ==
- Lord Lieutenant of Anglesey - Henry Paget (from 1 August)
- Lord Lieutenant of Brecknockshire and Monmouthshire – Charles Morgan of Dderw
- Lord Lieutenant of Caernarvonshire - Thomas Bulkeley, 7th Viscount Bulkeley
- Lord Lieutenant of Cardiganshire – Wilmot Vaughan, 1st Earl of Lisburne
- Lord Lieutenant of Carmarthenshire – John Vaughan
- Lord Lieutenant of Denbighshire - Richard Myddelton
- Lord Lieutenant of Flintshire - Sir Roger Mostyn, 5th Baronet
- Lord Lieutenant of Glamorgan – John Stuart, Lord Mountstuart
- Lord Lieutenant of Merionethshire - Sir Watkin Williams-Wynn, 4th Baronet
- Lord Lieutenant of Montgomeryshire – George Herbert, 2nd Earl of Powis
- Lord Lieutenant of Pembrokeshire – Sir Hugh Owen, 5th Baronet
- Lord Lieutenant of Radnorshire – Edward Harley, 4th Earl of Oxford and Earl Mortimer
- Bishop of Bangor – John Warren
- Bishop of Llandaff – Richard Watson
- Bishop of St Asaph – Jonathan Shipley
- Bishop of St Davids – Edward Smallwell

== Events ==
- 30 March - Lloyd Kenyon becomes Master of the Rolls.
- 7 May - Lady Henrietta Herbert, heiress of the Earl of Powis, marries Edward Clive, 2nd Baron Clive of Plassey.
- 14 May - Thomas James Bulkeley, 7th Viscount Bulkeley, is created Baron Bulkeley.
- 19 May - Henry Bayly Paget, 9th Baron Paget, is created Earl of Uxbridge.
- 23-25 July - Hester Thrale marries Gabriele Piozzi, much to the displeasure of Dr Samuel Johnson.
- 28 July - Lloyd Kenyon is raised to a baronetcy.
- unknown date – Samuel Homfray and his brother quarrel with Anthony Bacon and take out a lease of one of the richest iron-ore deposits in the district (which develops into the Penydarren ironworks).

== Arts and literature ==
=== New books ===
- Richard Price – Importance of the American Revolution

=== Music ===
- Edward Jones (Bardd y Brenin) – The Musical and Poetical Relicks of the Welsh Bards, including first publication of the harp air Dafydd y Garreg Wen

== Births ==
- 17 January – Joseph Tregelles Price, ironmaster (died 1854)
- 25 May – John Frost, Chartist leader (died 1877)
- 16 December - Mary Jones, purchaser of an early Welsh-language Bible (died 1864)
- date unknown
  - Walter Coffin, coal-owner (died 1867)
  - Anthony Hill, ironmaster (died 1862)
  - David Owen (Dewi Wyn o Eifion), poet (died 1841)

== Deaths ==
- 8 February – Christopher Bassett, Methodist exhorter, 30 (tuberculosis)
- March – John Evans, Methodist exhorter, 47?
- 5 April – David Williams, minister and schoolmaster, 74?
- December – John Richard, Calvinistic Methodist exhorter and hymn-writer, age unknown
- date unknown
  - John Hanbury III, ironmaster, 40?
  - Stafford Prys, publisher, 52?
