= 1779 in Wales =

- Centuries: 16th; 17th; 18th; 19th; 20th
- Decades: 1750s; 1760s; 1770s; 1780s; 1790s
- See also: List of years in Wales; Timeline of Welsh history 1779 in Great Britain Scotland Elsewhere

This article is about the particular significance of the year 1779 to Wales and its people.

== Incumbents ==
- Lord Lieutenant of Anglesey - Sir Nicholas Bayly, 2nd Baronet
- Lord Lieutenant of Brecknockshire and Monmouthshire – Charles Morgan of Dderw
- Lord Lieutenant of Caernarvonshire - Thomas Wynn
- Lord Lieutenant of Cardiganshire – Wilmot Vaughan, 1st Earl of Lisburne
- Lord Lieutenant of Carmarthenshire – George Rice (until 3 August) Thomas Johnes (from 7 September)
- Lord Lieutenant of Denbighshire - Richard Myddelton
- Lord Lieutenant of Flintshire - Sir Roger Mostyn, 5th Baronet
- Lord Lieutenant of Glamorgan – John Stuart, Lord Mountstuart
- Lord Lieutenant of Merionethshire - Sir Watkin Williams-Wynn, 4th Baronet
- Lord Lieutenant of Montgomeryshire – George Herbert, 2nd Earl of Powis
- Lord Lieutenant of Pembrokeshire – Sir Hugh Owen, 5th Baronet
- Lord Lieutenant of Radnorshire – Edward Harley, 4th Earl of Oxford and Earl Mortimer
- Bishop of Bangor – John Moore
- Bishop of Llandaff – Shute Barrington
- Bishop of St Asaph – Jonathan Shipley
- Bishop of St Davids – James Yorke (until 2 August); John Warren (from 19 September)

== Events ==
- February - Ship's surgeon David Samwell witnesses the death of Captain James Cook in Hawaii.
- June - Valentine Morris, governor of St Vincent, negotiates unfavourable surrender terms with the French.
- unknown dates
  - New bridges are built over the River Wye at Builth Wells and River Towy at Llandeilo.
  - Haverfordwest prison is built on the site of the former castle.
  - Baptist Assembly at Glynceiriog.
  - Robert Jones, Calvinistic Methodist exhorter, preaches in London.

== Arts and literature ==
=== New books ===
- David William - Joy in the Tents of Zion (English edition)

=== Music ===
- Richard Morris creates a list of "Henwau Mesurau Cerdd Dafod a Thant a arferir yn gyffredinol gan y Prydyddion a'r Telynorion yng Nghymru".

== Births ==
- 14 March - William Ormsby-Gore, politician (died 1860)
- 24 August - Charles Norris, artist (died 1858)

== Deaths ==
- June/July - Hugh Williams, Anglican clergyman and writer
- 3 August - George Rice, Lord Lieutenant and MP for Carmarthenshire, 55
- 9 August - Morgan Rhys, hymn-writer, 63
- 11 December - "Madam" Bridget Bevan, philanthropist, 81
- December - Richard Morris, collector of folk songs, 76
- date unknown - Edward Jones, composer, 49/50
