= 1787 in Wales =

- Centuries: 16th; 17th; 18th; 19th; 20th
- Decades: 1760s; 1770s; 1780s; 1790s; 1800s
- See also: List of years in Wales; Timeline of Welsh history 1787 in Great Britain Scotland Elsewhere

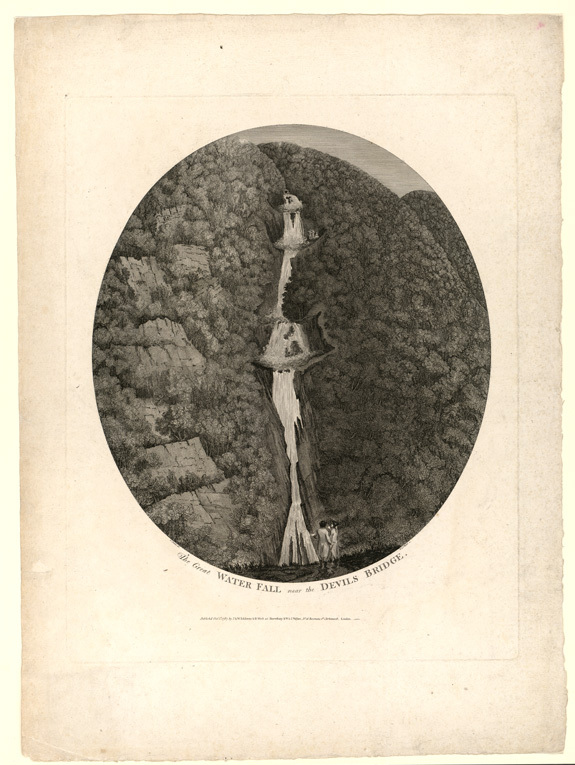
Devils Bridge waterfall 1787

This article is about the particular significance of the year 1787 to Wales and its people.

== Incumbents ==
- Lord Lieutenant of Anglesey - Henry Paget
- Lord Lieutenant of Brecknockshire and Monmouthshire – Charles Morgan of Dderw (until 24 May); Henry Somerset, 5th Duke of Beaufort (from 8 June)
- Lord Lieutenant of Caernarvonshire - Thomas Bulkeley, 7th Viscount Bulkeley
- Lord Lieutenant of Cardiganshire – Wilmot Vaughan, 1st Earl of Lisburne
- Lord Lieutenant of Carmarthenshire – John Vaughan
- Lord Lieutenant of Denbighshire - Richard Myddelton
- Lord Lieutenant of Flintshire - Sir Roger Mostyn, 5th Baronet
- Lord Lieutenant of Glamorgan – John Stuart, Lord Mountstuart
- Lord Lieutenant of Merionethshire - Sir Watkin Williams-Wynn, 4th Baronet
- Lord Lieutenant of Montgomeryshire – George Herbert, 2nd Earl of Powis
- Lord Lieutenant of Pembrokeshire – Richard Philipps, 1st Baron Milford
- Lord Lieutenant of Radnorshire – Edward Harley, 4th Earl of Oxford and Earl Mortimer
- Bishop of Bangor – John Warren
- Bishop of Llandaff – Richard Watson
- Bishop of St Asaph – Jonathan Shipley
- Bishop of St Davids – Edward Smallwell

== Events ==
- March - Hester Piozzi returns from Italy with her second husband.
- November - Richard Crawshay uses puddling at the Cyfarthfa ironworks.
- December - Evan Evans (Ieuan Fardd), shortly before his death, sells his manuscript collection.
- date unknown
  - Thomas Charles opens his first Sunday school, at Hengoed.
  - The first Cymmrodorion Society is disbanded.
  - Iolo Morganwg spends time as a prisoner in Cardiff jail.
  - Construction of Margam orangery begins.
  - The Baptist Association endorses the "pocket Bible" published by David Jones and Peter Williams.

== Arts and literature ==
=== New books ===
- John Thelwall - Poems upon various subjects

=== Music ===
- Elis Roberts - Pedwar Chwarter y Flwyddyn
- Nathaniel Williams - Ychydig o Hymnau Newyddion
- William Williams Pantycelyn - Rhai Hymnau Newyddion

== Sport ==
- 27 February - Royal British Bowmen, an archery society, formed in Wrexham.

== Births ==
- 26 May - Richard Jones, printer (died 1855)
- 8 June - William Conybeare, geologist (died 1857)
- 9 July - Taliesin Williams, poet and author (died 1847)
- 2 October - Thomas Price (Carnhuanawc), historian (died 1848)

== Deaths ==
- 3 February - Philip David, Independent minister, 77
- 24 May - Charles Morgan of Dderw, politician, 50
- 18 June - John Egerton, controversial Bishop of Bangor 1756–1768, 65.
- 3 November - Robert Lowth, Bishop of St David's 1766, 76
- date unknown - William Elias, poet, 79
