= 1789 in Wales =

- Centuries: 16th; 17th; 18th; 19th; 20th
- Decades: 1760s; 1770s; 1780s; 1790s; 1800s
- See also: List of years in Wales; Timeline of Welsh history 1789 in Great Britain Scotland Elsewhere

This article is about the particular significance of the year 1789 to Wales and its people.

== Incumbents ==
- Lord Lieutenant of Anglesey - Henry Paget
- Lord Lieutenant of Brecknockshire and Monmouthshire – Henry Somerset, 5th Duke of Beaufort
- Lord Lieutenant of Caernarvonshire - Thomas Bulkeley, 7th Viscount Bulkeley
- Lord Lieutenant of Cardiganshire – Wilmot Vaughan, 1st Earl of Lisburne
- Lord Lieutenant of Carmarthenshire – John Vaughan
- Lord Lieutenant of Denbighshire - Richard Myddelton
- Lord Lieutenant of Flintshire - Sir Roger Mostyn, 5th Baronet
- Lord Lieutenant of Glamorgan – John Stuart, Lord Mountstuart
- Lord Lieutenant of Merionethshire - Sir Watkin Williams-Wynn, 4th Baronet (until 24 July); Watkin Williams (from 27 August)
- Lord Lieutenant of Montgomeryshire – George Herbert, 2nd Earl of Powis
- Lord Lieutenant of Pembrokeshire – Richard Philipps, 1st Baron Milford
- Lord Lieutenant of Radnorshire – Edward Harley, 4th Earl of Oxford and Earl Mortimer
- Bishop of Bangor – John Warren
- Bishop of Llandaff – Richard Watson
- Bishop of St Asaph – Samuel Hallifax (from 4 April)
- Bishop of St Davids – Samuel Horsley

== Events ==
- July–August - Bread riots break out in North Wales.
- 23 October - Christmas Evans marries Catherine Jones at Bryncroes chapel in Llŷn, shortly after his own ordination.
- 8 November - Port Penrhyn opens.
- unknown date - Blaenavon Ironworks begins production.

== Arts and literature ==
- 12 May - Thomas Jones organises an eisteddfod at the New Inn (modern-day Owain Glyndwr Hotel) in Corwen, where for the first time the public are admitted.

=== New books ===
- Jenkin Lewis - Memoirs of Prince William Henry, Duke of Gloucester
- Iolo Morganwg - Barddoniaeth Dafydd ab Gwilym, incorporating probable forgeries by Morganwg
- Richard Price - Love for our Country

== Births ==
- 22 April - Richard Roberts, mechanical engineer and inventor (died 1864)
- 24 May - Betsi Cadwaladr, Crimea nurse (died 1860)

== Deaths ==
- 28 June - John Walters, priest and poet, 29
- 24 July - Sir Watkin Williams-Wynn, 4th Baronet, politician, 39
- 7 August - William Edwards, minister and bridge-builder, 70
- 26 November - Elizabeth Baker, diarist, 70?
