= 1777 in Wales =

- Centuries: 16th; 17th; 18th; 19th; 20th
- Decades: 1750s; 1760s; 1770s; 1780s; 1790s
- See also: List of years in Wales; Timeline of Welsh history 1777 in Great Britain Scotland Elsewhere

This article is about the particular significance of the year 1777 to Wales and its people.

== Incumbents ==
- Lord Lieutenant of Anglesey - Sir Nicholas Bayly, 2nd Baronet
- Lord Lieutenant of Brecknockshire and Monmouthshire – Charles Morgan of Dderw
- Lord Lieutenant of Caernarvonshire - Thomas Wynn
- Lord Lieutenant of Cardiganshire – Wilmot Vaughan, 1st Earl of Lisburne
- Lord Lieutenant of Carmarthenshire – George Rice
- Lord Lieutenant of Denbighshire - Richard Myddelton
- Lord Lieutenant of Flintshire - Sir Roger Mostyn, 5th Baronet
- Lord Lieutenant of Glamorgan – John Stuart, Lord Mountstuart
- Lord Lieutenant of Merionethshire - Sir Watkin Williams-Wynn, 4th Baronet (from 10 June)
- Lord Lieutenant of Montgomeryshire – George Herbert, 2nd Earl of Powis
- Lord Lieutenant of Pembrokeshire – Sir Hugh Owen, 5th Baronet
- Lord Lieutenant of Radnorshire – Edward Harley, 4th Earl of Oxford and Earl Mortimer
- Bishop of Bangor – John Moore
- Bishop of Llandaff – Shute Barrington
- Bishop of St Asaph – Jonathan Shipley
- Bishop of St Davids – James Yorke

== Events ==
- 1 March - David Samwell, at sea between New Zealand and Tahiti with Captain Cook, writes a pennillion.
- 22 July - The business partnership between Anthony Bacon and William Brownrigg is dissolved.
- Thomas Pennant marries, as his second wife, Anne Mostyn, daughter of Sir Thomas Mostyn, 4th Baronet.
- Francis Towne and John White go on a painting tour of North Wales.

== Arts and literature ==
=== New books ===
- Evan Hughes (Hughes Fawr) - Duwdod Crist
- Nicholas Owen - British Remains
- Thomas Pennant - British Zoology, vol. 4
- William Williams Pantycelyn - Ductor Naptiarum: Neu Gyfarwyddwr Priodas

=== Music ===
- Harpist Edward Jones performs at Covent Garden.

== Births ==
- 15 June - David Daniel Davis, royal obstetrician (died 1841)
- 29 August - John James, hymn-writer (died 1848)
- 15 September - John Jones of Ystrad, MP (died 1842)
- 7 November - Richard Bassett, Methodist minister (died 1852)
- date unknown
  - William Camden Edwards, engraver (died 1855)
  - Thomas Rees, Unitarian minister (died 1864)

== Deaths ==
- 4 March - Edward Richard, teacher and poet, 62
- 5 April - Thomas Lewis, politician, 86
- April - John Hodges, Methodist, 77
- 19 May - Button Gwinnett, American political leader of Welsh parentage, 41 (killed in duel)
- 28 June - Chase Price, lawyer and politician, 45/6
- 1 July - Sir John Glynne, 6th Baronet, 64
- 30 August - Dafydd Jones, hymn-writer, 66
- 18 December - William Lloyd, translator, 60
- 23 December - Thomas Farnolls Pritchard, architect who worked in the borders of Wales and England, about 54
