= 1790 in Wales =

- Centuries: 16th; 17th; 18th; 19th; 20th
- Decades: 1770s; 1780s; 1790s; 1800s; 1810s
- See also: List of years in Wales; Timeline of Welsh history 1790 in Great Britain Scotland Elsewhere

This article is about the particular significance of the year 1790 to Wales and its people.

== Incumbents ==
- Lord Lieutenant of Anglesey - Henry Paget
- Lord Lieutenant of Brecknockshire and Monmouthshire – Henry Somerset, 5th Duke of Beaufort
- Lord Lieutenant of Caernarvonshire - Thomas Bulkeley, 7th Viscount Bulkeley
- Lord Lieutenant of Cardiganshire – Wilmot Vaughan, 1st Earl of Lisburne
- Lord Lieutenant of Carmarthenshire – John Vaughan
- Lord Lieutenant of Denbighshire - Richard Myddelton
- Lord Lieutenant of Flintshire - Sir Roger Mostyn, 5th Baronet
- Lord Lieutenant of Glamorgan – John Stuart, Lord Mountstuart
- Lord Lieutenant of Merionethshire - Watkin Williams
- Lord Lieutenant of Montgomeryshire – George Herbert, 2nd Earl of Powis
- Lord Lieutenant of Pembrokeshire – Richard Philipps, 1st Baron Milford
- Lord Lieutenant of Radnorshire – Edward Harley, 4th Earl of Oxford and Earl Mortimer (until 11 October)
- Bishop of Bangor – John Warren
- Bishop of Llandaff – Richard Watson
- Bishop of St Asaph – Samuel Hallifax (until 4 March); Lewis Bagot (from 28 April)
- Bishop of St Davids – Samuel Horsley

== Events ==
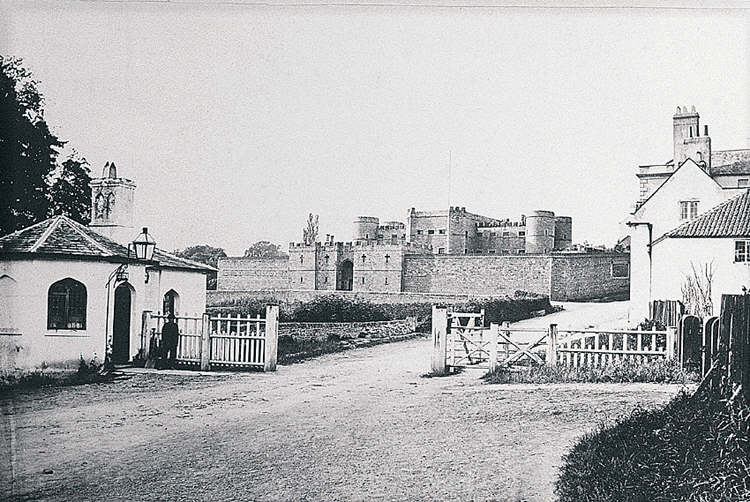
Monmouth County Gaol

- 18 May - The first meeting of the Literary Fund, founded by David Williams ("to assist indigent authors") takes place in London.
- 9 June - Royal assent is given to establishment of the port of Milford Haven.
- August - Construction of the Glamorganshire Canal begins.
- exact date unknown
  - Sir Herbert Mackworth gives up the Parliamentary seat of Cardiff when John Stuart, Lord Mount Stuart, comes of age.
  - The world's first railway viaduct (used by horse-drawn wagons to carry coal from the mines) is built at Blaenavon.
  - Monmouth County Gaol is built.
  - Calvinistic Methodist clergyman Thomas Charles of Bala attempts to preach at Corwen but is driven out of town by a mob.
  - John Coles, son of the founder of the Cambrian Pottery, goes into partnership with entrepreneur George Haynes, resulting in the expansion of the business.

== Arts and literature ==
=== New books ===
==== English language ====
- Thomas Pennant - Indian Zoology
- David Williams - Lessons to a Young Prince (published anonymously)

==== Welsh language ====
- Thomas Edwards (Twm o'r Nant) - Gardd o Gerddi
- Peter Williams - Tafol i Bwyso Sosiniaeth

== Births ==
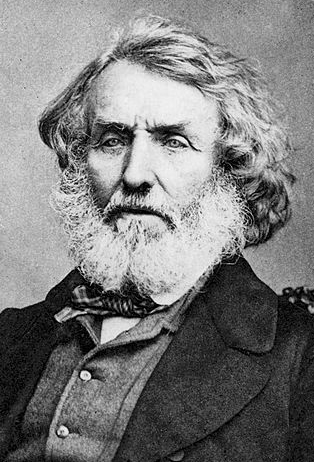
Sir George Everest

- 27 January - William Davies Evans, mariner and chess player (died 1872)
- 20 February (baptised) - Hugh Hughes, painter (died 1863)
- 19 June - John Gibson, sculptor (died 1866)
- July - James Williams, cleric and co-founder of the Anglesey Association of the Preservation of Lives from Shipwreck (died 1872)
- 4 July - George Everest, surveyor and geographer (died 1866)
- 11 August - William Probert, minister and author (died 1870)
- 16 September - Thomas Vowler Short, Bishop of St Asaph (died 1872)
- 27 September - Owen Jones Ellis Nanney (born Ellis Jones), MP (died 1870), father of Sir Hugh Ellis-Nanney
- 29 September - John Jones, printer (died 1855)
- 25 November - Sir James Hamlyn-Williams, 3rd Baronet, politician (died 1861)
- probable - Thomas Penson (the younger), architect and surveyor (died 1859)

== Deaths ==
- 4 March - Samuel Hallifax, Bishop of St Asaph, 57
- 20 March - Thomas Richards of Coychurch, cleric and lexicographer, 80
- 24 August - John Worgan, organist and composer, 66
- 11 October - Edward Harley, 4th Earl of Oxford and Earl Mortimer, Lord Lieutenant of Radnorshire, 64
- 16 October - Daniel Rowland, Methodist leader, c.79
- 5 November - Michael Lort, clergyman, academic and antiquary, 65
