= 1783 in Great Britain =

Events from the year 1783 in Great Britain. This year is notable for the conclusion of the American Revolution.

== Incumbents ==
- Monarch – George III
- Prime Minister – William Petty, 2nd Earl of Shelburne (Whig) (until 2 April); William Cavendish-Bentinck, 3rd Duke of Portland (Coalition) (starting 2 April, until 19 December); William Pitt the Younger (Tory) (starting 19 December)

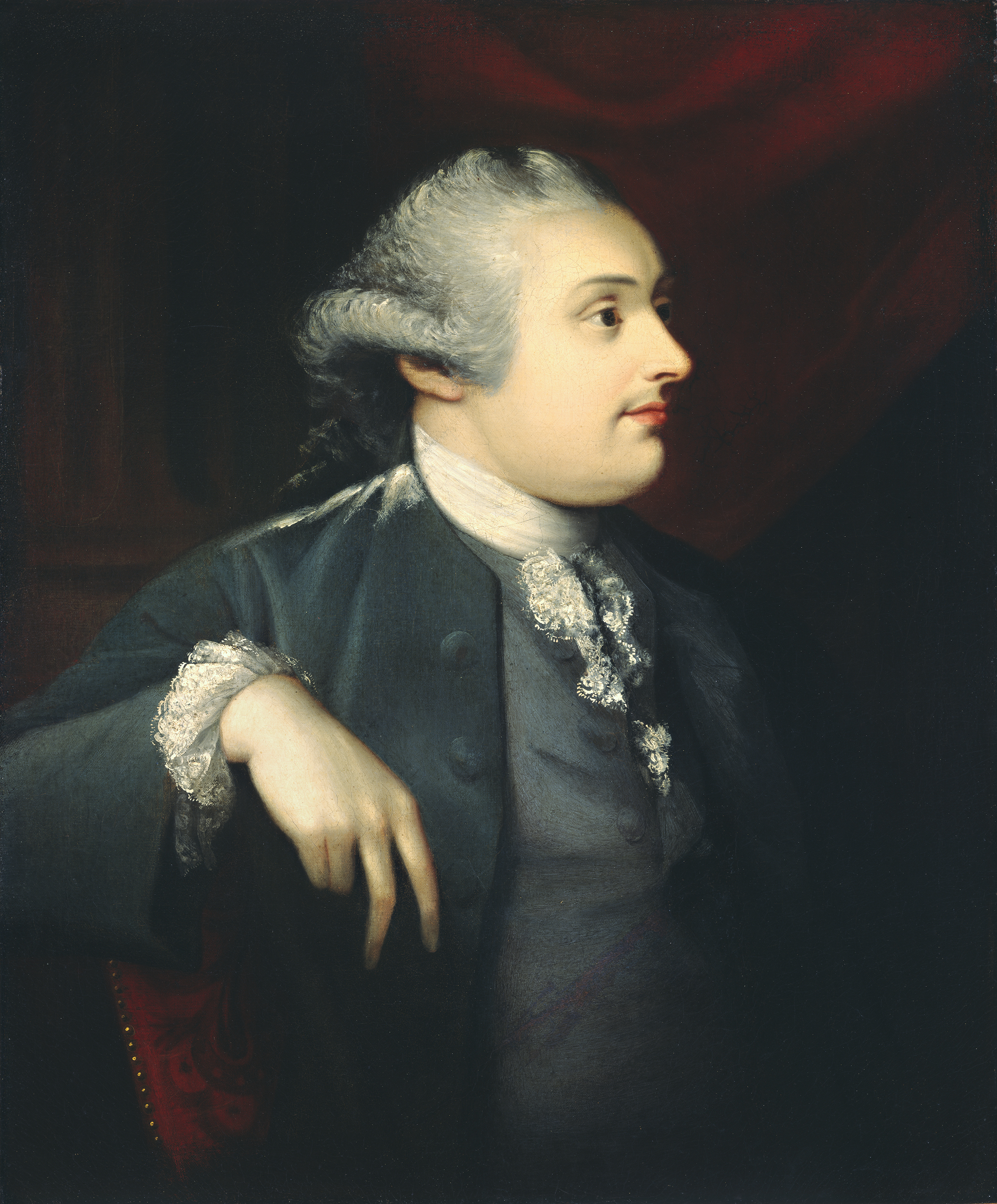
William Cavendish-Bentinck, 3rd Duke of Portland

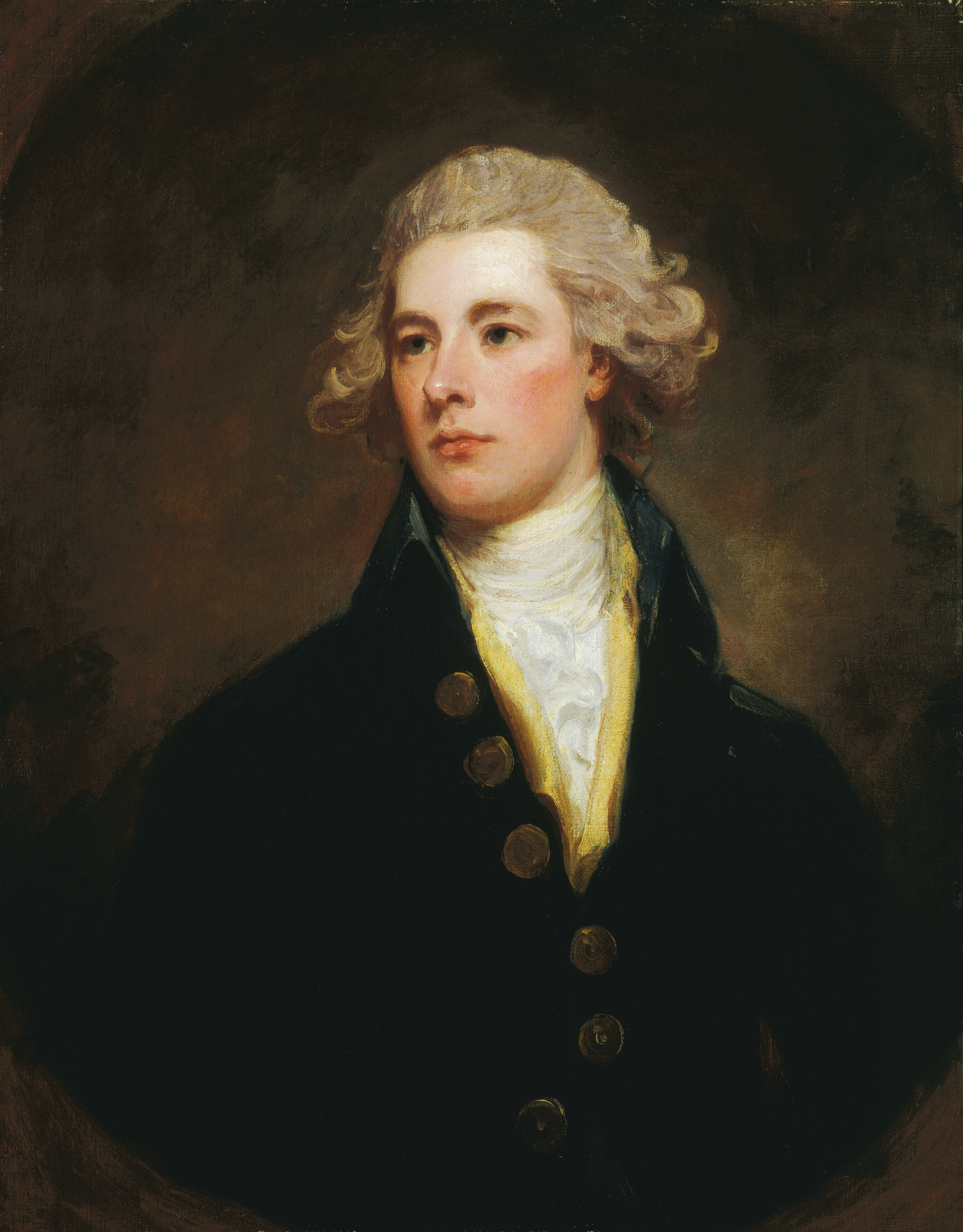
William Pitt the Younger

== Events ==
- 1 January – Glasgow Chamber of Commerce is founded by Patrick Colquhoun – the first in Britain.
- 20 January – Great Britain signs preliminary peace treaties with the Kingdoms of France and of Spain at Versailles.
- 27 January – The Herald newspaper begins publication as the weekly Glasgow Advertiser; it will become the longest continually-published daily in Britain.
- 3 February – American Revolutionary War: Great Britain acknowledges the independence of the United States of America.
- 4 February – American Revolutionary War: Great Britain formally declares that it will cease hostilities with the United States.
- 6 February – American Revolutionary War: Spain lifts the Great Siege of Gibraltar.
- 24 February – William Petty, 2nd Earl of Shelburne resigns as Prime Minister over the proposed peace terms with the United States.
- 19 March – Zong massacre: the case of a British slave trader who, in 1781, threw approximately 142 slaves overboard to conserve supplies for the remainder, the owners subsequently attempting to reclaim part of their value from insurers, is revealed by Olaudah Equiano to anti-slavery activist Granville Sharp, creating new support for abolitionism.
- 28 March – George III drafts a letter of abdication from the British throne.
- 2 April – Fox-North Coalition: William Cavendish-Bentinck, 3rd Duke of Portland becomes First Lord of the Treasury.
- 15 April – preliminary articles of peace ending the American Revolutionary War are ratified by the Congress of the Confederation in the United States.
- May
  - George Crabbe's narrative poem The Village is published.
  - John Goodricke presents his conclusions that the variable star Algol is what comes to be known as an eclipsing binary to the Royal Society of London.
- 10 May – John Moore enthroned as Archbishop of Canterbury.
- 8 June – a sulphurous haze from the eruption of the Laki volcano in Iceland gives rise to the "sand-summer", thought to have caused the deaths of more than 10,000 people in Britain.
- 1–31 July – the hottest month in the CET series until July 1983 with a mean temperature of 18.8 °C (65.8 °F) features what is still the highest minimum daily CET for any month at 16.3 °C (61.3 °F).

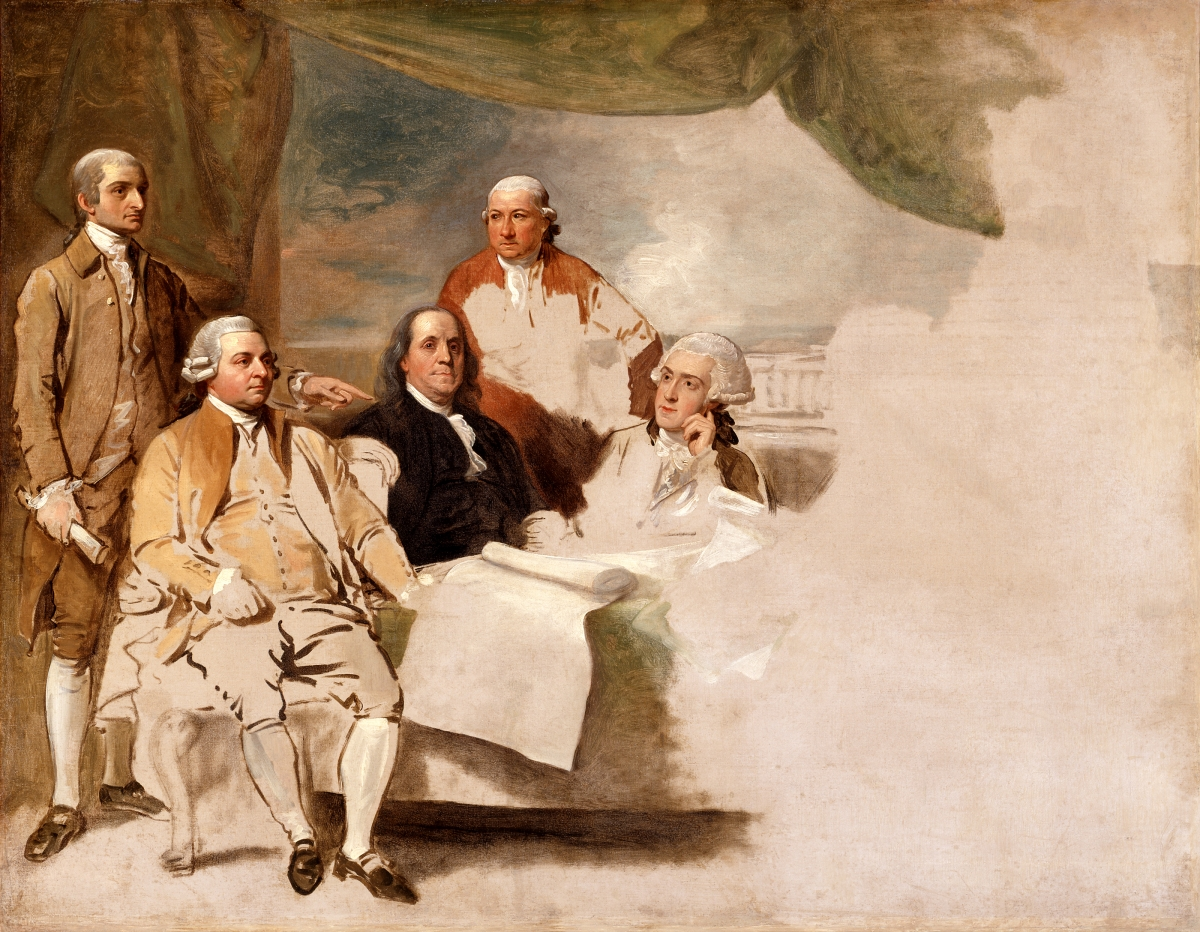
Treaty of Paris, by Benjamin West (1783), shows the American delegation at the 1783 Treaty of Paris. The British delegation refused to pose, so the painting remained incomplete

- 16 July – grants of land in Canada to United Empire Loyalists are announced.
- 18 August – Great Meteor passes over the east coast of Britain, sparking reports in the press and the Philosophical Transactions of the Royal Society.
- August – Robert Burns writes his poem "Now Westlin' Winds" or "Composed in August".
- 2 September – a preliminary treaty is signed in Paris with the Dutch Republic to end the Fourth Anglo-Dutch War.
- 3 September – Peace of Paris: The Treaty of Paris between Britain and the United States is signed, formally ending the American Revolutionary War and granting the United States independence from Great Britain; and treaties are signed between Britain, France and Spain at Versailles ending hostilities with the Franco-Spanish Alliance.
- 7 November – the last public execution at Tyburn, London, is held, of highwayman John Austin for murder.
- 25 November – American Revolutionary War: Evacuation Day (New York) – the last British troops leave New York City three months after the signing of the Treaty of Paris.
- 27 November – English rector John Michell concludes that some stars might have enough gravity force to prevent light escaping from them, so he calls them "dark stars".
- 9 December – executions begin to be held in Newgate Prison.
- 17 December – George III dismisses the Fox-North Coalition. It is succeeded by a government formed by William Pitt the Younger.
- 19 December – William Pitt the Younger becomes the youngest-ever Prime Minister of Great Britain or the United Kingdom at the age of 24.

== Undated ==
- Industrial Revolution: Henry Cort of Funtley, Hampshire, invents the grooved rolling mill for producing bar iron.
- Erasmus Darwin begins publication of A System of Vegetables, a translation of Linnaeus in which he coins many common English language names of plants.
- Publication of Domesday Book: The text of the Domesday Book (1086) is first published in print, under the editorship of Abraham Farley.
- The Countess of Huntingdon's Connexion is founded by Selina, Countess of Huntingdon, as part of the Evangelical Revival.

== Births ==
- 21 April – Reginald Heber, Anglican bishop, poet and hymn writer (died 1826)
- 29 April – David Cox, landscape painter (died 1859)
- 22 May
  - Joseph Brotherton, radical and pioneer vegetarian (died 1853)
  - William Sturgeon, scientist (died 1850)
- 9 June – Benjamin Collins Brodie, physiologist (died 1862)
- 19 June – Thomas Sully, English-born American portrait painter (died 1872)
- 7 August – Princess Amelia, member of the Royal Family (died 1810)
- 17 September – Samuel Prout, painter (died 1852)
- 23 September – Jane Taylor, poet and novelist (died 1824)
- 22 October – James Henry Keith Stewart, Member of Parliament (died 1836)
- 6 October – Thomas Attwood, economist and political reformer (died 1856)
- 18 December – Mary Anne Whitby, scientist (died 1850)

== Deaths ==
- 7 January – William Tans'ur, English hymnist (born 1700)
- 6 February – Capability Brown, landscape gardener (born 1716)
- 10 February – James Nares, composer (born 1715)
- 30 March – William Hunter, anatomist (born 1718)
- 18 September – Benjamin Kennicott, churchman and Hebrew scholar (born 1718)
- 16 December – William James, naval commander (born 1720)

== See also ==
- 1783 in Wales
