= 1785 in Scotland =

- Centuries: 16th; 17th; 18th; 19th; 20th
- Decades: 1760s; 1770s; 1780s; 1790s; 1800s
- See also: List of years in Scotland; Timeline of Scottish history 1785 in: Great Britain • Wales • Elsewhere

Events from the year 1785 in Scotland.

== Incumbents ==
=== Law officers ===
- Lord Advocate – Ilay Campbell
- Solicitor General for Scotland – Robert Dundas of Arniston

=== Judiciary ===
- Lord President of the Court of Session – Lord Arniston, the younger
- Lord Justice General – The Viscount Stormont
- Lord Justice Clerk – Lord Barskimming

== Events ==
- 7 March – geologist James Hutton proposes the theory of uniformitarianism to the Royal Society of Edinburgh.
- Late September – James Boswell’s The Journal of a Tour to the Hebrides is published.
- 5 October – flight by Florentine aeronaut Vincenzo Lunardi in a gas balloon from George Heriot's School, Edinburgh, across the Firth of Forth to Ceres, Fife (32 mi (51.5 km) in 1.5 hrs).
- 23 November – Lunardi flies from St Andrew's Square, Glasgow, to Hawick.

== Births ==
- 18 May – John Wilson, writer (died 1854)
- 18 November – David Wilkie, painter (died at sea 1841)

== Deaths ==
- 23 January – Matthew Stewart, mathematician (born 1717)
- 4 October – Alexander Runciman, painter (born 1736)
- 23 October – William Cochran, painter (born 1738)

== The arts ==
- 22 May – Robert Burns' first child, Elizabeth ("Dear-bought Bess"), is born to his mother's servant, Elizabeth Paton and his poems "To a Mouse" and "Halloween" are written.
