= 1784 in Great Britain =

Events from the year 1784 in Great Britain.

== Incumbents ==
- Monarch – George III
- Prime Minister – William Pitt the Younger (Tory)

== Events ==
- 15 January – Henry Cavendish's paper Experiments on Air reveals the composition of water.
- 28 February – John Wesley charters the Methodist Church.
- 8 March – Mary Bailey, a mariticide, becomes one of the last persons in Britain, convicted of murder, to be sentenced to be hanged, and their body burned. She and John Quin, accused of murdering Cornelius Bailey at Portsmouth, are both convicted and hanged at Winchester; Bailey claims her innocence to the end. After execution, Quin's body is handed to the surgeons for dissection, and Mary Bailey's body burned.
- 15 April – general election won by William Pitt the Younger's Tory Party.
- 20 May – a treaty is signed in Paris with the Dutch Republic formally ending the Fourth Anglo-Dutch War.
- 21 June – Commutation Act reduces duties on spirits and tea, and implements window tax.
- 1 August – the beginning of the driest twelve months in England and Wales for which reliable records exist – the England and Wales Precipitation totalled just 522.0 millimetres or 20.55 inches – with a second successive extended, cold and dry winter from October to March
- 2 August – the first mail coach runs between Bristol and London.
- 13 August – Parliament passes Pitt's India Act (An Act for the better Regulation and Management of the Affairs of the East India Company and of the British Possessions in India). It requires the governor-general to be chosen from outside the Company and makes company directors subject to parliamentary supervision.
- 16 August – Britain creates the colony of New Brunswick in Canada.
- 21 August – Joseph Bramah receives his first lock patent.
- 25 & 27 August – Scottish apothecary James Tytler makes the first balloon ascents in Britain, in a hot air balloon from Edinburgh.
- 15 September – the Italian Vincenzo Lunardi makes the first hydrogen balloon flight in Britain, from Moorfields in London to South Mimms.
- 4 October – the Englishman James Sadler makes the first hot air balloon flight in England, from Oxford to Woodeaton.
- 14 November - Consecration of Samuel Seabury as the First Bishop to the Free and Independent America by three Scottish Bishops in Aberdeen.

=== Undated ===
- Britain receives its first bales of cotton imported from the United States.
- Brick tax introduced.
- Industrial Revolution: Henry Cort of Funtley, Hampshire, applies the coal-fired reverbatory furnace to the puddling process for conversion of cast to wrought iron and Edmund Cartwright designs his first power loom.
- Publication of the Annals of Agriculture edited by Arthur Young begins.
- Two long, severe winters following the eruption of the Laki volcano in Iceland produce the coldest weather since 1740 and eighth-coldest calendar year (mean Central England temperature 7.82 °C or 46.08 °F) for which reliable records exist – this despite May 1784 being among the ten hottest in that record.

== Births ==
- 28 January – George Hamilton Gordon, 4th Earl of Aberdeen, Prime Minister (died 1860)
- 31 January – Bernard Barton, Quaker poet (died 1849)
- 12 March – William Buckland, geologist, palaeontologist and theologian (died 1856)
- 25 May – John Frost, Welsh-born Chartist leader (died 1877)
- 17 June – Andrew Crosse, 'gentleman scientist', pioneer experimenter in electricity and poet (died 1855)
- 18 August – Robert Taylor, Radical and freethinker (died 1844)
- 25 September – Louisa Gurney Hoare, diarist and writer on education (died 1836)
- 19 October – Leigh Hunt, critic, essayist and poet (died 1859)
- 20 October – Henry John Temple, 3rd Viscount Palmerston, Prime Minister (died 1865)
- October – Sarah Biffen, painter (died 1850)
- Hyde Parker, Vice Admiral (died 1854)

== Deaths ==
- 4 March – Ann Cargill, opera singer, drowned in shipwreck (born 1760)
- 27 March – Ralph Bigland, officer of arms (born 1712)
- 31 March – Thomas Adam, clergyman and religious writer (born 1701)
- 10 August – Allan Ramsay, Scottish-born portrait painter (born 1713)
- 14 August – Nathaniel Hone, Irish-born portrait painter (born 1718)
- 5 September – Maria Linley, singer (born 1763)
- September – John Bennett, organist and composer (born c.1735)
- 13 December – Samuel Johnson, writer and lexicographer (born 1709)

== See also ==
- 1784 in Wales
