= 1777 in Great Britain =

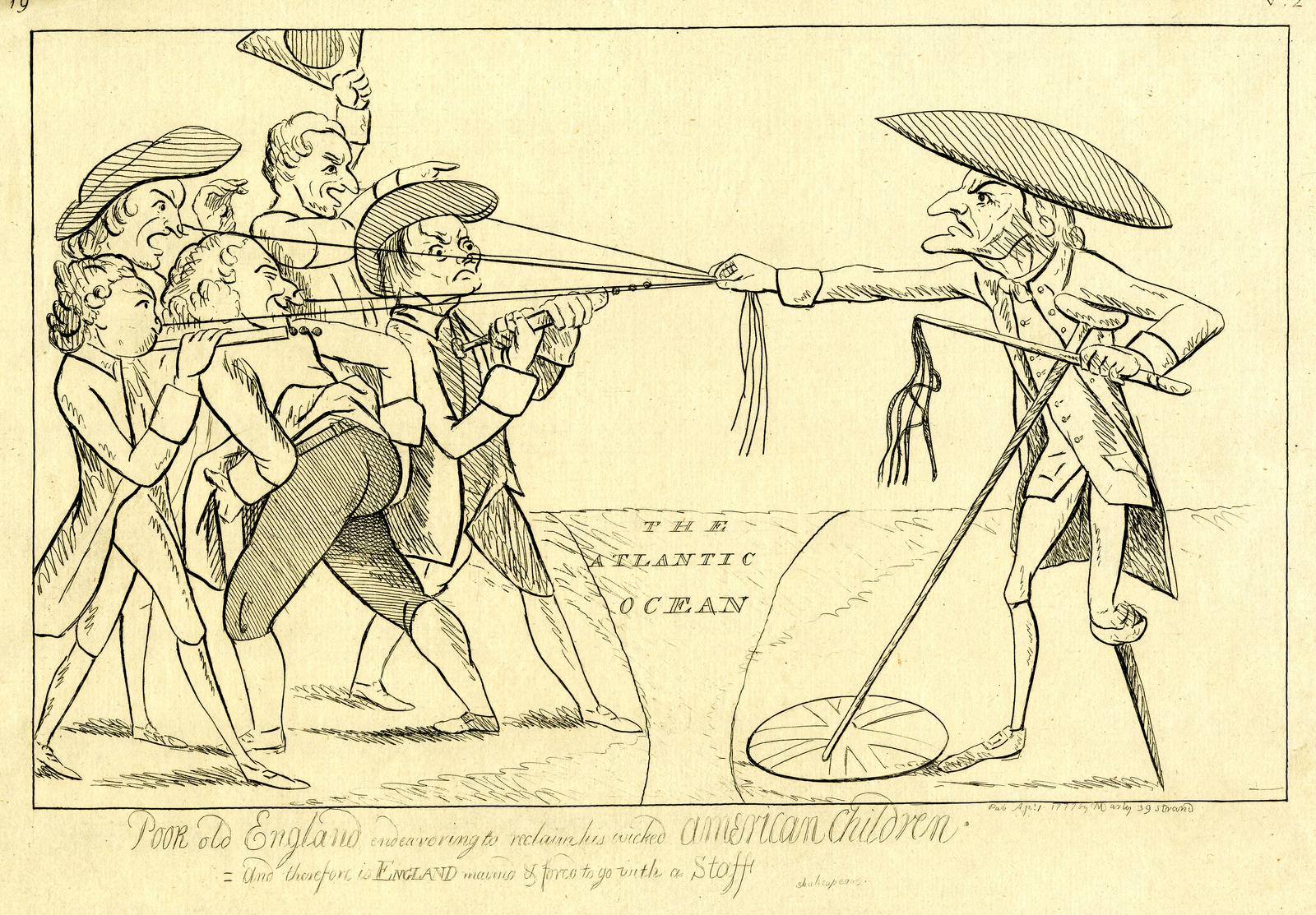
Political cartoon etching depicting an elderly England attempting to control his American children

Events from the year 1777 in Great Britain.

== Incumbents ==
- Monarch – George III
- Prime Minister – Frederick North, Lord North (Tory)

== Events ==
- 3 January – American Revolution: American general George Washington defeats British general Charles Cornwallis at the Battle of Princeton.
- 1 May – legal case of Goodright v. Stevens decides that the declaration of either parent cannot be accepted to prove that a child born in wedlock is a bastard.
- 8 May – first performance of Richard Brinsley Sheridan's comedy of manners The School for Scandal at the Theatre Royal, Drury Lane in London.
- May – completion of the Trent and Mersey Canal.
- 21 July – Holmfirth Flood in the Holme Valley of West Yorkshire: three drowned.
- 16 August – American Revolution: at the Battle of Bennington British and Brunswicker forces are decisively defeated by American troops.
- 8 September – inauguration of Bath and West of England Society for the Encouragement of Agriculture, Arts, Manufactures and Commerce.
- 11 September – American Revolution: Battle of Brandywine is a major victory for the British in Chester County, Pennsylvania.
- 19 September – American Revolution: First Saratoga: Battle of Freeman's Farm – British forces under General Burgoyne win the field but with serious casualties
- 4 October – American Revolution: at the Battle of Germantown, troops under George Washington are repelled by British troops under Sir William Howe.
- 7 October – American Revolution: Second Saratoga: Battle of Bemis Heights – the Americans are victorious.
- 17 October – American Revolution: Saratoga campaign ends with Burgoyne's surrender to the Americans.
- 24 December – Kiritimati (Christmas Island) visited by James Cook.
- Undated – William Bass establishes the Bass Brewery at Burton upon Trent.

== Publications ==
- Encyclopædia Britannica Second Edition begins publication.
- Laws Respecting Women, as they Regard Their Natural Rights is published by Joseph Johnson.
- John Howard's study The State of the Prisons in England and Wales.
- Clara Reeve’s Gothic novel The Champion of Virtue (anonymously), later known as The Old English Baron.

== Births ==
- 22 January – Joseph Hume, doctor and politician (died 1855)
- 3 February – John Cheyne, physician (died 1836)
- 16 February – Benjamin D'Urban, general and colonial administrator (died 1849)
- 1 April – William Gell, archaeologist (died 1836)
- 24 June – John Ross, Arctic explorer (died 1856)
- 9 July – Henry Hallam, historian (died 1859)
- 3 November – Princess Sophia, fifth daughter of King George III (died 1848)

== Deaths ==
- 12 January – Hugh Mercer, soldier and physician, dies in Princeton, New Jersey, United States (born 1726)
- 11 May – George Pigot, Baron Pigot, governor of Madras (born 1719)
- 19 or 27 May – Button Gwinnett, 2nd Governor of Georgia, dies near Savannah, Georgia, United States (born 1735)
- 27 July – William Hayes, composer (bapt. 1708)
- 7 October – Simon Fraser, general (born 1729)
- 21 October – Samuel Foote, dramatist and actor (born 1720)
- 26 December – Dolly Pentreath, last-known fluent native speaker of the Cornish language (born 1692)

== See also ==
- 1777 in Wales
