= 1780 in Great Britain =

Events from the year 1780 in Great Britain.

== Incumbents ==
- Monarch – George III
- Prime Minister – Frederick North, Lord North (Tory)

== Events ==
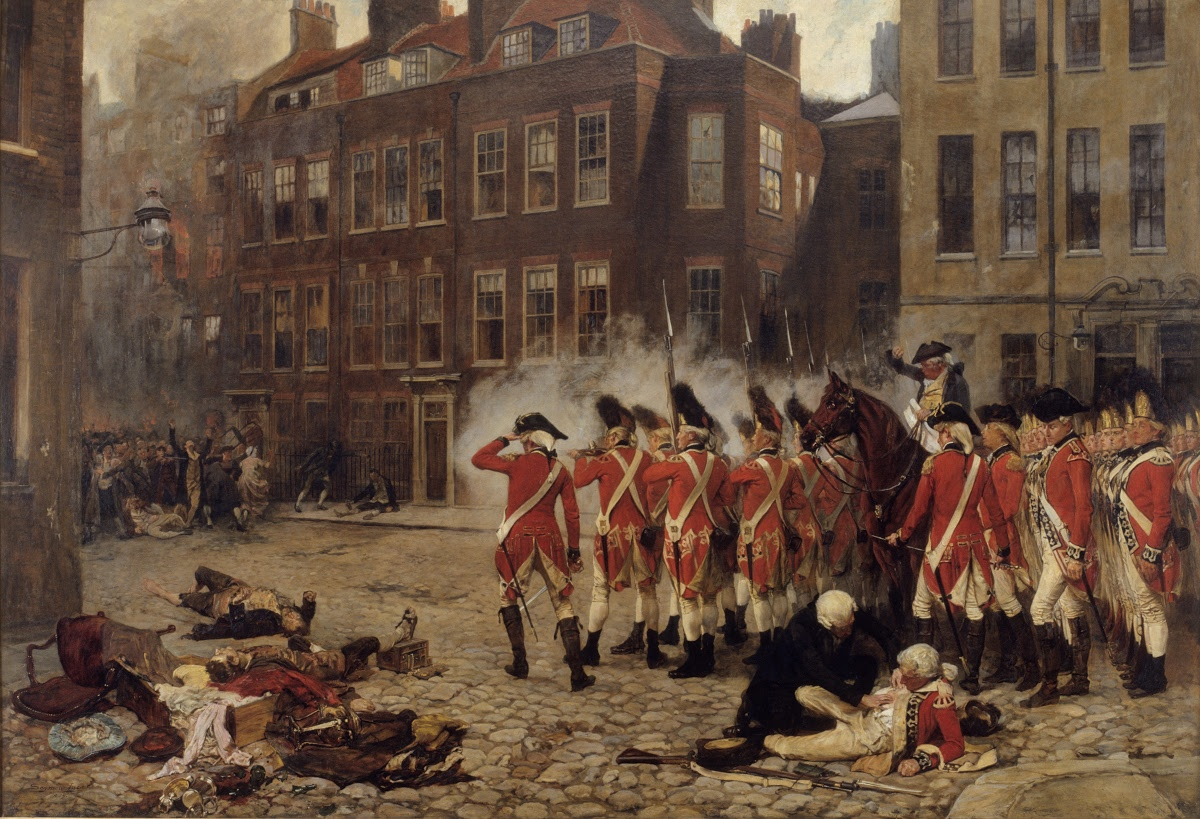
The Gordon Riots took place for a week in June. The Gordon Riots by John Seymour Lucas

- 16 January – American Revolutionary War: British naval victory at the Battle of Cape St. Vincent led by Admiral Sir George Rodney over a Spanish squadron. The future William IV is present as a midshipman.
- 8 March – American Revolutionary War: the League of Armed Neutrality is formed by Russia with Denmark and Sweden to try to prevent the Royal Navy from searching neutral vessels for contraband.
- 17 March – American Revolutionary War: the British San Juan Expedition sails from Jamaica under the command of Captains John Polson and Horatio Nelson to attack the Captaincy General of Guatemala (modern-day Nicaragua) in New Spain.
- 26 March – the British Gazette and Sunday Monitor, the first Sunday newspaper in Britain, begins publication.
- 29 April – American Revolutionary War: the Spanish commander of the Fortress of the Immaculate Conception on the San Juan River in modern-day Nicaragua surrenders it to the San Juan Expedition.
- 4 May – the first Epsom Derby horse race is run on Epsom Downs, Surrey. The victor is Diomed.
- 12 May – American Revolutionary War: Charleston, South Carolina is taken by British forces.
- 2 June – an Anti-Catholic mob led by Lord George Gordon marches on Parliament leading to the outbreak of the Gordon Riots in London.
- 7 June – the Gordon Riots are ended by the intervention of troops. About 285 people are shot dead, with another 200 wounded and around 450 arrested, of whom around 25 will be executed.
- July – Robert Raikes initiates a Sunday school movement, in Gloucester.
- 10 July – American Revolutionary War: 6,000 French troops led by Jean-Baptiste Donatien de Vimeur, comte de Rochambeau land in Newport, Rhode Island but are pinned down by the British.
- September – outbreak of the Second Anglo-Mysore War in India.
- 9 August – American Revolutionary War: Spanish admiral Luis de Córdova y Córdova captures a British convoy totalling 55 vessels amongst Indiamen, frigates and other cargo ships off Cape St. Vincent.
- 16 August – American Revolutionary War: Battle of Camden – the British defeat the Americans near Camden, South Carolina.
- 6 September–18 October – 1780 British general election. Lord North continues as prime minister with a reduced majority.
- 2 October – American Revolutionary War: British spy John André is hanged by American forces.
- 7 October – American Revolutionary War: Patriot militia defeat the Loyalist militia at the Battle of Kings Mountain.
- 9–20 October – Great Hurricane of 1780 in the Caribbean: At least a dozen ships of the Royal Navy, stationed in the area because of the American Revolutionary War, are totally lost, many with all (or most) hands, and others damaged; hundreds of sailors are killed.
- 20 November – American Revolutionary War: Britain declares war on the Dutch Republic to stop it from joining the League of Armed Neutrality.
- 30 November – American Revolutionary War: The San Juan Expedition is forced to withdraw.
- 20 December – Fourth Anglo-Dutch War breaks out.

=== Undated ===
- The Duke of Richmond calls, in the House of Lords, for manhood suffrage and annual parliaments, which are rejected.
- William Cavendish, 5th Duke of Devonshire, begins development of Buxton Crescent and the Great Stables to promote Buxton in the Derbyshire Peak District as a spa resort.
- The market town of Middleton, Dorset, is demolished by order of the landowner, Joseph Damer, Lord Milton, and the population moved to a new model village, Milton Abbas.
- Cherhill White Horse cut in Wiltshire.
- The original Craven Cottage is built by William Craven, 6th Baron Craven, in London.

== Births ==
- 25 January – Benjamin Lewis Vulliamy, clockmaker (died 1854)
- 25 February – John Bird Sumner, Archbishop of Canterbury (died 1862)
- 12 March – William Clowes, founder of Primitive Methodism (died 1851)
- 17 March – Thomas Chalmers, church minister (died 1847)
- 19 March – William Charles Ellis, physician specialising in mental illness (died 1839)
- 20 May – Lord Charles Bentinck, politician and ancestor of Queen Elizabeth II (died 1826)
- 21 May – Elizabeth Fry, humanitarian (died 1845)
- 31 May – Thomas Calley, politician (died 1863)
- 22 September – Prince Alfred of Great Britain, royal prince (died 1782)
- 24 December – Edmund Buckley, politician (died 1867)
- 26 December – Mary Somerville, née Fairfax, Scottish-born mathematician (died 1872)
- Elizabeth Philpot, paleontologist (died 1857)

== Deaths ==
- 14 February – William Blackstone, jurist (born 1723)
- 12 May – Herod, racehorse (born 1758)
- 18 May – Charles Hardy, governor of Newfoundland (born c. 1714)
- 3 June – Thomas Hutchinson, American-born last governor of Massachusetts Bay Colony (born 1711)
- 4 September – John Fielding, magistrate and social reformer (born 1721)
- 2 October – John André, British Army officer of the American Revolutionary War (executed) (born 1750)
- 17 October – William Cookworthy, chemist (born 1705)
- 26 November – Sir James Denham Steuart, 4th Baronet, economist (born 1712)
- 14 December – Ignatius Sancho, composer, actor, writer and abolitionist (born c. 1729 on a slave ship)
- 26 December – John Fothergill, physician (born 1712)
- date unknown – Thomas Dilworth, cleric and writer (year of birth unknown)

== See also ==
- 1780 in Wales
