= John Butler (bishop) =

English bishop and controversialist

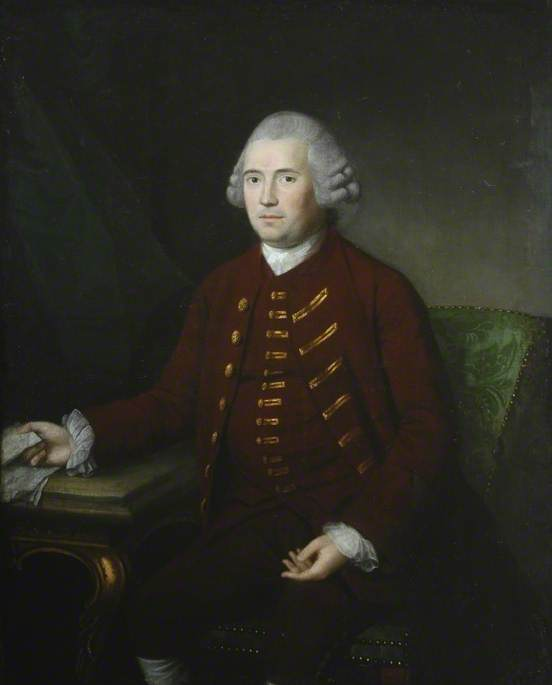
Bishop John Butler (1717–1802), painting by Thomas Hudson

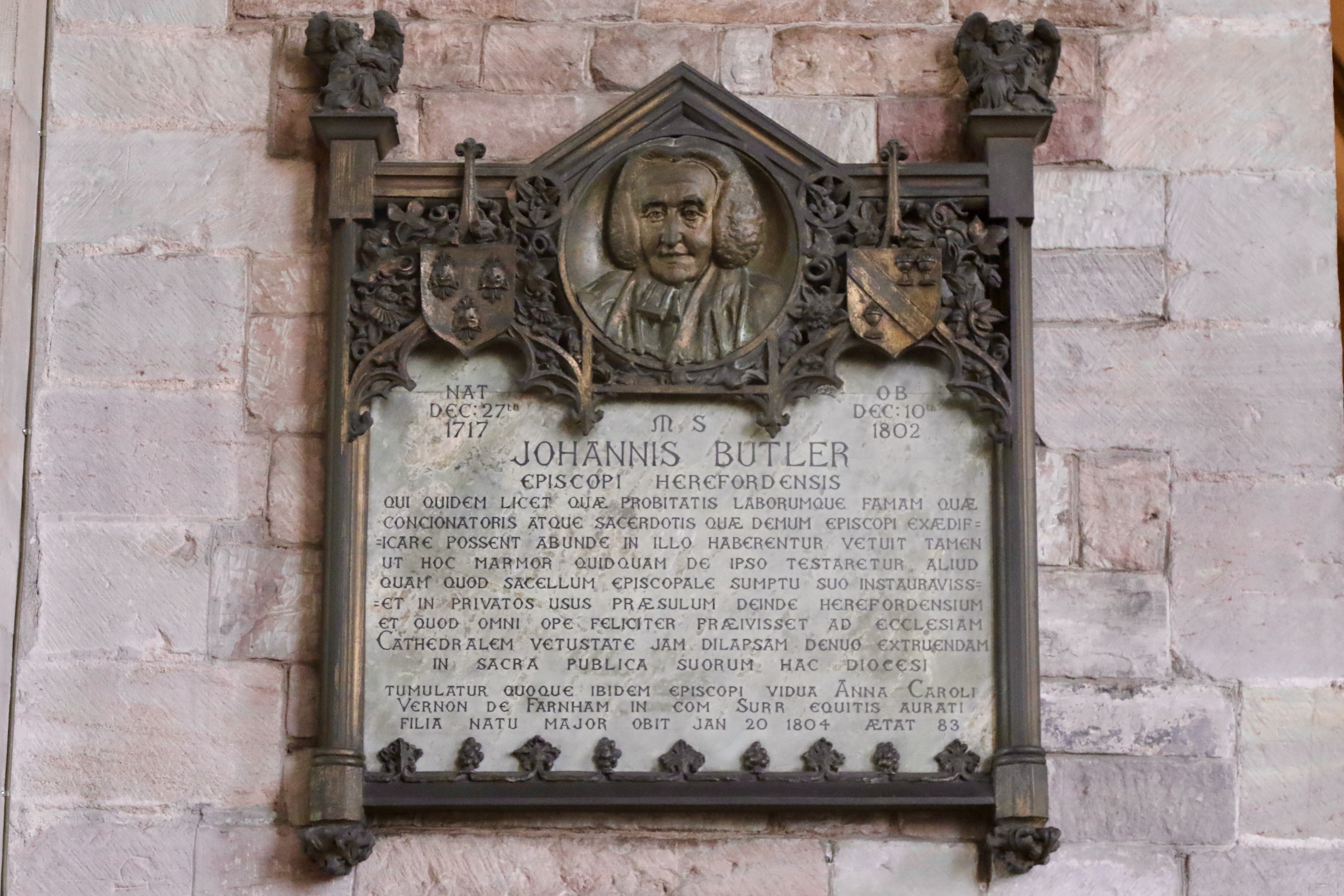
Memorial in Hereford Cathedral

John Butler (1717 – 10 December 1802) was an English bishop and controversialist.

== Life ==
Butler was born at Hamburg. As a young man he was a tutor in the family of Mr Child, a banker. He matriculated from University College, Oxford, on 10 May 1733, and graduated BCL in 1746 and DCL in 1752.

He married first a lady who kept a school at Westminster; his second wife was the sister and coheiress of Sir Charles Vernon, of Farnham, Surrey, and this marriage improved his social standing. Having taken orders, he became a popular preacher in London, and in 1754 he published a sermon, preached at St Paul's Cathedral before the Sons of the Clergy. In the title-page, he is described as chaplain to the Princess Dowager of Wales. In the same year, he also published a sermon preached before the trustees of the Public Infirmary. He was installed as a prebendary of Winchester in 1760. In the title-page of a sermon preached before the House of Commons at St. Margaret's, Westminster, on the occasion of a general fast in 1758, he is described as minister of Great Yarmouth and chaplain to the Princess Dowager.

Despite this relationship to the princess's household, in 1762 he issued a political pamphlet addressed to the 'Cocoa Tree' (the Cocoa Tree Club was associated with the Tories) and signed 'A Whig.' In this pamphlet, which ran to three editions, he bitterly attacked John Stuart, 3rd Earl of Bute and the conduct of his ministry since the accession of George III. He was appointed chaplain to Thomas Hayter, received the living of Everley, Wiltshire, and on the recommendation of Arthur Onslow was made one of the king's chaplains. In 1769 he was made archdeacon of Surrey.

During the American War of Independence he issued a number of political pamphlets, under the signature of 'Vindex,' in which he strongly supported the policy of Lord North. In 1777, he was appointed Bishop of Oxford, being consecrated at Lambeth on 25 May. Butler had now adopted strong Tory principles, and on 30 January 1787 preached before the House of Lords about the death of Charles I. While bishop of Oxford he helped Carl Gottfried Woide to transcribe the Codex Alexandrinus.

In 1788, he was translated to the bishopric of Hereford. In 1786, a great fire burnt down the medieval west end of the cathedral nave; Butler was responsible for a fore-shortened modern reconstruction. He also installed a private chapel for the bishop's entourage in the palace, which is adjoined by the cloisters to the cathedral. He died in 1802, in his eighty-fifth year, leaving no children.

== Works ==
His published works are:

- An Answer to the Cocoa Tree, by a Whig, 1762.
- A Consultation on the Subject of a Standing Army, 1763.
- Serious Consideration on the Character of the Present Administration.
- Account of the Character of the Rt. Hon. H. B. Legge.
- Sermons and charges of various dates, republished in a collective edition, 1801.

== Notes ==
Church of England titles
Preceded by Robert Lowth	Bishop of Oxford; 1777–1788	Succeeded by Edward Smallwell
Preceded by John Harley	Bishop of Hereford; 1788–1802	Succeeded by Folliot Cornewall
