= 1778 in Great Britain =

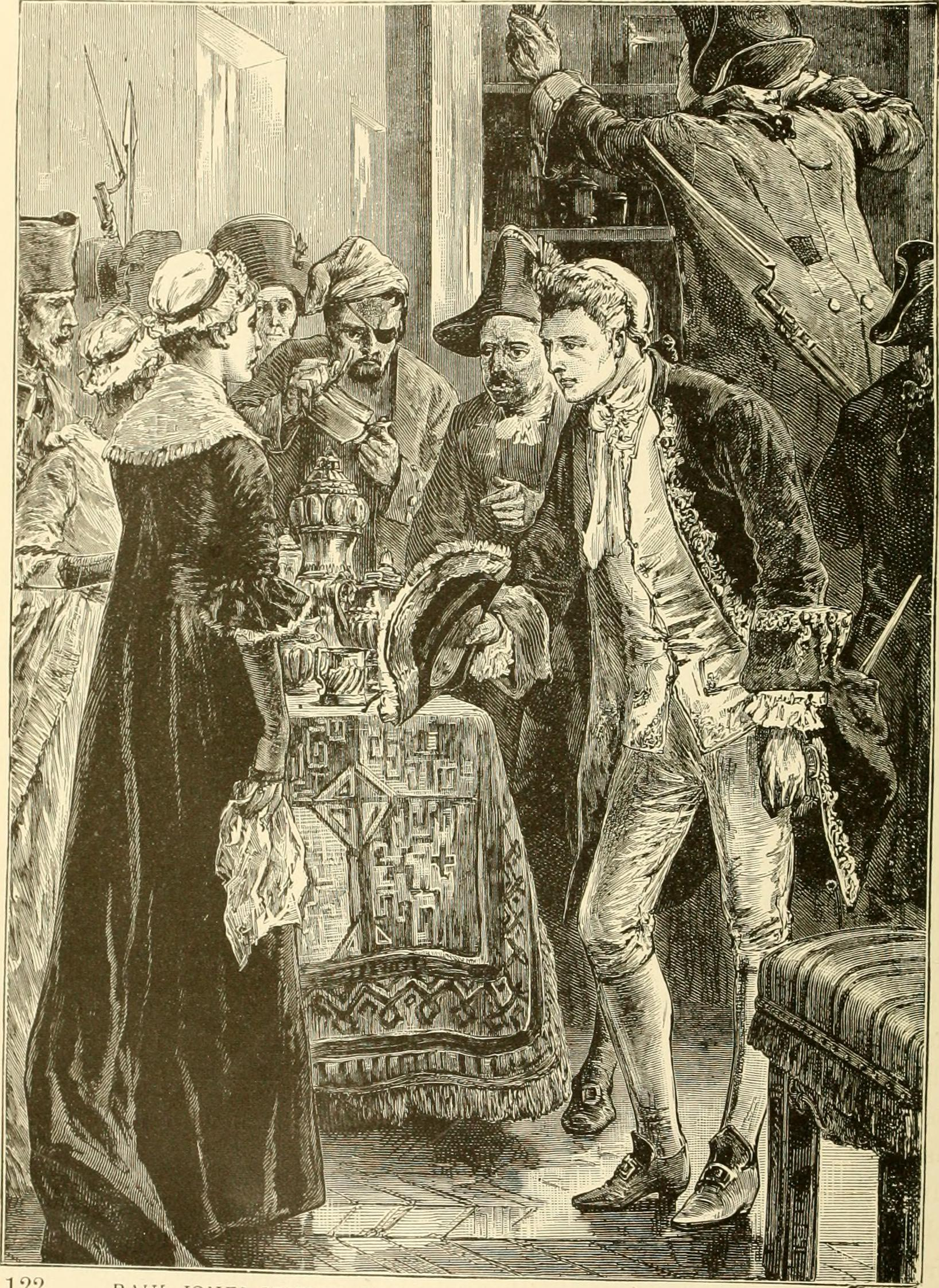
John Paul Jones seizes the Silver Plate of Lady Selkirk

Events from the year 1778 in Great Britain.

== Incumbents ==
- Monarch – George III
- Prime Minister – Frederick North, Lord North (Tory)

== Events ==
- 18 January – the third Pacific expedition of James Cook, with ships HMS Resolution (1771) and HMS Discovery (1774), first views Oahu then Kauai in the Hawaiian Islands, which he names the "Sandwich Islands".
- 6 February – American Revolutionary War: Britain declares war on France for aiding the Americans.
- 23 April – American Revolutionary War: John Paul Jones in USS Ranger (1777) raids Whitehaven, with limited effect.
- 24 April – American Revolutionary War: North Channel Naval Duel – John Paul Jones in USS Ranger captures HMS Drake (1777) in the North Channel.
- May – HMS Victory is commissioned and remains in active service for the following 32 years, most notably at the Battle of Trafalgar (1805).
- 28 May–11 November – American Revolutionary War: In response to the threat of invasion from France, major militia camps are set up at Coxheath Common in Kent and Warley Common near Brentwood, Essex. Coxheath Camp becomes a fashionable gathering for high society.
- 3 June – Papists Act is the first to provide a measure of Catholic relief.
- 13 June – American Revolutionary War: The Carlisle Peace Commission of British envoys arrive in York, Pennsylvania to present the Continental Congress with a peace plan, which Congress quickly rejects.
- 16 June – American Revolutionary War: Spain declares war on Britain.
- 28 June – American Revolutionary War: the Battle of Monmouth in Monmouth, New Jersey, ends inconclusively.
- 3 July – American Revolutionary War: the Wyoming Valley battle and massacre takes place near Wilkes-Barre, Pennsylvania, ending in a defeat of the local colonists.
- 10 July – American Revolutionary War: Louis XVI of France declares war on Great Britain.
- 27 July – American Revolutionary War: First Battle of Ushant – British and French fleets fight to a standoff.
- 7 September – American Revolutionary War: French invasion of Dominica captures the British fort there before the latter is aware that France has entered the war in the Franco-American alliance.
- 22 September – first St. Leger Stakes horse race held under this name and at its continuing location, Town Moor, Doncaster. The winner is Hollandoise.
- 26 November – in the Hawaiian Islands, James Cook becomes the first European to sight Maui.

=== Undated ===
- Lord Mansfield decides the landmark case of Da Costa v Jones in English contract law, in relation to the presumption of good faith.
- Joseph Bramah invents a type of flush toilet.
- Flint & Clark, the predecessors of Debenhams, begin trading as drapers in London; their successor will enter liquidation in 2020.
- Fanny Burney's novel Evelina published (anonymously).
- Thomas West's A Guide to the Lakes published.

=== Ongoing ===
- American Revolutionary War 1775–1783
- First Anglo-Maratha War 1777–1783

== Births ==
- 1 January – James Grant, major-general (died 1852)
- 4 January – John Manners, 5th Duke of Rutland (died 1857)
- 19 March – Edward Pakenham, general (died 1815)
- 10 April – William Hazlitt, essayist (died 1830)
- 6 May – Henry Phillpotts, Bishop of Exeter (died 1869)
- 18 May
  - Charles Vane, 3rd Marquess of Londonderry, politician (died 1854)
  - Andrew Ure, doctor and writer (died 1857)
- 7 June – Beau Brummell, arbiter of fashion (died 1840)
- 19 September – Henry Peter Brougham, Lord High Chancellor of Great Britain (died 1868)
- 25 November
  - Joseph Lancaster, Quaker educationist (died 1838 in the United States)
  - Mary Anne Schimmelpenninck, Christian writer (died 1856)
- 17 December – Humphry Davy, chemist (died 1829)
- 18 December – Joseph Grimaldi, clown (died 1837)

== Deaths ==
- 5 March – Thomas Augustine Arne, composer (born 1710)
- 22 April – James Hargreaves, weaver, carpenter, and inventor (born 1720)
- 11 May – William Pitt, 1st Earl of Chatham, Prime Minister of Great Britain (born 1708)
- 16 May – Robert Darcy, 4th Earl of Holderness, diplomat and politician (born 1718)
- 12 August – Peregrine Bertie, 3rd Duke of Ancaster and Kesteven, general and politician (born 1714)

== See also ==
- 1778 in Wales
