= David Parry (scholar) =

Welsh scholar (died 1714)

David Parry (1682? – December 1714) was a Welsh scholar and assistant to the naturalist Edward Lhuyd. He was Keeper of the Ashmolean Museum in Oxford from 1709 until his death in 1714.

== Life ==
Parry, who was born in Cardigan, Wales, in about 1682, was educated at the grammar school in Cardigan before coming to the attention of Edward Lhuyd in about 1695. Lhuyd took Parry on his travels in Wales, Ireland, Scotland, and Brittany. They were imprisoned as spies for a time in Brittany, but returned to Oxford in April 1701. Parry then matriculated that year at Jesus College, Oxford.

Edward Lhuyd's efforts to obtain a scholarship for Parry were, however, thwarted by John Wynne, one of the Fellows of the college. Parry obtained his Bachelor of Arts degree in 1705 and his Master of Arts degree in 1708, becoming the unpaid under-keeper of the Ashmolean Museum under Lhuyd. He succeeded Lhuyd as Keeper of the Ashmolean in 1709, still unpaid. He was regarded as capable but insufficiently hard-working: one report said that there was nobody more competent than Parry, "if he would set himself to work" and another said that Parry was "always in the tavern, guttling and guzzling". He died in December 1714, with it being said that he had "shortened his days" by being a "perfect sot".
