= 1785 in Great Britain =

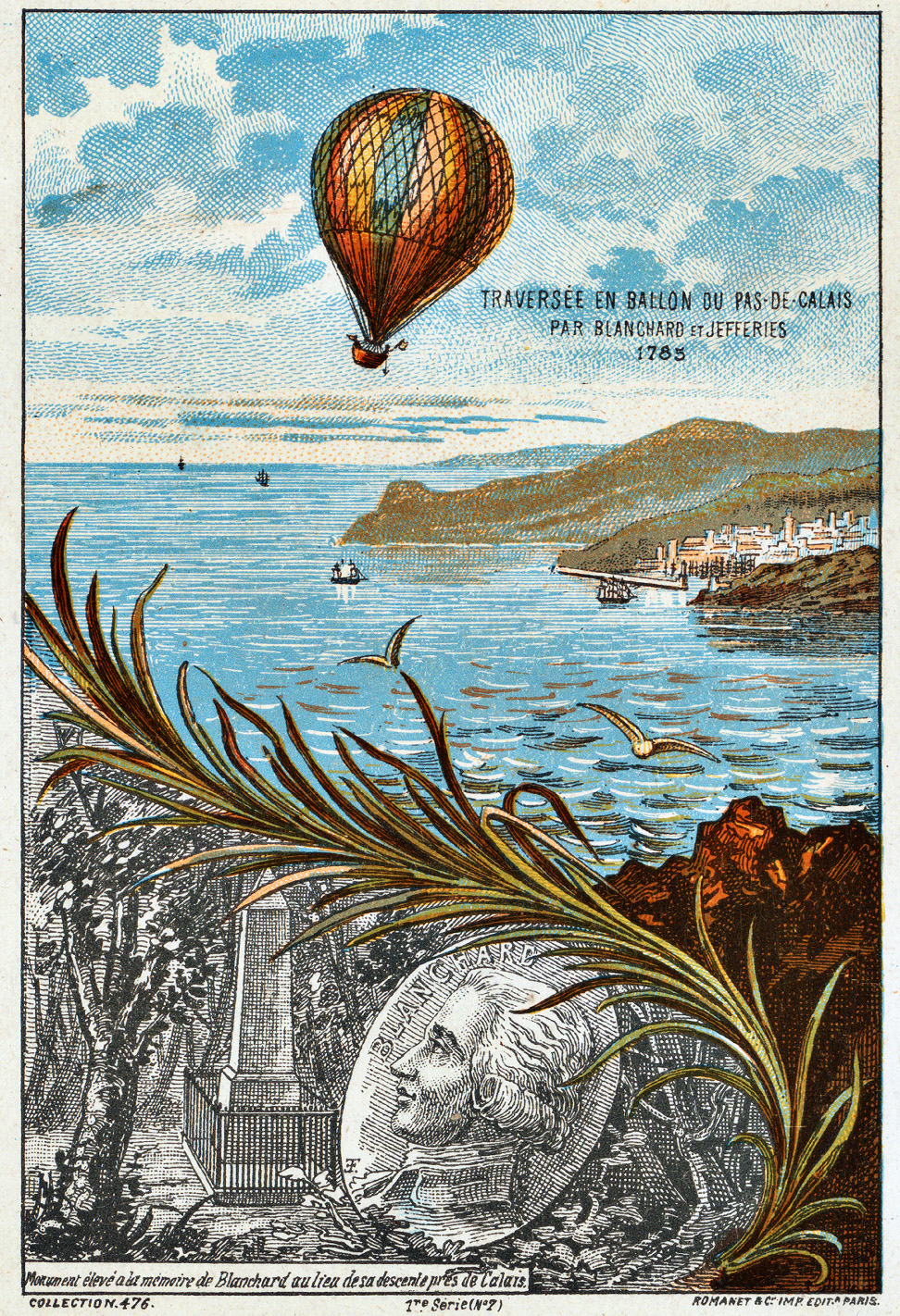
Balloon crossing of the Strait of Dover by Pierre Blanchard and John Jefferies (1785)

Events from the year 1785 in Great Britain.

== Incumbents ==
- Monarch – George III
- Prime Minister – William Pitt the Younger (Tory)

== Events ==
- 1 January – the first issue of the Daily Universal Register, later known as The Times, is published in London.
- 7 January – Frenchman Jean-Pierre Blanchard and American John Jeffries travel from Dover to Calais, France in a hydrogen gas balloon, becoming the first to cross the English Channel by air.
- 7 March – James Hutton proposes the theory of uniformitarianism to the Royal Society of Edinburgh.
- January to July – continuing an extremely dry and cold spell from the previous year, several records for dryness are set, among them driest twelve months in the England and Wales Precipitation series, with only 522.0 millimetres (20.55 in) for the year ending July 1785, and further records for dryness for periods of three to six months.
- 17 July – Fairfield Moravian Church is opened in Fairfield, Droylsden, Lancashire. With its surrounding settlement it has been founded by Benjamin La Trobe as a centre for evangelistic work for the Moravian Church in the Manchester area.
- 21 December – the Prince of Wales marries the widowed Catholic Maria Fitzherbert in her London home, secretly, and in contravention of the Royal Marriages Act 1772.

=== Undated ===
- The British government establishes a permanent land force in the Eastern Caribbean, based in Barbados
- William Pitt the Younger introduces a Reform Bill to Parliament to abolish the rotten boroughs, but it is defeated.
- Governor-General of India Warren Hastings charged with maladministration and returns to Britain.
- London Hospital Medical College opens as England's first chartered medical school.

== Publications ==
- James Boswell's The Journal of a Tour to the Hebrides.
- William Withering's An Account of the Foxglove and some of its Medical Uses, demonstrating the effects of digitalis.

== Births ==
- 30 January – Charles Metcalfe, 1st Baron Metcalfe, colonial administrator (died 1846)
- 22 March - Adam Sedgwick, geologist (died 1873)
- 18 May – John Wilson, writer (died 1854)
- 6 July – William Jackson Hooker, botanist (died 1865)
- 15 August – Thomas de Quincey, writer (died 1859)
- 18 October – Thomas Love Peacock, satirist (died 1866)
- 14 September – Nathaniel William Peach, politician (died 1835)
- 25 September – George Pinto, composer and keyboard virtuoso (died 1806)
- 18 November – David Wilkie, artist (died 1841)

== Deaths ==
- 19 January – Jonathan Toup, classical scholar and critic (born 1713)
- 23 January – Matthew Stewart, mathematician (born 1717)
- February – Peter the Wild Boy (born before 1725)
- 14 April – William Whitehead, writer (born 1715)
- 30 June – James Oglethorpe, English general and founder of the state of Georgia (born 1696)
- 26 August – George Germain, 1st Viscount Sackville, soldier and politician (born 1716)
- 25 November – Richard Glover, poet (born 1712)
- 6 December – Kitty Clive, actress (born 1711)

== See also ==
- 1785 in Wales
