= David Hughes (priest) =

Welsh Anglican priest and writer

David Hughes (1785 – 11 April 1850) was a Welsh Anglican priest and writer.

== Life ==
Hughes was born in 1785. He went to school in Ystrad Meurig, Wales before attending Jesus College, Oxford, where he obtained a Bachelor of Arts degree in 1806 and a Master of Arts degree in 1809. During his time at Oxford, he worked for the Oxford University Press, making corrections for the revised edition of the Welsh Bible that the Press published in 1809. He was ordained and, in 1808, was given a position in the parish of Hirnant, near Llangynog in Montgomeryshire. It appears that he never resided in the parish. He was a public examiner for the University of Oxford for 1810 to 1811, and was reputed to be a distinguished scholar and pious individual. He was appointed rector of Llanfyllin in 1813, and remained there until he died on 11 April 1850.
