= James Birch (sectary) =

James Birch (d. 1795?) was a Welsh sectary. He is believed to have been from the Pembrokeshire area, but to have moved to London as a young man to work as a watchmaker. He is associated initially with the Muggletonian sect, with his wife, in their records in July 1759. From 1771 he is known to have subscribed to 'The Saint's Triumph, and the Devil's Downfall', written by Muggletonian John Brown.

In 1778 however, he controversially claimed God had spoken directly to him, and to be the new prophet of the movement. He was denounced by other members of the sect, and forced to separate. He founded his own sect, the ‘Birchites’ in 1778, with followers in London and Pembrokeshire.

His writings include, 'The book of cherubical reason, with its law and nature, or, and 'The Book upon the Gospel and Regeneration'.

He died in London sometime in the late 1790s.
