= William Wynn (poet) =

Welsh poet

William Wynn (19 March 1709 (baptised) – 18 January 1760) was a Welsh Anglican priest and a poet (who wrote in Welsh).

== Life ==
Wynn was baptised on 19 March 1709. His parents were both from the Welsh county of Merioneth, and his father and grandfather were patrons of Welsh poets. He was educated at Jesus College, Oxford, matriculating in 1727 and graduating with a Bachelor of Arts degree in 1730 and a Master of Arts degree in 1735. He was ordained and served the parish of Watlington, Oxfordshire from 1734 to 1739, when he was appointed vicar of Llanbrynmair, Montgomeryshire. In 1747, he became rector of Manafon, Montgomeryshire, also becoming the parish priest of Llangynhafal, Denbighshire in 1749, where he died on 18 January 1760.

== Works ==
Wynn's earliest poem was written whilst he was a student at Oxford, in 1733, and he wrote further poems between then and 1738, including poems to members of the royal family. A printed copy of one of these poems were given to the Welsh antiquarian and poet Lewis Morris in 1737, Morris and Lewes being regular correspondents after that time (if they were not already), each sending copies of poems that they had written to the other. Wynn wrote few other poems, but his other work included a poem to Morris himself (1744), poems on the subject of the day of judgment and a yacht owned by William Vaughan (1755) and some carols. He owned various Welsh-language manuscripts and was known to be a scholar, leading to his becoming a member of the Honourable Society of Cymmrodorion soon after 1751.
