= William Howels =

Welsh priest (1778–1832)

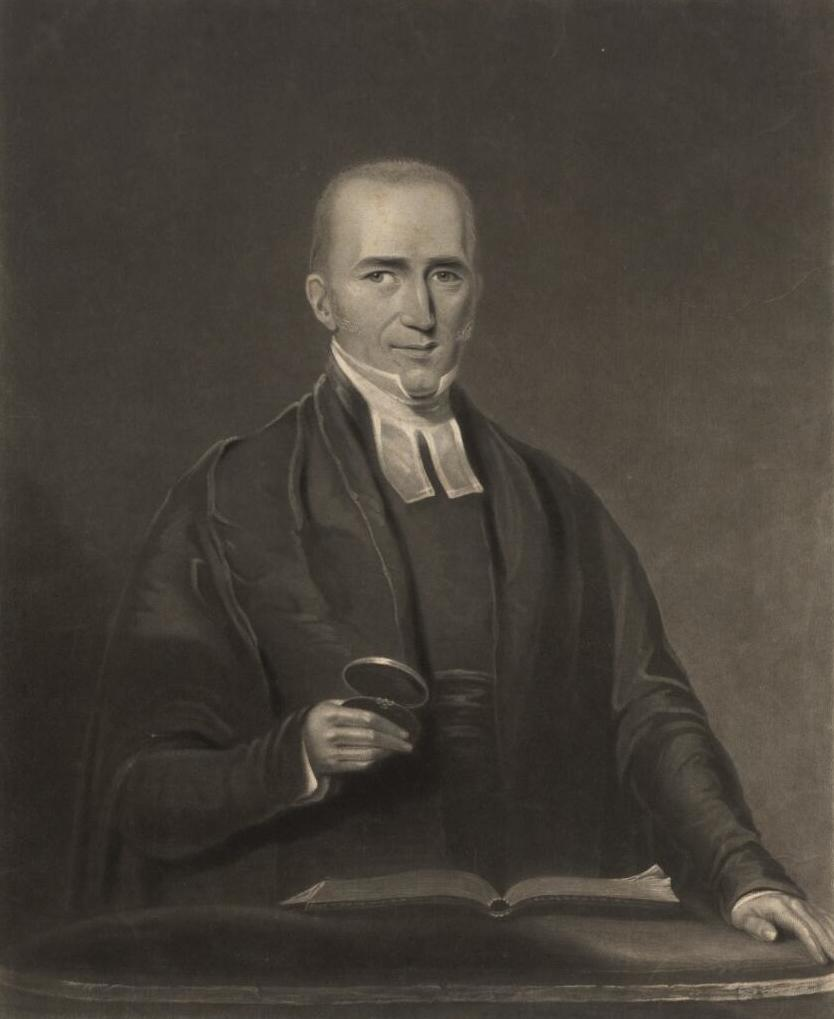
William Howels, 1831 engraving

William Howels (also Howells; 1778–1832) was a Welsh priest of the Church of England, known as an evangelical preacher.

== Life ==
The eldest of 12 children of Samuel Howells, he was born in September 1778 at Llwynhelyg, a farmhouse near Cowbridge in Glamorgan. After some years' study under the Rev. John Walton of Cowbridge, and Dr. Williams, the master of Cowbridge school, he went in April 1800 to Wadham College, Oxford. He left the university in 1803 without a degree.

An elegy by Howels on his tutor Walton in 1797, published in the Gloucester Journal, was noticed by Robert Raikes, who offered him journalistic work. At Oxford he was under Baptist influence; but he was ordained by Richard Watson, bishop of Llandaff, in June 1804, to the curacy of Llangan in Glamorgan. Both he and his vicar drew adverse comment by preaching at Methodist chapels.

In 1812 Howels became curate in the united London parishes of St Andrew-by-the-Wardrobe and St Anne, Blackfriars, to William Goode, who died in 1816. In 1817 he moved on as the lessee of the episcopal chapel in Long Acre, where he gathered together an audience. His strongly evangelical sermons were popular, and his self-denying life, though with eccentricities, baffled critics.

Howels died on 18 November 1832, and was buried in a vault under Holy Trinity Church, Cloudesley Square, Islington. In the church itself a tablet was placed to his memory. His views were taken at the time to be Calvinistic Methodist, and he strongly opposed those of the Irvingites.

== Works ==
Collections of sermons and prayers by Howels appeared after his death:

- Remains of the Rev. William Howels, edited by William Prior Moore, Dublin, 1833; new ed., London, 1852.
- Twelve Sermons, London, 1835.
- Sermons, with a Memoir by Charles Bowdler, London, 2 vols.
- Twenty Sermons, London, 1835.
- Fifty-two Sermons from Notes, by H. H. White, London, 1836.
- Prayers before and after the Sermon, London.
- Choice Sentences, edited by the Rev. W. Bruce, London, 1850.
