= Philip David =

Philip David (11 June 1709 - 3 February 1787) was a Welsh Independent minister. He was born in Ebbw Fawr, Mon. Inspired by the preaching of James Davies of Merthyr Tydfil (d. 1760), he took up preaching himself in 1732. He was later ordained, in 1739 (as co-pastor of Penmain, assisting David Williams), and remained there till he died in February 1787.

His manuscript diaries are considered to contain a highly interesting account of the Welsh Independent stance at the time.
