= Thomas Johnes (died 1780) =

British politician (died 1780)

Thomas Johnes (c. 1721–1780) was a Welsh politician who sat in the House of Commons between 1777 and 1780.

Johnes was the eldest son of Thomas Johnes, MP, of Llanfair, Cardiganshire, and his wife Mary Anne Powell, daughter of Jeremiah Powell of Cwmelan. He entered Inner Temple in 1738 and was Custos Rotulorum of Cardiganshire from 1741 to his death. In his youth he was notable in London society, and his guests at Llanfair included Sir Charles Hanbury Williams, Henry Fox, and Richard Rigby. He married Elizabeth Knight, daughter of Richard Knight (1693–1765) of Croft Castle, Herefordshire in about 1746.

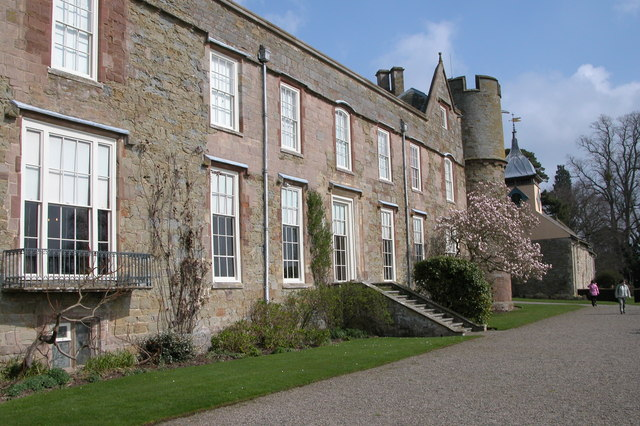
Croft Castle

After his marriage, Johnes lived in Herefordshire, but was active in politics in Cardiganshire for many years. His family was Whig by tradition. He was a candidate for Cardiganshire in 1741 and 1747, but withdrew each time. Later he acted as election manager for the Lloyd family of Peterwell, negotiating the election of John Lloyd for Cardiganshire in 1754 and of Herbert Lloyd for Cardigan Boroughs in 1761. Early in 1760, he boasted to the Duke of Newcastle that he had always shown attachment to Government. He was also associated with Lord Powis, who in 1765 backed a patronage request of his to Grenville with the assertion, “If I can depend upon anyone I am persuaded I can depend upon Mr. Johnes”.

In the 1760s Johnes remodelled Croft Castle in the Rococo-Gothic style to the design of the architect Thomas Pritchard.

In the 1774 general election Johnes was defeated at Radnorshire while his son Thomas successfully (but only after a petition) contested Cardigan Boroughs. Johnes senior was however returned unopposed for Radnorshire at the by-election on 27 July 1777 caused by the sitting member's death. During his three years in Parliament he supported the North ministry and in 1779 was appointed Lord Lieutenant of Carmarthenshire.

Johnes died in May 1780. His son Thomas succeeded him as MP for Radnorshire.

Parliament of Great Britain
Preceded by Chase Price	Member of Parliament for Radnorshire; 1777– 1780	Succeeded by Thomas Johnes
Honorary titles
Preceded by John Vaughan, 2nd Viscount Lisburne	Custos Rotulorum of Cardiganshire; 1743–1780	Succeeded by Wilmot Vaughan, 1st Earl of Lisburne
Preceded by George Rice	Lord Lieutenant of Carmarthenshire; 1779–1780	Succeeded by John Vaughan
