= Robert Hughes (poet) =

Welsh poet

Robert Hughes (Robin Ddu o Fon) (c.1744–1785) was a Welsh poet.

== Life ==
Hughes was born at Caint Bach, in the parish of Penmynydd in Anglesey about 1744. After receiving an education from the parish priest, he became a schoolmaster at Amlwch. Later he spent twenty years in London as barrister's clerk.

Ultimately Hughes's health failed; he returned to Wales, acted as a schoolmaster at Carnarvon, and died of consumption 27 February 1785, aged 41. He was buried in the parish churchyard of Llanbeblig, Carnarvonshire, where the Society of Gwyneddigion, of which he was a founder, erected a monument to his memory.

== Works ==
Hughes's Cywydd Molawd Mon, and a couple of englynion appeared with a brief biographical notice by the vicar of Llanllyfni, Carnarvonshire, in the Diddanwch Teuluaidd, 1817. In the Brython, iii. 376, appeared his Cywydd Myfyrdod y Bardd am ei Gariad, pan oedd hi yn mordwyo o Fon i Fanaw; mewn cwch a elwid "Tarw", i.e. "The bard's meditation on his sweetheart's setting sail from Anglesey to the Isle of Man in a boat called the Taurus". This is dated 1763. There is a Cywydd y Byd by him in John Blackwell's magazine Y Cylchgrawn (i. 265, 1834), and a Beddargraph (epitaph) consisting of three englynion in the Greal (London, 1805), p. 72. Nine of his poems were published in Cyfres y Ceinion, Liverpool, 1879.

== Notes ==
Attribution

This article incorporates text from a publication now in the public domain: Lee, Sidney, ed. (1891). "Hughes, Robert (1744?-1785)". Dictionary of National Biography. Vol. 28. London: Smith, Elder & Co.
