= David Williams (minister, born 1709) =

Welsh minister and schoolmaster (1709–1784)

David Williams (1709 – 5 April 1784) was an independent minister and schoolmaster. His pupils included the philosopher David Williams, with whom he is sometimes confused.

Williams was born in Pwll-y-pant near Caerphilly. He studied for the ministry at the Carmarthen Academy, and in 1734 became minister of a chapel in Cardiff. In 1739, he took over the newly built "Watford" chapel, where he entertained Howell Harris shortly afterwards. Williams and Harris later quarrelled, and the Methodist members of Williams' congregation formed a separate unit. His first wife, Mary, died in 1745, and he remarried, another Mary. One of his sons, Thomas Williams, took over from him as minister at Watford.

== Sources ==
- Welsh Biography Online
