= John Walters (priest and poet) =

Welsh Anglican priest and poet

John Walters (11 June 1760 – 28 June 1789) was a Welsh Anglican priest and poet.

== Life ==
Walters was the eldest son of John Walters, a clergyman and lexicographer, and he was born on 11 June 1760 in Llandough, Glamorgan, south Wales. He was educated at Cowbridge Grammar School and Jesus College, Oxford, matriculating in 1777 obtaining his Bachelor of Arts degree in 1781. During his time in Oxford, he was sub-librarian at the Bodleian Library. He became headmaster of Cowbridge Grammar School in 1783 and headmaster of Ruthin School in the following year, when he was also promoted to Master of Arts. Walters was later appointed as rector of Efenechtyd, Denbighshire. He died on 28 June 1789 in Ruthin, survived by his wife and two daughters.

== Works ==
Walters was a noted poet, publishing Poems with Notes in 1780 whilst still a university student. Translated Specimens of Welsh Poetry followed in 1782. Other works included an edition and translation of Llywarch Hen's poems (published in The History of Wales by Warrington in 1788) and sermons. A new edition of Toxophilus printed by R.Marsh of Wrexham in 1788. It was edited with an introduction by the Rev. John Walters, M.A., Master of Ruthin Grammar School. This date coincides with the formation of the Royal British Bowmen, in Wrexham, in 1787!
