= Edward Smallwell =

British bishop (died 1799)

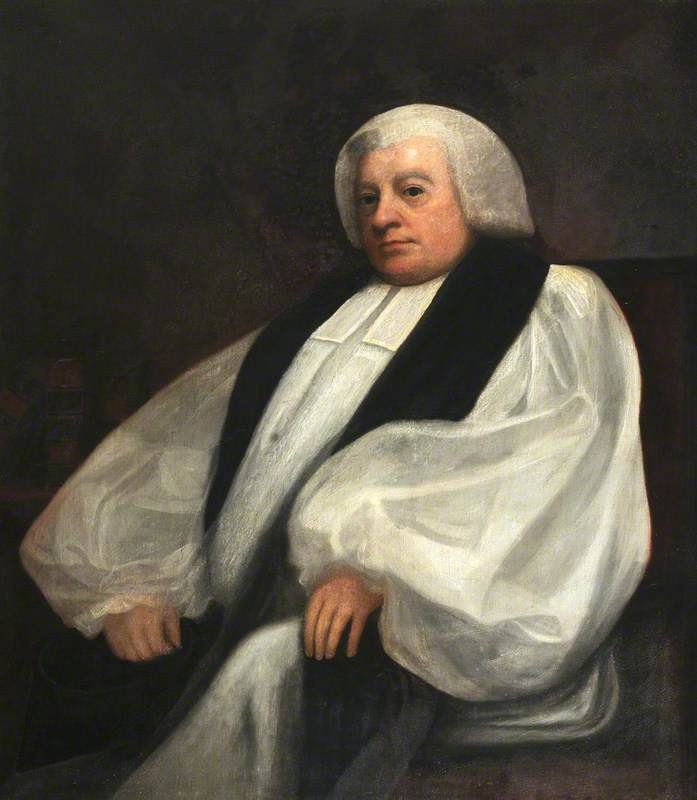
Edward Smallwell, Bishop of Oxford

Edward Smallwell (c.1720–1799) was an English bishop of St David's and bishop of Oxford.

== Life ==
He was chaplain to George III in 1766, made canon of Christ Church, Oxford, in 1775, and obtained the degree of D.D. He was appointed in 1783 as bishop of St David's, and was then translated to Oxford in 1788. He was also rector of Batsford in Gloucestershire. He died at his palace at Cuddesdon.

== Bibliography ==
- John Britton (1821), The History and Antiquities of the Cathedral Church of Oxford, p. 32.

Church of England titles
| Preceded by John Warren | Bishop of St David's; 1783–1788 | Succeeded by Samuel Horsley |
| Preceded by John Butler | Bishop of Oxford; 1788–1799 | Succeeded by John Randolph |
