= John Moore (archbishop of Canterbury) =

Archbishop of Canterbury from 1783 to 1805

The Most Reverend and Right Honourable John Moore
- Archbishop of Canterbury
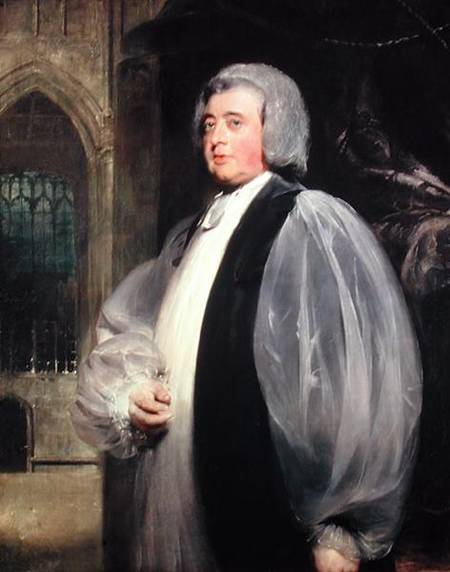
- Portrait by Thomas Lawrence
- Church: Church of England
- Province: Canterbury
- Diocese: Canterbury
- Elected: 26 April 1783 (confirmation of election)
- Term ended: 18 January 1805 (death)
- Predecessor: Frederick Cornwallis
- Successor: Charles Manners-Sutton
- Other posts: Dean of Canterbury (1771–1775); Bishop of Bangor (1774–1783)

Orders
- Consecration: 12 February 1775 by Frederick Cornwallis

Personal details
- Born: 1730 Gloucester, Gloucestershire, England
- Died: 18 January 1805 (aged 74–75) Lambeth, Surrey, England
- Buried: St Mary-at-Lambeth
- Denomination: Anglican
- Spouse: Jane Wright (m. 1763) Catherine Eden (m. 1770)
- Education: Pembroke College, Oxford
- Signature: John Moore's signature

Ordination history of John Moore
History
Episcopal consecration
- Principal consecrator: Frederick Cornwallis (Canterbury)
- Co-consecrators: Edmund Keene (Ely); Robert Lowth (Oxford); John Thomas (Rochester)
- Date: 12 February 1775
- Place: Lambeth Palace Chapel

John Moore (1730 – 18 January 1805) was an English clergyman who was Archbishop of Canterbury in the Church of England.

== Life ==
Moore was the son of George Moore, a butcher, and Jane Cook. He was baptised at St. Michael's Church, Gloucester on 13 January 1730. He was educated at the Crypt School, Gloucester. He was a student at Pembroke College, Oxford (matriculated 1745; BA 1748; MA 1751).

After ordination, Moore was for some years tutor to Charles and Robert, the younger sons of Charles Spencer, Duke of Marlborough. On 21 September 1761, he was preferred to the fifth prebendal stall in the church of Durham and, in April 1763, to a canonry at Christ Church, Oxford.

On 1 July 1764, Moore received the degrees of B.D. and D.D. In September 1771, he was made Dean of Canterbury, and in February 1775, Bishop of Bangor.

On the death of Archbishop Frederick Cornwallis, Moore was translated to the See of Canterbury on 26 April 1783, on the joint recommendation of bishops Robert Lowth and Richard Hurd, both of whom had declined the primacy.

Moore was a competent administrator and a promoter of the Sunday-school movement and missionary efforts.

Moore died at Lambeth Palace on 18 January 1805 and was buried in Lambeth parish church.

== Family ==
Moore married twice, first, a sister of James Wright; secondly, on 23 January 1770, Catherine, daughter of Robert Eden, of West Auckland. He left children.

== Discovery of his coffin ==
In 2017, during the refurbishment of the Garden Museum, which is housed at the medieval church of St Mary-at-Lambeth, 30 lead coffins were found; one with an archbishop's red and gold mitre on top of it. A metal plate identified one of these as belonging to Moore, with another being that of his wife Catherine.

== Arms ==
Coat of arms of John Moore

Notes
While serving as a bishop Moore's arms would be displayed impaled with the arms of the diocese and topped by a mitre.
Escutcheon
Argent on a chevron Sable between three moors’ heads Proper couped at the shoulders habited Or two swords points fesswards Proper hilted and pommelled of the last.

== Sources ==
- Aston, Nigel (January 2008) [Sep 2004]. "Moore, John (bap. 1730, d. 1805)". Oxford Dictionary of National Biography. Oxford Dictionary of National Biography (online ed.). Oxford University Press. doi:10.1093/ref:odnb/19131. (Subscription, Wikipedia Library access or UK public library membership required.)

Church of England titles
Preceded by Brownlow North	Dean of Canterbury; 1771–1775	Succeeded by The Hon James Cornwallis
Preceded by John Ewer	Bishop of Bangor; 1774–1783	Succeeded by John Warren
Preceded by The Hon Frederick Cornwallis	Archbishop of Canterbury; 1783–1805	Succeeded by Charles Manners-Sutton
