= Sir Hugh Owen, 5th Baronet =

Welsh politician

Sir Hugh Owen, 5th Baronet (?1731–1786), of Orielton, Pembrokeshire, Wales was a Welsh politician who sat in the House of Commons from 1770 to 1786.

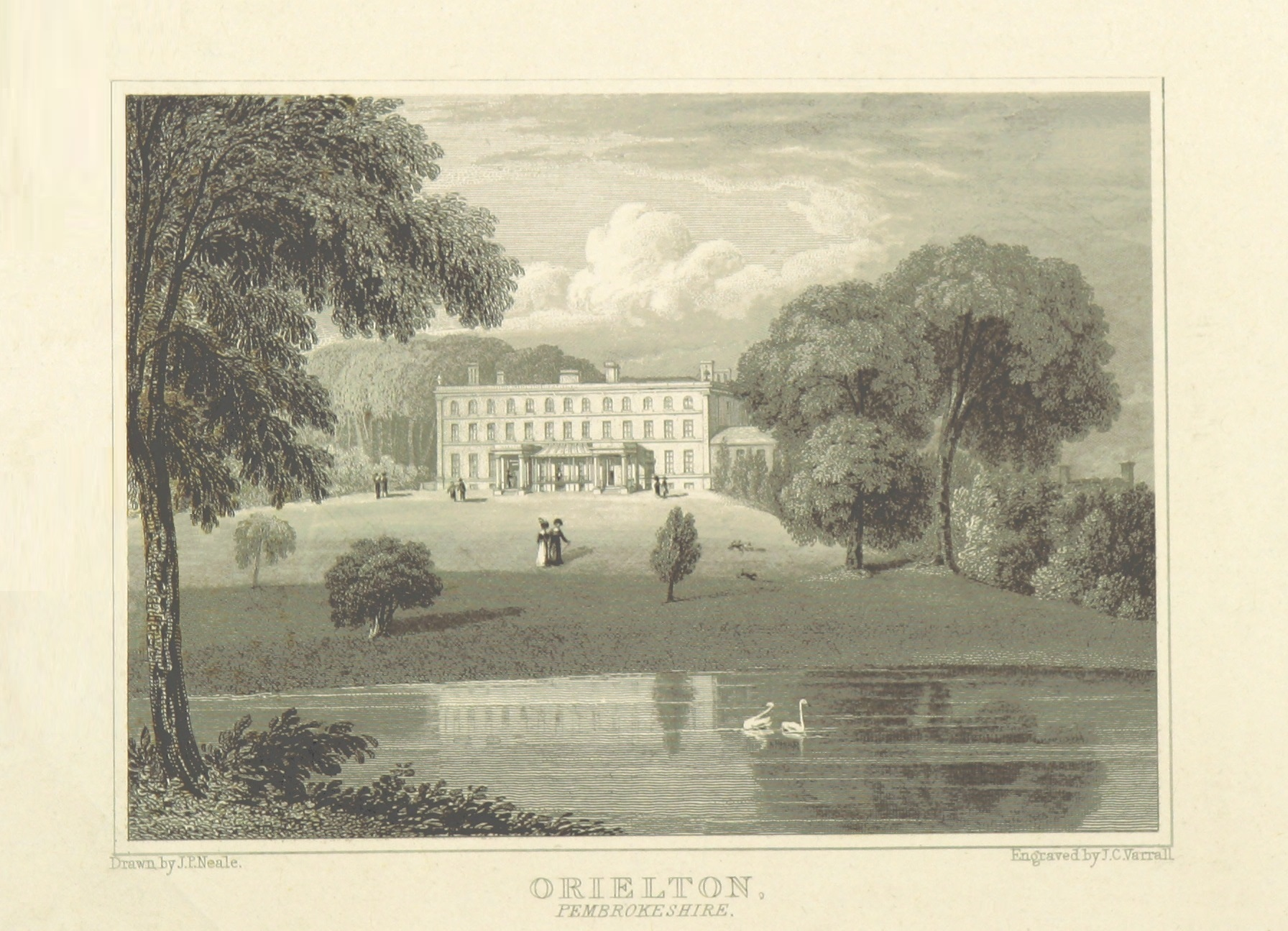
Orielton in 1818

Owen was the eldest son of Sir William Owen, 4th Baronet and educated at Newcome's School in Hackney, London. His father appointed him Colonel of the Pembrokeshire Militia when it was embodied in 1759. He succeeded his father as 5th baronet and to Orielton, Pembrokeshire in 1781.

He was the Member of Parliament (MP) for Pembrokeshire, 20 March 1770 – 16 January 1786.

He married Anne, the daughter of John Colby of Bletherston, and had one son and heir, Hugh, the 6th Baronet.

Parliament of Great Britain
Preceded by Sir Richard Philipps, Bt	Member of Parliament for Pembrokeshire; 1770–1786	Succeeded by The Lord Milford
Baronetage of England
Preceded by William Owen	Baronet (of Orielton); 1781–1786	Succeeded by Hugh Owen
