= John Vaughan (died 1804) =

Welsh landowner and politician

John Vaughan (c. 1752–1804) was a Welsh landowner and politician who sat in the House of Commons from 1779 to 1784.

Vaughan was the eldest son of Richard Vaughan of Golden Grove, Carmarthenshire, and his first wife Margaret Phillips, daughter of Charles Phillips of Llanelly. He was admitted at Lincoln's Inn in 1771. He undertook a Grand Tour in the company of John Campbell, 1st Baron Cawdor.

Vaughan was returned unopposed as Member of Parliament for Carmarthenshire at a by-election on 2 September 1779 and at the 1780 general election. He was appointed Lord Lieutenant of Carmarthenshire in 1780. He succeeded his father to his extensive estates in 1781 and married Elizabeth Letitia Maude, daughter of Sir Cornwallis Maude, 3rd Baronet on 16 June 1781. He did not stand in 1784. He does not appear to have spoken in the Parliament.

Vaughan died on 19 January 1804 without legitimate issue and left his estate to his friend Lord Cawdor. The Gentleman's Magazine (1804, p. 687) wrote “‘He has left several natural children in the neighbourhood without the smallest provision for either of them.”

Parliament of Great Britain
Preceded by George Rice	Member of Parliament for Carmarthenshire; 1779–1784	Succeeded by Sir William Mansel
Honorary titles
Preceded by Thomas Johnes	Lord Lieutenant of Carmarthenshire; 1780–1804	Succeeded by The Lord Dynevor
