= John Warren (bishop) =

Bishop of St David's and Bishop of Bangor

The Right Reverend John Warren
- Bishop of Bangor
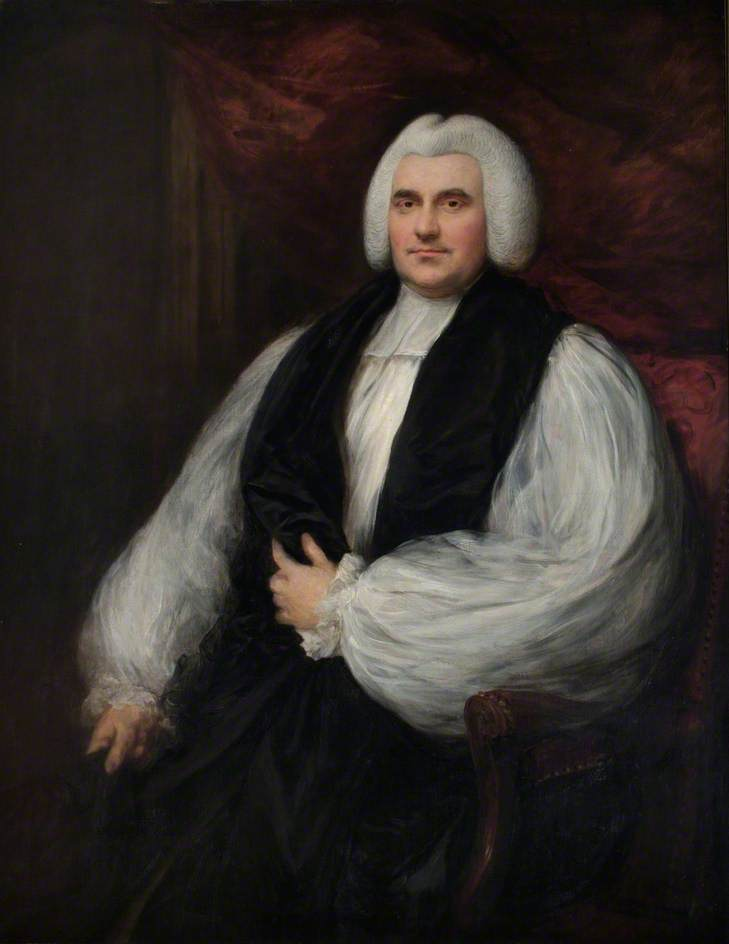
- Portrait by Thomas Gainsborough
- Diocese: Diocese of Bangor
- In office: 1783–1800 (death)
- Predecessor: John Moore
- Successor: William Cleaver
- Other post: Bishop of St David's (1779–1783)

Personal details
- Born: 12 May 1730 Cavendish, Suffolk
- Died: 27 January 1800 (aged 69) George Street, London
- Buried: Westminster Abbey
- Denomination: Anglican
- Spouse: Elizabeth Southwell (m.1777)
- Education: Gonville and Caius College, Cambridge

John Warren (12 May 1730 – 27 January 1800) was Bishop of St David's 1779–1783, and Bishop of Bangor from 1783 until his death.

Warren was born at Cavendish, Suffolk, the son of Richard Warren, the Archdeacon of Suffolk. He was educated in Bury St Edmunds and at Gonville and Caius College, Cambridge, graduating BA in 1751.

In 1773, he was vicar of the Parish Church of St Peter and St Paul, Wisbech. Before his promotion to bishop, Warren was Archdeacon of Worcester. During the bishop's time at Bangor, he was involved in two major controversies. In October 1793, he became involved in a dispute with the Parys and Mona Mine companies over the demolition and rebuilding of Amlwch parish church. The bishop claimed that the mining companies had promised to rebuild the church; they denied this, but eventually agreed to make a financial contribution.

In 1796, the bishop was involved in another dispute, which resulted in a court case. Warren had appointed his own nephew Registrar of the diocese of Bangor, even though the latter was under age. When the bishop attempted to sack the Deputy Registrar, Samuel Grindley, Grindley refused to leave his office, and a tussle ensued in which the bishop was threatened with a pistol and had to be dragged away by his wife.

== Notes ==
Church of England titles
Preceded by John Tottie	Archdeacon of Worcester; 1775–1787	Succeeded by Thomas Evans
Preceded by James Yorke	Bishop of St David's; 1779–1783	Succeeded by Edward Smallwell
Preceded by John Moore	Bishop of Bangor; 1783–1800	Succeeded by William Cleaver
