= Charles Morgan (Breconshire MP, born 1736) =

Welsh politician

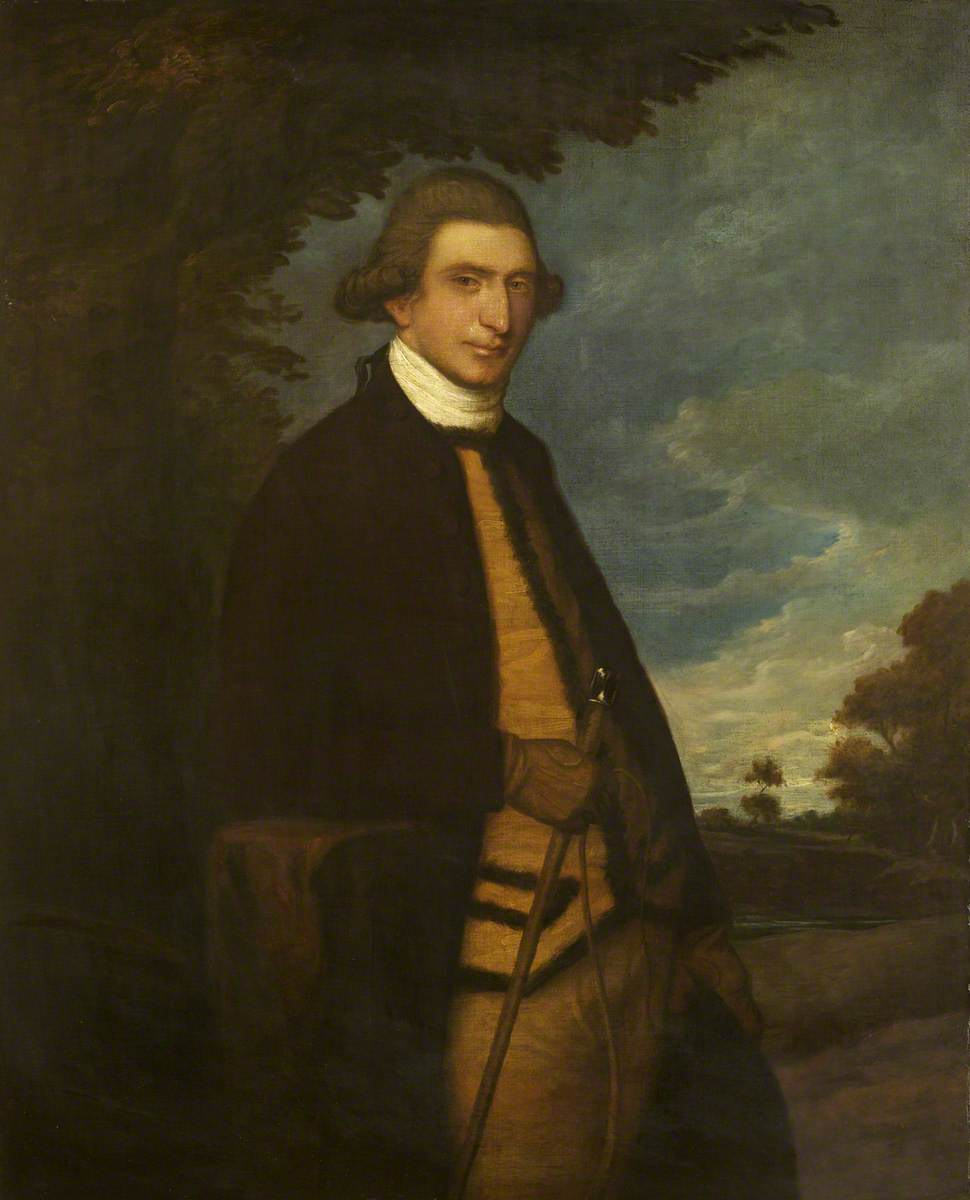
- Born: 1736
- Died: 24 May 1787 (aged 50–51)
- Spouse: Mary Gough
- Father: Thomas Morgan

Charles Morgan "of Dderw" (1736 – 24 May 1787) was a Welsh politician who sat in the House of Commons between 1763 and 1787.

Morgan was the second son of Thomas Morgan and his wife, Jane Colchester. He married Mary Gough, widow of Robert Myners Gough and daughter of Thomas Parry, but had no children by her.

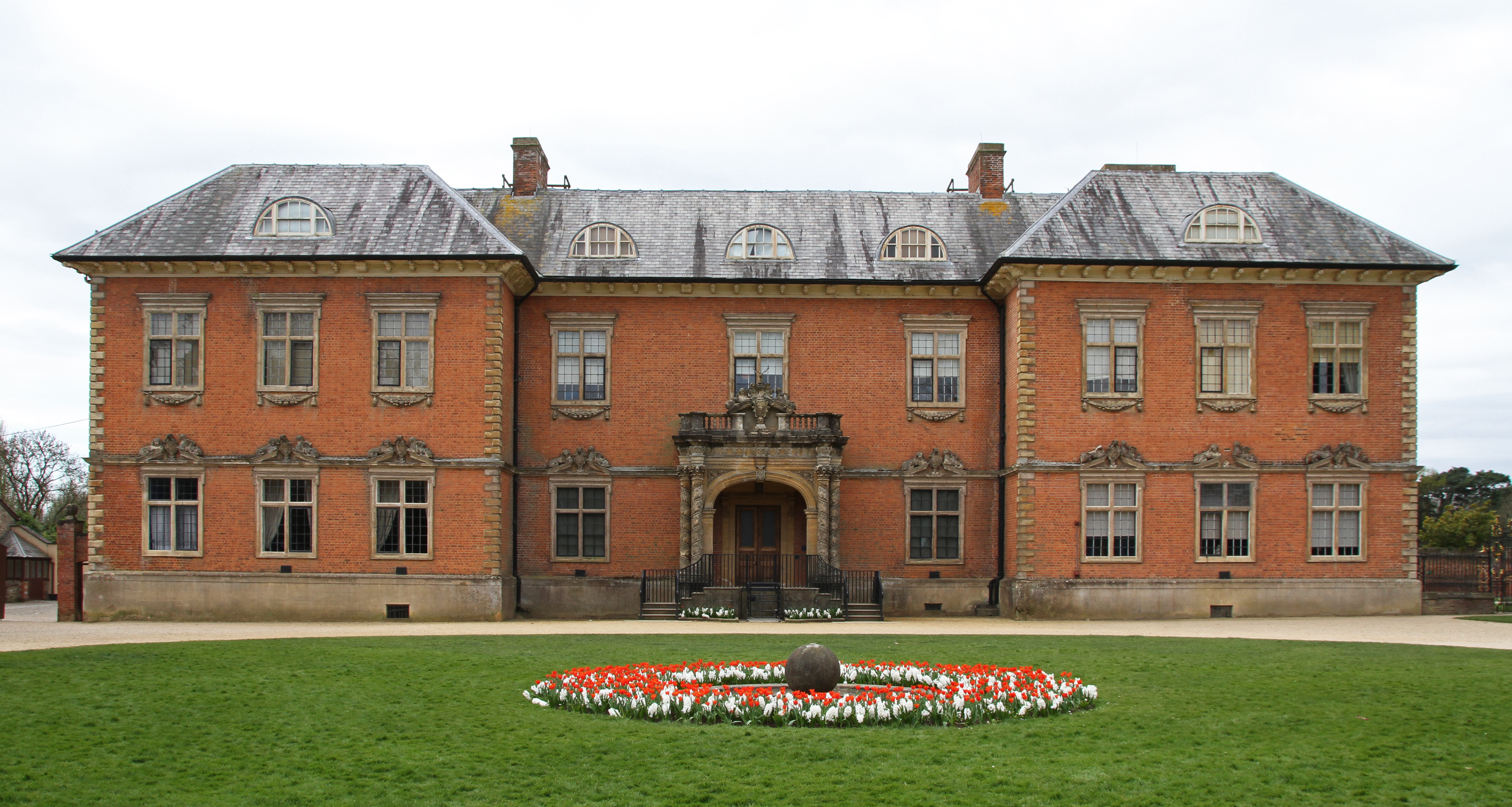
Tredegar House

In 1763, Morgan was returned as Member of Parliament for Brecon, succeeding his elder brother Thomas. He was Bailiff of Brecon in 1768, and a lieutenant in the Foot Guards 1769. That year he accepted the Stewardship of the Manner of East Hendred to succeed his late father in a by-election at Breconshire, which he represented until his death.

In 1771, he inherited the Tredegar estate from his elder brother, Thomas Morgan, and succeeded him as Lord Lieutenant of Brecknockshire. The castle on Morgan's estate at Rhiwpera burned down in 1783, and rebuilding was not completed until after his death.

He died on 24 May 1787. His estates went to his younger brother, John Morgan.

Parliament of Great Britain
Preceded by Thomas Morgan	Member of Parliament for Brecon; 1763–1769	Succeeded by John Morgan
Preceded by Thomas Morgan	Member of Parliament for Breconshire; 1769–1787	Succeeded by Sir Charles Gould
Honorary titles
Preceded by Thomas Morgan	Lord Lieutenant of Brecknockshire; 1771–1787	Succeeded by The Duke of Beaufort
