= Lord Lieutenant of Carmarthenshire =

Welsh county ceremonial officer

This is a list of people who have served as Lord Lieutenant of Carmarthenshire. After 1762, all Lord Lieutenants were also Custos Rotulorum of Carmarthenshire. The office was abolished on 31 March 1974 and replaced by the Lord Lieutenant of Dyfed.

== Lord Lieutenants of Carmarthenshire to 1974 ==
- see Lord Lieutenant of Wales before 1694
- Thomas Herbert, 8th Earl of Pembroke 11 May 1694 – 7 October 1715
- vacant
- George Rice 5 May 1755 – 2 August 1779
- Thomas Johnes 7 September 1779 – 28 April 1780
- John Vaughan 28 April 1780 – 19 January 1804
- George Rice, 3rd Baron Dynevor 21 April 1804 – 9 April 1852
- John Campbell, 1st Earl Cawdor 4 May 1852 – 7 November 1860
- John Campbell, 2nd Earl Cawdor 26 April 1861 – 29 March 1898
- Sir James Williams-Drummond, 4th Baronet 12 July 1898 – 15 June 1913
- John Williams Gwynne Hughes 15 September 1913 – January 1917
- John Hinds 22 March 1917 – 23 July 1928
- Walter FitzUryan Rice, 7th Baron Dynevor 11 August 1928 – 17 January 1949
- Sir George Clark Williams, 1st Baronet 17 January 1949 – 1953
- Sir Grismond Picton Philipps 23 February 1954 – 8 May 1967
- Charles William Nevill 25 July 1967 – 2 June 1973
- Sir David Courtenay Mansel Lewis 7 June 1973 – 31 March 1974

== Deputy lieutenants ==
A deputy lieutenant of Carmarthenshire is commissioned by the Lord Lieutenant of Carmarthenshire. Deputy lieutenants support the work of the lord-lieutenant. There can be several deputy lieutenants at any time, depending on the population of the county. Their appointment does not terminate with the changing of the lord-lieutenant, but they usually retire at age 75.

=== 18th Century ===
- 2 June 1798: Edward Picton
- 3 July 1798: Lewis Lewis

=== 19th Century ===
- 5 March 1813: David Protheroe

== Sources ==
- J.C. Sainty (1970). "Lieutenancies of Counties, 1585–1642". Bulletin of the Institute of Historical Research (Special Supplement No. 8).
- J.C. Sainty (1979). List of Lieutenants of Counties of England and Wales 1660-1974. London: Swift Printers (Sales) Ltd.
