= 1740s in Wales =

- 1730s | 1750s | Other years in Wales
- Other events of the decade

This article is about the particular significance of the decade 1740–1749 to Wales and its people.

== Events ==
1740 in Wales
1741 in Wales
1742 in Wales
1743 in Wales
1744 in Wales
1745 in Wales
1746 in Wales
1747 in Wales
1748 in Wales
1749 in Wales

== Arts and literature ==
=== New books ===
1740

- John Dyer - The Ruins of Rome
- Griffith Jones (Llanddowror) - Welsh Piety
- Zachariah Williams - The Mariners Compass Completed

1742

1744

- Jane Brereton - Poems on several occasions (posthumously published)

1746

- Anna Williams - Life of the Emperor Julian (translation from the French)

1749

- Zachariah Williams - A True Narrative of certain Circumstances relating to Zachariah Williams in the Charterhouse

=== Music ===
1740

- Howell Harris - Llyfr o Hymneu o Waith Amryw Awdwyr (collection of hymns)

1742

- Howell Harris & Daniel Rowland - Sail, Dibenion, a Rheolau'r Societies (collection of hymns)

1744

- William Williams Pantycelyn - Aleluia (hymns: first part)

== Births ==
1740

- date unknown - Sir Watkin Lewes, politician (d. 1821)

1741

- January 16 - Hester Thrale, diarist and friend of Dr Johnson (d. 1821)
- August 20 - Henry Herbert, 1st Earl of Carnarvon (d. 1811)
- September 3 - Owen Jones, antiquary (d. 1814)

1742

- September 26 - Thomas Jones, landscape painter (d. 1803)
- December 3 - Sir Erasmus Gower, naval commander (d. 1814)

1745

- February 14 - David Davis (Castellhywel), poet (d. 1827)

1746

- September 28 - William Jones, philologist (d. 1794)

1747

- January - Richard Fenton, poet and author (d. 1821)

1748

- September 1 - Thomas Johnes, landowner (d. 1816)

1749

- September 23 - Sir Watkin Williams-Wynn, 4th Baronet, politician (d. 1789)

== Deaths ==
1740

- August 7 - Jane Brereton, poet, 55
- October 20 - Sir William Williams, 2nd Baronet, of Gray's Inn, politician, 75?

1741

- August - David Owen, 29 ("David of the White Rock"), harpist,
- date unknown
  - Wil Hopcyn, poet, 41?
  - Robert Roberts, theologian, 61?

1743

- July 15 - John Wynne, bishop, 83?
- date unknown
  - Thomas Morgan, Deist theologian
  - Robert Wynne, clergyman and academic

1744

- March 2 - William Maxwell, 5th Earl of Nithsdale, Jacobite, husband of Winifred Herbert

1745

- May 7 - Sir Thomas Hanmer, politician and literary editor, 68

1746

- May 21 - Lewis Morris, Welsh-descended Governor of New Jersey, 74

1748

- August 27 - Sir Robert Salusbury Cotton, 3rd Baronet, 53

1749

- May - Winifred Herbert, Countess of Nithsdale, 58?
- August - Angharad James, poet, 72
- September 26 - Sir Watkin Williams-Wynn, 3rd Baronet, 57
