= 1736 in Wales =

- Centuries: 16th; 17th; 18th; 19th; 20th
- Decades: 1710s; 1720s; 1730s; 1740s; 1750s
- See also: List of years in Wales; Timeline of Welsh history 1736 in Great Britain Scotland Elsewhere

This article is about the particular significance of the year 1736 to Wales and its people.

== Incumbents ==
- Lord Lieutenant of North Wales (Lord Lieutenant of Anglesey, Caernarvonshire, Flintshire, Merionethshire, Montgomeryshire) – George Cholmondeley, 3rd Earl of Cholmondeley
- Lord Lieutenant of Glamorgan – Charles Powlett, 3rd Duke of Bolton
- Lord Lieutenant of Brecknockshire and Lord Lieutenant of Monmouthshire – Thomas Morgan
- Lord Lieutenant of Cardiganshire – John Vaughan, 2nd Viscount Lisburne
- Lord Lieutenant of Carmarthenshire – vacant until 1755
- Lord Lieutenant of Denbighshire – Sir Robert Salusbury Cotton, 3rd Baronet
- Lord Lieutenant of Pembrokeshire – Sir Arthur Owen, 3rd Baronet
- Lord Lieutenant of Radnorshire – James Brydges, 1st Duke of Chandos
- Bishop of Bangor – Charles Cecil
- Bishop of Llandaff – John Harris
- Bishop of St Asaph – Isaac Maddox (from 4 July)
- Bishop of St Davids – Nicholas Clagett

== Events ==
- 17 April - Frederick, Prince of Wales, marries Princess Augusta of Saxe-Gotha at the Chapel Royal in St James's Palace, London.
- 4 July - Isaac Maddox is consecrated Bishop of St Asaph. Maddox continues to reside in south-east England and rarely visits the diocese.
- 28 July - John Harris, Bishop of Llandaff, becomes Dean of Wells Cathedral in succession to Isaac Maddox.
- Thomas Frye paints the Prince of Wales for the Worshipful Company of Saddlers.
- date unknown
  - Sixty soldiers are drowned after their vessel is wrecked on the Wolves rocks near Flat Holm; the incident leads to the building of a lighthouse on the island.
  - Howell Harris opens a school.
  - Fortunatus Wright marries Mary, daughter of William Bulkeley, in Dublin.

== Arts and literature ==
=== New books ===
- Rees Ellis - "A Summer Carol"
- Anthony Ellys - A Plea for the Sacramental Test as best Security for the Church established, and very conducive to the Welfare of the State
- John Reynolds - Heraldry Displayed

== Births ==
- 6 July - Daniel Morgan, American pioneer, soldier and politician, of Welsh ancestry (d. 1802)
- 10 July - David Jones, Church of England priest and an early supporter of Welsh Calvinistic Methodism (d. 1810)
- 31 August - David Ellis, clergyman, poet and transcriber of manuscripts (d. 1795)
- 22 October - John Thomas, Anglican priest and antiquarian (d. 1769)
- date unknown
  - Charles Morgan, politician (d. 1787)
  - Thomas Wynn, 1st Baron Newborough, politician (d. 1807)

== Deaths ==
- June - Edward Prideaux Gwyn, about 38
- November? - Griffith Wynn, translator, about 76
- 22 November - Thomas Lewis, politician, owner of The Van estate, 56/57
- date unknown - Edward Kemys, MP for Monmouth Boroughs, about 43
