= 1737 in Wales =

- Centuries: 16th; 17th; 18th; 19th; 20th
- Decades: 1710s; 1720s; 1730s; 1740s; 1750s
- See also: List of years in Wales; Timeline of Welsh history 1737 in Great Britain Scotland Elsewhere

This article is about the particular significance of the year 1737 to Wales and its people.

== Incumbents ==
- Lord Lieutenant of North Wales (Lord Lieutenant of Anglesey, Caernarvonshire, Flintshire, Merionethshire, Montgomeryshire) – George Cholmondeley, 3rd Earl of Cholmondeley
- Lord Lieutenant of Glamorgan – Charles Powlett, 3rd Duke of Bolton
- Lord Lieutenant of Brecknockshire and Lord Lieutenant of Monmouthshire – Thomas Morgan
- Lord Lieutenant of Cardiganshire – John Vaughan, 2nd Viscount Lisburne
- Lord Lieutenant of Carmarthenshire – vacant until 1755
- Lord Lieutenant of Denbighshire – Sir Robert Salusbury Cotton, 3rd Baronet
- Lord Lieutenant of Pembrokeshire – Sir Arthur Owen, 3rd Baronet
- Lord Lieutenant of Radnorshire – James Brydges, 1st Duke of Chandos
- Bishop of Bangor – Charles Cecil (until 29 May); Thomas Herring (nominated as successor)
- Bishop of Llandaff – John Harris
- Bishop of St Asaph – Isaac Maddox
- Bishop of St Davids – Nicholas Clagett

== Events ==
- 14 February – William Talbot, MP for Glamorganshire, succeeds his father as Baron Talbot.
- February – The House of Commons debates whether to increase the Prince of Wales's Civil List allowance after his father, the king, turns down his request. Parliament decides to reject the idea of an increase.
- April – The "New Cut" is excavated, in the Dee Estuary, to improve access to Chester. It diverts the river's course to the Welsh side of the estuary, but fails to prevent further silting up of the river.
- 13 August – Howel Harris and Daniel Rowland meet for the first time, at Defynnog.
- 31 August – The Prince and Princess of Wales have their first child, Princess Augusta. The birth takes place at St James's Palace, the royal couple having absconded from Hampton Court Palace in the middle of the night to avoid the King and Queen being present.
- 1 December – The newly erected lighthouse on Flat Holm is lit for the first time.
- date unknown
  - Conversion of William Williams Pantycelyn to Methodism, after hearing Howel Harris preach in Talgarth churchyard.
  - Welsh settlers establish their first settlement in the vicinity of Marlboro County, South Carolina, called Welsh Neck.
  - Tinplate manufacture at Kidwelly begins.
  - The Baptist chapel at Capel-y-ffin is begun by William and David Prosser, who brought "The Ministry of the Gospel to their house in the year 1737. And Secured this Place for That Sacred Use for the Time Being."
- Thomas Jones of Abermarles is High Sheriff of Cardiganshire.

== Arts and literature ==
=== New books ===
- Thomas Beach – Eugenio, or the Virtuous and Happy Life
- John Evans – Practical Discourses concerning the Christian Temper; being 38 sermons upon the principal heads of Practical Religion (4th ed.)
- Isaac Maddox, Bishop of St Asaph – The love of our country recommended: [for] the Societies for Reformation of Manners.

== Births ==
- 13 May – Thomas Williams of Llanidan, industrialist (d. 1802)
- 31 August – Princess Augusta, eldest child of the Prince and Princess of Wales (d. 1813)
- date unknown – Richard Pennant, 1st Baron Penrhyn, politician and slave-owner (d. 1808)

== Deaths ==
- 14 February – Charles Talbot, 1st Baron Talbot, 52
- 17 May – Thomas Beach, poet (age unknown; suicide).
- 29 May – Charles Cecil, Bishop of Bangor, 40s
- 20 November – Caroline of Brandenburg-Ansbach, consort of King George II of Great Britain and former Princess of Wales (1714–1727), 54
- date unknown
  - Humphrey Foulkes, priest and antiquarian, about 65
  - Guto Nyth Brân, legendary athlete, 37
