= 1740 in Wales =

- Centuries: 16th; 17th; 18th; 19th; 20th
- Decades: 1720s; 1730s; 1740s; 1750s; 1760s
- See also: List of years in Wales; Timeline of Welsh history 1740 in Great Britain Scotland Elsewhere

Events from the year 1740 in Wales.

== Incumbents ==
- Lord Lieutenant of North Wales (Lord Lieutenant of Anglesey, Caernarvonshire, Flintshire, Merionethshire, Montgomeryshire) – George Cholmondeley, 3rd Earl of Cholmondeley
- Lord Lieutenant of Glamorgan – Charles Powlett, 3rd Duke of Bolton
- Lord Lieutenant of Brecknockshire and Lord Lieutenant of Monmouthshire – Thomas Morgan
- Lord Lieutenant of Cardiganshire – John Vaughan, 2nd Viscount Lisburne
- Lord Lieutenant of Carmarthenshire – vacant until 1755
- Lord Lieutenant of Denbighshire – Sir Robert Salusbury Cotton, 3rd Baronet
- Lord Lieutenant of Pembrokeshire – Sir Arthur Owen, 3rd Baronet
- Lord Lieutenant of Radnorshire – James Brydges, 1st Duke of Chandos
- Bishop of Bangor – Thomas Herring
- Bishop of Llandaff – Matthias Mawson (until 21 October); John Gilbert (from 28 December)
- Bishop of St Asaph – Isaac Maddox
- Bishop of St Davids – Nicholas Clagett

== Events ==
- 6 November - Charles Wesley records in his diary a visit to the Glascott family home at Cardiff.
- date unknown - William Williams Pantycelyn becomes a deacon and is appointed curate to Theophilus Evans at Llanfaes.

== Arts and literature ==
=== New books ===
- John Dyer - The Ruins of Rome
- Griffith Jones (Llanddowror) - Welsh Piety
- Zachariah Williams - The Mariners Compass Completed

=== Music ===
- Howell Harris - Llyfr o Hymneu o Waith Amryw Awdwyr (collection of hymns)

== Births ==
- 23 February - Benjamin Evans, Congregational minister and author (died 1821)
- 26 December - John Williams (Ioan Rhagfyr), musician (died 1821)
- date unknown - Sir Watkin Lewes, politician (died 1821)

== Deaths ==
- 3 April - Thomas Dominic Williams, Roman Catholic bishop, 78/9
- 7 August - Jane Brereton, poet, 55
- 3 October - Price Devereux, 9th Viscount Hereford, politician, 76
- 20 October - Sir William Williams, 2nd Baronet, of Gray's Inn, politician, 75?
- date unknown
  - Enoch Francis, Baptist
  - John Morris, youngest of the Morris brothers of Anglesey, 34 (died at sea during an attack on Cartagena)
