= 1738 in Wales =

- Centuries: 16th; 17th; 18th; 19th; 20th
- Decades: 1710s; 1720s; 1730s; 1740s; 1750s
- See also: List of years in Wales; Timeline of Welsh history 1738 in Great Britain Scotland Elsewhere

This article is about the particular significance of the year 1738 to Wales and its people.

== Incumbents ==
- Lord Lieutenant of North Wales (Lord Lieutenant of Anglesey, Caernarvonshire, Flintshire, Merionethshire, Montgomeryshire) – George Cholmondeley, 3rd Earl of Cholmondeley
- Lord Lieutenant of Glamorgan – Charles Powlett, 3rd Duke of Bolton
- Lord Lieutenant of Brecknockshire and Lord Lieutenant of Monmouthshire – Thomas Morgan
- Lord Lieutenant of Cardiganshire – John Vaughan, 2nd Viscount Lisburne
- Lord Lieutenant of Carmarthenshire – vacant until 1755
- Lord Lieutenant of Denbighshire – Sir Robert Salusbury Cotton, 3rd Baronet
- Lord Lieutenant of Pembrokeshire – Sir Arthur Owen, 3rd Baronet
- Lord Lieutenant of Radnorshire – James Brydges, 1st Duke of Chandos
- Bishop of Bangor – Thomas Herring (from 15 January)
- Bishop of Llandaff – John Harris (until 28 August)
- Bishop of St Asaph – Isaac Maddox
- Bishop of St Davids – Nicholas Clagett

== Events ==
- March – Howel Harris preaches in Monmouthshire for the first time.
- 14 May – John Wesley hears William Holland read from the work of Martin Luther, occasioning his own conversion.
- May – The Bala Eisteddfod takes place, chaired by Edward Wynne. Ellis Cadwaladr is winner of the bardic chair.
- unknown dates
  - A new building, designed by James Steer to house the Welsh Charity School is erected in London.
  - A Baptist church is founded at Welsh Neck in South Carolina, United States.
  - Morgan Edwards begins his career as a preacher.
  - Lawyer John Meredith is knighted and becomes High Sheriff of Brecknock.

== Arts and literature ==
=== New books ===
==== English language ====
- Anne Penny – Select Poems from Mr. Gesner's Pastorals

==== Welsh language ====
- Newyddion Mawr Oddiwrth y Ser

=== Music ===
- William Williams Pantycelyn – Caniadau ... y Môr o Wydr

== Births ==
- 4 June – Prince George, eldest son of the Prince and Princess of Wales (died 1820)
- September (in Ireland) – Francis Mathew, 1st Earl Landaff (died 1806)
- date unknown – David Williams, philosopher (died 1816)

== Deaths ==
- January – Thomas Harley (of Kinsham), former MP for Radnorshire, about 63
- 12 June – Samuel Edwards, politician, about 70
- 28 August – John Harris, Bishop of Llandaff, 58
- 1 September – Mathias Maurice, minister and author, 54
- 27 September – Sir Thomas Stradling, 6th Baronet, 28 (in a duel)
