= 1735 in Wales =

- Centuries: 16th; 17th; 18th; 19th; 20th
- Decades: 1710s; 1720s; 1730s; 1740s; 1750s
- See also: List of years in Wales; Timeline of Welsh history 1735 in Great Britain Scotland Elsewhere

This article is about the particular significance of the year 1735 to Wales and its people.

== Incumbents ==
- Lord Lieutenant of North Wales (Lord Lieutenant of Anglesey, Caernarvonshire, Flintshire, Merionethshire, Montgomeryshire) – George Cholmondeley, 3rd Earl of Cholmondeley
- Lord Lieutenant of Glamorgan – Charles Powlett, 3rd Duke of Bolton
- Lord Lieutenant of Brecknockshire and Lord Lieutenant of Monmouthshire – Thomas Morgan
- Lord Lieutenant of Cardiganshire – John Vaughan, 2nd Viscount Lisburne
- Lord Lieutenant of Carmarthenshire – vacant until 1755
- Lord Lieutenant of Denbighshire – Sir Robert Salusbury Cotton, 3rd Baronet
- Lord Lieutenant of Pembrokeshire – Sir Arthur Owen, 3rd Baronet
- Lord Lieutenant of Radnorshire – James Brydges, 1st Duke of Chandos
- Bishop of Bangor – Charles Cecil (from 15 January)
- Bishop of Llandaff – John Harris
- Bishop of St Asaph – Thomas Tanner (until 14 December)
- Bishop of St Davids – Nicholas Clagett

== Events ==
- 29 January – The Kemeys baronetcy of Cefn Mabli becomes extinct on the death of Sir Charles Kemeys, 4th Baronet. His property at Cefn Mably is inherited by Sir Charles Tynte, 5th Baronet.
- 20 April – Religious conversion of Howell Harris at Talgarth, marking a beginning of the Welsh Methodist revival.
- September – Griffith Hughes records in his diary that he has broken his "knee pan" while travelling in Pennsylvania on behalf of the Society for the Propagation of the Gospel.
- date unknown – Swansea-born Beau Nash appoints himself Master of Ceremonies at Tunbridge Wells, where a public house is later named after him.

== Arts and literature ==
=== New books ===
- Lewis Morris – Tlysau yr Hen Oesoedd

== Births ==
- 1 March – John Price, librarian (died 1813)
- 24 June – Barbara Herbert, Countess of Powis, posthumous daughter of Lord Edward Herbert (died 1786)
- July – Cecil de Cardonnel, 2nd Baroness Dynevor, peeress (died 1793)

== Deaths ==
- 5 April – Sir Edward Stradling, 5th Baronet, MP for Cardiff and Sheriff of Glamorgan, 62
- July – John Ellis, antiquarian, 61
- 14 December – Thomas Tanner, Bishop of St Asaph, 61
