= 1730s in Wales =

- 1720s | 1740s | Other years in Wales
- Other events of the decade

This article is about the particular significance of the decade 1730–1739 to Wales and its people.

== Events ==
1730
1731
1732
1733
1734
1735
1736
1737
1738
1739

== Arts and literature ==
=== New books ===
1730

- Joseph Harris - A Treatise on Navigation
- James Lewis & Christmas Samuel - Y Cyfrif Cywiraf o'r Pechod Gwreiddiol
- William Wotton (ed.) - Cyfreithjeu Hywel Dda ac eraill, seu Leges Wallicae (Laws of Hywel Dda)

1731

- Humphrey Lhuyd - Britannicae Descriptionis Commentariolum
- Edward Samuel - Athrawiaeth yr Eglwys

1732

- David Evans - The Minister of Christ and his Flock
- Jeremy Owen - Golwg ar y Beiau

1734

- Edmund Curll - The Life of Robert Price ... one of the Justices of His Majesty's Court of Common-Pleas

== Births ==
1731

- date unknown - Siôn Robert Lewis, author and hymn-writer (d. 1806)

1732

- 5 October - Lloyd Kenyon, 1st Baron Kenyon, lawyer and politician (d. 1802)

1734

- 3 July - Henry Herbert, 10th Earl of Pembroke (d. 1794)
- 24 October - Thomas Henry, apothecary (d. 1816)

1736

- date unknown - Thomas Wynn, 1st Baron Newborough, politician (d. 1807)

1737

- 13 May - Thomas Williams of Llanidan, industrialist (d. 1802)
- 31 August - Princess Augusta, eldest child of the Prince and Princess of Wales (d. 1813)
- date unknown - Richard Pennant, 1st Baron Penrhyn, politician and slave-owner (d. 1808)

1738

- 4 June - Prince George, eldest son of the Prince and Princess of Wales (d. 1820)
- date unknown - David Williams, philosopher (d. 1816)

1739

- 14 March - Prince Edward, Duke of York and Albany, second son and third child of the Prince and Princess of Wales (d. 1767)
- date unknown
  - Richard Crawshay, industrialist (d. 1810)
  - Thomas Edwards (Twm o'r Nant), dramatist and poet (d. 1810)

== Deaths ==
1730

- August - Sir William Glynne, 5th Baronet, 21
- December - Owen Gruffydd, poet
- date unknown - Thomas Trevor, 1st Baron Trevor, politician

1731

- 6 April - David Lloyd, Welsh-born American lawyer
- September - Rowland Ellis, Quaker leader (in America)

1732

- 2 February - Robert Price, judge, 79

1733

- 22 January - Thomas Herbert, 8th Earl of Pembroke
- date unknown
  - John Morgan, poet
  - Sir Robert Myddelton, 5th Baronet
  - John Myddelton of Chirk Castle, politician

1734

- 2 June - Francis Gwyn, politician, 85?
- 14 June - John Hanbury, industrialist, 70?
- 13 July - Ellis Wynne, clergyman and writer, 63

1737

- 14 February - Charles Talbot, 1st Baron Talbot, 52
- 20 November - Caroline of Brandenburg-Ansbach, consort of King George II of Great Britain and former Princess of Wales (1714-1727), 54
- date unknown - Guto Nyth Brân, legendary athlete, 37

1738

- 27 September - Sir Thomas Stradling, 28 (in a duel)

1739

- 5 May - Sir Roger Mostyn, 3rd Baronet, 65
