= 1743 in Wales =

- Centuries: 16th; 17th; 18th; 19th; 20th
- Decades: 1720s; 1730s; 1740s; 1750s; 1760s
- See also: List of years in Wales; Timeline of Welsh history 1743 in Great Britain Scotland Elsewhere

Events from the year 1743 in Wales.

== Incumbents ==
- Lord Lieutenant of North Wales (Lord Lieutenant of Anglesey, Caernarvonshire, Denbighshire, Flintshire, Merionethshire, Montgomeryshire) – George Cholmondeley, 3rd Earl of Cholmondeley
- Lord Lieutenant of Glamorgan – Charles Powlett, 3rd Duke of Bolton
- Lord Lieutenant of Brecknockshire and Lord Lieutenant of Monmouthshire – Thomas Morgan
- Lord Lieutenant of Cardiganshire – vacant
- Lord Lieutenant of Carmarthenshire – vacant until 1755
- Lord Lieutenant of Pembrokeshire – Sir Arthur Owen, 3rd Baronet
- Lord Lieutenant of Radnorshire – James Brydges, 1st Duke of Chandos
- Bishop of Bangor – Thomas Herring (until 21 April) Matthew Hutton (from 13 November)
- Bishop of Llandaff – John Gilbert
- Bishop of St Asaph – Isaac Maddox (until May)
- Bishop of St Davids – Edward Willes (2 January - 12 December)

== Events ==
- 2 January - Edward Willes is consecrated Bishop of St David's.
- 21 April - Thomas Herring becomes Archbishop of York and is replaced as Bishop of Bangor by Matthew Hutton. Both men go on to serve as Archbishop of Canterbury.
- 8 June - William Bulkeley completes the first of his diaries.
- November - John Thomas is elected to replace Isaac Maddox as Bishop of St Asaph, but is translated to the bishopric of Lincoln before his consecration and is himself replaced at St Asaph by Samuel Lisle.
- date unknown
  - William Williams (Pantycelyn) is refused ordination as a priest because of his Methodist activities; from this time on he commits himself entirely to the Methodist movement.
  - A notable eisteddfod is held at Llansantffraid Glyn Ceiriog in Powys.
  - Griffith Hughes returns from his travels in America and Barbados, and presents a hitherto unknown substance, asbestos, to the Royal Society.

== Arts and literature ==
=== New books ===
- Daniel Rowland & Ralph Erskine - Traethawd am farw i'r ddeddf, a byw i Dduw

== Births ==
- May - Dafydd Siôn Siâms, musician, poet, and book-binder (died 1831)
- 2 May – William Parry, portrait painter (died 1791)
- 30 July - Philip Yorke, genealogist (died 1804)
- date unknown
  - Abraham Rees, encyclopaedist (died 1825)
  - Sir John Stepney, 8th Baronet, politician (died 1811)

== Deaths ==
- March - Robert Wynne, priest and academic, about 80
- 16 April - Sir John Aubrey, 3rd Baronet, politician, 62
- 15 July - John Wynne, former Bishop of St Asaph and Principal of Jesus College, Oxford, 85
- date unknown - Thomas Morgan, Deist theologian
