= 1734 in Wales =

- Centuries: 16th; 17th; 18th; 19th; 20th
- Decades: 1710s; 1720s; 1730s; 1740s; 1750s
- See also: List of years in Wales; Timeline of Welsh history 1734 in Great Britain Scotland Elsewhere

This article is about the particular significance of the year 1734 to Wales and its people.

== Incumbents ==
- Lord Lieutenant of North Wales (Lord Lieutenant of Anglesey, Caernarvonshire, Flintshire, Merionethshire, Montgomeryshire) – George Cholmondeley, 3rd Earl of Cholmondeley
- Lord Lieutenant of Glamorgan – Charles Powlett, 3rd Duke of Bolton
- Lord Lieutenant of Brecknockshire and Lord Lieutenant of Monmouthshire – Thomas Morgan
- Lord Lieutenant of Cardiganshire – John Vaughan, 2nd Viscount Lisburne
- Lord Lieutenant of Carmarthenshire – vacant until 1755
- Lord Lieutenant of Denbighshire – Sir Robert Salusbury Cotton, 3rd Baronet
- Lord Lieutenant of Pembrokeshire – Sir Arthur Owen, 3rd Baronet
- Lord Lieutenant of Radnorshire – James Brydges, 1st Duke of Chandos
- Bishop of Bangor – Thomas Sherlock (until 8 November); Charles Cecil (from 15 January)
- Bishop of Llandaff – John Harris
- Bishop of St Asaph – Thomas Tanner
- Bishop of St Davids – Nicholas Clagett

== Events ==
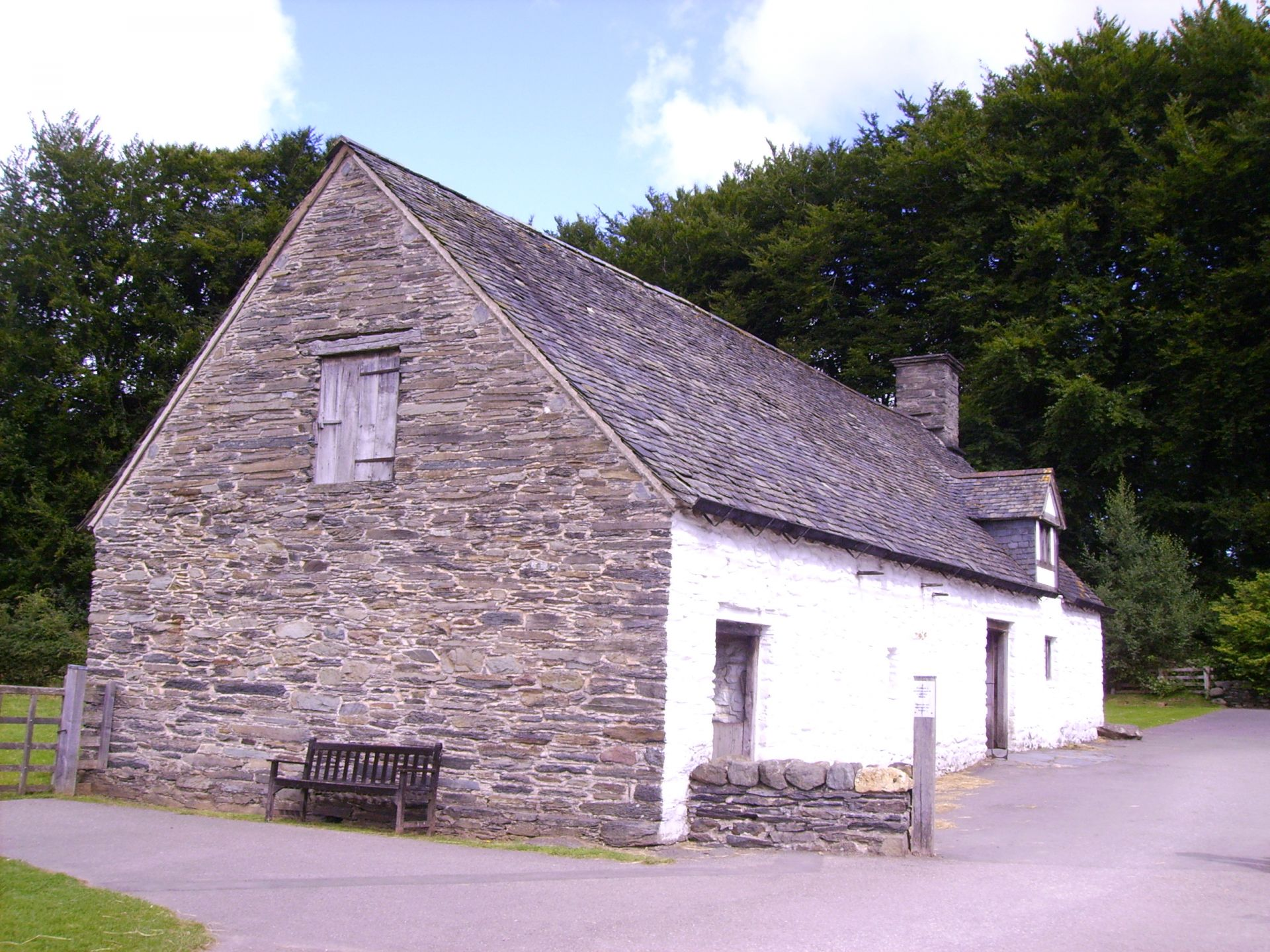
Cilewent Farmhouse at St Fagan's, built in stone in 1734.

- March – In a report to the Society for the Propagation of the Gospel, missionary Griffith Hughes claims to have travelled over 1,100 miles in the Pennsylvania region in the course of his preaching.
- 30 March – First entry in the diary of William Bulkeley.
- date unknown
  - Original construction (in stone) of Cilewent Farmhouse, now located at St Fagans National History Museum.
  - Daniel Rowland marries Eleanor Davies of Caer-llugest and is ordained a deacon.

== Arts and literature ==
=== New books ===
==== English language ====
- Edmund Curll – The Life of Robert Price ... one of the Justices of His Majesty's Court of Common-Pleas

==== Welsh language ====
- Simon Thomas – Athrawiaethau Difinyddawl

== Births ==
- 20 January – Robert Morris, Welsh-born American merchant (died 1806)
- 15 April – Evan Lloyd, poet (died 1776)
- 3 July – Henry Herbert, 10th Earl of Pembroke (died 1794)
- 24 October – Thomas Henry, apothecary (died 1816)

== Deaths ==
- 14 June
  - Francis Gwyn, politician, 85
  - John Hanbury, industrialist, 70?
- 13 July – Ellis Wynne, clergyman and writer, 63
- October – Thomas Lloyd, lexicographer, 61?
- 26 December – Salusbury Lloyd, politician,
- date unknown – Elisha Beadles, South Wales-based Quaker leader, 74?
