= 1742 in Wales =

- Centuries: 16th; 17th; 18th; 19th; 20th
- Decades: 1720s; 1730s; 1740s; 1750s; 1760s
- See also: List of years in Wales; Timeline of Welsh history 1742 in Great Britain Scotland Elsewhere

Events from the year 1742 in Wales.

== Incumbents ==
- Lord Lieutenant of North Wales (Lord Lieutenant of Anglesey, Caernarvonshire, Denbighshire, Flintshire, Merionethshire, Montgomeryshire) – George Cholmondeley, 3rd Earl of Cholmondeley
- Lord Lieutenant of Glamorgan – Charles Powlett, 3rd Duke of Bolton
- Lord Lieutenant of Brecknockshire and Lord Lieutenant of Monmouthshire – Thomas Morgan
- Lord Lieutenant of Cardiganshire – John Vaughan, 2nd Viscount Lisburne
- Lord Lieutenant of Carmarthenshire – vacant until 1755
- Lord Lieutenant of Pembrokeshire – Sir Arthur Owen, 3rd Baronet
- Lord Lieutenant of Radnorshire – James Brydges, 1st Duke of Chandos
- Bishop of Bangor – Thomas Herring
- Bishop of Llandaff – John Gilbert
- Bishop of St Asaph – Isaac Maddox
- Bishop of St Davids – Nicholas Clagett (until 2 August)

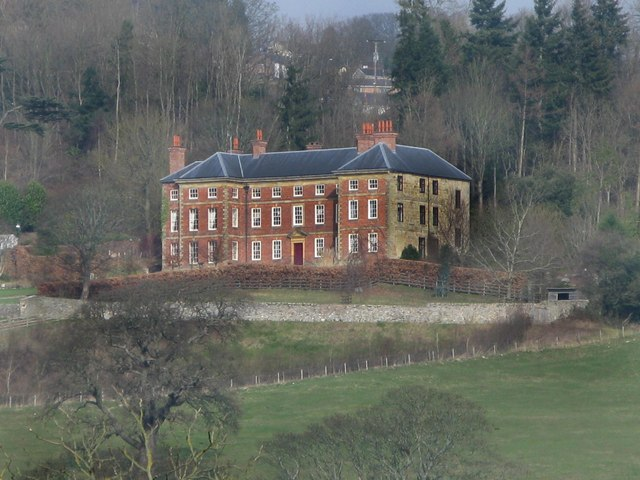
Trevor Hall, rebuilt 1742-3

== Events ==
- 23 February – John Myddelton completes his term as MP for Denbighshire.
- July – Sir Watkin Williams-Wynn, 3rd Baronet vacates his Montgomeryshire seat when the result of the previous year's election for Denbighshire is overturned in his favour.
- Howell Harris, Daniel Rowland and their converts form the Methodist Association in Wales. One of these, William Prichard, is exiled with his family from Glasfryn Fawr and relocates to Plas Penmynydd, Anglesey.
- Rebuilding of Trevor Hall, Denbighshire, begins, following the marriage of Mary and John Lloyd (Pentrehobin).

== Arts and literature ==
=== New books ===
- Richard Farrington – Twenty Sermons
- Morgan John Lewis – Sail, Dibenion, a Rheolau'r Societies

=== Music ===
- John Parry – Antient British Music

== Births ==
- 9 February – David Davies, clergyman and author (died 1819)
- 18 February – John Morgan (of Dderw), politician (died 1792)
- 26 September – Thomas Jones, landscape painter (died 1803)
- 3 December – Sir Erasmus Gower, naval commander (died 1814)
- probable – Watkin Williams, politician (died 1808)

== Deaths ==
- January – Hugh Williams (of Chester), politician, 47?
- 2 March (buried) – Moses Williams, antiquarian scholar, 57
- 6 March – Arthur Bevan, MP, about 54
- June – Jenkin Jones, Arminian clergyman, about 40
- 8 June – Robert Jones, landowner
