= 1739 in Wales =

- Centuries: 16th; 17th; 18th; 19th; 20th
- Decades: 1710s; 1720s; 1730s; 1740s; 1750s
- See also: List of years in Wales; Timeline of Welsh history 1739 in Great Britain Scotland Elsewhere

This article is about the particular significance of the year 1739 to Wales and its people.

== Incumbents ==
- Lord Lieutenant of North Wales (Lord Lieutenant of Anglesey, Caernarvonshire, Flintshire, Merionethshire, Montgomeryshire) – George Cholmondeley, 3rd Earl of Cholmondeley
- Lord Lieutenant of Glamorgan – Charles Powlett, 3rd Duke of Bolton
- Lord Lieutenant of Brecknockshire and Lord Lieutenant of Monmouthshire – Thomas Morgan
- Lord Lieutenant of Cardiganshire – John Vaughan, 2nd Viscount Lisburne
- Lord Lieutenant of Carmarthenshire – vacant until 1755
- Lord Lieutenant of Denbighshire – Sir Robert Salusbury Cotton, 3rd Baronet
- Lord Lieutenant of Pembrokeshire – Sir Arthur Owen, 3rd Baronet
- Lord Lieutenant of Radnorshire – James Brydges, 1st Duke of Chandos
- Bishop of Bangor – Thomas Herring
- Bishop of Llandaff – Matthias Mawson (from 18 February)
- Bishop of St Asaph – Isaac Maddox
- Bishop of St Davids – Nicholas Clagett

== Events ==
- March - Diarist William Bulkeley of Brynddu is a bearer at the funeral of Richard Bulkeley, 5th Viscount Bulkeley, and leaves an account in his diary.
- 20 May - The roof of St Mary's Church, Swansea, collapses into the nave just before a Sunday morning service; the congregation is waiting outside for the officiating priest, who is running late.
- date unknown
  - Samuel and Nathaniel Buck tour Wales to produce the first of their prints of the country, following on from their prints of England.
  - A new parish church is completed at Willington Worthenbury near Wrexham, designed by Richard Trubshaw.

== Arts and literature ==
=== New books ===
- Rowland Ellis - A Salutation to the Britains (2nd London edition)
- John Reynolds - The Scripture Genealogy and Display of Herauldry

== Births ==
- January - Thomas Edwards (Twm o'r Nant), dramatist and poet (died 1810)
- 14 March - Prince Edward, Duke of York and Albany, second son and third child of the Prince and Princess of Wales (died 1767)
- 3 April - Hugh Davies, botanist (died 1821)
- date unknown - Richard Crawshay, industrialist (died 1810)

== Deaths ==
- 5 May - Sir Roger Mostyn, 3rd Baronet, 65
- 6 June - John Griffith, MP for Caernarvonshire, about 52
