= 1744 in Wales =

- Centuries: 16th; 17th; 18th; 19th; 20th
- Decades: 1720s; 1730s; 1740s; 1750s; 1760s
- See also: List of years in Wales; Timeline of Welsh history 1744 in Great Britain Scotland Elsewhere

Events from the year 1744 in Wales.

== Incumbents ==
- Lord Lieutenant of North Wales (Lord Lieutenant of Anglesey, Caernarvonshire, Denbighshire, Flintshire, Merionethshire, Montgomeryshire) – George Cholmondeley, 3rd Earl of Cholmondeley
- Lord Lieutenant of Glamorgan – Charles Powlett, 3rd Duke of Bolton
- Lord Lieutenant of Brecknockshire and Lord Lieutenant of Monmouthshire – Thomas Morgan
- Lord Lieutenant of Cardiganshire – Wilmot Vaughan, 3rd Viscount Lisburne (from 10 May)
- Lord Lieutenant of Carmarthenshire – vacant until 1755
- Lord Lieutenant of Pembrokeshire – Sir Arthur Owen, 3rd Baronet
- Lord Lieutenant of Radnorshire – James Brydges, 1st Duke of Chandos (until 9 August);
- Bishop of Bangor – Matthew Hutton (from 13 November)
- Bishop of Llandaff – John Gilbert
- Bishop of St Asaph – Samuel Lisle (from 1 April)
- Bishop of St Davids – The Hon. Richard Trevor (from 1 April)

== Events ==
- 1 April - The Hon. Richard Trevor is consecrated as Bishop of St David's, replacing Edward Willes. Samuel Lisle is consecrated as Bishop of St Asaph on the same day.
- 18 May - Howell Harris marries Anne Williams.
- date unknown - Richard Morris is selected by the S.P.C.K. to supervise the production of its edition of the Welsh Bible.

== Arts and literature ==
=== New books ===
- Jane Brereton - Poems on several occasions (posthumously published)

=== Music ===
- William Williams Pantycelyn - Aleluia (first collection of hymns)

== Births ==
- 6 August - John Hanbury, ironmaster (died 1784)
- 17 September - Albemarle Bertie, 9th Earl of Lindsey, father of Lady Charlotte Guest (died 1818)
- date unknown
  - Robert Hughes (Robin Ddu yr Ail or Robin Ddu o Fon), poet (died 1785)
  - Richard Philipps, 1st Baron Milford (first creation) (died 1823)

== Deaths ==
- 19 January - Lady Lucy Herbert, writer, 74
- 2 March - William Maxwell, 5th Earl of Nithsdale, Jacobite, husband of Winifred Herbert, 67
- 9 August - James Brydges, 1st Duke of Chandos, Lord Lieutenant of Radnorshire, 71
- 21 September - William Nevill, 16th Baron Bergavenny, about 45
