= 1745 in Wales =

- Centuries: 16th; 17th; 18th; 19th; 20th
- Decades: 1720s; 1730s; 1740s; 1750s; 1760s
- See also: List of years in Wales; Timeline of Welsh history 1745 in Great Britain Scotland Elsewhere

Events from the year 1745 in Wales.

== Incumbents ==
- Lord Lieutenant of North Wales (Lord Lieutenant of Anglesey, Caernarvonshire, Denbighshire, Flintshire, Merionethshire, Montgomeryshire) – George Cholmondeley, 3rd Earl of Cholmondeley
- Lord Lieutenant of Glamorgan – Charles Powlett, 3rd Duke of Bolton
- Lord Lieutenant of Brecknockshire and Lord Lieutenant of Monmouthshire – Thomas Morgan
- Lord Lieutenant of Cardiganshire – Wilmot Vaughan, 3rd Viscount Lisburne
- Lord Lieutenant of Carmarthenshire – vacant until 1755
- Lord Lieutenant of Pembrokeshire – Sir Arthur Owen, 3rd Baronet
- Lord Lieutenant of Radnorshire – vacant
- Bishop of Bangor – Matthew Hutton
- Bishop of Llandaff – John Gilbert
- Bishop of St Asaph – Samuel Lisle
- Bishop of St Davids – The Hon. Richard Trevor

== Events ==
- Following the failure of the Jacobite Rebellion, Sir Watkin Williams-Wynn, 3rd Baronet, is suspected of involvement and seeks protection from his father-in-law, Charles Noel Somerset, 4th Duke of Beaufort.

== Arts and literature ==
=== New books ===
- Anonymous
  - An Expostulatory Epistle to the Welsh Knight..., etc
  - An Apology for the Welsh Knight..., etc

=== Music ===
- Ancient British Music, Part 2 (unpublisher)

== Births ==
- 13 January – Robert Jones, Rhoslan, writer (died 1829)
- 14 February – David Davis (Castellhywel), poet (died 1827)
- 15 July – Sir John Morris, 1st Baronet, industrialist (died 1819)
- date unknown – Thomas Redmond, artist (died 1785)

== Deaths ==
- 22 October – William Herbert, 2nd Marquess of Powis, 80
- date unknown – Erasmus Lewes, Anglican clergyman
