= 1748 in Wales =

- Centuries: 16th; 17th; 18th; 19th; 20th
- Decades: 1720s; 1730s; 1740s; 1750s; 1760s
- See also: List of years in Wales; Timeline of Welsh history 1748 in Great Britain Scotland Elsewhere

Events from the year 1748 in Wales.

== Incumbents ==
- Lord Lieutenant of North Wales (Lord Lieutenant of Anglesey, Caernarvonshire, Flintshire, Merionethshire, Montgomeryshire) – George Cholmondeley, 3rd Earl of Cholmondeley
- Lord Lieutenant of Glamorgan – Charles Powlett, 3rd Duke of Bolton
- Lord Lieutenant of Brecknockshire and Lord Lieutenant of Monmouthshire – Thomas Morgan
- Lord Lieutenant of Cardiganshire – Wilmot Vaughan, 3rd Viscount Lisburne
- Lord Lieutenant of Carmarthenshire – vacant until 1755
- Lord Lieutenant of Denbighshire – Sir Robert Salusbury Cotton, 3rd Baronet (until 27 August); Richard Myddelton (from 20 August)
- Lord Lieutenant of Pembrokeshire – Sir Arthur Owen, 3rd Baronet
- Lord Lieutenant of Radnorshire – William Perry
- Bishop of Bangor – Zachary Pearce (from 21 February)
- Bishop of Llandaff – John Gilbert (until 29 December)
- Bishop of St Asaph – Samuel Lisle (until 17 March) Robert Hay Drummond (from 24 April)
- Bishop of St Davids – The Hon. Richard Trevor

== Events ==
- 8 March - With the death of the childless William Herbert, 3rd Marquess of Powis, the title becomes extinct. Henry Arthur Herbert subsequently becomes 1st Earl of Powis.
- Richard Wilson paints the two eldest sons of Frederick, Prince of Wales.
- Joseph Harris becomes Assay-Master at the Royal Mint.
- A major eisteddfod is held at Selattyn.
- William Williams Pantycelyn marries Mary Francis of Llansawel.
- The Salusbury family leave Lleweni Hall.

== Arts and literature ==
=== New books ===
- Lewis Morris - Plans of Harbours, Bays, and Roads in St. George's and the Bristol Channels

== Births ==
- 1 September - Thomas Johnes, landowner (died 1816)

== Deaths ==
- 8 March - William Herbert, 3rd Marquess of Powis, 50
- 27 August - Sir Robert Salusbury Cotton, 3rd Baronet, 53
- December - John Harris, Sr., Welsh-descended American trader, 75
