= Thomas Beach =

Thomas Beach may refer to:

- Thomas Beach (painter) (1738–1806), English portrait painter
- Thomas Beach (VC) (1824–1864), Scottish Victoria Cross recipient
- Thomas Miller Beach (1841–1894), British spy
- Thomas Boswall Beach (1866–1941), British Army colonel
- Thomas Beach (poet) (died 1737), Welsh merchant and poet
- Thomas Beach (politician) (born 1974), member of the South Carolina House of Representatives

== See also ==
- Tom Beach (born 1955), American gymnast
- Beach (disambiguation)
