= 1734 in Great Britain =

Events from the year 1734 in Great Britain.

== Incumbents ==
- Monarch – George II
- Prime Minister – Robert Walpole (Whig)

== Events ==
- 22 April to 6 June – general election results in Robert Walpole winning his third victory as Prime Minister.

=== Undated ===
- George Sale produces a translation of the Koran into English.
- The Bank of England moves to its continuing location in Threadneedle Street in London.
- Society of Dilettanti founded in London.
- Construction of Holkham Hall in Norfolk begins.

== Births ==
- 24 June – David Brown, merchant and Governor of Tranquebar (died 1804)
- 3 September – Joseph Wright, painter (died 1797)
- 7 October – Sir Ralph Abercromby, general (died 1801)
- 15 December – George Romney, painter (died 1802)

== Deaths ==
- 6 January – John Dennis, dramatist and critic (born 1658)
- 1 February – John Floyer, physician and writer (born 1649)
- 1 March – Roger North, biographer (born 1653)
- 21 March – Robert Wodrow, historian (born 1679)
- 4 May – James Thornhill, painter (born 1675 or 1676)
- 12 June – James FitzJames, 1st Duke of Berwick, illegitimate son of James II of England and French military commander (born 1670 in France; died in Germany)
- 22 July – Peter King, 1st Baron King, Lord Chancellor (born c. 1669)
- 14 November – Louise de Kérouaille, Duchess of Portsmouth, mistress of Charles II of England (born 1649 in France; died in France)
- 6 December – Abigail Masham, Baroness Masham, courtier (born c. 1670)
- 28 December – Robert Roy MacGregor, Scottish clan chief (born 1671)

== See also ==
- 1734 in Wales
