= 1742 in Great Britain =

Events from the year 1742 in Great Britain.

== Incumbents ==
- Monarch – George II
- Prime Minister – Robert Walpole (Whig) (until 11 February); Spencer Compton, 1st Earl of Wilmington (Whig) (starting 16 February)

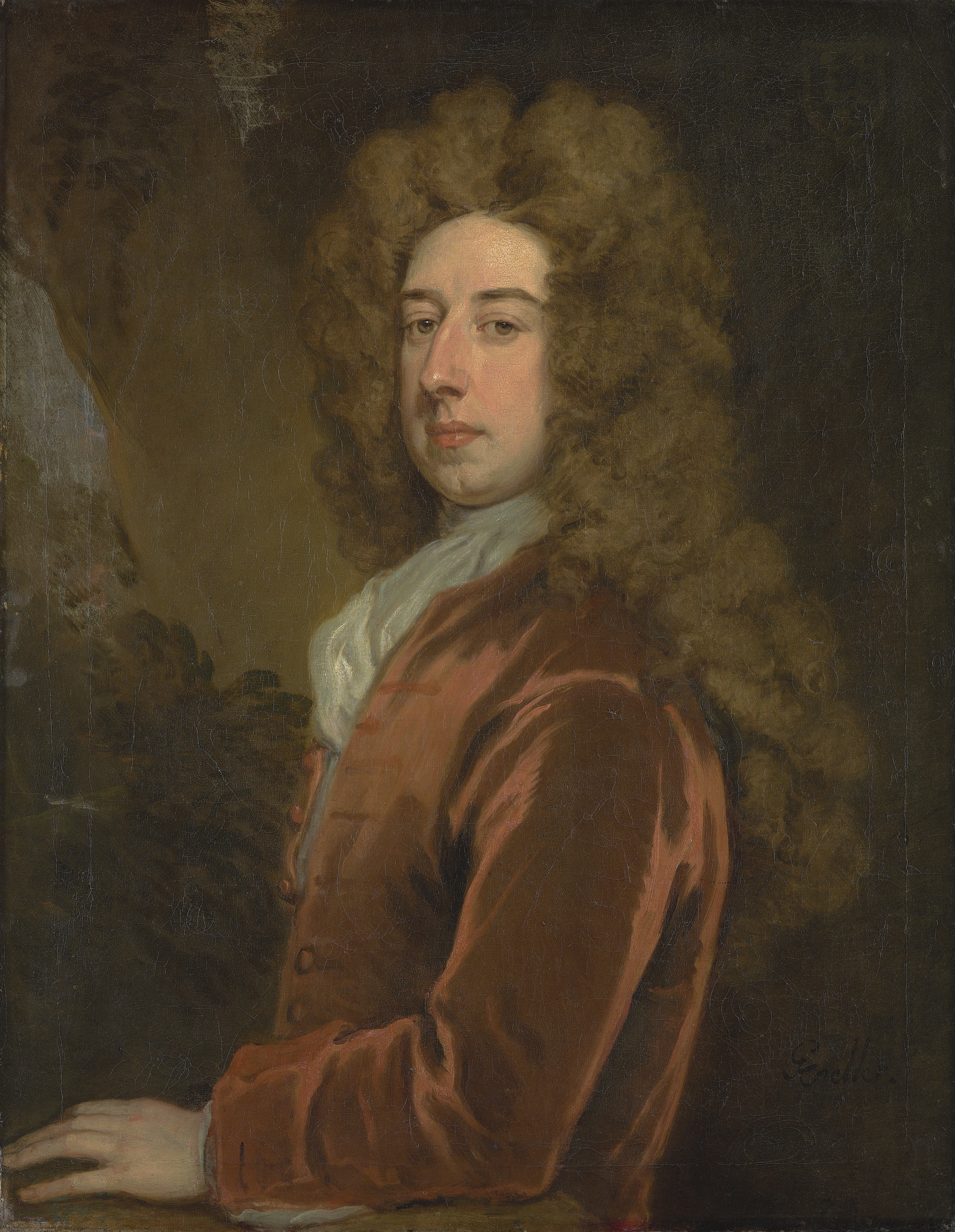
Spencer Compton, 1st Earl of Wilmington, Great Britain's second prime minister. 1710 portrait by Godfrey Kneller.

== Events ==
- January – the House of Commons votes on the alleged rigging of the Chippenham by-election. It becomes a motion of no confidence which leads to the resignation of Robert Walpole.
- 9 January – Robert Walpole made Earl of Orford and resigns as First Lord of the Treasury and Chancellor of the Exchequer. On his formally relinquishing office five days later, he will have served 20 years and 314 days as Prime Minister, the longest single term ever, and also longer than the accumulated terms of any other British Prime Minister.
- 14 January – Edmond Halley dies at Greenwich aged 85; he is succeeded as Astronomer Royal by James Bradley.
- 12 February – John Carteret, 2nd Lord Carteret becomes Secretary of State for the Northern Department.
- 16 February – Spencer Compton, 1st Earl of Wilmington becomes Prime Minister of Great Britain.
- 18 February – British attack La Guayra.
- 13 April – George Frideric Handel's oratorio The Messiah is first performed in Dublin.
- 6 May – 150 houses in the Northamptonshire town of Stony Stratford are consumed by a fire, the second in 6 years.
- 28 May – opening in London of first known British bagnio to offer a swimming pool.
- 7 July – War of Jenkins' Ear: British troops defeat those of Spain in the Battle of Bloody Marsh in the Province of Georgia.
- 14 July – William Pulteney is created 1st Earl of Bath.
- 19 August – A British fleet led by Commodore William Martin enters the harbor of Naples with three warships, two frigates, and four bomb vessels, and sends a message giving the King Charles VII of Naples (the future King Charles III of Spain) 30 minutes to agree to withdraw Neapolitan troops from the Spanish Army. Don Carlos agrees and ends the threat of a Spanish foothold in Italy.
- 27 August – George Anson, captain of HMS Centurion, arrives with his seriously ill crew at the island of Tinian (in the Northern Mariana Islands).
- 16 September – construction starts on the Foundling Hospital in London.

== Publications ==
- Henry Fielding's novel Joseph Andrews (published anonymously, 22 February).
- Charles Jervas' translation of Don Quixote (published posthumously under the name "Jarvis").
- Edward Young's poetry The Complaint, or, Night-Thoughts on Life, Death and Immortality (first three parts; published anonymously).

== Births ==
- 1 January – Isaac Reed, Shakespearean editor (died 1807)
- 8 January – Philip Astley, circus organiser (died 1814)
- 15 March (bapt.) – John Stackhouse, Cornish-born botanist (died 1819)
- 25 March – William Combe, born William Combes, writer, poet and adventurer (died 1823)
- 28 April – Henry Dundas, statesman (died 1811)
- 26 December (bapt.) – George Chalmers, Scottish-born antiquarian (died 1825)

== Deaths ==
- 1 January – Peregrine Bertie, 2nd Duke of Ancaster and Kesteven, statesman (born 1686)
- 14 January – Edmond Halley, astronomer (born 1656)
- 22 February – Charles Rivington, publisher (born 1688)
- 2 April – James Douglas, physician and anatomist (born 1675)
- 18 June – John Aislabie, politician (born 1670)
- 27 June – Nathan Bailey, philologist and lexicographer (year of birth unknown)
- 9 July – John Oldmixon, historian (born 1673)
- 14 July – Richard Bentley, scholar and critic (born 1662)
- 19 July – William Somervile, poet (born 1675)

== See also ==
- 1742 in Wales
