= 1744 in Great Britain =

Events from the year 1744 in Great Britain.

== Incumbents ==
- Monarch – George II
- Prime Minister – Henry Pelham (Whig)

== Events ==
- 10–11 February (22–23 February New Style) – War of the Austrian Succession: British fleet defeated by a Franco-Spanish fleet at the Battle of Toulon with loss of the fire ship HMS Anne Galley and all her crew.
- 27 February – a planned French invasion of Britain fails when a violent storm partially wrecks the French invasion force attempting to cross from Dunkirk to Maldon.
- 4–15 March – War of the Austrian Succession: France declares war on Britain.
- 3 October – HMS Victory (1737) is wrecked on the Casquets in the Channel Islands with the loss of around 900 lives.
- 28 December–8 January 1745 – War of the Austrian Succession: The Quadruple Alliance of Britain, Austria, Saxony-Poland and the United Netherlands is formed against Prussia.
- Undated
  - Northampton General Hospital established as Northampton Infirmary.
  - Mineral springs discovered at Thorp Spa in the West Riding of Yorkshire by John Shires.

== Publications ==
- April – Eliza Haywood's monthly The Female Spectator begins publication, the first periodical written for women by a woman.
- Samuel Johnson's biography of Richard Savage.
- John Newbery's children's book A Little Pretty Pocket-Book.
- Tommy Thumb's Pretty Song Book, containing the earliest known printed versions of many nursery rhymes.
- William Williams Pantycelyn's first collection of Welsh hymns Aleluia (first part).
- The first known Laws of cricket.
- First definitive version of the national anthem God Save the King in Thesaurus Musicus.

== Births ==
- 13 February – David Allan, painter (died 1796)
- 19 May – Charlotte of Mecklenburg-Strelitz, queen of George III of Great Britain (died 1818)
- 21 May – Samuel Ireland, author and engraver (died 1800)
- 31 May – Richard Lovell Edgeworth, politician, writer and inventor (died 1817)

== Deaths ==
- 14 February – John Hadley, mathematician and inventor (born 1682)
- 4 March – John Anstis, herald (born 1669)
- 30 May – Alexander Pope, writer (born 1688)
- 29 June – John Eames, dissenting tutor (born 1686)
- 9 August – James Brydges, 1st Duke of Chandos, patron of the arts (born 1673)
- 18 October – Sarah Churchill, Duchess of Marlborough, friend of Queen Anne (born 1660)

== See also ==
- 1744 in Wales
