= Robert Clavering =

English bishop (1676–1747)

The Right Reverend Robert Clavering
- Bishop of Peterborough
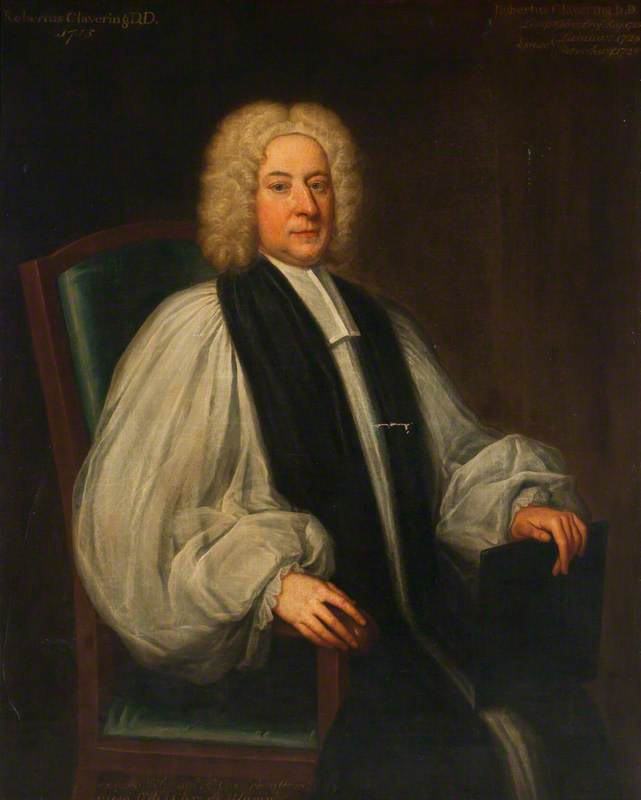
- Portrait by Thomas Gibson
- Diocese: Diocese of Peterborough
- In office: 1729–1747
- Predecessor: White Kennett
- Successor: John Thomas
- Other post: Bishop of Llandaff (1724–1729)

Orders
- Ordination: 19 May 1698 by John Hough
- Consecration: 2 January 1725 by William Wake

Personal details
- Born: 1676
- Died: 21 July 1747
- Denomination: Anglican
- Spouse: Mary Cook
- Education: University of Edinburgh; Lincoln College, Oxford

Robert Clavering (1676 – 21 July 1747) was an English bishop and Hebraist.

== Life ==
He graduated B.A. from the University of Edinburgh, and then went to Lincoln College, Oxford. He was Fellow and tutor of University College, in 1701. In 1714 he was rector of Bocking, Essex. In 1715 he became Regius Professor of Hebrew and canon of Christ Church, Oxford.

He became rector of Marsh Gibbon in 1719. He was Bishop of Llandaff from 1724 to 1729, and then Bishop of Peterborough from 1729 to his death.

== Works ==
At Oxford he published a translation of selections from the Mishneh Torah of Maimonides: "Yad," "Hilkot Talmud Torah" and "Teshubah" (1705).

== Notes ==
Academic offices
Preceded by Roger Altham	Regius Professor of Hebrew at Oxford; 1715–1747	Succeeded by Thomas Hunt
Church of England titles
Preceded by John Tyler	Dean of Hereford; 1706–1729	Succeeded by John Harris
Preceded by John Tyler	Bishop of Llandaff; 1724–1729	Succeeded by John Harris
Preceded by White Kennett	Bishop of Peterborough; 1729–1747	Succeeded by John Thomas
