= David Ellis (priest) =

David Ellis (31 August 1736 – 1795) was a Welsh Anglican clergyman, poet and transcriber of manuscripts.

== Life ==
Ellis was born to Ellis and Elizabeth David, of Dolgellau, north Wales. After attending the school in Ystrad Meurig, he studied at Jesus College, Oxford, but only from March to June 1764. He was then ordained deacon (1764) and priest (1765), serving as curate in Llanberis, Llangeinwen, Derwen and Amlwch before his appointment as vicar of Llanberis in 1788. In the following year, he became vicar of Criccieth, holding the post until his death. In addition to his clerical duties, Ellis wrote poetry and translated works by others from English into Welsh. He also transcribed many Welsh manuscripts, some of which are now preserved in the National Library of Wales. His burial at Criccieth took place on 11 May 1795.
