= Jenkin Jones (pastor) =

Welsh Arminian pastor and writer

Personal life
- Born: 1700 Llanwenog
- Died: 20 June 1742

Religious life
- Religion: Christianity

Jenkin Jones (1700?–1742), was a Welsh Arminian pastor and writer.

== Biography ==
Jenkin Jones was born about 1700, was son of John Jenkins of Bryngranod, Llanwenog, Cardiganshire, and according to a custom common until lately in the principality, adopted his father's Christian name as his own surname. The father, who is said to have been a blacksmith by trade, owned some land, and when he died, 18 March 1759, he left among other legacies one of £100 to endow Llwynrhydowen, the chapel founded by his son.

Jones in 1721 entered the Presbyterian College, Carmarthen, then under Thomas Perrot, a president whose own orthodoxy was unquestioned, but many of whose pupils subsequently drifted into heterodoxy. In 1723 Jones translated into Welsh and saw through the press Matthew Mead's Almost Christian tried and cast, which was published at Carmarthen in 1723. William Spurrell, in his History of Carmarthen, erroneously describes it as the first book printed there.

On leaving college, Jones seems to have become co-pastor with James Lewis of the congregation at Pantycreuddin, Llandysul, Cardiganshire. His views soon inclined to Arminianism, and although his following was large, the majority of the congregation opposed his teaching. He therefore resigned his co-pastorate, and founded in 1726 Llwynrhydowen, the first Arminian church in the principality, and the first church established in the interests of free religious thought. For some years he was the only public advocate of Arminianism in Wales, though many of the younger ministers and Carmarthen students were probably in secret sympathy with him.

In Whit week 1729 the spread of Arminian views was the subject of serious discussion at a meeting of the associated ministers at Llangloffan in Pembrokeshire, when it was resolved that certain works should be published "to counteract the Arminian doctrines which were then beginning to disturb the churches." Towards the close of the year an anonymous pamphlet appeared professing to give from the Arminian point of view a "Correct Account of Original Sin." It was attributed to Jones, but no copy is now known to be extant. It evoked numerous replies, among them one by Jones's old pastor, James Lewis, in conjunction with the Rev. Christmas Samuel, with the title, The most Correct Account of Original Sin, 1730.

Jones's congregation increased, and six or seven influential ministers, together with their congregations, adopted his opinions. He died in 1742, in the mid-day of life, according to his elegy, and was buried on 4 June in the parish churchyard at Llandysul. He married a daughter of David Thomas of Pant-y-defaid, Cardiganshire.

== Works ==
Jones published, besides the works mentioned:

- Dydd y Farn Fawr (i.e. The Day of Great Judgment), translation of a work by the Rev. Thomas Vincent, M.A., Carmarthen, 1727.
- Catecismau; preface dated 2 August 1732.
- Hymnau Cymmwys i Addoliad Duw, ynghyd a'i Farwnad [elegy] gan Evan Thomas Rees, Carmarthen, 1768; edited by his son-in-law and successor in the ministry, David Lloyd.

Other works are attributed without authority to Jones in Rowlands's Cambrian Bibliography.

== Notes and references ==
- This article incorporates text from a publication now in the public domain: Jones, R.M.J. (1885). "Jones, Jenkin". Dictionary of National Biography. Vol. 30. p. 121.
