= Enoch Francis =

Welsh Baptist minister

Enoch Francis (1688–1740) was a Welsh Baptist minister.

Francis was born in 1688 at Pantyllaethdy, on the banks of the Teifi, and began to preach in 1707. He was settled first at Capel Iago, Llanbyther, but removed in 1730 to Newcastle Emlyn, Carmarthenshire. He became one of the most popular and successful ministers of his denomination. He was moderator of the baptist association at Hengoed, Glamorganshire, in 1730, "but the meeting", says Thomas, "was uncomfortable. There were very warm debates upon general redemption and other articles connected with it. Mr. E. Francis had work enough to moderate some tempers".

He died 4 Feb. 1739–40. Mary, his wife, died 23 Aug. 1739, aged 49, and the inscription on the tomb tells us "Enoch walked with God"; "Mary has chosen the better part". The historian of the baptists concludes his memoir with an elegy by Jenkin Thomas, Drewen.

== Publications ==
- The Work and Reward of the Faithful Minister of the Gospel, 1729.
- A Word in Season, 1733.

He was also the author of some of the association letters; that of 1734 is specially mentioned.
