= Mathias Maurice =

Mathias Maurice (1684 – 1 September 1738) was a Welsh minister and writer.

== Career ==
He initially joined Henllan Amgoed chapel before going to William Evans in Carmarthen to become a minister. In 1713, Mathias was briefly minister at Olney, before succeeding Richard Davis in Rothwell.

In 1726, Maurice wrote Byr a chywir Hanes Eglwys Rhydyceished yn eu Nheulltuad o Henllan, trwy y Blynyddoedd 1707, 1708, 1709, a short pamphlet on the history of Rhydyceished church, printed in 1727 in Maurice's book Y Wir Eglwys ('the true church'). This was answered by Jeremy Owen's pamphlet Golwg ar y Beiau (1732). Other writings by Mathias Maurice include Social Religion Exemplify'd (1759), Monuments of Mercy (1729) and A modern question affirmed and approved (1739). Social Religion Exemplify'd had seven editions published by 1860 was translated into Welsh by Evan Evans in 1862.

== Personal life ==
Mathias was born in Llanddewi-Velfrey, Pembrokeshire, the son of a tailor. He wife was Elisabeth Maurice. Mathis died in Rothwell in 1738. His widow lived up to age 73 and died on 8 October 1771.

== See also ==
Llyfryddiaeth y Cymry 1711, 1720, 1727, 1733, 1734, 1759
