= Fortunatus Wright =

British merchant and privateer

- Born: 1712; Wallasey, Cheshire, England
- Died: 1757 (aged 44–45)
- Occupations: Merchant, privateer

Fortunatus Wright (c.1712–1757) was a British merchant and privateer, notable for his activities in the Mediterranean Sea during the War of the Austrian Succession and the Seven Years' War.

== Early life ==
Wright was apparently a native of Wallasey, then in Cheshire, England. He was the son of master mariner and ship owner John Wright (d. 1717). After going to sea as a boy, he settled down as a brewer and distiller and married Martha Painter in 1732. They had several children, including a daughter, Philippa. His wife died shortly after Philippa's birth, and in 1736 Wright married Mary Bulkeley, a daughter of William Bulkeley of Anglesey. Their daughter Ann was born the next year. The marriage was unhappy, and in 1741, Wright abandoned his wife and travelled to Italy.

== War of the Austrian Succession ==
After being arrested in Lucca for refusing to give up his guns and pointing one at a guard, Wright settled in Livorno and became a merchant. In January 1744, his ship Swallow was captured and ransomed at sea. Wright and other Livorno merchants fitted out the privateer Fame and by 1746, he had reportedly captured sixteen enemy ships worth as much as 400,000 pounds (a number perhaps greatly exaggerated, as Wright was never rich). Wright's capture of a French ship in December 1746 carrying the baggage of the Prince of Campo Florido (the Spanish ambassador to France) led to a dispute over whether a pass from King George to the Prince covered his luggage; English authorities in Italy decided that it did, and Wright was forced to give up a portion of what he had seized. Another capture by the Fame, that of the French Hermione on 26 February 1746/7, led to a dispute over Turkish property on board. Wright was jailed by authorities in Tuscany in December 1747 for refusing to turn over profits from the sale, but was freed in June 1748.

After the war, Wright and fellow Englishman William Hutchinson bought and fitted out the 20-gun Lowestoft for trading, and Hutchinson captained it on a number of voyages to the West Indies and in the Mediterranean.

== Seven Years War ==
When war broke out again in May 1756, Wright had a new ship ready for action, the St. George. Local authorities attempted to restrain Wright, but finally allowed him to leave port with a few guns on the St. George and four merchant vessels; once offshore, Wright moved armaments which he had hidden in the merchant cargoes to the St. George and prepared his ship for battle. French merchants of Marseilles had outfitted a warship specifically to destroy Wright, but Wright managed to put the French ship to flight, although the St. George was damaged and he was forced to return to port. The local authorities in Livorno seized his ship and all other English shipping in an effort to maintain neutrality; they were not freed until September when two English warships forced their release by the Tuscan government.

After an unsuccessful attempt to recruit men in Malta, Wright took several prizes which were sent to Cagliari. He was largely successful in several engagements off Malta with the French Hirondelle, sent to halt his activities. The St. George and Wright were probably lost at sea in early 1757, by one report on 16 March. Most of Wright's estate went to his daughter Philippa, who was married to Charles Evelyn, grandson of the writer and diarist John Evelyn.

== Legacy ==
Wright was celebrated in his time and afterwards for his successful privateering. William Hutchinson, who served under him, wrote admiringly of his seamanship and bravery. Tobias Smollett called him "this brave corsair" in his 1825 History of England, while Gomer Williams in his 1897 History of the Liverpool Privateers wrote "...he strikes the imagination as the ideal and ever-victorious captain, around whose name and fate clings the halo of mystery and romance." He is mentioned in James Joyce's Finnegans Wake.
