= Erasmus Lewes =

Welsh Anglican clergyman

Erasmus Lewes (1663 or 1664 – 1745) was a Welsh Anglican clergyman, copies of some of whose sermons are held by the National Library of Wales.

== Life ==
Lewes was the youngest son of John Lewes, a clergyman from Llangunllo, Wales, and was born in 1663 or 1664 (since when he matriculated at Jesus College, Oxford in February 1684, he was said to be 20 years old). Lewes graduated from the University of Oxford in 1688 and was thereafter ordained, beycoming vicar of Roch in Pembrokeshire in 1692 and vicar of Brawdy in the same county in 1694. In the following year, he was made rector of Betws Bledrws and vicar of Lampeter, Cardiganshire. He died on 19 February 1745 and was commemorated with a memorial stone in the church at Lampeter. Handwritten copies of some of his sermons, in English, are held by the National Library of Wales, which also holds other notes written by him in Latin and in English.
