= Edward Willes (bishop) =

English bishop (1693–1773)

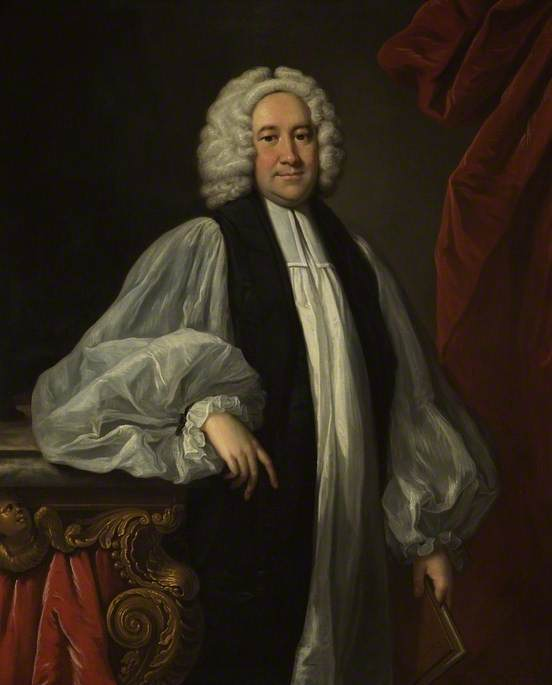
Edward Willes, Bishop of Bath and Wells

Edward Willes (6 March 1693 – 24 November 1773) was an Anglican bishop who was Bishop of St David's and later Bishop of Bath and Wells and one of the most prominent English cryptanalysts of his time.

== Life ==
He was born in Warwickshire son of the Rev John Willes and his wife Anne (or Mary) Walker, daughter of Sir William Walker, Mayor of Oxford. They belonged to a junior branch of the long-established Willes family of Newbold Comyn; Sir John Willes, the long-serving Chief Justice of the Common Pleas, was his brother. He was educated at Oriel College, Oxford and graduated with a BA degree in 1712. While there he learned cryptography from William Blencowe.

In 1716 he became a Decipherer for George II, and distinguished himself by deciphering messages between Swedish diplomats which were sympathetic to the Jacobite cause. He was rewarded by the government by being granted the living of Barton in the Clay, Bedfordshire, which he held between 1718 and 1730.

He subsequently deciphered the correspondence between Francis Atterbury, Bishop of Rochester, and Jacobite exiles abroad between 1719 and 1722. His evidence at the trial secured the conviction and exile of Atterbury, and led to his being appointed a Canon of Westminster Abbey. He was Dean of Lincoln 1730–1743.

In 1743 he became bishop of St. Davids and in 1744 he became Bishop of Bath and Wells. During his episcopate he undertook some repairs to the Bishop's Palace in Wells.

By his wife Jane, Willes had five sons and four daughters. He was a popular and respected man: one of his sons was reportedly told by the Earl of Chesterfield that he should try to imitate his father in everything.

Willes died in London in 1773, and is buried in Westminster Abbey.

== Notes ==
Church of England titles
Preceded by Edward Gee	Dean of Lincoln; 1730–1743	Succeeded by Thomas Cheney
Preceded by Nicholas Clagett	Bishop of St David's; 1743	Succeeded by Richard Trevor
Preceded by John Wynne	Bishop of Bath and Wells; 1743–1773	Succeeded by Charles Moss
