= David Davis (Castellhywel) =

Welsh minister and poet (1745–1827)

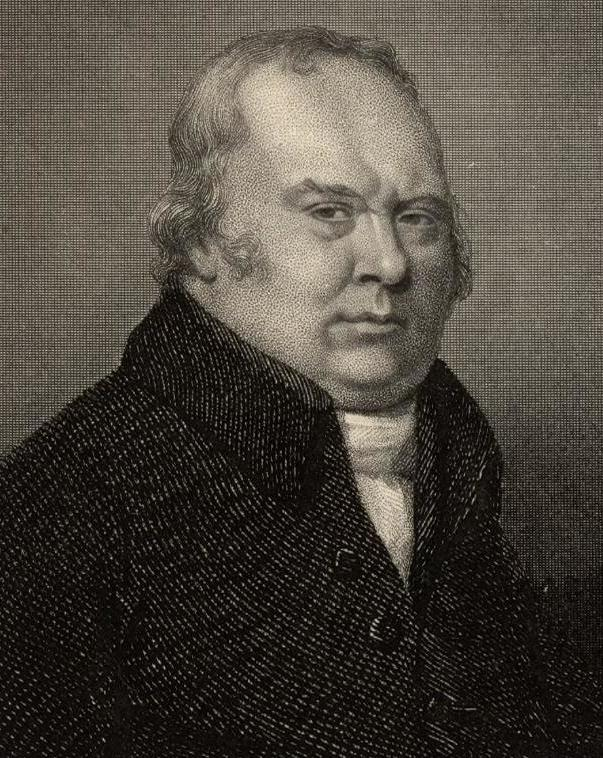
David Davis

David Davis (14 February 1745 – 3 July 1827), known as "Castellhywel" or "Dafis Castellhywel" to differentiate him from others of the same name, was a Welsh minister and poet.

He was born at Goetre Farm in Llangybi, Cardiganshire, and educated at Carmarthen Academy. He became a minister at Ciliau Aeron, where he married the local squire's daughter. In about 1782 he moved to Castellhywel in the Cletwr valley, where he opened a school.

== Works ==
- Cri Carcharor dan farn Marwolaeth (1792)
- Telyn Dewi (1824)
