= Jane Brereton =

Welsh writer in English

Jane Brereton (1685–1740) was a Welsh poet who wrote in English. She was notable as a correspondent for The Gentleman's Magazine.

== Biography ==
Jane was born in 1685, the daughter of Thomas Hughes of Bryn Gruffydd, near Mold, Flintshire, and his wife Anne Jones. Unusually for a girl at the time, Jane was educated at least up to the age of 16, when her father died. She showed an early interest in poetry.

In January 1711, she married Thomas Brereton, at the time a commoner of Brasenose College, Oxford. Her husband soon spent his fortune and went over to Paris. Some time after that, a separation took place and she retired in 1721 to Flintshire, where she led a solitary life, seeing little company other than some intimate friends. About that time Thomas Brereton obtained from Charles Spencer, 3rd Earl of Sunderland a post belonging to the customs at Parkgate, Cheshire, but in February 1722 he was drowned in the River Dee at Saltney, when the tide was coming in. His widow then retired to Wrexham for the benefit of her children's education, where she died 7 August 1740, aged 55, leaving two daughters, Lucy and Charlotte.

== Verses ==
Brereton possessed talents for versification, if not for poetry, which she displayed for some years as a correspondent to The Gentleman's Magazine, under the pseudonym Melissa. There she had a competitor who signed himself FIDO and is supposed to have been Thomas Beach. After her death a volume of her Poems on Several Occasions; with letters to her friends; and an account of her life, was published in London in 1744. A number of her poems were reprinted in subsequent collections.

Katherine Turner, writing in the Oxford Dictionary of National Biography notes that "Brereton's body of poetry displays a flair for tactful occasional writing, and represents a transitional moment in women's writing in the 18th century, a moment at which being a published writer while retaining respectability was becoming a real possibility."

=== Selected works ===
- The Fifth Ode of the Fourth Book of Horace Imitated: And Apply'd to the King. London: William Hinchcliffe, 1716 (Foxon B408)
- An Expostulary Epistle to Sir Richard Steele upon the Death of Mr. Addison. London: William Hinchliffe, 1720 (Foxon B408)
- Merlin: A Poem. London: Edward Cave, 1735 (Foxon B409)
- Poems on Several Occasions. London: Edward Cave, 1744
