= Griffith Hughes =

Welsh cleric and naturalist

- Born: 1707; Tywyn, Merioneth
- Died: 1758 (aged 50–51)
- Education: St John's College, Oxford
- Occupations: Cleric; Author
- Known for: The Natural History of Barbados
- Title: Reverend
- Parent(s): Edward and Bridget Hughes

Griffith Hughes (1707 – c.1758), FRS, was a Welsh naturalist, clergyman, and author. Hughes wrote The Natural History of Barbados, which included the first description of the grapefruit (also known as "The Forbidden Fruit"). His work was praised by Linnaeus, but it has also been considered a "scientific fraud".

== Biography ==
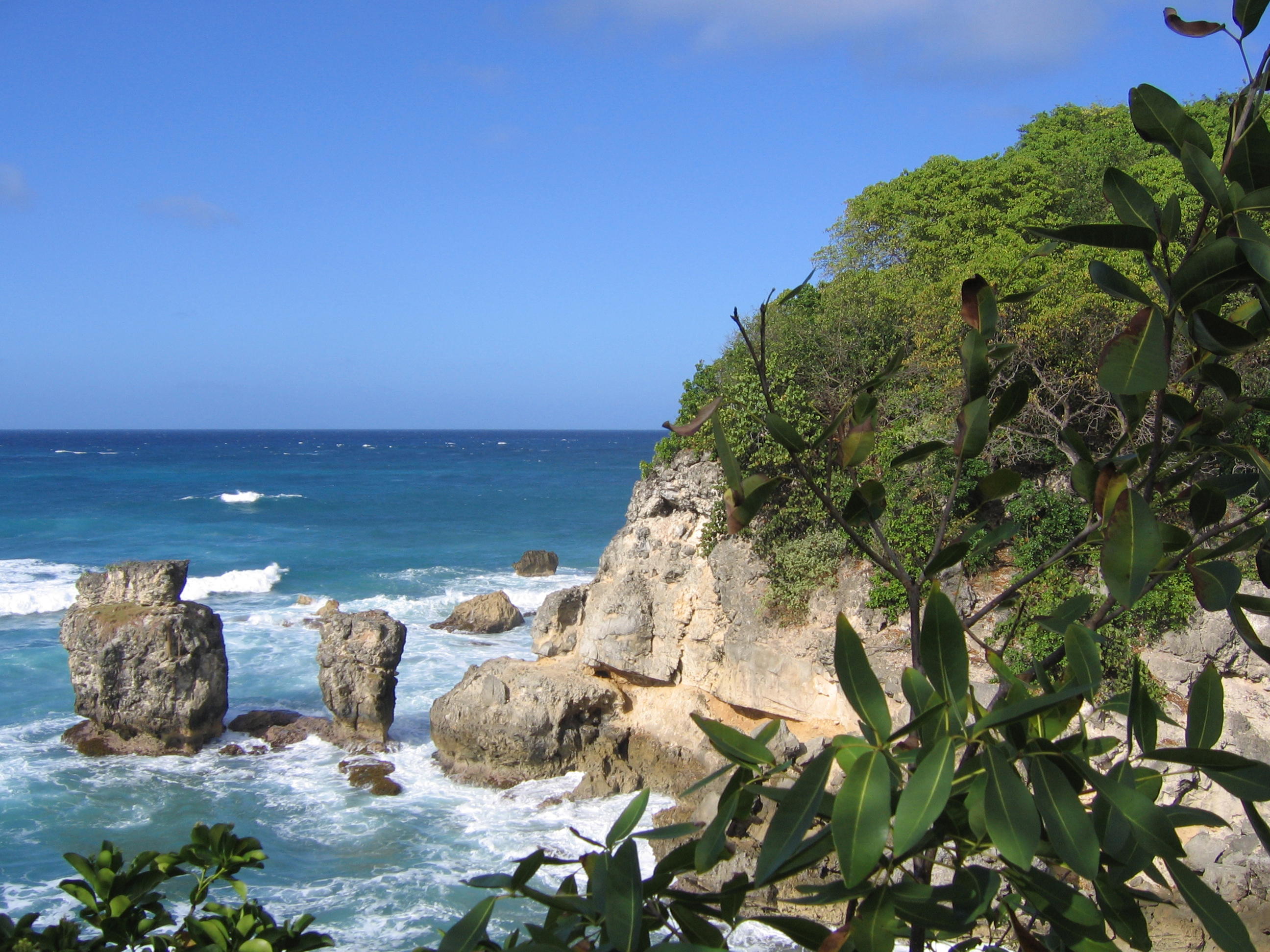
Coastline of St. Lucy's Parish, Barbados

Hughes was born in 1707, the son of Edward and Bridget Hughes of Tywyn, Merioneth, Wales, and christened on 29 April. Hughes attended St John's College, Oxford from May 1729 (although he does not appear to have taken a degree at this time), and he was ordained in London, England in 1732, and turned to the church for orders. He led Welsh congregations in Radnor and Evansburg, Pennsylvania, from 1733 to 1736, from which he traveled extensively each week to share the gospel primarily in Welsh. 1736 Hughes left Pennsylvania for Barbados, where he was assigned to St. Lucy's Parish as rector. From this location, he returned to London. He published his findings first in an article in Philosophical Transactions of the Royal Society in 1743/4. While there, he attended a winter meeting of the Society for the Propagation of the Gospel. He was next seen in London five years later, which coincides with his selection as a Fellow of the Royal Society. Later that same year, he was conferred BA and MA from Oxford. While listed as rector of St. Lucy's, Barbados, until 1750, it is unclear how much time he spent there, given his return to London in 1743. The Royal Society documents indicate that he resided in London in 1748, possibly in connection with his work at Oxford. The termination of St. Lucy's rectorship coincides with the publication of his book, a work supported by other artisans then in the King's service. The Royal Society indicates his presence for ten years following his 1748 selection. There are no known records of him marrying, and his land claims in Pennsylvania were abandoned while he was in Barbados. The whereabouts of Hughes from 1758 onward are unknown.

=== Pennsylvania mission ===
The Society for the Propagation of the Gospel in Foreign Parts (SPG) supported his efforts to join the Anglican mission in colonial Pennsylvania with two Welsh congregations, St. David's in Radnor and St. James Perkiomen in Evansburg. He was appointed by the SPG in October 1732 at an annual salary of £60 and arrived in Pennsylvania early that winter. By March 1734, he claimed in a report to the SPG to have traveled over 1,100 miles (1,800 km) in the Pennsylvania backcountry to serve various congregations, including one in the newly organized Lancaster County. In September 1735 he reported that he broke his "knee pan" while travelling.

Hughes believed providing Welsh language books and tracts to his congregations was a key task. In December 1734, he volunteered to return to London to help translate and publish more material but was turned down by the SPG. Hughes published a tract on "The Last Four Things" in Welsh in Pennsylvania under the title Myfyrdodau Bucheddol ar y Pedwar Peth Diweddaf. Still, copies of the 150 printed then have yet to be located at his own expense. He appears to have added some of his ideas to the original material provided by the brother of his hometown vicar, John Morgan. Passing remarks in correspondence will indicate Hughes' services were in extremely high demand but could not meet the demand. Hughes' arrival in this part of Pennsylvania provided a Welsh rector to a region that had been starved of this service for several years. A dying parishioner thought highly enough of Hughes to provide a horse – "one bright bay young mare with a star on her forehead" – for him in his will in late summer 1734. He began the process of acquiring 400 acres (1.6 km^{2}) of land in Berks County and another 405 acres (1.64 km^{2}) in Lancaster County.

In June 1736, Hughes reported that because of his deteriorating health, aggravated by lengthy journeys to Caernarvon, Newtown, and Evansburg, he had traveled to Barbados, stayed there for three months, and accepted a post at St. Lucy's Parish there. He then returned to Pennsylvania for four months. His departure was sudden and controversial, and an audit was conducted by St. David's after his departure. Pleasants complains of the "desertion of his mission and unceremonious withdrawal" and relates a legend that his departure from Barbados was similarly sudden. His congregation at St. James complained in a letter to the SPG that "Mr. Hughes very seldom came near us," and of unspecified "misbehaviours." Hughes was the last clergyman at St. David's to preach regularly in Welsh.

In 1743, Hughes presented asbestos, a material he brought from Pennsylvania, to the Royal Society. This was long before there were industrial applications for this substance.

=== Research on Barbados ===
While in Barbados, he recorded observations of the natural features, plants, and wildlife over several years. These observations were included in his follow-on publication. Hughes' arrival on Barbados coincides with the completion of Codrington College and the expanding influence of the Royal Society in that locale. What is also clear is the extensive correspondence that Hughes used to guide him on his journey, including patronage support at publication. His St. Lucy's rectorship kept him insulated while on the island and allowed him access to these resources as required. From this ("leeward") continental island location, he probably returned to England in 1743 and 1748, as he was present at meetings held by the SPG in 1743 and the Royal Society during 1748. The first return coincides with his paper entitled "Of a Zoophyton resembling the Flower of a Marigold," provided to Philosophical Transactions, the first scientific publication from Barbados. His 1748 return finds him taking his BA and MA degrees from Oxford. On 9 June that year, he was elected a Fellow of the Royal Society.

=== Return to London ===
Hughes is remembered for his work The Natural History of Barbados, published in London in 1750. This 314-page volume was organised into ten books and contains 29 plates, or pictures from Georg Dionysius Ehret and others. The text includes the following observations. In Portuguese, the name Barbados means bearded and probably describes the fig tree filament growth into the soil. In addition to the fig tree, Hughes describes the many uses, including medicinal, of the vegetation found on the island. One such example is the first description of the grapefruit, which Hughes called "The Forbidden Fruit". The term yellow fever was also coined by Hughes in this volume, although the association with the mosquito came much later.

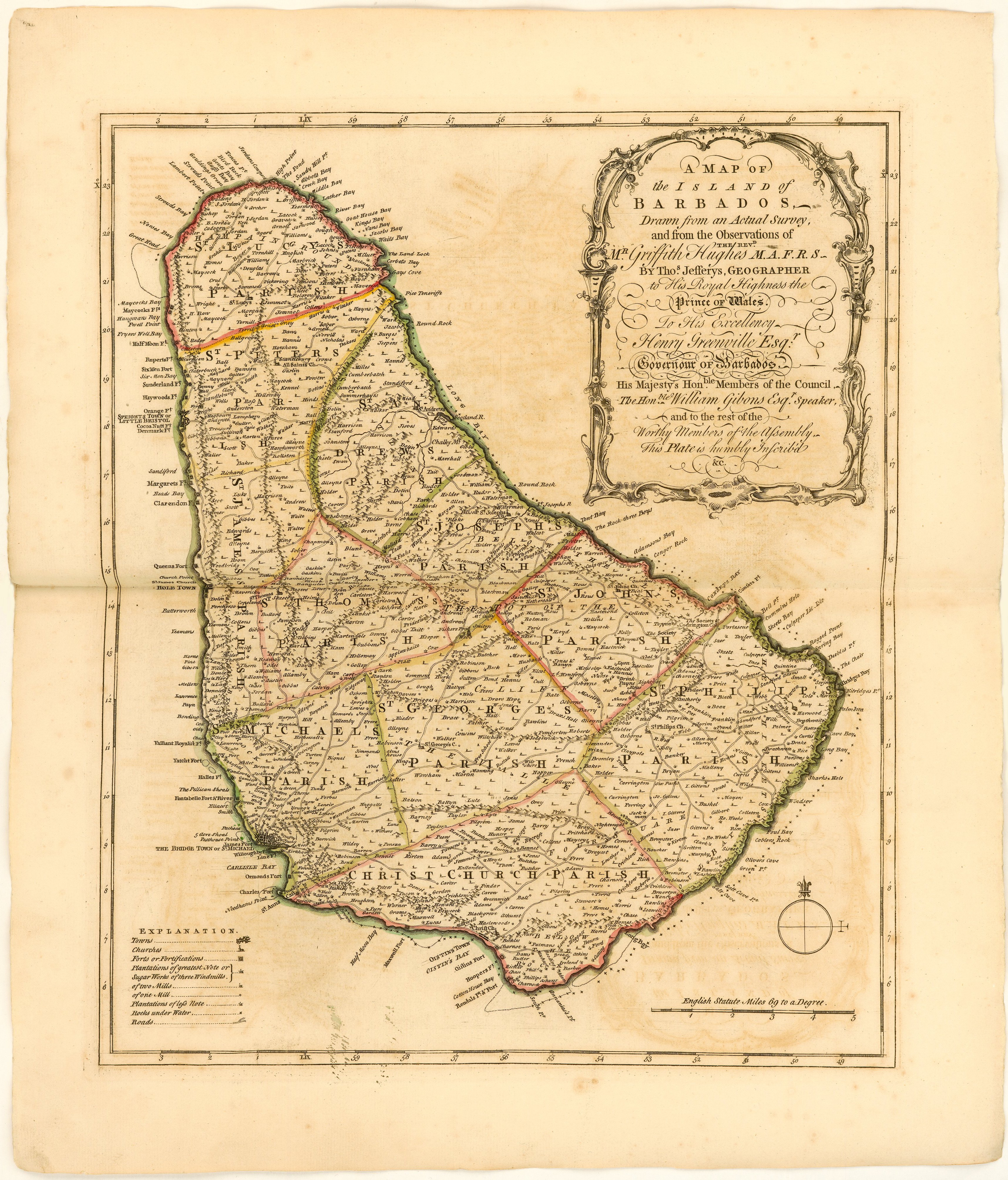
Map of Barbados by geographer Thomas Jefferys in Griffith Hughes' The Natural History of Barbados (London, 1750).

The cartographer for his book was Thomas Jefferys, the map-maker to George III, and his map of Barbados is shown here. The illustrations were created by Georg Dionysius Ehret, who was renowned for his botanical drawings. Hughes was also the first to describe many of the sites around the island from an archaeological perspective. Portions of Hughes' 1750 publication were incorporated into a book on diseases of the West Indies. Grainger and Moseley reference Hughes' work especially as it applies to symptoms and treatment of diseases he observed while in Barbados.

The whereabouts of Mr. Hughes from the late 1750s remains uncertain. One source lists his date of passing as "1778?, location unspecified," while another has him returning to Barbados around 1758, the latter view aligns with the records from the Royal Society.

Hughes' detractors point out that this book did not achieve any scientific breakthroughs, and other works of the Old Colonial Era surpassed it. That being said, the book had a great many patrons, it was widely popular, and was the first publication of scientific research conducted on location in Barbados. Hughes' work was praised by Carl Linnaeus, but it has also been considered a "scientific fraud" although the work is frequently referenced by later work.

== Publications ==
- The Natural History of Barbados, Published in London, 1750.
- Of a Zoophyton resembling the Flower of a Marigold, Philosophical Transactions.
- Works by Hughes at Internet Archive

=== Contributing author ===
- On the treatment and management of the more common West-India diseases (1750–1802)

Other authors: James Grainger, William Wright, and Benjamin Moseley
Edited and Authored by: J. Edward Hutson

This work appears to be edited by Hutson, who incorporated previous work of other authors. It is unclear if the authors worked together, either through correspondence or in person on this work.

== See also ==
- List of abolitionist forerunners
