= Thomas Beach (poet) =

Welsh poet and wine merchant

Thomas Beach (died 1737) was a Welsh poet and wine merchant in Wrexham, Denbighshire.

Besides other poems, he published in 1737 Eugenio, or the Virtuous and Happy Life. It was inscribed to Alexander Pope. Beach had submitted the poem to Jonathan Swift in 1735, partly to receive his criticisms and partly to be recommended to Sir William Fownes, to whom the poem specially referred. Swift's reply suggested many verbal emendations, adopted by the author, but informed him that Fownes had died.

Beach died by suicide on 17 May 1737 by slashing his throat.
