= Matthew Hutton (archbishop of Canterbury) =

British archbishop (1693–1758)

The Most Reverend and Right Honourable Matthew Hutton
- Archbishop of Canterbury
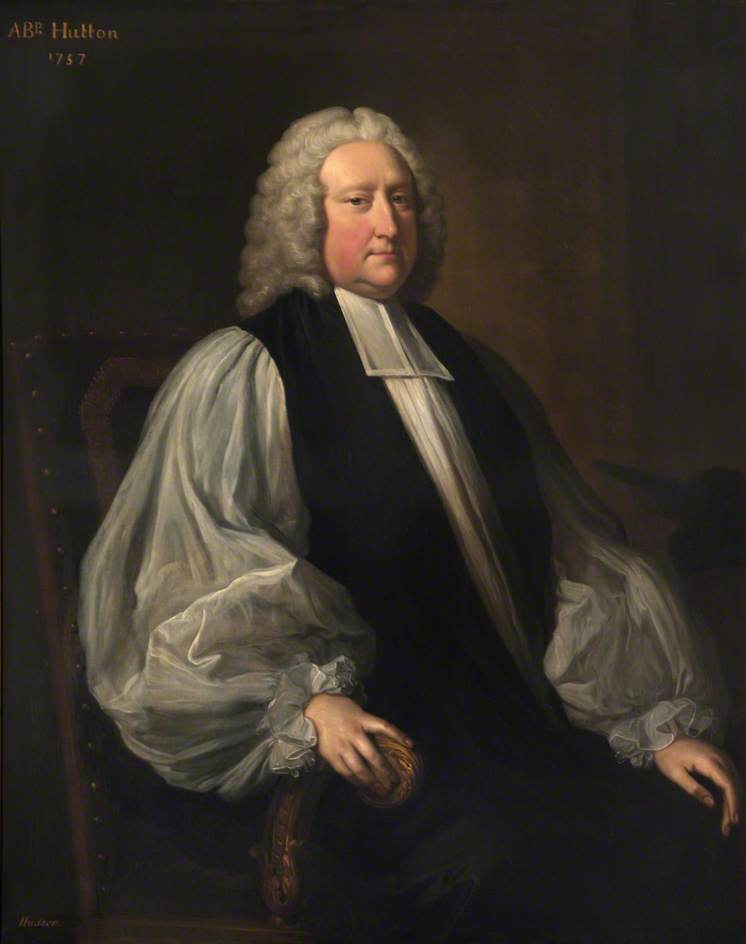
- Portrait by Thomas Hudson
- Church: Church of England
- Installed: 1757
- Term ended: 1758 (death)
- Predecessor: Thomas Herring
- Successor: Thomas Secker
- Other posts: Archbishop of York (1747–1757); Bishop of Bangor (1743–1747)

Personal details
- Born: 3 January 1693 Marske, Yorkshire
- Died: 18 March 1758 (aged 65) Duke Street, Westminster
- Buried: St Mary-at-Lambeth, London
- Denomination: Anglicanism
- Spouse: Mary Lutman (m. 1732)
- Education: Ripon Grammar School; Jesus College, Cambridge

Matthew Hutton (3 January 1693 – 18 March 1758) was a high churchman in the Church of England, serving as Archbishop of York (1747–1757) and Archbishop of Canterbury (1757–1758).

== Early life and education ==
Hutton was born at Marske near Richmond in Yorkshire, the second son of John Hutton of Marske (great-great-grandson of Matthew Hutton, Archbishop of York 1595–1606) and his wife Dorothy, daughter of William Dyke.

He was educated at Ripon Grammar School and Jesus College, Cambridge, matriculating in 1710, graduating B.A. 1714, M.A. 1717. He was a fellow of Christ's College, Cambridge, from 1717 to 1727, and graduated D.D. (comitia regia) in 1728.

At Cambridge he was an exact contemporary of Thomas Herring, whom he succeeded in each of his three bishoprics.

== Ordained ministry ==
Hutton became a royal chaplain to George II in 1736. In 1737 he was appointed Canon of the second stall at St George's Chapel, Windsor Castle, a position he held until 1739. He became Rector of Trowbridge and of Spofforth, in Yorkshire, and held prebends at York and Westminster.

=== Episcopal ministry ===
In 1743 he became Bishop of Bangor, and in 1747, Archbishop of York, before finally, in 1757, becoming Archbishop of Canterbury, but died the next year without having ever lived in Lambeth Palace.

== Suspected discovery of his coffin ==
In 2016, during the refurbishment of the Garden Museum, which is housed at the medieval church of St Mary-at-Lambeth, 30 lead coffins were found; one with an archbishop's red and gold mitre on top of it. Two archbishops were identified from nameplates on their coffins; with church records revealing that a further three archbishops, including Hutton, were likely to be buried in the vault.

Church of England titles
Preceded by Thomas Herring	Bishop of Bangor; 1743–1747	Succeeded by Zachary Pearce
Preceded by Thomas Herring	Archbishop of York; 1747–1757	Succeeded by John Gilbert
Preceded by Thomas Herring	Archbishop of Canterbury; 1757–1758	Succeeded by Thomas Secker
