= William Bulkeley (diarist) =

Welsh landowner and diarist

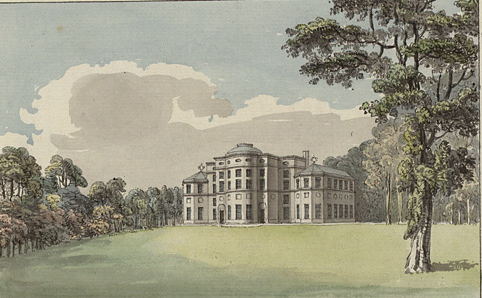

William Bulkeley (4 November 1691 – 28 October 1760) was a minor Welsh landowner, remembered chiefly as a diarist. He was born in Brynddu in the parish of Llanfechell, Anglesey, the son of William Bulkeley of Brynddu and of Lettice, daughter of Captain Henry Jones of Llangoed. He was sheriff of Anglesey in 1715.

For many years he kept a meticulous diary. It was celebrated in 2014 with a dramatic performance at Brynddu house, still owned by one of his descendants.

Two volumes survive: the first from 30 March 1734 to 8 June 1743, and the second from 1 August 1747 to 28 September 1760. Every day he recorded his impression of the weather, but he also gives many details of estate management, local politics and religious upheaval, his patronage of harpists, cattle-dealing in the local fairs, his legal duties as justice of the peace, and his visit to Dublin. He seldom alludes to his business dealings, but in 1736 he refers to a debt and to money paid in London: "being entirely abandoned by all my pretended friends, (good Mr. L. of Llysdulas in particular) in my utmost necessity to assist me to find out money to pay a great Debt I run into by his persuasion & tho I writt to him (being now in Ireland) never vouchsafed an Answer, I went to day to Cwtt y Dwndwr, haveing had Morris Lewis's Letter that I might have 800L. pd in London, but wanted to know what Security I would give & when I would have the money pd. I had before writt to my Son to come down to the Sessions to Joyn with me in a Recovery to secure the 800L. which I acquainted him with & was satisfyed–"

30th. The Wind S. clear & very hot weather, Mr. Hughes Plâs Coch came here, & pd. me the 270L. I had pd. for him in London. part of the money he paid for Glan‘rafon & wrâch ddu.

== Family troubles ==
He also refers to the marital troubles of his daughter Mary, who in 1738 married Fortunatus Wright, merchant and privateer of Liverpool.

17th. The Wind S W. dark & cloudy, made some little rain in the Morning, rained very hard afterwards about Noon; & after 3 hours respite rained hard again about 4. fair & clear afterwards: To day came here Mr. Fortunatus Wright a Brewer & Distiller in Liverpool, ~~& possessed of an Estate of 120L.a year~~ (accompanyed by Dr. Evans of Llanerchymedd, with Letters – of recomendation from Mr. Wm. Parry of Dublin, March 17th.[...from my Daughter Mary Bulkeley whose suitor he had been the ... [consent to have him for her husband, & tho I thought him not equall to her...

"21st. The Wind S.W. raining all the morning with very little intermission from 1 a clock to 9. the rest of the day very hazy & the wind high, at the fall of night it rained again severall very heavy showers, & a — mizling rain (I believe) most part of the night. pd to a Messenger that brought me a letter from H.head from my Daughter giveing an acct. of the Villain's impudence that brought on her misfortunes 2s. therein requesting - either my speedy consent to her being marryed to Wright forthwith, whereby she may prevent all further trouble, or to send for her home. pd. 4d for mending a pair of shooes to be given old Owen John Thomas.

22d. The Wind S.W. dark & cloudy, tho blowing fresh, & raw cold weather, & a dripping mizling rain all day long - so that my people are not able neither to plow, nor harrow this Day my Daughter was Marryed to Mr. Fortunatus Wright. being the same day of the Month that I was marryed to her Mother: tho She knew nothing of it".

Mary's troubles did not end with Fortunatus' death in 1756: "Paid 2s. 8d. for Postage with a double Letter I sent to my Daughter at Leghorn in answer to 4 received from her one on the back of another complaining of the unheard of cruelty & persecution she undergoes there ever since the Death of her husband by one Evelin who had Married Phillipa Wright his Daughter by a former wife, who by his great influence in yt fact & Interest with the Consul, claiming all Wright's effects as pretending to be due him onely by the laws of that Countrey had the Consul's leave to seize on all she had, & that she is now destitute of every thing, lodging with the Woman who had come over from liverpool along with her"
