= Charles Cecil (bishop) =

Anglican Bishop

- Bishop of Bangor
- Church: Church of England
- Province: Canterbury
- Diocese: Bangor
- Appointed: 1734
- Term ended: 1737
- Predecessor: Thomas Sherlock
- Successor: Thomas Herring

Personal details
- Born: c.1695
- Died: 29 May 1737 Llandudno, Caernarfonshire, Great Britain
- Denomination: Christianity (Anglican)
- Education: Cambridge University

Charles Cecil (c.1695 – 29 May 1737) was the Bishop of Bristol before being translated as the Bishop of Bangor in 1734 until his death in 1737.

Cecil was the only surviving son of Robert Cecil (an MP, son of James Cecil, 3rd Earl of Salisbury and Margaret née Manners). Cecil's sister, Margaret, married Robert Brown, who was created a baronet.

== See also ==
- Bangor Cathedral

Cecil's paternal arms

Church of England titles
Preceded by Thomas Sherlock	Bishop of Bangor; 1734-37	Succeeded by Thomas Herring
