= John Harris (bishop) =

British bishop, born 1680

John Harris (1680 – 28 August 1738) was Bishop of Llandaff from 1729 to 1738, as well as serving as Dean of Hereford Cathedral and of Wells Cathedral.

== Life ==
The son of George Harris of Milford Haven, Pembrokeshire, Wales, he was educated at Jesus College, Oxford, matriculating in 1697 and obtaining his Bachelor of Arts degree in 1701. After being ordained, he became rector of Rudbaxton in Pembrokeshire, later becoming rector of Lampeter Velfrey (1708–1729). He was appointed a Fellow of Oriel College, Oxford in 1728, the year in which he received the degree of Doctor of Divinity from the University of Cambridge, and became a canon of Canterbury Cathedral. He became vicar of Ticehurst, Surrey in 1729, before becoming Bishop of Llandaff later in the year. During his time as bishop, he was active in the restoration of the cathedral. He was also Dean of Hereford Cathedral from 1729 to 1736, then became Dean of Wells Cathedral, where he was buried after his death on 28 August 1738.

Church of England titles
Preceded by Robert Clavering	Bishop of Llandaff; 1728–1738	Succeeded by Matthias Mawson
