= Thomas Herring =

Archbishop of Canterbury from 1747 to 1757

The Most Reverend and Right Honourable Thomas Herring
- Archbishop of Canterbury
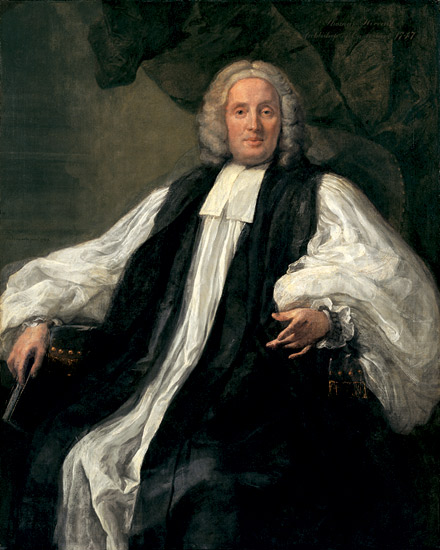
- Portrait by William Hogarth
- Church: Church of England
- Diocese: Canterbury
- In office: 1747–1757
- Predecessor: John Potter
- Successor: Matthew Hutton
- Previous posts: Bishop of Bangor (1737–1743); Archbishop of York (1743–1747)

Orders
- Consecration: 15 January 1738 by John Potter

Personal details
- Born: baptised 10 October 1693 Walsoken, Norfolk, England
- Died: 23 March 1757 (aged 63-64) Croydon, London, England
- Denomination: Anglican
- Education: Wisbech Grammar School; Jesus College, Cambridge
- Signature: Thomas Herring's signature

Thomas Herring (baptised 10 October 1693 – 23 March 1757) was Archbishop of Canterbury from 1747 to 1757.

== Early life and education ==
He was the son of John Herring, rector of Walsoken in Norfolk, who had previously been vicar of Foxton, near Cambridge, and his wife, Martha Potts.

He was educated at Wisbech Grammar School and Jesus College, Cambridge, matriculating in 1710, graduating B.A. 1714, M.A. 1717. Having migrated to Corpus Christi College, Cambridge, in 1714, he was a fellow of Corpus Christi from 1716 to 1723, and graduated D.D. (comitia regia) in 1728.

At Cambridge, he was an exact contemporary of Matthew Hutton, who succeeded him in turn in each of his dioceses.

== Career ==
Herring became a close friend of Philip Yorke, the Solicitor General, who would later, as Lord Hardwicke, serve for many years as Lord Chancellor, and as such, was able to advance quickly. In 1727 he became a chaplain to King George II, in 1732 Dean of Rochester, and in 1737 he was appointed Bishop of Bangor, consecrated 15 January 1738.

=== Archbishop of York ===
On 21 April 1743 he was translated to York and appointed Archbishop of York. On 23 September 1745, during the Jacobite rising, Herring gave a rousing sermon which, as Paul Langford notes, "captured the patriotic imagination as nothing previously had. It was to remain long in the collective mind of patriotic Protestantism". At a speech at York Castle on 24 September, Herring said:

...these Commotions in the North are but Part of a Great Plan concerted for our Ruin—They have begun under the Countenance, and will be supported by the Forces of France and Spain, our old and inveterate, (and late Experience calls upon me to add, our savage and blood-thirsty) Enemies—A Circumstance that should fire the Indignation of every honest Englishman. If these Designs should succeed, and Popery and Arbitrary Power come in upon us, under the Influence and Direction of these two Tyrannical and Corrupted Courts, I leave you to reflect, what would become of every Thing that is valuable to us! We are now bless'd with the mild Administration of a Just and Protestant King, who is of so strict an Adherence to the Laws of our Country, that not an Instance can be pointed out, during his whole reign, wherein he made the least Attempt upon the Liberty, or Property, or Religion, of a single Person. But if the Ambition and Pride of France and Spain, is to dictate to us, we must submit to a Man to govern us under their hated and accursed Influence, who brings his Religion from Rome, and Rules and Maxims of his Government from Paris and Madrid.

Horace Walpole said this speech "had as much true spirit, honesty and bravery in it as ever was penned by an historian for an ancient hero". When Lord Hardwicke, the Lord Chancellor, repeated the speech's contents to King George II, the King ordered that the speech be printed in the Gazette. After Hardwicke enquired whether he should send Herring a message containing the King's admiration of "his zeal and activity", the King said this was not enough: "...you must also tell the Archbishop that I heartily thank him for it."

Herring organised Yorkshire into resistance against the Jacobites by raising volunteers and money. According to Reed Browning, Herring's behaviour during the rebellion had demonstrated that he was "a resolute Whig, a brave Briton, and a commanding prelate". Herring supported the Walpoleon Whigs because he viewed the Protestant Succession embodied in the House of Hanover as essential to Britain: "Let us remember that, next under God, Union at Home, and Loyalty and Affection to the King and his Royal Family, are our great and sure Defence." He was also deeply suspicious of France as a Roman Catholic nation and a threat to the British nation.

=== Archbishopric of Canterbury ===
On 21 Oct 1747, he was nominated as Archbishop of Canterbury. There he generally followed the lead of his friend the Lord Chancellor, and frequently came into disputes with the Duke of Newcastle, the Secretary of State. Herring, like his immediate predecessor, had taken a generally Hanoverian side through the Bangorian controversy and stood against the convocation.

Herring is generally credited as being the author of "A New Form of Common Prayer", published anonymously in 1753 in response to John Jones's Free and Candid Disquisitions (1749). However, as a conciliator he eschewed controversy and rejoiced that he was "called up to this high station, at a time, when spite, and rancour, and bitterness of spirit are out of countenance; when we breathe the benign and comfortable air of liberty and toleration". He wrote a note of encouragement to the philosopher David Hume, at a time when the latter's publications were failing to attract a readership.

He died in 1757 and was buried in Croydon Minster, which was then in Surrey.

== Arms ==
Coat of arms of Thomas Herring

Notes
While Herring was serving as a bishop his arms would have been displayed impaled with the arms of the diocese and topped with a mitre.
Escutcheon
Azure semee of crosslets three herrings haurient two and one Argent.

== Notes ==
Church of England titles
Preceded by Charles Cecil	Bishop of Bangor; 1737–1743	Succeeded by Matthew Hutton
Preceded by Lancelot Blackburne	Archbishop of York; 1743–1747	Succeeded by Matthew Hutton
Preceded by John Potter	Archbishop of Canterbury; 1747–1757	Succeeded by Matthew Hutton
