= Isaac Maddox =

British bishop (1697–1759)

Isaac Maddox (27 July 1697 – 27 September 1759) was an Anglican clergyman, successively bishop of St Asaph and of Worcester.

== Life ==
Isaac was the son of a Dissenter, Edward Maddox, stationer of London. He was orphaned at an early age, and brought up by an aunt who sent him to a charity school before apprenticing him to a pastry cook. However, assisted by an uncle, he resigned his apprenticeship and was tutored by Rev Hay, vicar of St Stephen Coleman Street. As a practising Dissenter, Maddox was given a grant from the Presbyterian Fund to study for the Dissenting ministry at the University of Edinburgh. Here he befriended John Horsley, who later became the father of Samuel Horsley, who at that time was also destined for the Dissenting ministry. He was awarded MA in January 1722/3.

Maddox returned to London early in 1723 and, along with John Horsley, promptly conformed to the Church of England, though he remained on friendly terms with Dissenters, notably Philip Doddridge of Northampton; and he conspicuously supported foreign Moravian Christians in the North American colonies. In 1740, foreign Protestants after a residence of seven years could become naturalized on swearing an oath of allegiance. Quakers were exempted this oath. In 1747, with Maddox's support, the exemption was extended to Moravians. In his speech in the House of Lords, Maddox insisted that

It would be beneficial "if the British nation expresses itself in favour of the [United] Brethren; for whatever benefit England confers upon this ancient confessor Church must be an encouragement to all evangelical Christians throughout the world, to expect nothing but good from this country."

On 10 March 1722/3, following his return to London from Edinburgh, Maddox was conferred Deacon by Thomas Green, bishop of Norwich, and given a curacy at St Bride's Church, Fleet Street. Soon after, on 9 June, he was ordained priest by bishop Edmund Gibson who sent him to Queens' College, Cambridge, who awarded him BA the following year. In 1724 he was given the vicarship of Whiteparish, Wiltshire, and in 1729 the rectorate of St Vedast Foster Lane, London. In the same year, he was also appointed domestic chaplain to Edward Waddington, bishop of Chichester, who gave him a prebendary at Chichester. He was awarded DD (Queens' College, Cambridge) by Royal Mandate in 1730.

The following year, 1731, Maddox married Elizabeth Price, niece of Bishop Waddington, by whom he had a son, Isaac Price Maddox, and two daughters, one of whom, Mary, married James Yorke, later Bishop of Ely.

In late 1733 he was appointed Dean of Wells.

In 1736 Maddox was elevated to the bishopric of St Asaph, though he continued to live in London, and at Westhorpe House, his country house at Little Marlow in Buckinghamshire. He only visited his diocese on occasional summers. In 1743 he was translated bishop of Worcester. He was a founder member of the Society for the Encouragement of Arts, Manufactures and Commerce in 1754. Isaac Maddox is buried in the south transept of Worcester Cathedral.

== Charitable works ==
Maddox supported numerous charities. In addition, he was president of the Small-pox Hospital in London, and a principle promoter of Worcester Infirmary, consulting Philip Doddridge who had taken a similar part in founding the County Infirmary at Northampton. He also promoted British industry, sinking much money into supporting British fisheries. The breadth of his interest in charitable works is represented in the many charity sermons that were published.

== Published works ==
Apart from numerous charity sermons, and pleas for action against alcohol abuse, Maddox's principal publication is his Vindication of the government, doctrine, and worship, of the Church of England, 1733, in which he ably defends the anti-Puritan position, criticising Daniel Neal's History of the Puritans.

His charity sermons include:

- 1733; A sermon [for] the Incorporated Society for the Propagation of the Gospel in Foreign Parts.
- 1737; The love of our country recommended: [for] the Societies for Reformation of Manners.
- 1739; A sermon [for] the Publick Infirmary in James-Street, Westminster.
- 1740; A sermon...for promoting English Protestant Working-Schools in Ireland.
- 1741; A sermon [for] charity-schools, in and about the cities of London and Westminster.
- 1742; A sermon preached [for] the Sons of the Clergy.
- 1743; The duty and advantages of encouraging public infirmaries [for] the London Infirmary, in Goodman's-Fields, for the relief of sick and diseased manufacturers, and seamen in merchant-service, &c.
- 1748; The necessity of perseverance in well-doing; a sermon [for] the Worcester Infirmary.
- 1750; The expediency of preventive wisdom [for] the several hospitals of the city of London.
- 1752; A sermon preached [for] the Hospital for the Small-pox, and for Inoculation.
- 1753; The wisdom and duty of preserving destitute infants.

Church of England titles
Preceded by Matthew Brailsford	Dean of Wells; 1733–1736	Succeeded by John Harris
Preceded by Thomas Tanner	Bishop of St Asaph; 1736–1743	Succeeded by John Thomas
Preceded by John Hough	Bishop of Worcester; 1743–1759	Succeeded by James Johnson
