= Howell Harris =

Welsh preacher (1714–1773)

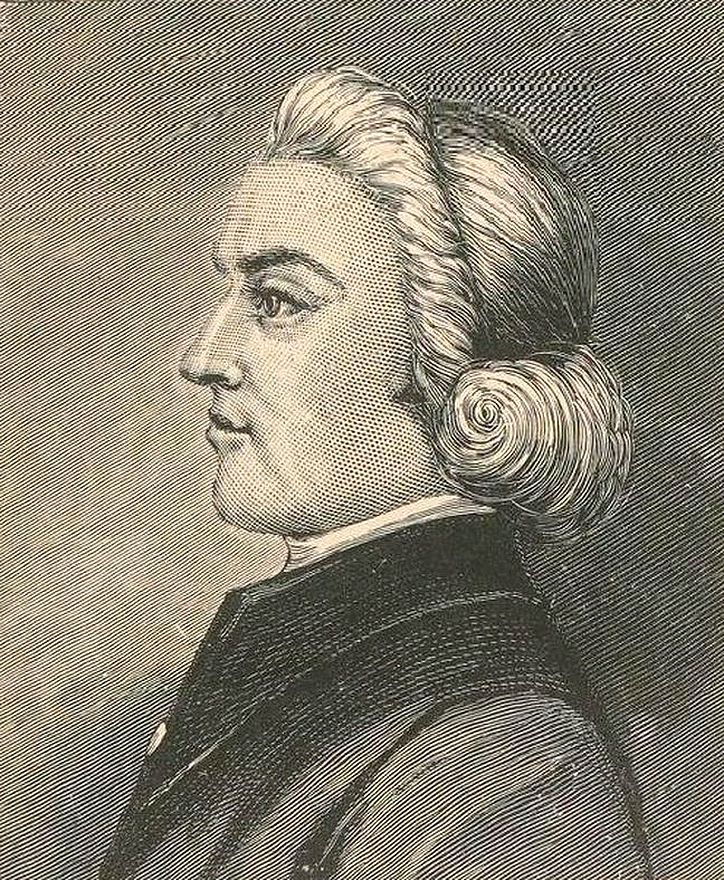
- Born: 23 January 1714; Talgarth, Brecknockshire, Wales
- Died: 21 July 1773 (aged 59)
- Resting place: Talgarth
- Occupation: Preacher
- Known for: Founder of the Calvinistic Methodist Church

Howell Harris (Welsh: Howel Harris; 23 January 1714 – 21 July 1773) was a Calvinistic Methodist evangelist. He was one of the main leaders of the Welsh Methodist revival during The First Great Awakening in the 18th century, along with Daniel Rowland, William Williams Pantycelyn, and George Whitefield. Before he was ordained a minister he was not allowed to preach at a church and had to resort to preaching outdoors, becoming the first Methodist open-air preacher. He was with William Steward on a preaching tour in England when Seward was martyred by an angry mob, incited by members of the Anglican clergy. He was a close associate of prominent preachers in the Methodist revival movement, including John Wesley and George Whitefield. Harris accepted a commission to serve as an officer and a preacher in the British militia during the Seven Years' War.

== Early life and family ==
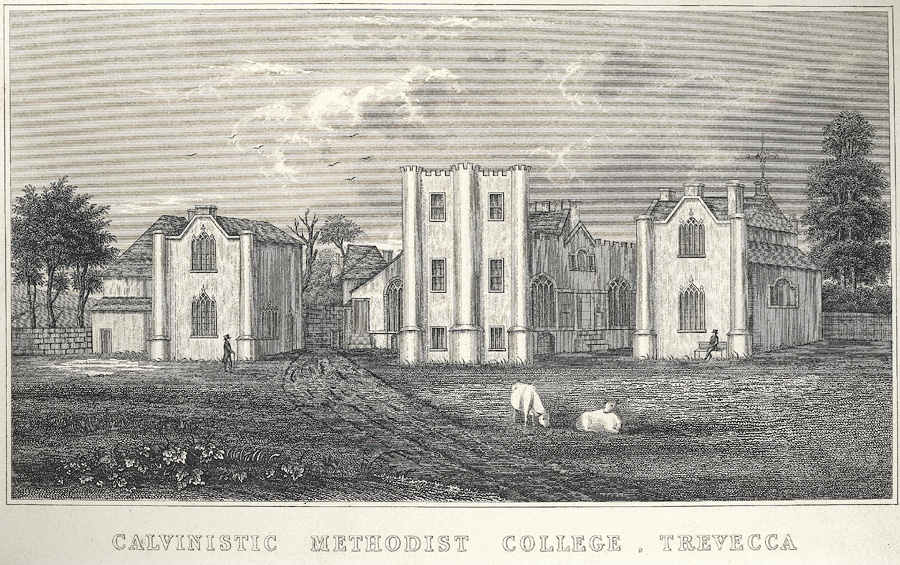
Teulu Trefeca (the building is depicted here in 1860 when in use as a Calvinistic Methodist College)

Harris was born at Trevecka, near Talgarth in Brecknockshire on 23 January 1714. He was the youngest of five children of Howell Powel, alias Harris (c. 1672–1731), a carpenter, and his wife, Susannah (died 1751), daughter of Thomas Powell. their youngest son, Howel, was born 23 January 1714 and was educated at Llwyn-llwyd. From 1732 to 1735 Harris was a schoolmaster at Llan-gors and Llangasty. The family originally hailed from Carmarthenshire, but had settled in Trefeca in 1700, where Howell Sr had purchased a small landholding. Harris's oldest brother Joseph trained as a blacksmith, but went on to secure a post at the Royal Mint after studying in London. His other brother Thomas made his name as a tailor to wealthy clients and amassed enough income to purchase estates in Tregunter and Trefeca, and other properties nearby. He served as High Sheriff of Brecknockshire in 1768. Howell as a youth had no inclination to any sort of career that would have him in the public eye:

"My parents kept me in school until I was 18 years old, and I made considerable progress in my studies : but as it was then that my father died, I was discouraged from entertaining any thoughts of appearing in the world as a public character, and therefore I undertook the employment of instructing youth, and opened a common school in the country." — Howell

Harris was married on May 18, 1744 to Anne, daughter of John Williams, esq, who himself was a dissenter. On the day of his wedding he wrote and entered a prayer in his diary, equating his holy union with his wife with the holy union of Jesus and the church. Anne often participated in Howell's missionary efforts, and traveled with his at times. Their marriage was subjected to a scandalous lie, fabricated by various individuals opposed to the revivalist movement, but to no avail, as the couple remained married for life.

== Conversion and ministry ==
Harris underwent religious conversion in March 1735 after hearing a parish-church sermon by the Rev. Pryce Davies on Palm Sunday, (the Sunday before Easter), on the necessity of partaking of Holy Communion. He was especially struck by the Reverend's solemn words, "If you are not fit to come to the Lord's Table, you are not: fit to come to church, you are not fit to live, you are not fit to die." This led to several weeks of self-examination, which reached a climax at Communion on Whit Sunday, May 1735. After what is described as answering the devil's accusations, he received Communion and became convinced he had received mercy through the blood of Christ, which gave him a sense of great joy. He immediately began to tell others of this and hold meetings in his home to encourage others to seek the same assurance of Christ's forgiveness.

Harris went to Oxford to study for the Anglican Church in 1735, but took great exception at the abuse of authority, infidelity and immorality that prevailed there, all of which drove him away. Returning to Wales he began to bring attention to the neglected poor in their cottages, and was so successful that in a few months he formed several charitable societies for their relief. Subsequently he failed to be accepted for ordination in the Church of England because of views held to be "Methodist". Instead he became a travelling preacher, tirelessly determined to spread the word through Wales. His preaching often led him into personal danger, persecution and hardship before he gained a following. From 1738 he was supported by Marmaduke Gwynne, a local squire and early convert.

In 1738, the first Methodist Society was formed in the town chapel, a modestly designed structure in Neville's-court, Fetter-lane, London. Harris, along with John Wesley, George Whitefield, Benjamin Ingham and many other eminent men preached there with "amazing power and success". Harris biographer, Griffith Roberts, maintains that the success of the movement is largely attributed to Harris, who rarely prepared his sermons in advance.

Before Harris began his tour of ministry in Wales he reflected on his own life before his conversion, and noted that much of Welsh society was devoid of any religious influence, as he once was.

All family worship being utterly laid aside ... while an universal deluge At that time there was at that time [in Wales] a general slumber over the land; no one had the true knowledge of God;" a universal deluge of swearing, lying, reveling, drunkenness, fighting, and gaming, had overspread the country like a mighty torrent. — Harris.

In March, 1739, Harris met George Whitefield for the first time when Whitefield and his traveling companion, William Seward, visited South Wales Church pulpits were denied him, but through the influence of Seward he was permitted to preach in the town hall in Cardiff. Whitefield had heard of Howell's public stance against the Anglican Church over what he felt were abuse of the clergy. To this effect, before meeting Harris, Whitefield wrote Harris a greeting, London, Dec. 1738:

My dear brother, Though I am unknown to you in person, yet I have long been united to you in spirit; and have been rejoiced to hear how the good pleasure of the Lord prospered in your hand . . . I love you, and wish you may be the spiritual father of thousands, and shine as the sun in the kingdom of your heavenly Father, Oh how I shall joy to meet you—at the judgment seat ! How you would honour me, if you would send a line to your affectionate though unworthy brother. — G. Whitefield.

On June 19, John Wesley arrived in Bristol on a preaching assignment. Harris, who had not formally met Wesley at that point, was among the gathering before Wesley. He called upon Wesley a couple of hours after his sermon with news that he had been much dissuaded from either hearing or seeing Wesley preach shortly before his sermon. Harris, however, was happy to inform Wesley of his encounter with words of adulation:

"...but soon as I heard you preach, I quickly found what spirit you was of. And before you had done, I was so overpowered with joy and love, that I had much ado to walk home.” — Harris.

At Cowbridge, in 1740, Harris met with William Seward, with whom he traveled and preached in various Welsh towns. He was accompanying Seward while he was preaching a sermon at Newport. They were attacked by an incited angry mob, who tore at their clothing and pelted them with stones and other handy objects. Seward received a severe blow on the right eye which destroyed its sight.for a time. At Hay-on-Wye in October they were again attacked by an angry mob, where Seward was struck in the back of the head with a large stone, causing his death a couple of days later, where Seward became the first Methodist martyr.

Harris accompanied Whitefield on his second preaching tour in Wales in April, 1743. Together they preached, alternately, in the open-air at Pontypool, Abergaveny, Comiboy, Carlion, Trelix, and Newport, to thousands of people in attendance. Whitefield spoke first in English, followed by Harris preaching in Welsh. During one of Harris' preaching session at Carlion, a drummer-boy was instructed to stand along side him and beat on his drum, effectively drowning out the words of his sermon in the hopes that Harris would cease and desist.

In 1750 Harris retreated to his home at Trefeca, having burnt out and fallen out with a fellow evangelist, Daniel Rowland, and become the subject of public scandal for his close friendship with "Madam" Sidney Griffith. In 1752 he was inspired by the example of the Moravians to found a religious community there known as Teulu Trefeca (The Trefeca family) with himself as "Father".

=== Militia service ===
During the Seven years War Harris accepted a commission as captain in the Breconshire Militia, serving in the last three years of the war. Fear of invasion from France and the potential loss of liberties, including religious liberty, was evident everywhere. Harris was especially concerned about the threat to religious liberty. Though the idea of war was in contrast to his pastoral capacity, when he was offered a commission, he was thus willing to accept, but on the condition that he be allowed to preach when circumstances permitted it. Seeing the propriety of such an effort, his superiors granted Harris the liberty to preach while on permanent duty, while having the consent of his friends and colleagues to accept the commission.

The militia's first assignment brought them to the seaport town of Yarmouth, in the spring of 1760. Upon his arrival Harris inquired about whether any Methodists were living in the town. He was informed that an other Methodist preacher had made an attempt to preach there, but narrowly escaped violent injury or death from an angry mob. Not discouraged, Harris employed the town-crier to give notice that he would soon be giving a sermon at the market-place. At the time appointed a large mob emerged on the scene, armed with stones, clubs and other objects. Mounting a stand prepared for him by his men, Harris relentlessly commenced to singing hymns and offering prayers, while his men, armed with muskets, slung over their shoulders, standing firmly with folded arms, surrounded him. Harris preached with little interruption, while the temperament of many of the listeners was softened, and prejudices and hostilities began to disappear.

From that point on Harris promptly continued preaching to crowded congregations every evening. The following winter the Militia returned to Wales, and set up headquarters at Brecon, at which time Harris used the opportunity to continue his preaching, allowing hims to spend some time visiting friends at Trevecka. In the summer of 1761, they took their route to the West of England. They continued some time at Bideford, and at Great Torrington, where he greeted with a friendly reception, and had many hearers. In the following summer, Harris had an opportunity of visiting several large towns in the West of England, including Barnstaple, and Plymouth, where he continued to preach with his usual dynamic enthusiasm. In 1763, after serving three years in the Militia, a treaty of peace was reached; Harris and his company were relieved and he returned to Trevecka.

== Final years ==
After the Seven Years' War ended in 1763, Harris returned from his service in the war to his religious commune at Trevecka, where he spent his final decade preaching. He reconciled with Rowland and others with fellow revivalists over past issues, while expanding his Christian community, and collaborating with the Countess of Huntingdon to found a training college for the Methodist ministry. Harris died on January 23, 1773, at the age of 59, and was buried close to his birthplace at Talgarth, where some 20,000 people are said to have attended his funeral. There is a memorial to him at Rhydyclafdy, near Pwllheli, where he preached.

== Howell Harris papers ==
Harris kept a detailed diary, which amounted to many volumes, and carefully filed the letters he sent and received during his ministry. His papers offer a first-hand account of the Welsh Methodist revival. After his death, they were left to gather dust for over a century before O. M. Edwards, in the 1880s, noted their importance and suggested they ought to be cared for. By this time, the former home of Harris at Trefeca had been turned into a college, whose deputy head, Edwin Williams, took on the task of putting the papers in order. They were kept there until 1910, when the Presbyterian Church of Wales, as their ostensible owner, decided to set up a committee to take care of them and study them. By 1913 the scale of the work needing to be done on the papers became apparent. Many of the papers were in Latin, and it was estimated that it would take much of a decade and a vast sum of money to ready them for publication. In 1913, it was decided it would be a better use of resources to set up a Historical Society of the Presbyterian Church of Wales, which would publish a regular journal that would include some of Harris's papers. Probably around 1932, the papers were moved from Trefeca to the denomination's theological college in Aberystwyth. These papers, along with others from Coleg y Bala (an old college of the denomination in Bala, North Wales, not to be confused with Bala-Bangor Theological Seminary), were taken in 1934 to be stored safely at the National Library of Wales. There the papers remain in the vaults to this day. Revd Dr Geraint Tudur (son of R. Tudur Jones), formerly Lecturer in Church History at University of Wales, Bangor, and subsequently General Secretary of the Union of Welsh Independents, published a biography: Howell Harris: From Conversion to Separation, 1735–1750 (Cardiff: University of Wales Press, 2000).

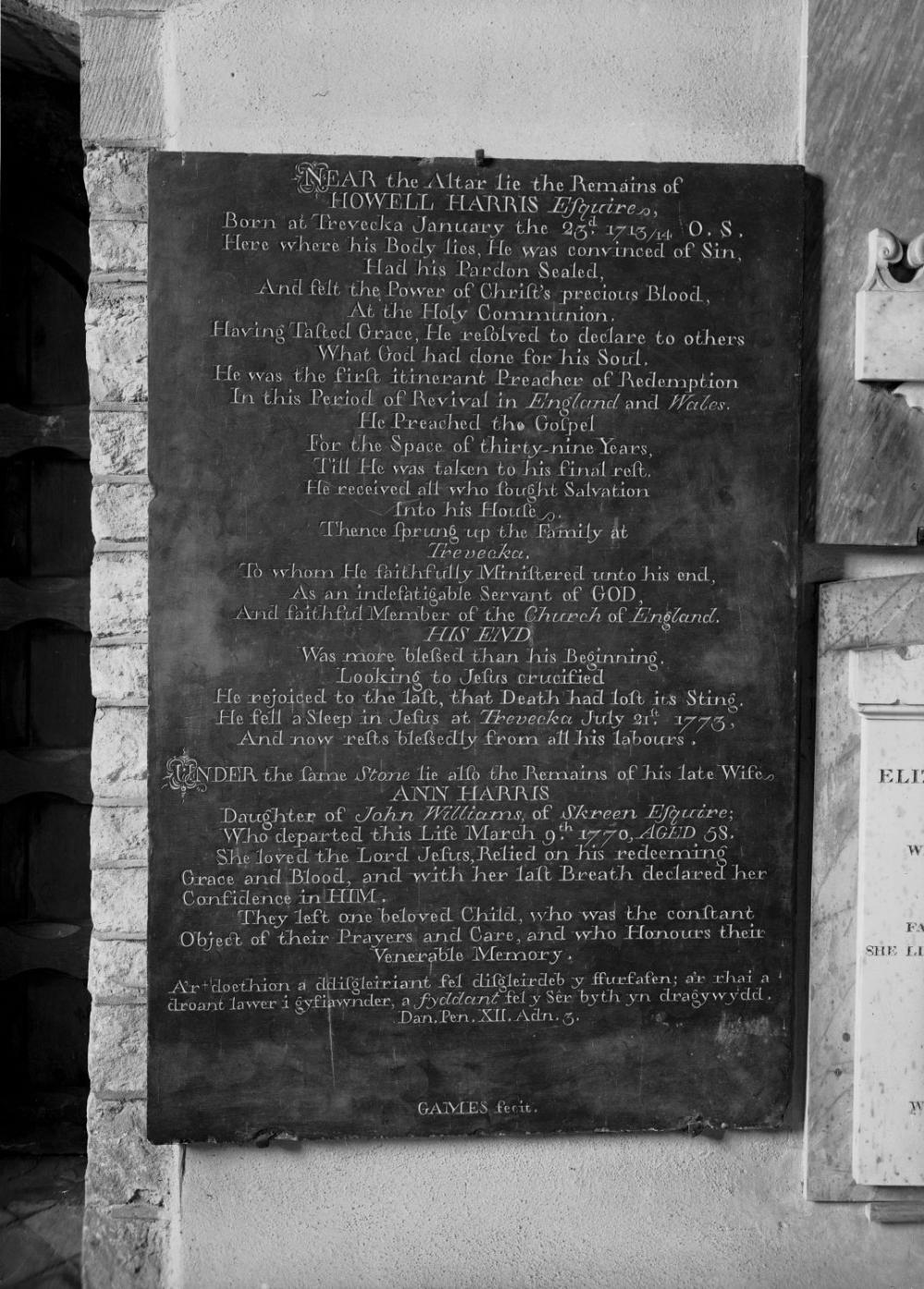
Memorial; Trefeca.

== Legacy ==
Howell Harris left a legacy as the premiere pioneer of open-air preaching, co-founder of Welsh Calvinistic Methodism, and builder of lasting religious and social networks. Alongside Daniel Rowland, he ignited the 18th-century Welsh Methodist Revival. Because of his central role in the Welsh Methodist movement the name of Howell Harris was "as dear to evangelical Welshmen as that of Griffith Jones". Martyn Lloyd-Jones called him “one of the great heroic figures of the Christian church. He left behind some 300 diaries and nearly 3,000 items of correspondence, together with miscellaneous papers, known as the "Trevecka Manuscripts."

== See also ==
- Divergence between Anglicanism and Methodism
- Religion in Wales
- 1904–1905 Welsh revival

== Bibliography ==
- Barr, Josiah Henry (1916). Early Methodists under persecution. New York: Methodist book concern.
- Bennett, Richard (1987). Howell Harris and the Dawn of Revival. Wales: Evangelical Press of Wales.
- Billingsley, Amos Stevens (1878). The life of the great preacher, Reverend George Whitefield, "The prince of pulpit orators". Philadelphia: P. W. Ziegler & Co.
- Bulmer, John (1824). Memoirs of the Life and Religious Labours of Howell Harris, Esq (PDF). London: J.Thomas.
- Dallimore, Arnold A. (1980). George Whitefield: The Life and Times of the Great Evangelist of the Eighteenth-Century Revival. Vol. II. Edinburgh or Carlisle: Banner of Truth Trust. ISBN 978-0-85151-300-3.
- Evans, Richard W. (June 1961). "The Relations of George Whitefield and Howell Harris, Fathers of Calvinistic Methodism". Church History. 30 (2): 179–190. doi:10.2307/3161971. JSTOR 3161971.
- Harris, Howell (1791). A Brief Account of the Life of Howell Harris. Trevecka.
- Hedges, Brian (20 May 2025). "The Life And Ministry Of Howell Harris". The Christian Heritage Center.
- Hughes, Hugh Joshua (2017) [1st pub. 1892]. Life of Howell Harris: The Welsh Reformer. William Jones. ISBN 9781375570541.
- Henry, Stuart C. (1957). George Whitefield: wayfaring witness. New York: Abingdon Press.
- Lloyd-Jones, D. Martyn (1987). "Howell Harris and Revival," in The Puritans: Their Origins and Successors. Edinburgh: The Banner of Truth Trust.
- Morgan, Edward (1852). The life and times of Howel Harris, Esq., the first itinerant preacher in Wales. London: Holywell.
- Nuttall, Geoffrey (1965). Howell Harris 1714–1773: The Last Enthusiast. Cardiff: University of Wales Press.
- Philip, Robert (1838). The life and times of the Reverend George Whitefield. London: George Virtue.
- Roberts, Griffith T. (1951). Howell Harris. London: Epworth Press.
- Roberts, Reverend Gomer Morgan (1959). "HARRIS, HOWELL (1714-1773), religious reformer". Dictionary of Welsh Biography.
- Thomas, Graham C. G. (1990). "George Whitefield and friends : the correspondence of some early Methodists". National Library of Wales Journal. 26 (3): 263. Archived from the original on 12 August 2014.
- Tyerman, Luke (1876). The life of George Whitefield. Vol. I. London: Hodder and Stoughton, Publishers.
- Wesley, John (1832). The works of the Reverend John Wesley. Vol. III. New York: B. Waugh and T. Mason.
- Wesley, John (1832). The works of the Reverend John Wesley. Vol. IV. New York: B. Waugh and T. Mason.
- Morgan, Derec Llwyd. "Harris, Howel". Oxford Dictionary of National Biography (online ed.). Oxford University Press. doi:10.1093/ref:odnb/12392. (Subscription, Wikipedia Library access or UK public library membership required.)

Further reading

- Stevens, Abel (1859). The history of the religious movement of the eighteenth century called Methodism. Vol. I. New York: Carlton & Porter.
- —— (1859). The history of the religious movement of the eighteenth century called Methodism. Vol. II. New York: Carlton & Porter.
- —— (1859). The history of the religious movement of the eighteenth century called Methodism. Vol. III. New York: Carlton & Porter.
- Tyerman, Luke (1876). The life of George Whitefield. Vol. I. London: Hodder and Stoughton, Publishers.
- —— (1880). The life and times of the Rev. John Wesley : founder of the Methodists. London: Hodder and Stoughton.
