= Nicholas Clagett =

English bishop

Nicholas Clagett (14 April 1686 – 8 December 1746) was an English bishop.

== Life ==
Claggett was from a clerical family of Bury St Edmunds. He went up to Trinity College, Cambridge aged 16 in April 1702, graduating B.A. in 1705–6, M.A. in 1709 and D.D. in 1724.

He was appointed Archdeacon of Buckingham on 1 September 1722. After this he became Dean of Rochester on 8 February 1724, succeeding on the death of Samuel Pratt, and was elected bishop of St. David's, congé d'élire issued on 17 December 1731. He was allowed to hold in commendam the rectories of Shobrooke and of Overton in the diocese of Winchester. On 2 August 1742 he was translated, becoming Bishop of Exeter. He died on 8 Dec. 1746, and was buried at St. Margaret's, Westminster, with no epitaph.

== Works ==
He published Articles of Enquiry for the Archdeaconry of Buckingham, 1732, and eleven sermons. One was preached before the House of Lords on the anniversary of Charles I's martyrdom, another on the consecration of Bishop White. A Persuasive to an ingenuous trial of Opinions in Religion (1685), sometimes ascribed to him, belongs rather to his father.

== Family ==
He was son of Nicholas Clagett the Younger, minister at Bury St. Edmunds, and nephew of the preacher William Clagett, both sons of the Puritan Nicholas Clagett the elder.

== Sources ==
- This article incorporates text from a publication now in the public domain: "Clagett, Nicholas (d.1746)". Dictionary of National Biography. London: Smith, Elder & Co. 1885–1900.

Church of England titles
Preceded by Elias Sydall	Bishop of St David's; 1731–1743	Succeeded by Edward Willes
Preceded by Stephen Weston	Bishop of Exeter; 1743–1746	Succeeded by George Lavington
