= Sir Robert Cotton, 3rd Baronet =

British politician

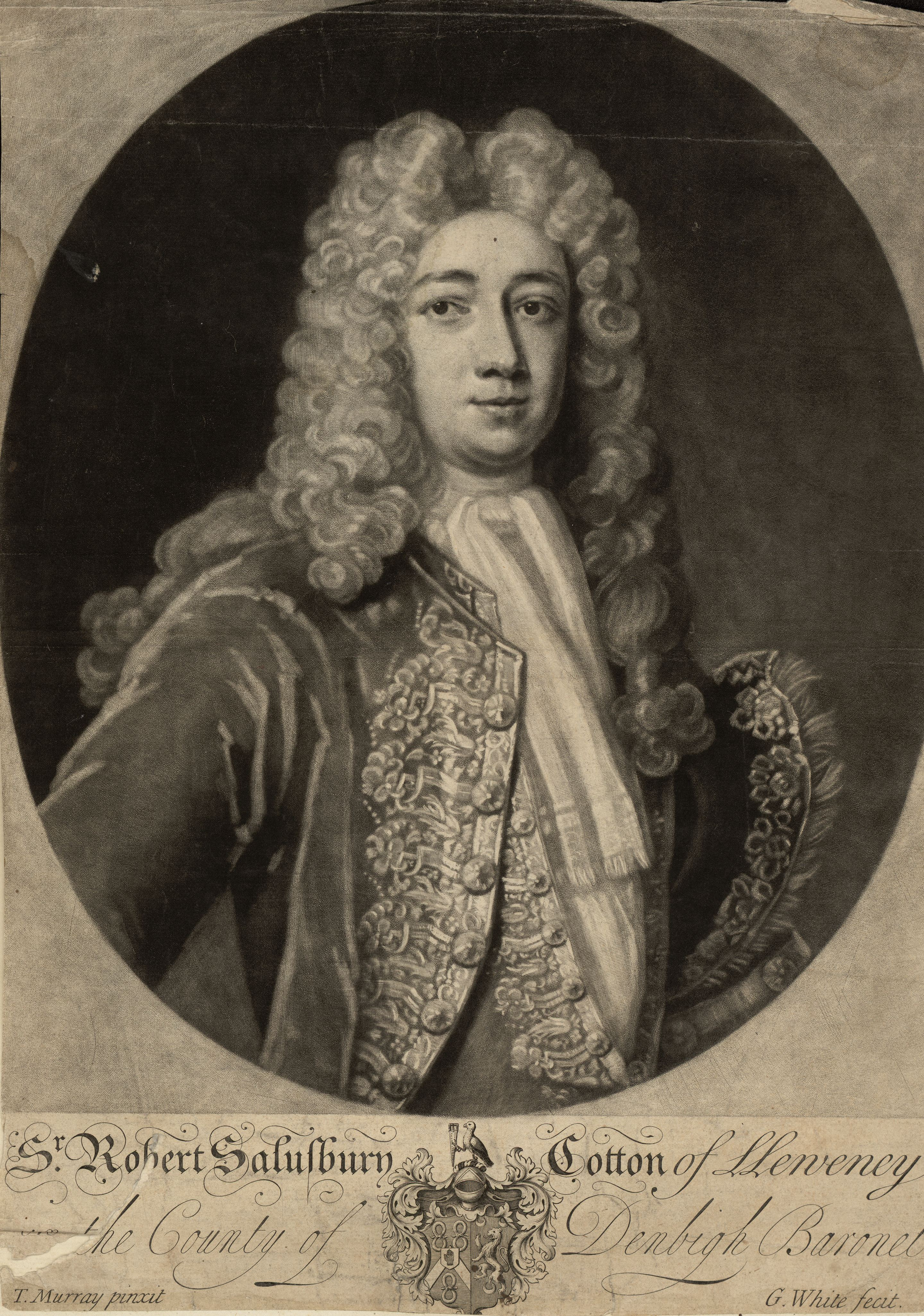
Sir Robert Salusbury Cotton of Lleweney

Sir Robert Salusbury Cotton, 3rd Baronet (2 January 1695 – 27 August 1748) was an English politician who was Member of Parliament (MP) for Cheshire from 1727 to 1734 and for Lostwithiel from 1741 to 1747. He married Elizabeth Tollemache (died 6 August 1746), the daughter of Lionel Tollemache, 3rd Earl of Dysart and his wife Grace Wilbraham. He died without issue and the title passed to his only surviving brother Lynch Salusbury Cotton.

== See also ==
- Viscount Combermere

Parliament of Great Britain
| Preceded by John Offley-Crewe; Charles Cholmondeley | Member of Parliament for Cheshire; 1727–1734; With: Charles Cholmondeley | Succeeded by Charles Cholmondeley; John Crewe |
| Preceded by Richard Edgcumbe; Sir John Crosse | Member of Parliament for Lostwithiel; 1741–1747; With: Sir John Crosse | Succeeded by Richard Edgcumbe, 2nd James Edward Colleton |
Honorary titles
| Preceded by Sir Richard Myddelton | Custos Rotulorum of Denbighshire; 1716–1748 | Succeeded by Richard Myddelton |
| Preceded by The Earl of Cholmondeley | Lord Lieutenant of Denbighshire; 1733–1748 | Succeeded by Richard Myddelton |
Baronetage of England
| Preceded by Thomas Cotton | Baronet (of Combermere); 1715–1748 | Succeeded by Lynch Salusbury Cotton |
