= George Cholmondeley, 3rd Earl of Cholmondeley =

British Army officer and politician (1703–1770)

Lieutenant-General The Right Honourable The Earl of Cholmondeley KB PC
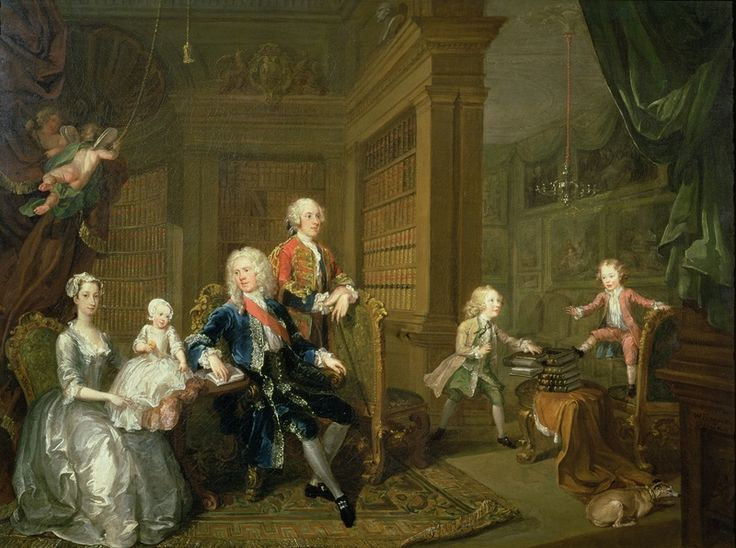
- The Cholmondeley Family, William Hogarth (1732)

Member of the British House of Commons
- In office 1724–1733
- Preceded by: John Smith
- Succeeded by: Sidney Beauclerk
- Constituency: East Looe (1724–1727); Windsor (1727–1733)

Personal details
- Born: 2 January 1703
- Died: 10 June 1770 (aged 67)
- Spouse: Lady Mary Walpole (m. 1723)
- Children: George, Viscount Malpas and Robert
- Parent(s): George Cholmondeley, 2nd Earl of Cholmondeley; Elizabeth van Ruyterburgh

Military service
- Allegiance: Great Britain
- Years of service: 1733–1760

Lieutenant-General George Cholmondeley, 3rd Earl of Cholmondeley, KB, PC (/ˈtʃʌmli/ CHUM-lee; 2 January 1703 – 10 June 1770), styled as Viscount Malpas from 1725 to 1733, was a British Army officer and Whig politician who represented East Looe and Windsor in the House of Commons of Great Britain from 1724 to 1733.

== Life ==
Cholmondeley was the son of George Cholmondeley, 2nd Earl of Cholmondeley, and Elizabeth van Ruyterburgh (or Ruttenburg). He was elected to the House of Commons for East Looe in 1724, a seat he held until 1727, and then represented Windsor between 1727 and 1733, when he succeeded his father as third Earl of Cholmondeley and entered the House of Lords. He held office under his father-in-law Sir Robert Walpole as a Lord of the Admiralty from 1727 to 1729, as a Lord of the Treasury from 1735 to 1736 and as Chancellor of the Duchy of Lancaster from 1736 to 1743 (from 1742 to 1743 under the premiership of The Earl of Wilmington). From 1743 to 1744 he also served as Lord Privy Seal under Henry Pelham and was Joint Vice-Treasurer of Ireland between 1744 and 1757. In 1736, he was admitted to the Privy Council.

Cholmondeley's extravagance outran the income of his offices, and by the end of 1746, he was forced to render up all his property to settle his debts. Horace Walpole described him as "a vain and empty man, shoved up so high by his father-in-law, Sir Robert Walpole, and fallen into contempt and obscurity by his own extravagance and insufficiency." Apart from his political career, Lord Cholmondeley was also Lord Lieutenant of Cheshire and South Wales (less Denbighshire) from 1733 to 1760. He was promoted to colonel in 1745 (raising the 73rd Foot in Chester during the Jacobite rising of 1745), major-general in 1755, and lieutenant-general in 1759. He was also involved in the charitable effort to create a home for foundlings in London, which was hoped would alleviate the problem of child abandonment. The home became known as the Foundling Hospital and Cholmondeley sat on its board as a founding Governor.

== Private life ==
Lord Cholmondeley married Lady Mary Walpole, daughter of Prime Minister Robert Walpole, 1st Earl of Orford, in 1723. They had three sons and a daughter:

- George Cholmondeley, Viscount Malpas (1724–1764)
- Hon. Robert Cholmondeley (1727–1804)
- Hon. Frederick Cholmondeley (d. 29 April 1734), died in infancy
- a daughter, died shortly after birth

Lady Mary died on 21 February 1731/2, at Aix.

Lord Cholmondeley died on 10 June 1770, aged 67. His eldest son George Cholmondeley, Viscount Malpas, predeceased him and he was succeeded in his titles by his grandson George, who was created Marquess of Cholmondeley in 1815. His second son Robert (1727–1804) began his career as a lieutenant in the 3rd Foot Guards but resigned after the Battle of Lauffeld in July 1747 and became a minister. Robert was married to the socialite Mary Woffington.

The actress Maria Nossiter was the daughter of Lord Cholmondeley's "favourite" housekeeper. Maria was educated, had money and enjoyed a successful, but brief, career. It is supposed that she was his daughter.

Parliament of Great Britain
Preceded by John Smith; William Lowndes	Member of Parliament for East Looe; 1724–1727; With: William Lowndes 1724; Sir Henry Hoghton 1724–1727	Succeeded by Sir John Trelawny; Charles Longueville
Preceded by The Earl of Inchiquin; Lord Vere Beauclerk	Member of Parliament for Windsor; 1727–1733; With: Lord Vere Beauclerk	Succeeded by Lord Vere Beauclerk; Lord Sidney Beauclerk
Court offices
Preceded by The Earl Cadogan	Master of the Robes; 1727	Succeeded by Augustus Schutz
New office	Master of the Horse to Frederick, Prince of Wales; 1729–1739	Succeeded by Earl of Middlesex
Political offices
Preceded by The Duke of Rutland	Chancellor of the Duchy of Lancaster; 1736–1743	Succeeded by The Lord Edgcumbe
Preceded by The Lord Gower	Lord Privy Seal; 1743–1744	Succeeded by The Lord Gower
Honorary titles
Preceded by The Earl of Cholmondeley	Lord Lieutenant and Vice-Admiral of Cheshire; 1733–1770	Succeeded by The Earl of Cholmondeley
Preceded by The Earl of Cholmondeley	Lord Lieutenant of Anglesey; 1733–1760	Succeeded by Sir Nicholas Bayly, Bt
Preceded by The Earl of Cholmondeley	Lord Lieutenant of Caernarvonshire; 1733–1760	Succeeded by Thomas Wynn
Preceded by The Earl of Cholmondeley	Lord Lieutenant of Flintshire; 1733–1760	Succeeded by Sir Roger Mostyn, Bt
Preceded by The Earl of Cholmondeley	Lord Lieutenant of Merionethshire; 1733–1760	Vacant Title next held by William Vaughan
Preceded by The Earl of Cholmondeley	Lord Lieutenant of Montgomeryshire; 1733–1760	Succeeded by The Earl of Powis
Peerage of England
Preceded by George Cholmondeley	Earl of Cholmondeley; 1733–1770	Succeeded by George Cholmondeley
