= 1741 in Great Britain =

Events from the year 1741 in Great Britain.

== Incumbents ==
- Monarch – George II
- Prime Minister – Robert Walpole (Whig)

== Events ==
- 13 February – Robert Walpole, the Prime Minister, introduces the term "balance of power" in a speech in Parliament.
- 14 February – Irish-born actor Charles Macklin makes his London stage debut as Shylock in The Merchant of Venice at the Theatre Royal, Drury Lane, pioneering a psychologically realistic style with Shakespeare's text revived, replacing George Granville's melodramatic adaptation The Jew of Venice. Kitty Clive plays the travesti role of Portia.
- March – Lancelot "Capability" Brown joins Lord Cobham's gardening staff at Stowe, Buckinghamshire.
- 13 March – The Royal Navy brings 180 warships, frigates and transport vessels, led by Admiral Edward Vernon, to threaten Cartagena, Colombia, with more than 27,000 crew against the 3,600 defenders.
- 13 April – The Royal Military Academy, Woolwich, is established to train officers of the Royal Artillery and Royal Engineers.
- 9 May – War of Jenkins' Ear: Battle of Cartagena de Indias – Spain's defenders in New Grenada, under the command of General Blas de Lezo, defeat Vernon's Royal Navy force, leading to a British retreat to Jamaica.
- 14 May – HMS Wager, one of the vessels of George Anson's voyage around the world is wrecked on the coast of Chile, killing most of the surviving crew.
- 21 May – George II orders the British Army to prepare for an invasion of Prussia to defend his Electorate of Hanover.
- 11 June – 1741 British general election, begun on 30 April, concludes with Prime Minister Robert Walpole's Whigs retaining their majority in the House of Commons but losing control of a number of rotten and pocket boroughs with 44 seats lost to candidates who have defected to the new Patriot Whigs to oppose Walpole's policies.
- 18 July – War of Jenkins' Ear: Invasion of Cuba – Admiral Edward Vernon arrives at Guantánamo Bay in Cuba.
- 4/5 August–9 December – Vernon captures Guantánamo Bay and renames it Cumberland Bay. His troops hold it but are resisted by local guerrilla forces and withdraw.
- 22 August–14 September – George Frideric Handel composes the oratorio Messiah in London to a libretto compiled by Charles Jennens, completing the "Hallelujah Chorus" on 6 September. It receives a private rehearsal in Chester in November while Handel is en route to Dublin.
- 12 October – George II, as Elector of Hanover, signs the Neustadt Protocol with France, but fails to inform his British government until after his return from Germany.
- 19 October – Actor David Garrick makes his London stage debut, in the title role of Shakespeare's Richard III, having made his professional debut at Ipswich in Oroonoko earlier in the year.
- 11 December – At 11 a.m. a "fire-ball" and explosion, perhaps resulting from a meteor, is heard over southern England.
- Summer – Upper Priory Cotton Mill is opened in Birmingham as the world's first mechanised cotton mill by Lewis Paul and John Wyatt; although this is not a commercial success, other Paul-Wyatt cotton mills follow.
- Henry Hoare begins to lay out the landscape gardens at Stourhead, Wiltshire.

== Publications ==
- April – Henry Fielding's anonymous An Apology for the Life of Mrs. Shamela Andrews satirising Samuel Richardson's novel Pamela.
- Isaac Watts' The Improvement of the Mind.

== Births ==
- 6 January – Sarah Trimmer, née Kirby, writer for children (died 1810)
- 27 January – Hester Thrale, née Salusbury, diarist (died 1821)
- 17 March – William Withering, physician (died 1799)
- c. April/May? – Henry Cort, ironmaster (died 1800)
- 11 September – Arthur Young, agriculturist and writer on social and political matters (died 1820)

== Deaths ==
- 21 February – Jethro Tull, agriculturist (born 1674)
- 10 April – Celia Fiennes, travel writer (born 1662)
- 24 May – Lord Augustus FitzRoy, Royal Navy officer (born 1716)
- August – David Owen, Welsh harpist (born 1712)
- 31 December – Andrew Archer, politician (born 1659)

== See also ==
- 1741 in Wales
