= Upper Priory Cotton Mill =

Pioneering cotton mill in Birmingham, England (1740s)

Coordinates: 52.4822°N 1.8944°W

The Upper Priory Cotton Mill, opened in Birmingham, England in the summer of 1741, was the world's first mechanised cotton-spinning factory or cotton mill. Established by Lewis Paul and John Wyatt in a former warehouse in the Upper Priory, near Paul's house in Old Square, it was the first of the Paul-Wyatt cotton mills that used the roller spinning machinery that they had developed and that had been patented by Paul in 1738, that for the first time enabled the spinning of cotton "without the aid of human fingers". Wyatt had realised that this machinery would enable several machines to be powered from a single source of power: foreseeing the development of the factory system, he envisaged "a kind of mill, with wheels turned either by horses, water or wind."

== History ==
Finance for the Upper Priory enterprise came from Paul himself; from Thomas Warren, the Birmingham bookseller and newspaper publisher; Edward Cave, London-based publisher of The Gentleman's Magazine; and Robert James, a notable physician and inventor of a well-known "fever powder". The latter three were friends of the author and lexicographer Samuel Johnson, who had lived in Birmingham during the 1730s and whose family had been connected to that of Wyatt in Lichfield, and Johnson may have been responsible for introducing them to Paul.

The mill consisted of fifty spindles, turned by "two asses walking around an axis" and was tended initially by ten women. Contemporary observers make it clear that the machine was fundamentally effective, and hopes for the venture were initially very high. James wrote to Warren in July 1740: "Yesterday we went to see Mr. Paul's machine, which gave us all entire satisfaction both in regard to the carding and spinning. You have nothing to do but to get a purchaser for your grant; the sight of the thing is demonstration enough. I am certain that if Paul could begin with £10,000 he must or at least might get more money in twenty years than the City of London is worth." By 1743, however, the Upper Priory Mill was almost derelict.

Wyatt, who had assisted with the setting up of the mill, had offered to oversee its operation from December 1741, but was imprisoned for debt in the Fleet Prison in June 1742. A letter written to Wyatt during this period suggests the mill was badly mismanaged in his absence: "I think there's not one ass left alive, so what's done is only done by hand. There's not a man left at the work, but one Mr Rodgers an old man that came down from London when he could stay no longer, and he I find can't get money to live upon and almost starved...." Wyatt tried to gain orders for yarn from the mill when he was released in October 1743 but there is no record of the mill beyond this point, though it may have been the machinery from the Upper Priory that Wyatt sent to Northampton in 1757.

A key weak point of Paul and Wyatt's machinery was its frailty, which saw it frequently out of order and in need of expensive repairs. It has also been suggested that the inability of Paul or Wyatt to organise a manufacturing operation with the necessary level of discipline and supervision may have been a key reason for the mill's failure. Andrew Ure wrote that Wyatt was "favourably placed, in a mechanical point of view, for maturing his admirable scheme. But he was a gentle and passive spirit, little qualified to cope with the hardships of a new manufacturing enterprise. It required, in fact, a man of a Napoleon nerve and ambition, to subdue the refractory tempers of work-people accustomed to irregular paroxysms of diligence." Matthew Boulton, whose own Soho Manufactory successfully organised industrial production on an unprecedented scale from the 1760s onwards, was later to recall the Paul-Wyatt mill as "a good Cotton spinning mill" that "would have got money had it been in good hands".

Despite the commercial failure of Paul and Wyatt's own factory, further mills were established using their machinery in Northampton and Leominster, and a second mill established in Birmingham, which remained in operation at least until the mid-1750s.

== See also ==
- Marvel's Mill – opened in Northampton in 1742 and operating for over 15 years; the second cotton mill to use the Paul-Wyatt machinery
- Pinsley Mill – another mill using the Paul-Wyatt machinery, opened by Daniel Bourn in Leominster some time between 1744 and 1748
- Cromford Mill – opened by Richard Arkwright in Derbyshire in 1771, which used machinery very similar to that of Paul and Wyatt and was the first cotton mill to be highly profitable

== Bibliography ==
- Baker, John Leon (2004), "Wyatt, John (1700–1766), inventor of machinery", Oxford Dictionary of National Biography (Online ed.), Oxford University Press
- Brown, John J. (January 1946), "Samuel Johnson and the First Roller-Spinning Machine", The Modern Language Review, 41 (1): 16–23, doi:10.2307/3717489, JSTOR 3717489
- Fitton, R. S. (1989), The Arkwrights: spinners of fortune, Manchester: Manchester University Press, ISBN 0-7190-2646-6
- Mantoux, Paul (1928), The Industrial Revolution in the Eighteenth Century: An Outline of the Beginnings of the Modern Factory System in England, Taylor & Francis (published 2006), ISBN 0-415-37839-7
- Marglin, Stephen A. (2001) [1974], "What do bosses do? The origins and functions of hierarchy in capitalist production", in Warwick Organizational Behaviour Staff (ed.), Organizational Studies: Critical Perspectives on Business and Management, Routledge, pp. 25–68, ISBN 0-415-21554-4
- Wadsworth, Alfred P.; Mann, Julia De Lacy (1931), The cotton trade and industrial Lancashire, 1600-1780, Manchester: Manchester University Press, OCLC 2859370
