= Samuel Touchet =

Samuel Touchet (ca. 1705 – 28 May 1773) was an English cotton merchant, manufacturer and politician.

Born in Manchester, he was himself the son of a cotton trader and manufacturer and he started his career representing his father's business in London. His career importing raw cotton from the Levant and the West Indies was successful to the extent that manufacturers in Manchester began to suspect him of seeking a monopoly.

In 1742 he became involved with the Birmingham inventors Lewis Paul and John Wyatt, who had designed the first machinery to successfully spin cotton mechanically, receiving a grant for 300 spindles off Wyatt. In 1744 Touchet and a partner called Bowker set the spindles up at Touchet's Mill in Birmingham in association with Paul and with assistance from Wyatt. Little is known of the fate of this mill, but it was sufficiently successful for Touchet later to secure the lease of Marvel's Mill in Northampton, another of the Paul-Wyatt cotton mills, from Edward Cave.

As Touchet became very wealthy over the course of the 1750s his business interests diversified into shipping, insurance broking and the sugar and slave trades. He partnered up on two ships out of Liverpool, the Lydia and the Favourite, 1757 and 1761, respectively. In just those two voyages over 1,000 slaves were taken. Touchet became the MP for Shaftesbury in 1761 but his business foundered that year's financial crisis and was taken over by his creditors in 1763, with Touchet remaining an MP until 1768.

== Bibliography ==
- Kidd, Alan J. (2008), "Touchet, Samuel (c.1705–1773), merchant and politician", Oxford Dictionary of National Biography, Oxford University Press
- Wadsworth, Alfred P.; Mann, Julia De Lacy (1931), The cotton trade and industrial Lancashire, 1600–1780, Manchester: Manchester University Press, OCLC 2859370
