= Pinsley Mill =

Coordinates: 52.2275°N 2.7319°W

Pinsley Mill, also known as Etnam Street Mill, is a former watermill in Leominster, Herefordshire, England.

It was one of Leominster's first mills, situated where the Pinsley Brook left the monastic precinct around Leominster Priory, and was mentioned in a lease of 1675 as a "watercorne" mill.

At some time between 1744 and 1748 it was reopened by Daniel Bourn as a cotton mill, one of the Paul-Wyatt cotton mills built to house the roller spinning machinery invented by Lewis Paul and John Wyatt, that first enabled the spinning of cotton "without the aid of human fingers". Bourn's mill operated successfully as a mill until 1754, when it was destroyed by fire.

The mill was rebuilt and returned to its original function as a corn mill, remaining in use until the Second World War.

The mill was vandalised and set alight several times in 2010 – 2013. It was demolished in 2014.

== Bibliography ==
- Day, Lance; McNeil, Ian (2005), "Bourn, Daniel", Biographical Dictionary of the History of Technology, London: Routledge, ISBN 0203028295
- Greene, Miranda (2005), The Mills of Leominster, Herefordshire Through Time, Hereford: Herefordshire Council, archived from the original on 2013-12-12
- Mantoux, Paul (2006) [1928], The Industrial Revolution in the Eighteenth Century: An Outline of the Beginnings of the Modern Factory System in England, tr. Vernon, Marjorie, London: Taylor & Francis, ISBN 0415378397
- Wadsworth, Alfred P.; Mann, Julia De Lacy (1931), The cotton trade and industrial Lancashire, 1600–1780, Manchester: Manchester University Press, p. 431, OCLC 2859370
