= 1741 =

1741 in various calendars
- Gregorian calendar: 1741; MDCCXLI
- Ab urbe condita: 2494
- Armenian calendar: 1190; ԹՎ ՌՃՂ
- Assyrian calendar: 6491
- Balinese saka calendar: 1662–1663
- Bengali calendar: 1147–1148
- Berber calendar: 2691
- British Regnal year: 14 Geo. 2 – 15 Geo. 2
- Buddhist calendar: 2285
- Burmese calendar: 1103
- Byzantine calendar: 7249–7250
- Chinese calendar: 庚申年 (Metal Monkey); 4438 or 4231 — to — 辛酉年 (Metal Rooster); 4439 or 4232
- Coptic calendar: 1457–1458
- Discordian calendar: 2907
- Ethiopian calendar: 1733–1734
- Hebrew calendar: 5501–5502
- Hindu calendars
- Vikram Samvat: 1797–1798
- Shaka Samvat: 1662–1663
- Kali Yuga: 4841–4842
- Holocene calendar: 11741
- Igbo calendar: 741–742
- Iranian calendar: 1119–1120
- Islamic calendar: 1153–1154
- Japanese calendar: Genbun 6 / Kanpō 1 (寛保元年)
- Javanese calendar: 1665–1666
- Julian calendar: Gregorian minus 11 days
- Korean calendar: 4074
- Minguo calendar: 171 before ROC 民前171年
- Nanakshahi calendar: 273
- Thai solar calendar: 2283–2284
- Tibetan calendar: ལྕགས་ཕོ་སྤྲེ་ལོ་ (male Iron-Monkey); 1867 or 1486 or 714 — to — ལྕགས་མོ་བྱ་ལོ་ (female Iron-Bird); 1868 or 1487 or 715

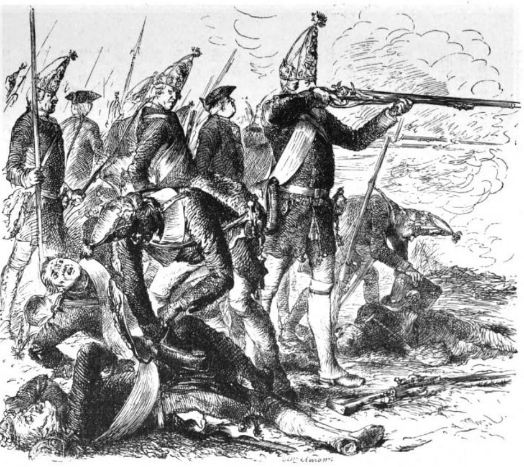
April 10 – Prussian grenadiers achieve victory over Austrians in the Battle of Mollwitz.

1741 (MDCCXLI) was a common year starting on Sunday of the Gregorian calendar and a common year starting on Thursday of the Julian calendar, the 1741st year of the Common Era (CE) and Anno Domini (AD) designations, the 741st year of the 2nd millennium, the 41st year of the 18th century, and the 2nd year of the 1740s decade. As of the start of 1741, the Gregorian calendar was 11 days ahead of the Julian calendar, which remained in localized use until 1923.

== Events ==
=== January–March ===
- January 13
  - Lanesborough, Massachusetts is created as a township.
  - Conventicle Act of 1741 is introduced in Denmark-Norway, forbidding lay preachers from holding religious services without the approval of the local Lutheran pastor; this remains in force for about a century.
- February 13 – Sir Robert Walpole, the prime minister of Great Britain, popularizes the term "the balance of power" in a speech in Parliament.
- February 14 – Irish-born actor Charles Macklin makes his London stage debut as Shylock in The Merchant of Venice at the Theatre Royal, Drury Lane, pioneering a psychologically realistic style with Shakespeare's text revived, replacing George Granville's melodramatic adaptation The Jew of Venice. Kitty Clive plays the travesti role of Portia.
- March 9 – War of the Austrian Succession: Prussian troops bring down the Austrian fortress of Glogau (modern-day Głogów in Poland).
- March 13 – The British Royal Navy takes 180 warships, frigates and transport vessels, led by Admiral Edward Vernon, to threaten Cartagena, Colombia, with more than 27,000 crew against the 3,600 defenders.

=== April–June ===
- April 6 – The New York Slave Insurrection, a plot to set fire to New York City, is discovered.
- April 10 – War of the Austrian Succession: Battle of Mollwitz – An Austrian army is defeated by Prussian troops led by General von Schwerin, although the new Prussian king Frederick the Great leaves the battlefield early in the belief of imminent defeat.
- May 4 – Vitus Bering sets out from Petropavlovsk-Kamchatsky to map the coasts of Siberia and Alaska.
- May 9 – War of Jenkins' Ear: Battle of Cartagena de Indias – Spain's defenders in New Grenada, under the command of General Blas de Lezo, defeat Edward Vernon's Royal Navy force, leading to a British retreat to Jamaica.
- May 14 – HMS Wager, one of the vessels of George Anson's voyage around the world, is wrecked on the coast of Chile, killing most of the crew who have survived scurvy.
- May 15 – Nader Shah, Emperor of Persia, narrowly escapes an assassination attempt.
- May 21 – War of the Austrian Succession: King George II of Great Britain orders the British Army to prepare for an invasion of Prussia to defend his Electorate of Hanover.
- June 11 – 1741 British general election, begun on April 30, concludes with Prime Minister Robert Walpole's Whigs retaining their majority in the House of Commons but losing 44 seats to candidates who have defected to the new Patriot Whigs to oppose his policies.
- June 25 – Maria Theresa of Austria is crowned Queen Regnant of Hungary in Bratislava.

=== July–September ===
- July 8 – Jonathan Edwards repeats his Sinners in the Hands of an Angry God sermon at Enfield, Connecticut.
- July 15 – Alexei Chirikov sights land in Southeast Alaska, and sends some men aboard his ship ashore in a longboat, making them the first Europeans to visit Alaska.
- August 4–5 – War of Jenkins' Ear: Invasion of Cuba – British Admiral Edward Vernon captures Guantánamo Bay in Cuba, which he renames Cumberland Bay, but which his forces are forced to abandon on December 9.
- August 10 – Raja Marthanda Varma of Travancore defeats the Dutch East India Company in the Battle of Colachel, ending the Dutch colonial rule in India and marking the first "major" defeat of a European colonial military power in India.
- August 23 – At least 2,000 die along the shores of the Sea of Japan after a volcanic eruption on an island generated the Kampo Tsunami.
- September 11 – War of the Austrian Succession: Linz falls to the Bavarian Army.

=== October–December ===
- October 12 – George II, as Elector of Hanover, signs the Neustadt Protocol with France, but fails to inform his British government until after his return from Germany.
- November 25–26 – War of the Austrian Succession: Battle of Prague – Franco-Bavarian troops commanded by Maurice of Saxony storm and capture the Austrian city of Prague.
- December 6 (November 25, O.S.) – Elizabeth of Russia becomes czarina after a palace coup.
- December 7
  - War of the Austrian Succession: Charles Albert of Bavaria has himself proclaimed King of Bohemia.
  - Aleksei Chirikov of Russia presents the first written description of the northwest coast of North America.
- December 19 – Vitus Bering dies during his expedition, east of Siberia.
- December 25 – Anders Celsius develops his own thermometer scale, Centigrade, the predecessor of the Celsius scale.

=== Date unknown ===
- Summer – Upper Priory Cotton Mill is opened in Birmingham, England, as the world's first mechanised cotton mill by Lewis Paul and John Wyatt; although this is not a commercial success, other Paul-Wyatt cotton mills follow.
- Stemmatographia by Hristofor Zhefarovich, regarded as the first Serbian and Bulgarian secular printed book, is printed in Vienna.
- The Royal Order of Scotland in freemasonry is founded.

== Births ==
- January 14 – Benedict Arnold, American Revolutionary War general, traitor (d. 1801)
- January 27 – Hester Thrale, Welsh diarist (d. 1821)
- February 7 – Henry Fuseli, Swiss painter and writer (d. 1825)

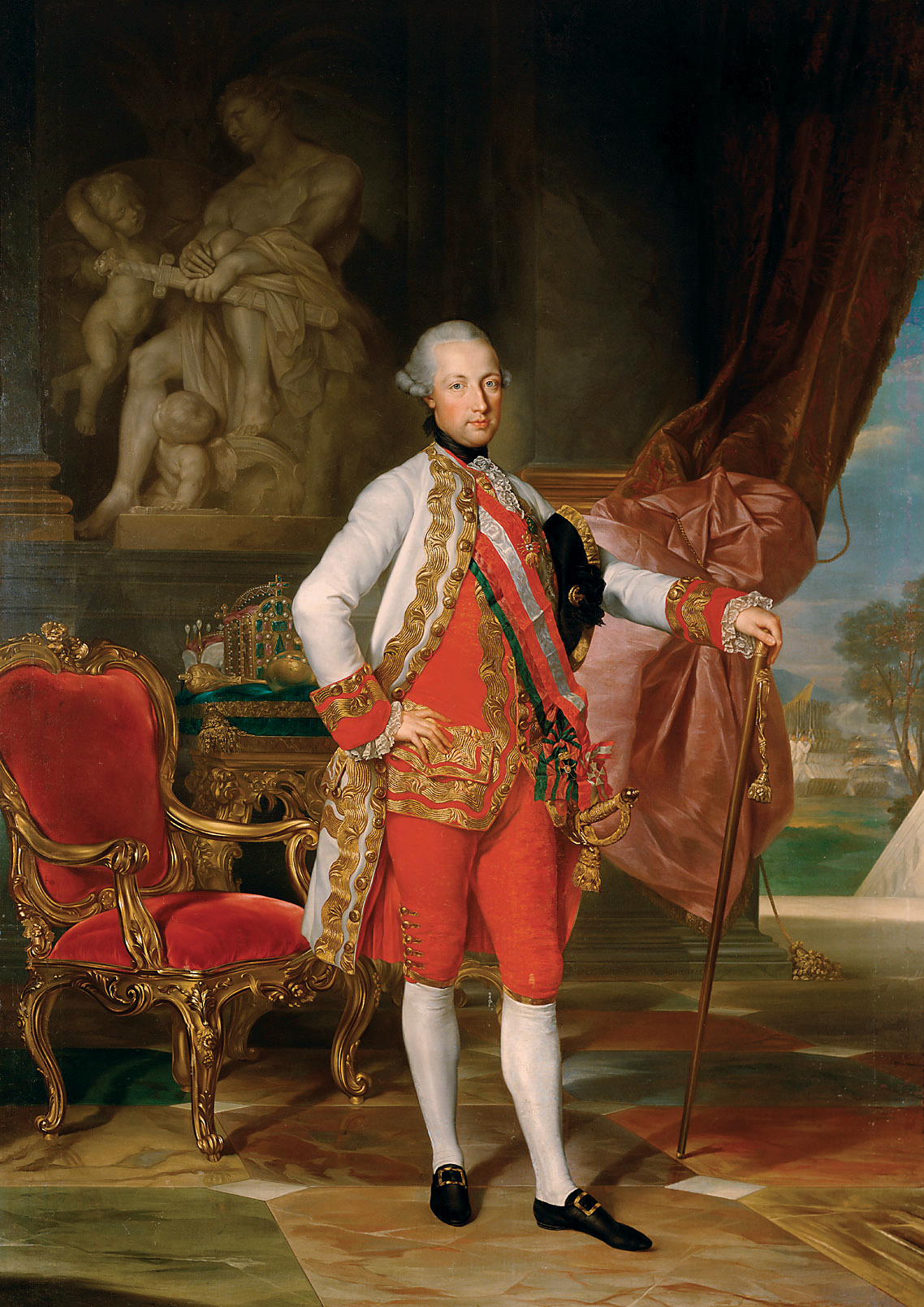
Joseph II, Holy Roman Emperor

- March 13 – Joseph II, Holy Roman Emperor (d. 1790)
- March 17 – William Withering, British physician (d. 1799)
- March 20 – Jean Antoine Houdon, French sculptor (d. 1828)
- April 14 – Emperor Momozono of Japan (d. 1762)
- May 13 – Ingeborg Akeleye, Norwegian noble known for her love life (d. 1800)
- May 23 – Andrea Luchesi, Italian composer (d. 1801)
- June 11 – Joseph Warren, American Patriot, physician (d. 1775)
- June 26 – John Langdon, American politician (d. 1819)
- September 22 – Peter Simon Pallas, German zoologist (d. 1811)
- October 4 – Edmond Malone, Irish scholar (d. 1812)
- October 18 – Pierre Choderlos de Laclos, French general, author (d. 1803)
- October 24 – Johann August von Starck, German pastor (d. 1816)
- November 15 – Johann Kaspar Lavater, Swiss physiognomist (d. 1801)
- Date unknown –
  - Nikolaos Koutouzis, Greek painter, poet and priest (d. 1813)
  - Catherine Antonovna of Brunswick, German-Russian noble (d. 1807)
  - Gelelemend, Lenape chief (d. 1811)

== Deaths ==
- January 15 – Ramon Despuig, Spanish-born 67th Grandmaster of the Knights Hospitaller (b. 1670)
- February 13 – Johann Joseph Fux, Austrian composer (b. 1660)
- February 21 – Jethro Tull, British agriculturist (b. 1674)
- March 16 – Eleonora Luisa Gonzaga, Tuscan princess (b. 1686)
- March 17 – Jean-Baptiste Rousseau, French poet (b. 1671)
- March 31 – Pieter Burmann the Elder, Dutch classical scholar (b. 1668)
- April 10 – Celia Fiennes, English travel writer (b. 1662)
- May 21 – Henry Dawnay, 2nd Viscount Downe, Irish peer (b. 1664)
- May 24 – Lord Augustus FitzRoy, Royal Navy officer during the Battle of Cartagena de Indias (b. 1716)
- May 25 – Daniel Ernst Jablonski, German theologian (b. 1660)
- June 14 – Landgravine Caroline of Hesse-Rotenburg, German noble (b. 1714)
- June 18 – François Pourfour du Petit, French anatomist, ophthalmologist and surgeon (b. 1664)
- July 3 – Elisabeth Therese of Lorraine, Sardinian queen consort (b. 1711)

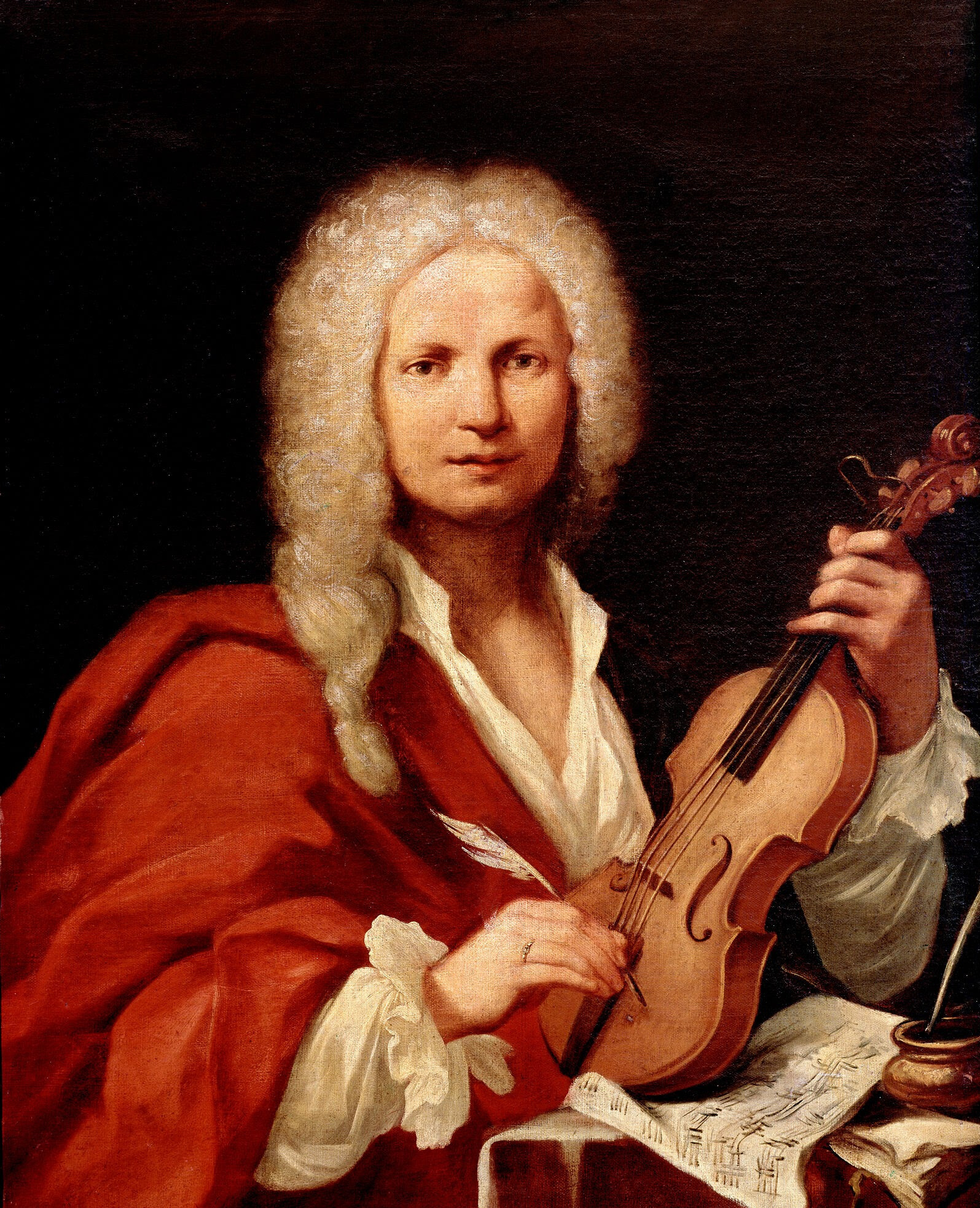
Antonio Vivaldi

- July 28 – Antonio Vivaldi, Italian composer (b. 1678)
- August 4 – Andrew Hamilton, American lawyer (b. 1676)
- August 31 – Johann Gottlieb Heineccius, German jurist (b. 1681)
- September 7 – Blas de Lezo, Spanish admiral (b. 1689)
- September 28 – Edward Bayly, Irish politician (b. 1684)
- October 12 – Joseph Talcott, British Governor of the Connecticut Colony for more than 17 years, since 1724. (b. 1670)
- November 18 – Stephen Delancey, major colonial New York figure (b. 1663)
- November 24 – Queen Ulrika Eleonora of Sweden (b.1688)
- December 14 – Charles Rollin, French historian (b. 1661)
- December 19 – Vitus Bering, Danish-born Russian explorer (b. 1681)
- December 21 – Bernard de Montfaucon, French Benedictine monk (b. 1655)
- December 31 – Andrew Archer, English politician (b. 1659)
