= Paul-Wyatt cotton mills =

UK manufactures in the 18th century

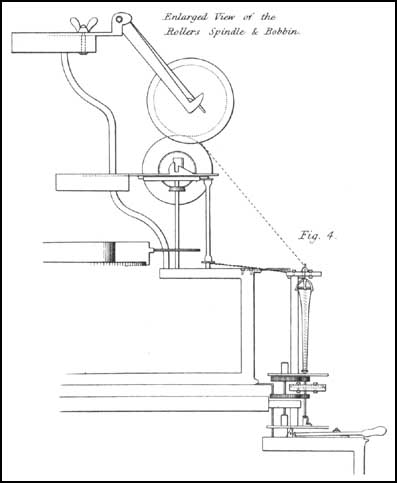
Diagram of rollers and bobbin from Paul's 1758 patent.

The Paul-Wyatt cotton mills were the world's first mechanised cotton spinning factories. Operating from 1741 until 1764 they were built to house the roller spinning machinery invented by Lewis Paul and John Wyatt. They were not very profitable but they spun cotton successfully for several decades.

== Development ==
In 1738 Lewis Paul and John Wyatt obtained a patent for a cotton spinning machine that for the first time used the principle of two sets of rollers travelling at different speeds to enable fully mechanical spinning. The patent outlined the two key developments that were later to underlie both Richard Arkwright's water frame and James Hargreaves' spinning jenny, and made it possible for a single power source to drive more than one spinning machine. Wyatt envisaged "a kind of mill, with wheels turned either by horses, water or wind."

Using this technology, and with financial support provided by associates of the author Samuel Johnson, in the summer of 1741 Paul and Wyatt set up the Upper Priory Cotton Mill in Birmingham, the first mill to spin cotton "without the aid of human fingers". The mill "containing fifty rollers ... turned by two donkeys walking round an axis" was not a commercial success, with Wyatt unable to enforce the levels of organisation and discipline that an operation on this scale demanded; Andrew Ure was to comment that Wyatt was "favourably placed, in a mechanical point of view, for maturing his admirable scheme" but "a gentle and passive spirit, little qualified to cope with the hardships of a new manufacturing enterprise". Two years after its opening the mill was described as being in a "pitiful state" and in 1743 Wyatt was incarcerated in the Fleet Prison for debt. Matthew Boulton was later to observe that the Paul-Wyatt mill "would have got money had it been in good hands", but nothing is known of it after Wyatt's release in October 1743.

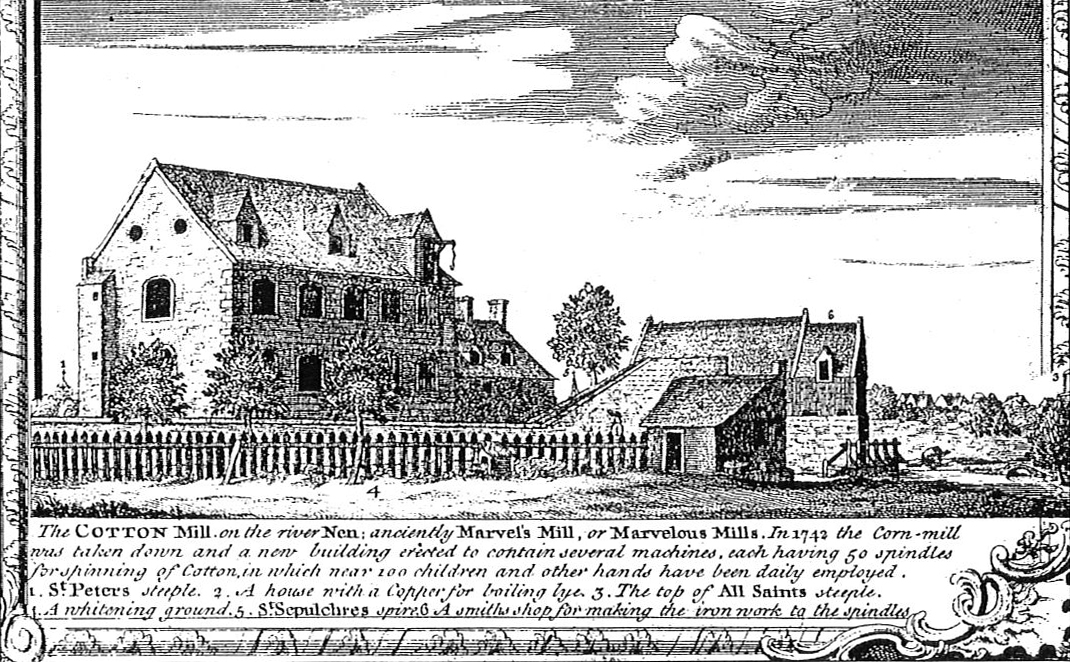
Marvel's Mill in Northampton pictured in 1746 - the earliest known pictorial representation of a cotton mill.

Four other mills were set up using the Paul-Wyatt machinery in the following years. Edward Cave – publisher of The Gentleman's Magazine and one of the friends of Dr Johnson who had funded the development of Paul and Wyatt's invention – experimented in London with running the machinery by hand and by 1742 had set up 250 spindles at Marvell's Mill, a watermill in Northampton. This was the first cotton mill to be driven by water power. Cave experienced similar problems organising his workforce to Paul and Wyatt ("I have not got half my people come to work today" he wrote to Wyatt, "and I have no great fascination in the prospect I have to put myself in the power of such people") and the mill generated little profit, but was to continue operation until about 1764. Samuel Touchet set up a second Birmingham mill in conjunction with Paul and Wyatt in 1744; little is known of its fate, but it was sufficiently encouraging for Touchet to lease the Northampton mill from Cave for a period up to 1755.

The final mill was Pinsley Mill established by Daniel Bourn in Leominster. This may have been in operation by 1744, but is first mentioned in 1748, when both Bourn and Paul patented machinery for carding cotton - a premilinary process that must be undertaken before spinning. Bourn's mill burned down in 1754 but must have had a considerable reputation, as the Manchester Mercury's report of the fire described it as being "erected there with great expense and skill" and "viewed with great pleasure and admiration by travellers and all who had seen them"
