= Thomas Yeoman =

Thomas Yeoman FRS
- Born: 1709 or 1710; Probably Somerset, England
- Died: 23 January 1781 (age about 70)
- Resting place: Bunhill Fields
- Occupations: Millwright; Surveyor; Civil engineer
- Known for: First president of the Society of Civil Engineers
- Notable work: Limehouse Cut

Thomas Yeoman (1709 or 1710 – 23 January 1781) was a millwright, surveyor and civil engineer who played a significant part in the early industrial revolution and became the first president of the first engineering society in the world, the Society of Civil Engineers, now known as the Smeatonian Society of Civil Engineers.

== Northampton ==
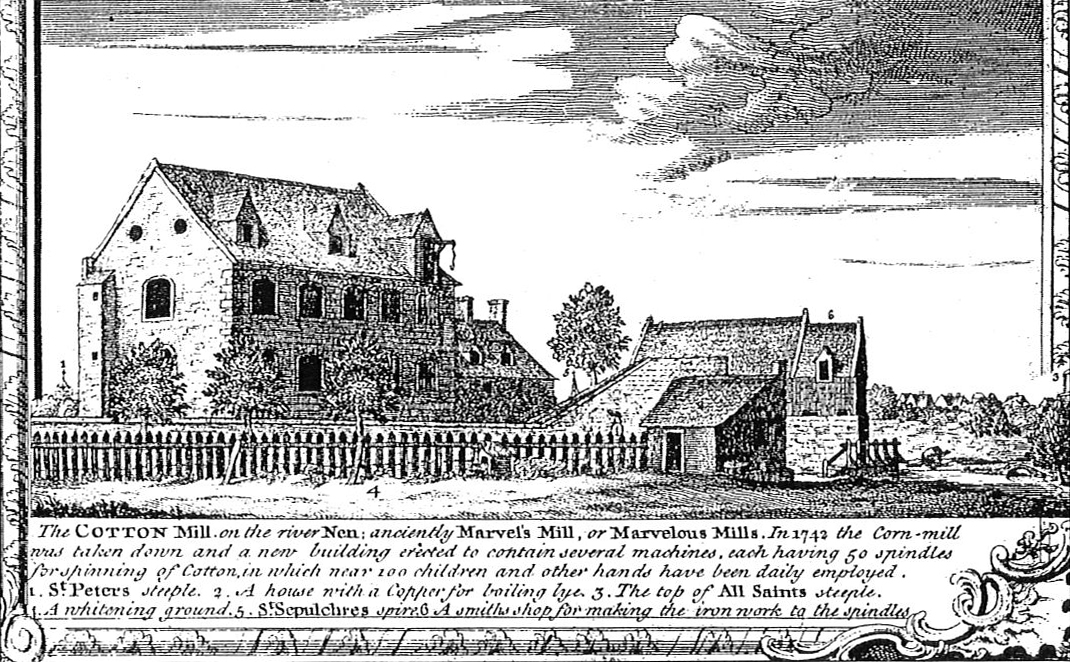
"The Cotton Mill on the River Nen", (Marvel's Mill) from Noble and Butlin's 1746 map of Northampton – the earliest known pictorial representation of a cotton mill

Although his origin and early life are obscure, he was probably born in Somerset and is first known as a wheelwright skilled in "turning iron & Brass, & making machinery for grinding" recruited by Edward Cave to operate a water-powered cotton roller-spinning mill at Northampton in 1741 under licence from Lewis Paul. He was here with his wife Sarah and their son James. Yeoman established himself as a millwright constructing machinery such as ventilators invented by the clergyman Stephen Hales and began to take an active part in Northampton's business. Yeoman was a notable member of the local Baptist Church in College Lane. Yeoman's contribution to society in general was rewarded when he became president of the Northampton Philosophical Society. This society met in his house and included the inventor William Shipley and nonconformist leader Philip Doddridge among its members.

As his social standing rose he moved first to Gold Street, where he built and sold scientific instruments, and then to Bridge Street. His ventilators sold as far as Rotterdam, for use on the British merchant fleet. He also first surveyed the river Nene in 1744.

Yeoman and his wife had another son, Samuel, before Sarah died in 1746. He married Anne Remington on 18 August 1747 and they had a son Thomas in 1748 and a daughter Anne in 1752.

Yeoman’s talents also extended to surveying, which he was already trying his hand at in 1752 when he drew up a map of the estate of the late Bartholomew Clarke of Hardingstone, a wealthy Turkey Merchant and grandfather of Edward Bouverie, who would later purchase Delapre Abbey.

== London ==
In 1756, Yeoman moved to London where he advertised his services in The Gentleman's Magazine and took up residence in Little Peter Street, Westminster. He had Admiralty contracts to install ventilators both in ships of the fleet and in their naval hospitals. He also ventilated the Drury Lane Theatre and the Houses of Parliament. He was elected to the Society of Arts which was founded by his friend William Shipley in the 1760s. He introduced other members and he was the active chairman of the Committee of Mechanics for many years.

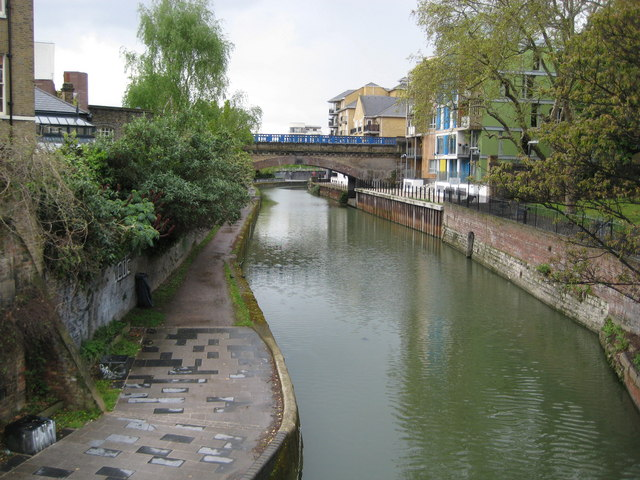
Limehouse cut, connecting the Lee Navigation to the Thames

On arrival in London he gave evidence to the parliamentary commission for the River Nene and in 1758 was employed as surveyor and engineer on the works. After this his main work was as surveyor and engineer on numerous canal and river navigations including the Stort, Lea, Chelmer, Medway, Stroud and Thames. In many of these he worked as an assistant to John Smeaton and a major achievement was the Limehouse Cut which allowed shipping to avoid the sinuous River Lea. As early as 1763 he was described as a "surveyor and civil engineer" by Thomas Mortimer's Universal Director, together with John Smeaton, one of the first recorded uses of the term. He was elected a Fellow of the Royal Society in 1764, described on his application citation as an Inspector of Ventilators in his Majestys Fleet.

In 1771 Smeaton and Yeoman were joined Robert Mylne, Joseph Nickalls (1725–1793), John Grundy, John Thompson, and James King at the King's Head in Holborn where they "agreed that the civil engineers of this Kingdom do form themselves into a Society". This was the "first group of non-military engineers in the English-speaking world". He was elected the first president of a Society of Civil Engineers in 1771 which was later called the Smeatonian Society. (This society was to become the Institution of Civil Engineers in 1818.) Yeoman probably made President because of his seniority but it was a position he approached with enthusiasm taking the notes for the first few meetings and also covering parts of its costs. Yeoman died a widower in 1781, being buried in Bunhill Fields.
