= 18th century =

One hundred years, from 1701 to 1800

The adoption of the Declaration of Independence among the previous Thirteen Colonies was a defining moment in the American Revolution, one of the most consequential geopolitical affairs of the 18th century

The 18th century lasted from 1 January 1701 to 31 December 1800. During the 18th century, elements of Enlightenment thinking culminated in the Atlantic Revolutions. Revolutions began to challenge the legitimacy of monarchical and aristocratic power structures. The Industrial Revolution began mid-century, leading to radical changes in human society and the environment. The European colonization of the Americas and other parts of the world intensified and associated mass migrations of people grew in size as part of the Age of Sail. During the century, slave trading expanded across the shores of the Atlantic Ocean, while declining in Russia and China.

Western historians have occasionally defined the 18th century otherwise for the purposes of their work. For example, the "short" 18th century may be defined as 1715–1789, denoting the period of time between the death of Louis XIV of France and the start of the French Revolution, with an emphasis on directly interconnected events. To historians who expand the century to include larger historical movements, the "long" 18th century may run from the Glorious Revolution of 1688 to the Battle of Waterloo in 1815 or even later. France was the dominant world power in Europe from 1659, after it defeated Spain, until 1815, when it was defeated by Britain and its coalitions following the Napoleonic Wars.

In Europe, philosophers ushered in the Age of Enlightenment. This period coincided with the French Revolution of 1789 and was later compromised by the excesses of the Reign of Terror. At first, many monarchies of Europe embraced Enlightenment ideals, but in the wake of the French Revolution they feared loss of power and formed broad coalitions to oppose the French Republic in the French Revolutionary Wars. Various conflicts throughout the century, including the War of the Spanish Succession and the Seven Years' War, saw Great Britain triumph over its rivals to become the preeminent power in Europe. However, Britain's attempts to exert its authority over the Thirteen Colonies became a catalyst for the American Revolution. The 18th century also marked the end of the Polish–Lithuanian Commonwealth as an independent state. Its semi-democratic government system was not robust enough to prevent partition by the neighboring states of Austria, Prussia, and Russia.

In West Asia, Nader Shah led Iran in successful military campaigns. The Ottoman Empire experienced a period of peace, taking no part in European wars from 1740 to 1768. As a result, the empire was not exposed to Europe's military improvements during the Seven Years' War. The Ottoman military consequently lagged behind and suffered several defeats against Russia in the second half of the century.

In South Asia, the death of Mughal emperor Aurangzeb was followed by the expansion of the Maratha Confederacy and an increasing level of European influence and control in the region. In 1739, Persian emperor Nader Shah invaded and plundered Delhi, the capital of the Mughal Empire. Later, his general Ahmad Shah Durrani scored another victory against the Marathas, the then dominant power in India, in the Third Battle of Panipat in 1761. By the middle of the century, the British East India Company began to conquer eastern India, and by the end of the century, the Anglo-Mysore Wars against Tipu Sultan and his father Hyder Ali, led to Company rule over the south.

In East Asia, the century was marked by the High Qing era, a period characterized by significant cultural and territorial expansion. This period also experienced relative peace and prosperity, allowing for societal growth, increasing literacy rates, flourishing trade, and consolidating imperial power across the vast Qing dynasty's territories. Conversely, the continual seclusion policy of the Tokugawa shogunate also brought a peaceful era called Pax Tokugawa and experienced a flourishment of the arts as well as scientific knowledge and advancements, which were introduced to Japan through the Dutch port of Nagasaki. In Southeast Asia, the Konbaung–Ayutthaya Wars and the Tây Sơn Wars broke out while the Dutch East India Company established increasing levels of control over the Mataram Sultanate.

In Africa, the Ethiopian Empire underwent the Zemene Mesafint, a period when the country was ruled by a class of regional noblemen and the emperor was merely a figurehead. The Atlantic slave trade also saw the continued involvement of states such as the Oyo Empire. In Oceania, the European colonization of Australia and New Zealand began during the late half of the century. In the Americas, the United States declared its independence from Great Britain. In 1776, Thomas Jefferson wrote the Declaration of Independence. In 1789, George Washington was inaugurated as the first president. Benjamin Franklin traveled to Europe where he was hailed as an inventor. Examples of his inventions include the lightning rod and bifocal glasses. Túpac Amaru II led an uprising that sought to end Spanish colonial rule in Peru.

== Events ==
=== 1701–1750 ===
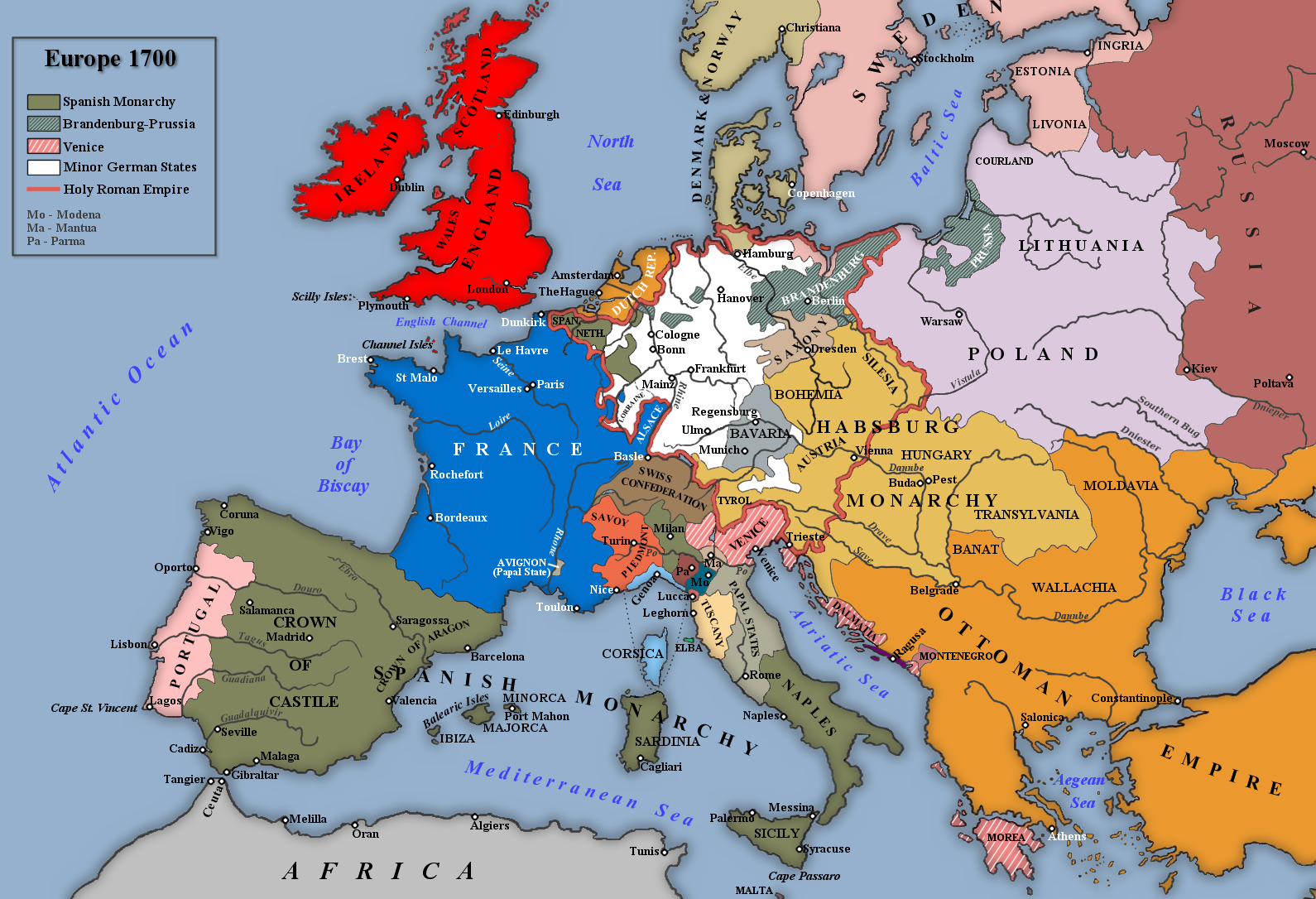
Europe at the beginning of the War of the Spanish Succession, 1700

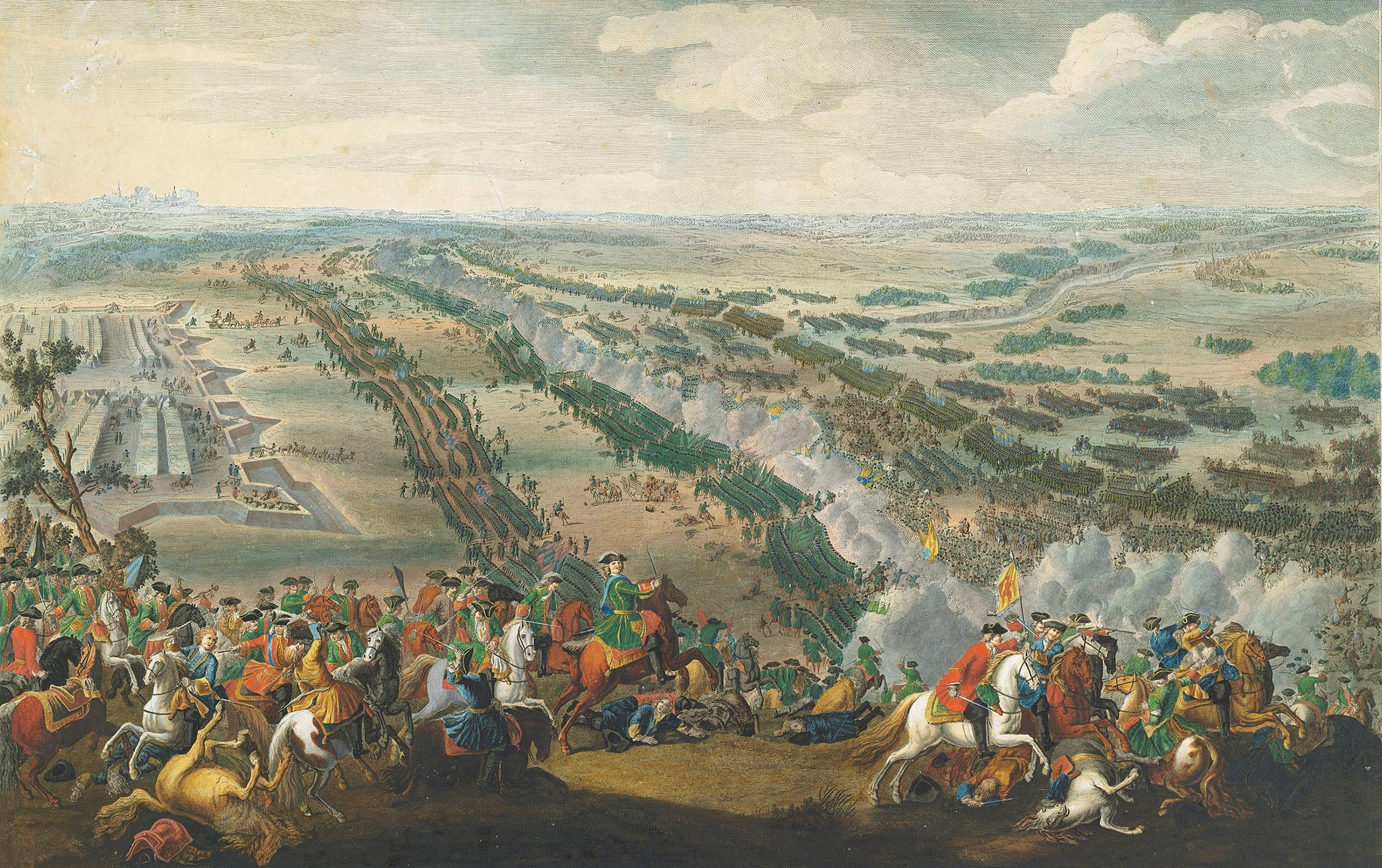
The Battle of Poltava in 1709 turned the Russian Empire into a European power.

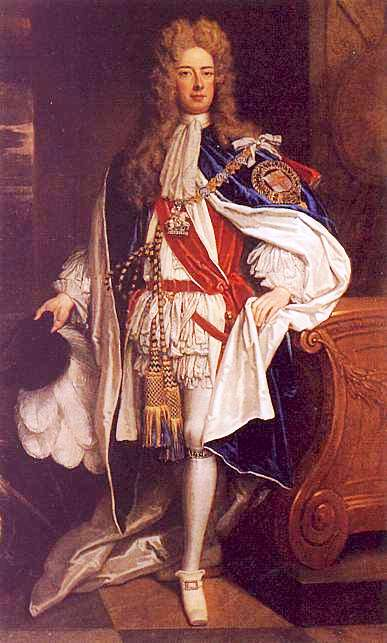
John Churchill, 1st Duke of Marlborough

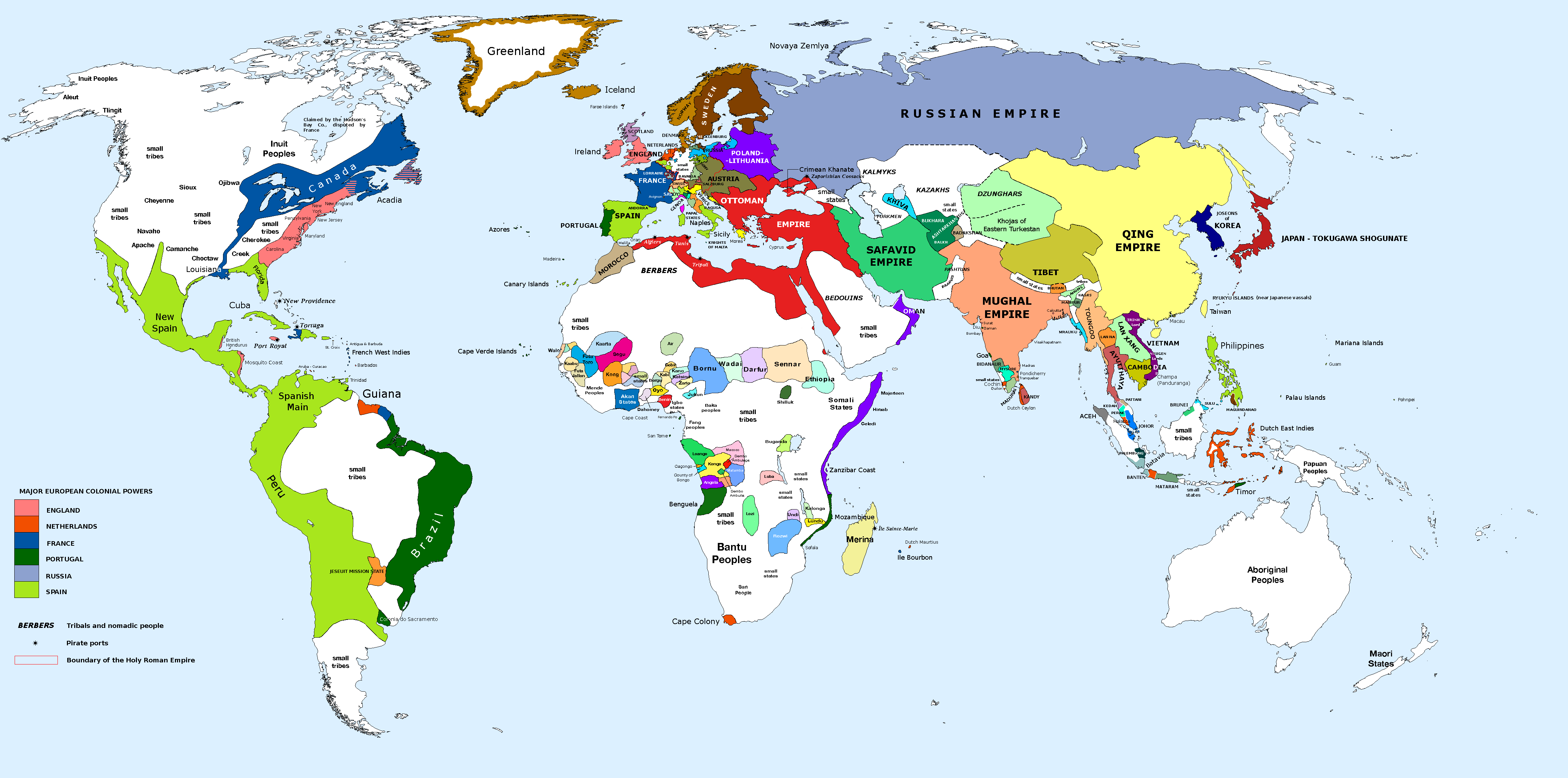
- Political boundaries at the beginning of the year 1700
  1700–1721: Great Northern War between the Russian and Swedish Empires.
- 1701: Kingdom of Prussia declared under King Frederick I.
- 1701: The Battle of Feyiase marks the rise of the Ashanti Empire.
- 1701–1714: The War of the Spanish Succession is fought, involving most of continental Europe.
- 1702–1715: Camisard rebellion in France.
- 1703: Saint Petersburg is founded by Peter the Great; it is the Russian capital until 1918.
- 1703–1711: The Rákóczi uprising against the Habsburg monarchy.
- 1704: End of Japan's Genroku period.
- 1704: First Javanese War of Succession.
- 1706–1713: The War of the Spanish Succession: French troops defeated at the Battle of Ramillies and the Siege of Turin.
- 1707: Death of Mughal Emperor Aurangzeb leads to the fragmentation of the Mughal Empire.
- 1707: The Act of Union is passed, merging the Scottish and English Parliaments, thus establishing the Kingdom of Great Britain.
- 1707: Yesubai & Shahu the Wife and Son of Chhatrapati Sambhaji were released from Mughal Custody
- 1708: Shahu was Crowned the 5th and the last hereditary Chhatrapati of Maratha empire. After a power struggle between him and the regent Tarabai
- 1708: The Company of Merchants of London Trading into the East Indies and English Company Trading to the East Indies merge to form the United Company of Merchants of England Trading to the East Indies.
- 1708–1709: Famine kills one-third of East Prussia's population.
- 1709: Foundation of the Hotak Empire.
- 1709: The Great Frost of 1709 marks the coldest winter in 500 years, contributing to the defeat of Sweden at Poltava.
- 1710: The world's first copyright legislation, Britain's Statute of Anne, takes effect.
- 1710–1711: Ottoman Empire fights Russia in the Russo-Turkish War and regains Azov.
- 1711: Bukhara Khanate dissolves as local begs seize power.
- 1711–1715: Tuscarora War between British, Dutch, and German settlers and the Tuscarora people of North Carolina.
- 1713: The Kangxi Emperor acknowledges the full recovery of the Chinese economy since its apex during the Ming.
- 1714: In Amsterdam, Daniel Gabriel Fahrenheit invents the mercury-in-glass thermometer, which remains the most reliable and accurate thermometer until the electronic era.
- 1715: The first Jacobite rising breaks out; the British halt the Jacobite advance at the Battle of Sheriffmuir; Battle of Preston.
- 1716: Establishment of the Sikh Confederacy along the present-day India-Pakistan border.
- 1716–1718: Austro-Venetian-Turkish War.
- 1718: The city of New Orleans is founded by the French in North America.
- 1718–1720: War of the Quadruple Alliance with Spain versus France, Britain, Austria, and the Netherlands.
- 1718–1730: Tulip period of the Ottoman Empire.
- 1719: Second Javanese War of Succession.
- 1720: The South Sea Bubble.
- 1720–1721: The Great Plague of Marseille.
- 1720: Qing forces oust Dzungar invaders from Tibet.
- 1721: The Treaty of Nystad is signed, ending the Great Northern War.
- 1721: Sack of Shamakhi, massacre of its Shia population by Sunni Lezgins.
- 1722: Siege of Isfahan results in the handover of Iran to the Hotaki Afghans.
- 1722–1723: Russo-Persian War.
- 1722–1725: Controversy over William Wood's halfpence leads to the Drapier's Letters and begins the Irish economic independence from England movement.

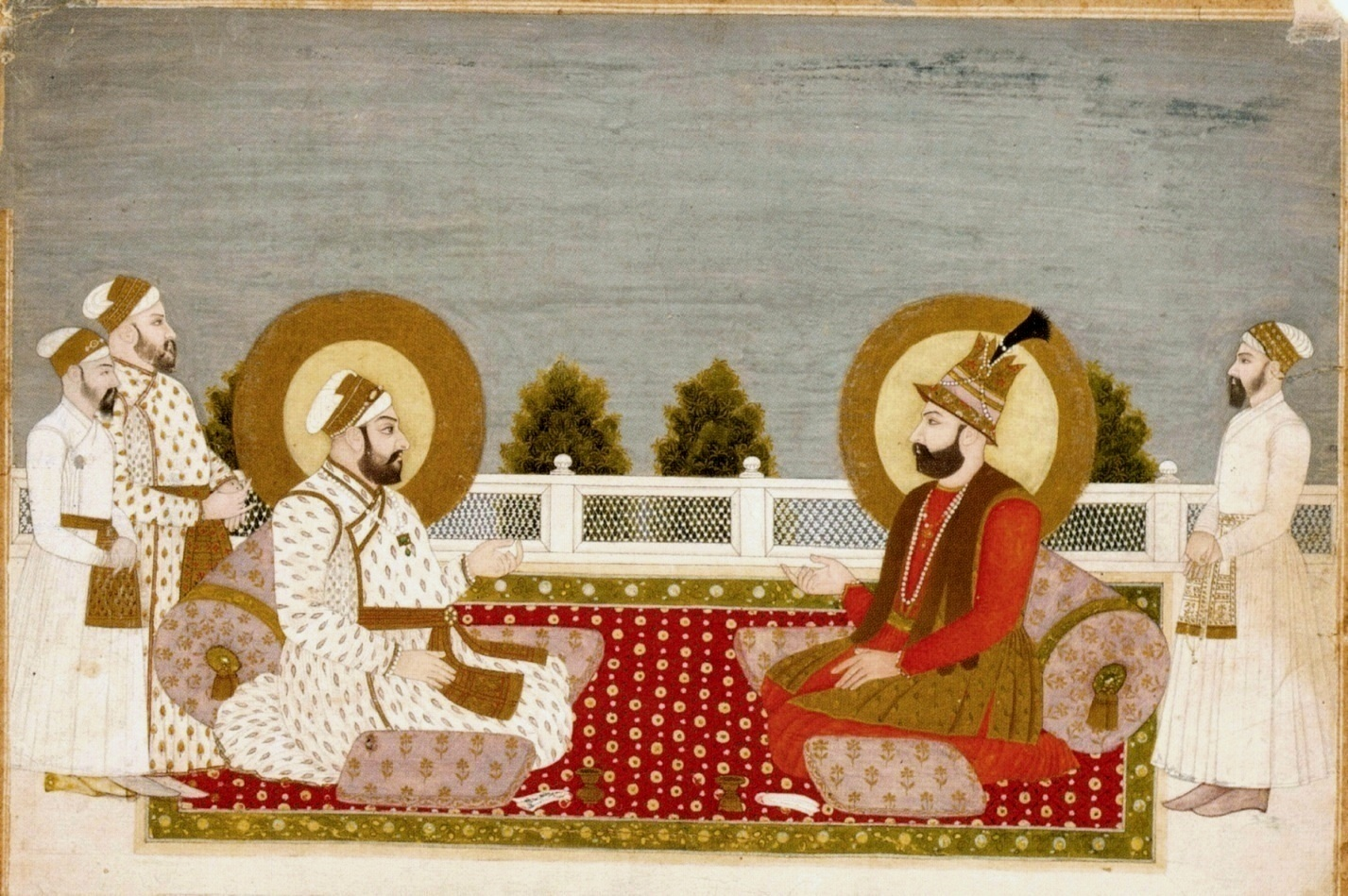
Mughal emperor Muhammad Shah with the Persian invader Nader Shah.

- 1723: Slavery is abolished in Russia; Peter the Great converts household slaves into house serfs.
- 1723–1730: The "Great Disaster", an invasion of Kazakh territories by the Dzungars.
- 1723–1732: The Qing and the Dzungars fight a series of wars across Qinghai, Dzungaria, and Outer Mongolia, with inconclusive results.
- 1724: Daniel Gabriel Fahrenheit proposes the Fahrenheit temperature scale.
- 1725: Austro-Spanish alliance revived. Russia joins in 1726.
- 1727–1729: Anglo-Spanish War ends inconclusively.
- 1730: Mahmud I takes over Ottoman Empire after the Patrona Halil revolt, ending the Tulip period.
- 1730–1760: The First Great Awakening takes place in Great Britain and North America.
- 1732–1734: Crimean Tatar raids into Russia.
- 1733–1738: War of the Polish Succession.

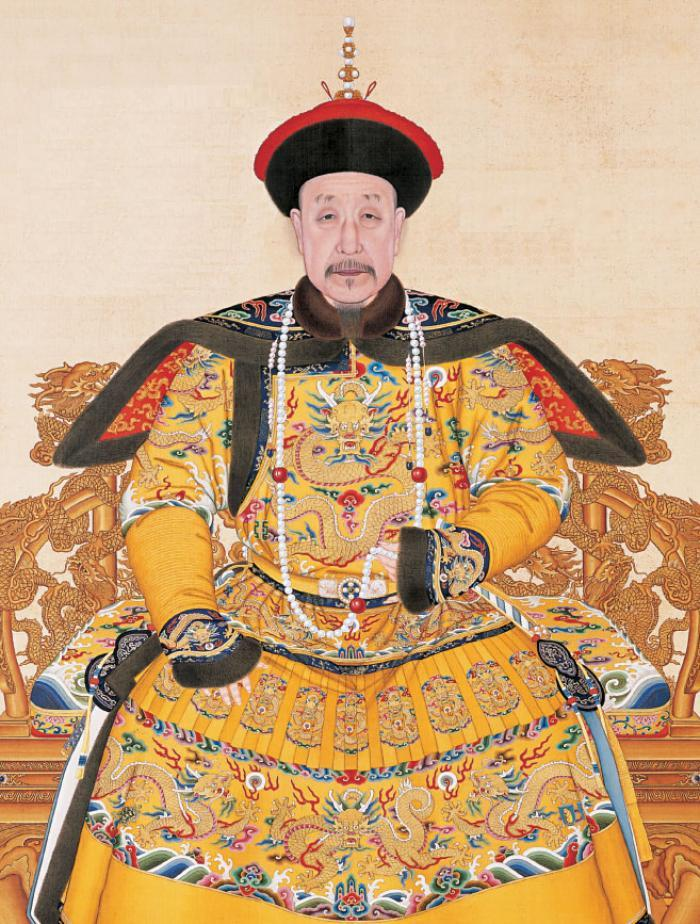
Qianlong Emperor

- 1735–1739: Austro-Russo-Turkish War.
- 1735–1799: The Qianlong Emperor of China oversees a huge expansion in territory.
- 1738–1756: Famine across the Sahel; half the population of Timbuktu dies.
- 1737–1738: Hotak Empire ends after the siege of Kandahar by Nader Shah.
- 1739: Great Britain and Spain fight the War of Jenkins' Ear in the Caribbean.
- 1739: Nader Shah defeats a pan-Indian army of 300,000 at the Battle of Karnal. Taxation is stopped in Iran for three years.
- 1739–1740: Nader Shah's Sindh expedition.
- 1740: George Whitefield brings the First Great Awakening to New England
- 1740–1741: Famine in Ireland kills 20 percent of the population.
- 1741–1743: Iran invades Uzbekistan, Khwarazm, Dagestan, and Oman.
- 1741–1751: Maratha invasions of Bengal.
- 1740–1748: War of the Austrian Succession.
- 1742: Marvel's Mill, the first water-powered cotton mill, begins operation in England.
- 1742: Anders Celsius proposes an inverted form of the centigrade temperature, which is later renamed Celsius in his honor.
- 1742: Premiere of George Frideric Handel's Messiah.
- 1743–1746: Another Ottoman-Persian War involves 375,000 men but ultimately ends in a stalemate.

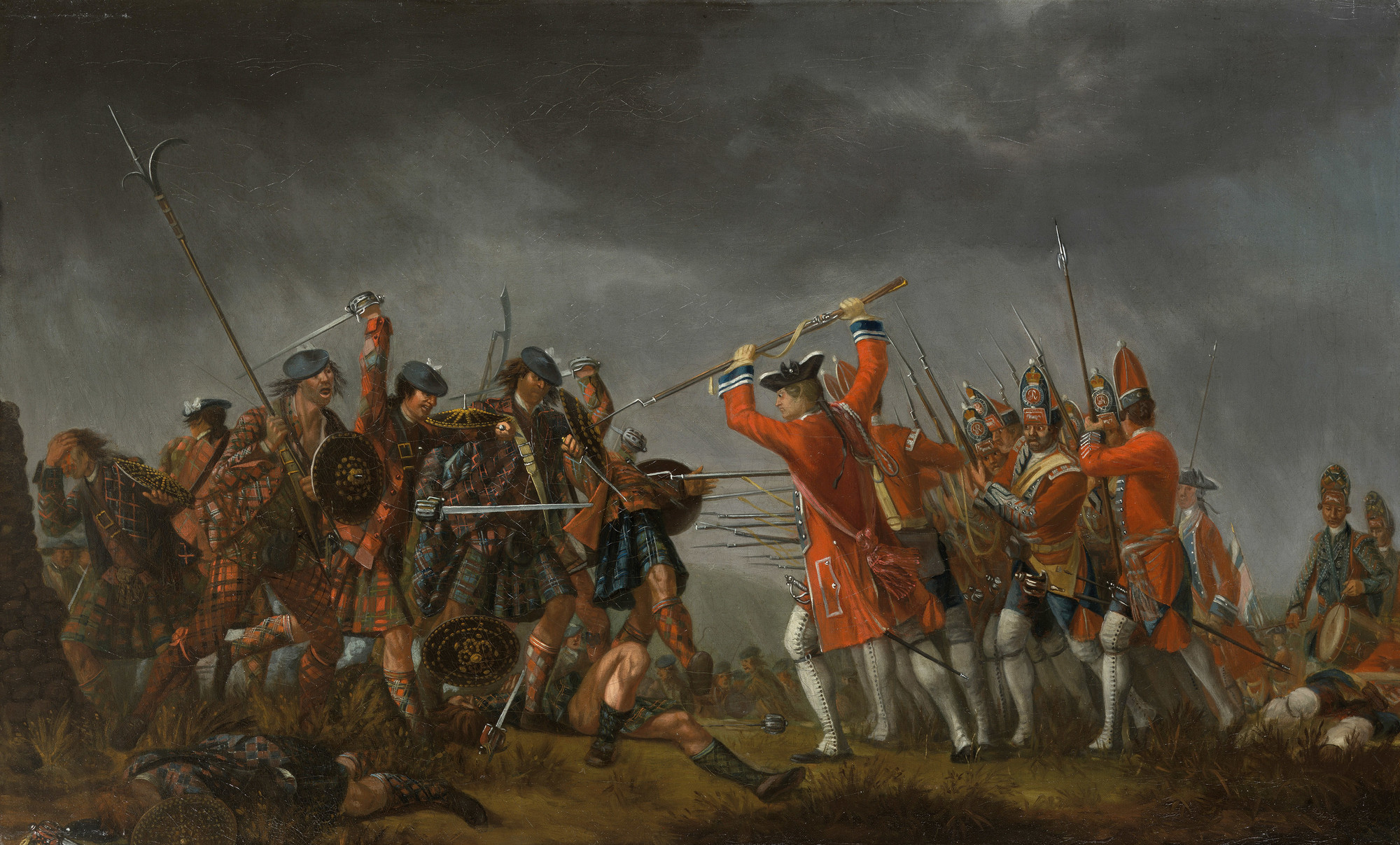
The extinction of the Scottish clan system came with the defeat of the clansmen at the Battle of Culloden in 1746.

- 1744: The First Saudi State is founded by Mohammed Ibn Saud.
- 1744: Battle of Toulon is fought off the coast of France.
- 1744–1748: The First Carnatic War is fought between the British, the French, the Marathas, and Mysore in India.
- 1745: Second Jacobite rising is begun by Charles Edward Stuart in Scotland.
- 1747: The Durrani Empire is founded by Ahmad Shah Durrani.
- 1748: The Treaty of Aix-La-Chapelle ends the War of the Austrian Succession and First Carnatic War.
- 1748–1754: The Second Carnatic War is fought between the British, the French, the Marathas, and Mysore in India.
- 1749: The death of Chhatrapati Shahu leads to the peshwa's taking power over the Maratha throne.
- 1750: Peak of the Little Ice Age.

=== 1751–1800 ===
- 1752: The British Empire adopts the Gregorian Calendar, skipping 11 days from 3 September to 13 September. On the calendar, 2 September is followed directly by 14 September.
- 1754: The Treaty of Pondicherry ends the Second Carnatic War and recognizes Muhammed Ali Khan Wallajah as Nawab of the Carnatic.
- 1754: King's College is founded by a royal charter of George II of Great Britain.
- 1754–1763: The French and Indian War, the North American chapter of the Seven Years' War, is fought in colonial North America, mostly by the French and their allies against the English and their allies.
- 1755: The great Lisbon earthquake destroys most of Portugal's capital and kills up to 100,000.
- 1755: The Dzungar genocide depopulates much of northern Xinjiang, allowing for Han, Uyghur, Khalkha Mongol, and Manchu colonization.
- 1755–1763: The Great Upheaval forces transfer of the French Acadian population from Nova Scotia and New Brunswick.
- 1756–1763: The Seven Years' War is fought among European powers in various theaters around the world.
- 1756–1763: The Third Carnatic War is fought between the British, the French, and Mysore in India.
- 1757: British conquest of Bengal.

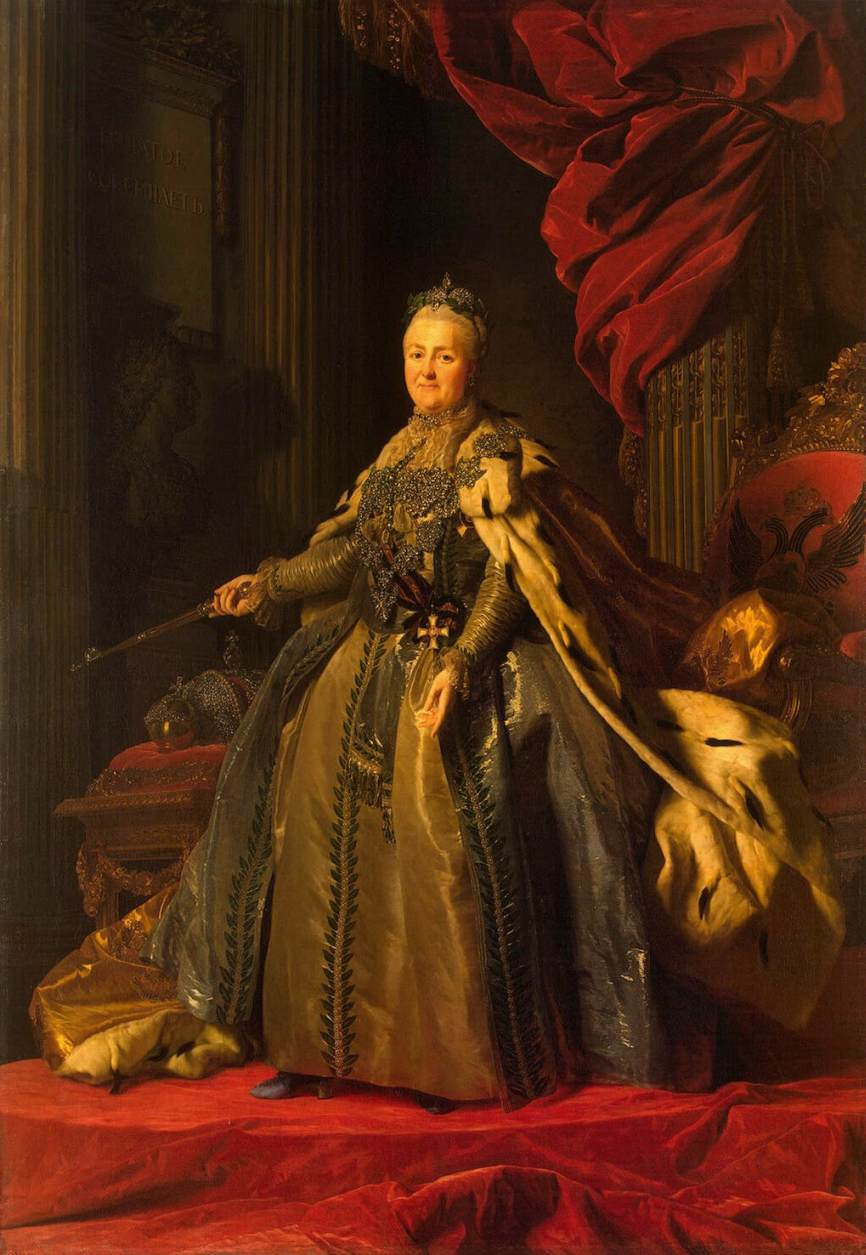
Catherine the Great, Empress of Russia.

- 1760: George III becomes King of Britain.
- 1761: Maratha Empire defeated at Battle of Panipat.
- 1762–1796: Reign of Catherine the Great of Russia.
- 1763: The Treaty of Paris ends the Seven Years' War and Third Carnatic War.
- 1764: Dahomey and the Oyo Empire defeat the Ashanti army at the Battle of Atakpamé.
- 1764: The Mughals are defeated at the Battle of Buxar.
- 1765: The Stamp Act is introduced into the American colonies by the British Parliament.
- 1765–1767: The Burmese invade Thailand and utterly destroy Attuthaya.
- 1765–1769: Burma under Hsinbyushin repels four invasions from Qing China, securing hegemony over the Shan states.
- 1766: Christian VII becomes king of Denmark. He was king of Denmark to 1808.
- 1766–1799: Anglo-Mysore Wars.
- 1767: Taksin expels Burmese invaders and reunites Thailand under an authoritarian regime.
- 1768–1772: War of the Bar Confederation.
- 1768–1774: Russo-Turkish War.
- 1769: Spanish missionaries establish the first of 21 missions in California.
- 1769–1770: James Cook explores and maps New Zealand and Australia.
- 1769–1773: The Bengal famine of 1770 kills one-third of the Bengal population.
- 1769: The French East India Company dissolves, only to be revived in 1785.
- 1769: French expeditions capture clove plants in Ambon, ending the Dutch East India Company's (VOC) monopoly of the plant.
- 1769: Egypt breaks away from the Ottoman Empire and gains short-term independence, and Ali Bey al-Kabir declared the de facto ruler.
- 1770: Egyptians forces defeat the Ottoman Army in Campaigns in the Hejaz (1770).
- 1770–1771: Famine in Czech lands kills hundreds of thousands.
- 1771: The Plague Riot in Moscow.
- 1771: The Kalmyk Khanate dissolves as the territory becomes colonized by Russians. More than a hundred thousand Kalmyks migrate back to Qing Dzungaria.
- 1772: Gustav III of Sweden stages a coup d'état, becoming almost an absolute monarch.

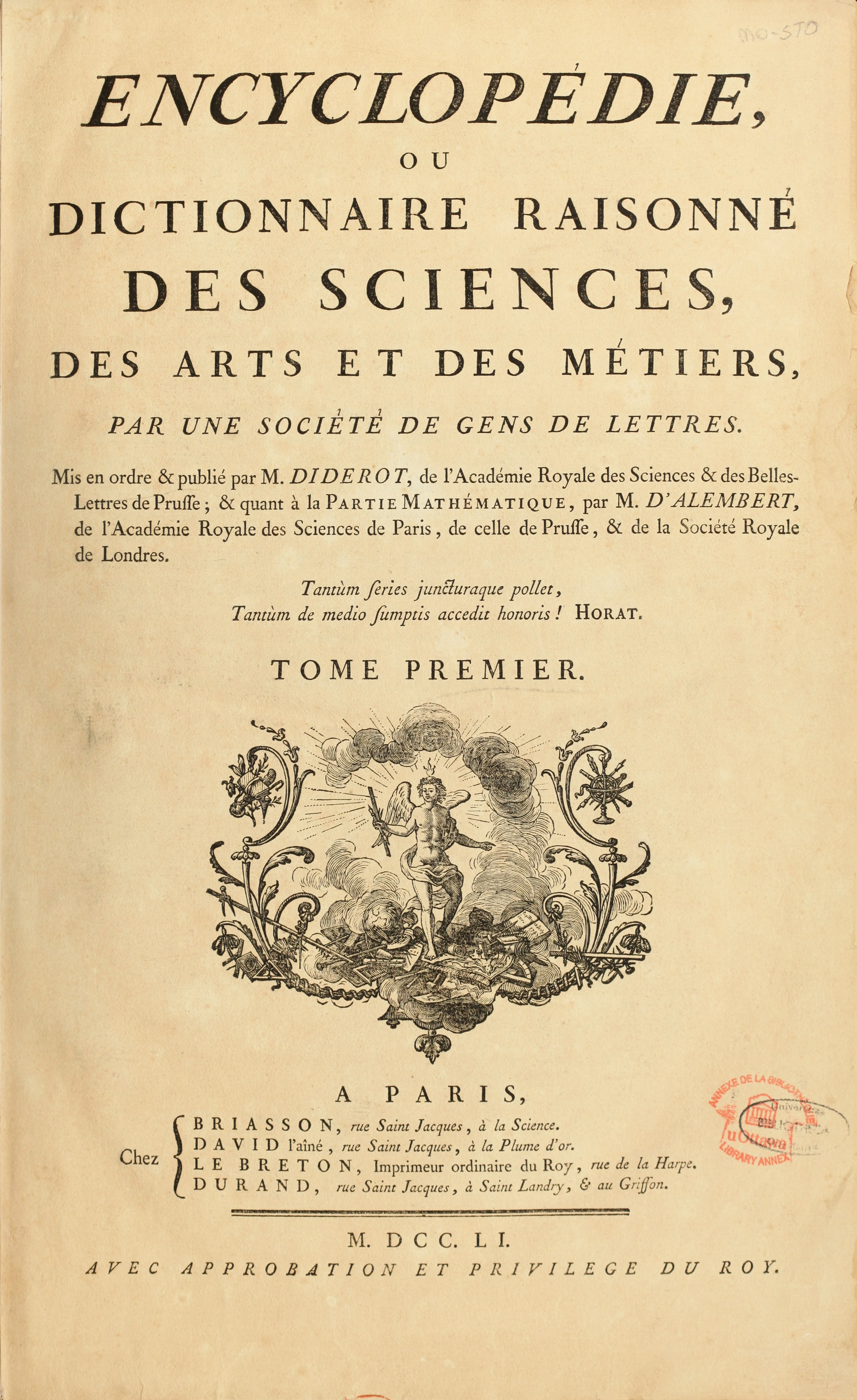
Encyclopédie, ou dictionnaire raisonné des sciences, des arts et des métiers

- 1772–1779: Maratha Empire fights Britain and Raghunathrao's forces during the First Anglo-Maratha War.
- 1772–1795: The Partitions of Poland end the Polish–Lithuanian Commonwealth and erase Poland from the map for 123 years.
- 1773–1775: Pugachev's Rebellion, the largest peasant revolt in Russian history.
- 1773: East India Company starts operations in Bengal to smuggle opium into China.
- 1775: Russia imposes a reduction in autonomy on the Zaporizhian Cossacks of Ukraine.
- 1775–1782: First Anglo-Maratha War.
- 1775–1783: American Revolutionary War.
- 1776: Several kongsi republics are founded by Chinese settlers in the island of Borneo. They are some of the first democracies in Asia.
- 1776–1777: A Spanish-Portuguese War occurs over land in the South American frontiers.
- 1776: Illuminati founded by Adam Weishaupt.
- 1776: The United States Declaration of Independence is adopted by the Second Continental Congress in Philadelphia.
- 1776: Adam Smith publishes The Wealth of Nations.
- 1778: James Cook becomes the first European to land on the Hawaiian Islands.
- 1778: Franco-American alliance signed.
- 1778: Spain acquires its first permanent holding in Africa from the Portuguese, which is administered by the newly-established La Plata Viceroyalty.
- 1778: Vietnam is reunified for the first time in 200 years by the Tay Son brothers. The Tây Sơn dynasty has been established, terminating the Lê dynasty.
- 1779–1879: Xhosa Wars between British and Boer settlers and the Xhosas in the South African Republic.
- 1779–1783: Britain loses several islands and colonial outposts all over the world to the combined Franco-Spanish navy.
- 1779: Iran enters yet another period of conflict and civil war after the prosperous reign of Karim Khan Zand.
- 1780: Outbreak of the indigenous rebellion against Spanish colonization led by Túpac Amaru II in Peru.
- 1781: The city of Los Angeles is founded by Spanish settlers.
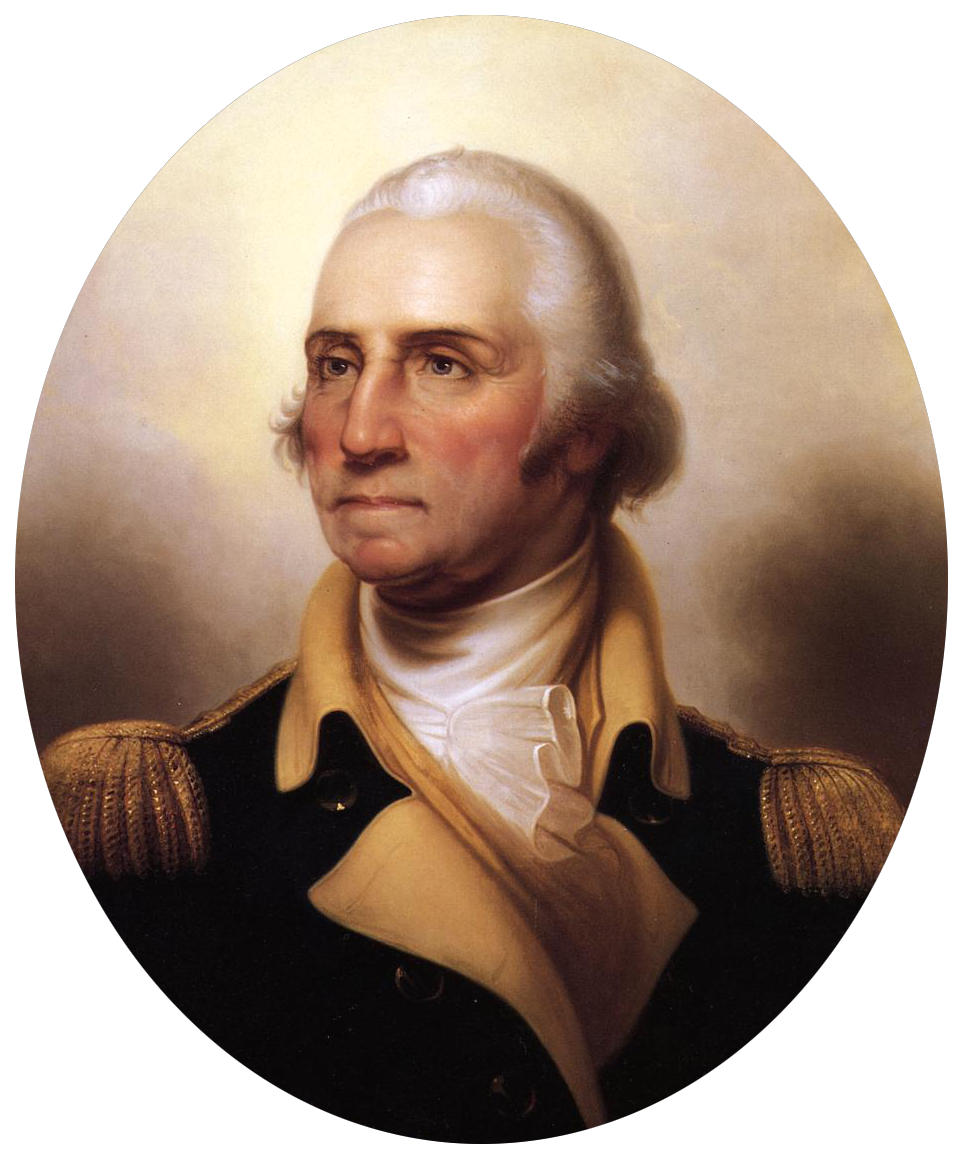
  George Washington
- 1781–1785: Serfdom is abolished in the Austrian monarchy (first step; second step in 1848).
- 1782: The Thonburi Kingdom of Thailand is dissolved after a palace coup.
- 1783: The Treaty of Paris formally ends the American Revolutionary War.
- 1783: Russian annexation of Crimea.
- 1785–1791: Imam Sheikh Mansur, a Chechen warrior and Muslim mystic, leads a coalition of Muslim Caucasian tribes from throughout the Caucasus in a holy war against Russian settlers and military bases in the Caucasus, as well as against local traditionalists, who followed the traditional customs and common law (Adat) rather than the theocratic Sharia.
- 1785–1795: The Northwest Indian War is fought between the United States and Native Americans.
- 1785–1787: The Maratha–Mysore Wars concludes with an exchange of territories in the Deccan.
- 1786–1787: Wolfgang Amadeus Mozart premieres The Marriage of Figaro and Don Giovanni.
- 1787: The Tuareg occupy Timbuktu until the 19th century.
- 1787–1792: Russo-Turkish War.
- 1788: First Fleet arrives in Australia
- 1788–1790: Russo-Swedish War (1788–1790).
- 1788: Dutch Geert Adriaans Boomgaard (1788–1899) would become the first generally accepted validated case of a supercentenarian on record.

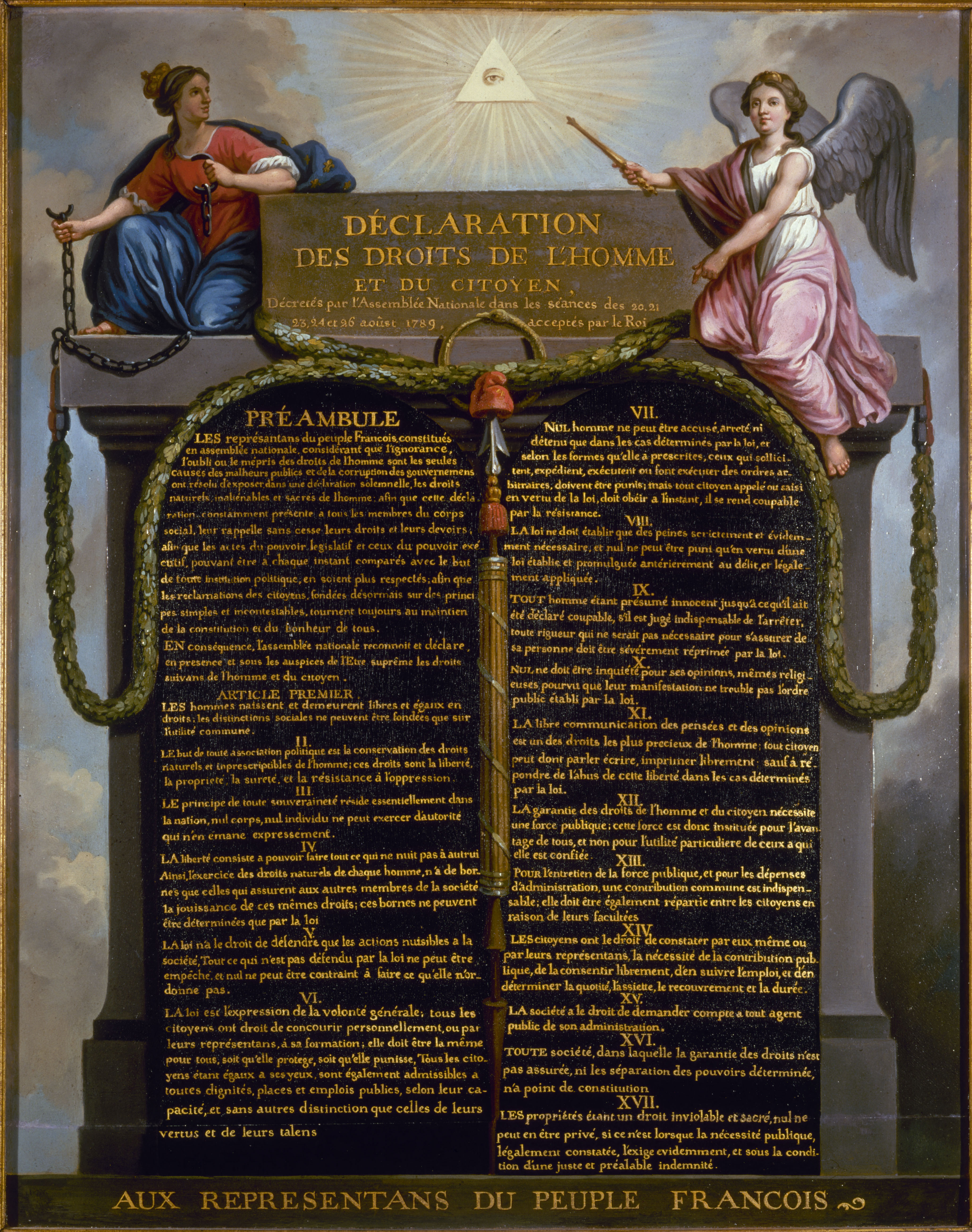
Declaration of the Rights of Man and of the Citizen

- 1788–1789: A Qing attempt to reinstall an exiled Vietnamese king in northern Vietnam ends in disaster.
- 1788-1789: George Washington is elected the first President of the United States; he serves until from 1789 to 1797.
- 1789: Quang Trung defeats the Qing army.
- Storming of the Bastille, 14 July, 1789. It was an important event in the French Revolution
  1789–1799: French Revolution.
- 1789: The Liège Revolution.
- 1789: The Qajar Iran
- 1789: The Brabant Revolution.
- 1789: The Inconfidência Mineira, an unsuccessful separatist movement in central Brazil led by Tiradentes
- 1791: Suppression of the Liège Revolution by Austrian forces and re-establishment of the Prince-Bishopric of Liège.
- 1791–1795: George Vancouver explores the world during the Vancouver Expedition.
- 1791–1804: The Haitian Revolution.
- 1791: Mozart premieres The Magic Flute.
- 1792–1802: The French Revolutionary Wars lead into the Napoleonic Wars, which last from 1803–1815.
- 1792: The New York Stock & Exchange Board is founded.
- 1792: Polish–Russian War of 1792.
- 1792: Margaret Ann Neve (1792–1903) would become the first recorded female supercentenarian to reach the age of 110.
- 1793: Upper Canada bans slavery.
- 1793: The largest yellow fever epidemic in American history kills as many as 5,000 people in Philadelphia, roughly 10% of the population.
- 1793–1796: Revolt in the Vendée against the French Republic at the time of the Revolution.
- 1794–1816: The Hawkesbury and Nepean Wars, which were a series of incidents between settlers and New South Wales Corps and the Aboriginal Australian clans of the Hawkesbury river in Sydney, Australia.
- 1795: The Marseillaise is officially adopted as the French national anthem.
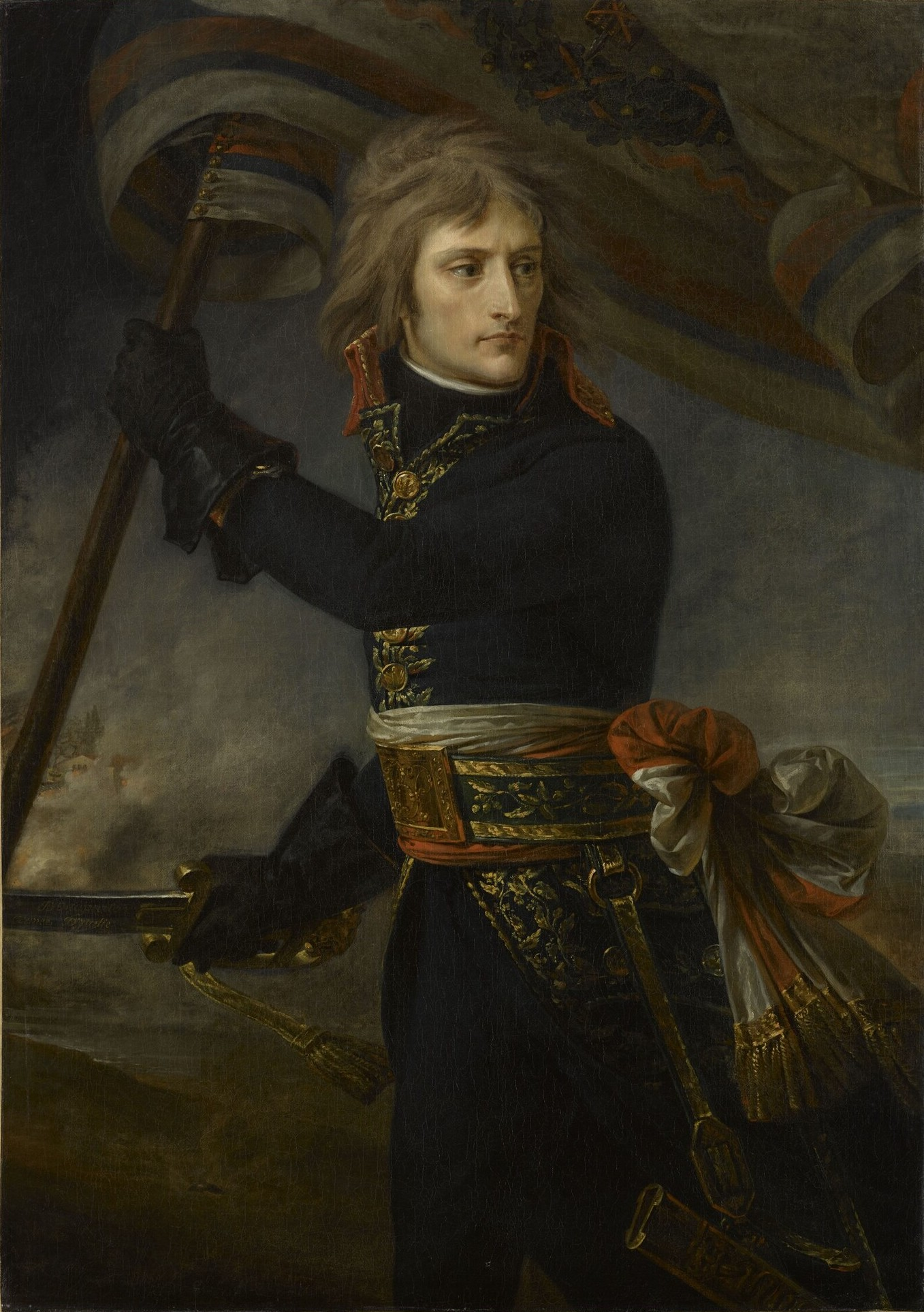
  Napoleon at the Bridge of the Arcole
- 1795: The Battle of Nuʻuanu in the final days of King Kamehameha I's wars to unify the Hawaiian Islands.
- 1795–1796: Iran invades and devastates Georgia, prompting Russia to intervene and march on Tehran.
- 1796: Edward Jenner administers the first smallpox vaccination; smallpox killed an estimated 400,000 Europeans each year during the 18th century, including five reigning monarchs.
- 1796: War of the First Coalition: The Battle of Montenotte marks Napoleon Bonaparte's first victory as an army commander.
- 1796: The British eject the Dutch from Ceylon and South Africa.
- 1796: John Adams is elected the second President of the United States; he serves until from 1797 to 1801.
- 1796–1804: The White Lotus Rebellion against the Manchu dynasty in China.
- 1798: The Irish Rebellion fails to overthrow British rule in Ireland.
- 1798–1800: The Quasi-War is fought between the United States and France.
- 1799: Dutch East India Company is dissolved.
- 1799: Austro-Russian forces under Alexander Suvorov liberates much of Italy and Switzerland from French occupation.
- 1799: Coup of 18 Brumaire - Napoleon's coup d'etat brings the end of the French Revolution.
- 1799: Death of the Qianlong Emperor after 60 years of rule over China. His favorite official, Heshen, is ordered to commit suicide.
- 1800: On 1 January, the bankrupt VOC is formally dissolved and the nationalized Dutch East Indies are established.

== Inventions, discoveries, and introductions ==
The spinning jenny

- 1709: The first piano was built by Bartolomeo Cristofori
- 1711: Tuning fork was invented by John Shore
- 1712: Steam engine invented by Thomas Newcomen
- 1714: Mercury thermometer by Daniel Gabriel Fahrenheit
- 1717: Diving bell was successfully tested by Edmond Halley, sustainable to a depth of 55 ft
- c. 1730: Octant navigational tool was developed by John Hadley in England, and Thomas Godfrey in America
- 1733: Flying shuttle invented by John Kay
- 1736: Europeans encountered rubber – the discovery was made by Charles Marie de La Condamine while on expedition in South America. It was named in 1770 by Joseph Priestley
- c. 1740: Modern steel was developed by Benjamin Huntsman
- 1741: Vitus Bering discovers Alaska
- 1745: Leyden jar invented by Ewald Georg von Kleist was the first electrical capacitor
- 1751: Jacques de Vaucanson perfects the first precision lathe
- 1752: Lightning rod invented by Benjamin Franklin
- 1753: The first clock to be built in the New World (North America) was invented by Benjamin Banneker.
- 1755: The tallest wooden Bodhisattva statue in the world is erected at Puning Temple, Chengde, China.
- 1764: Spinning jenny created by James Hargreaves brought on the Industrial Revolution
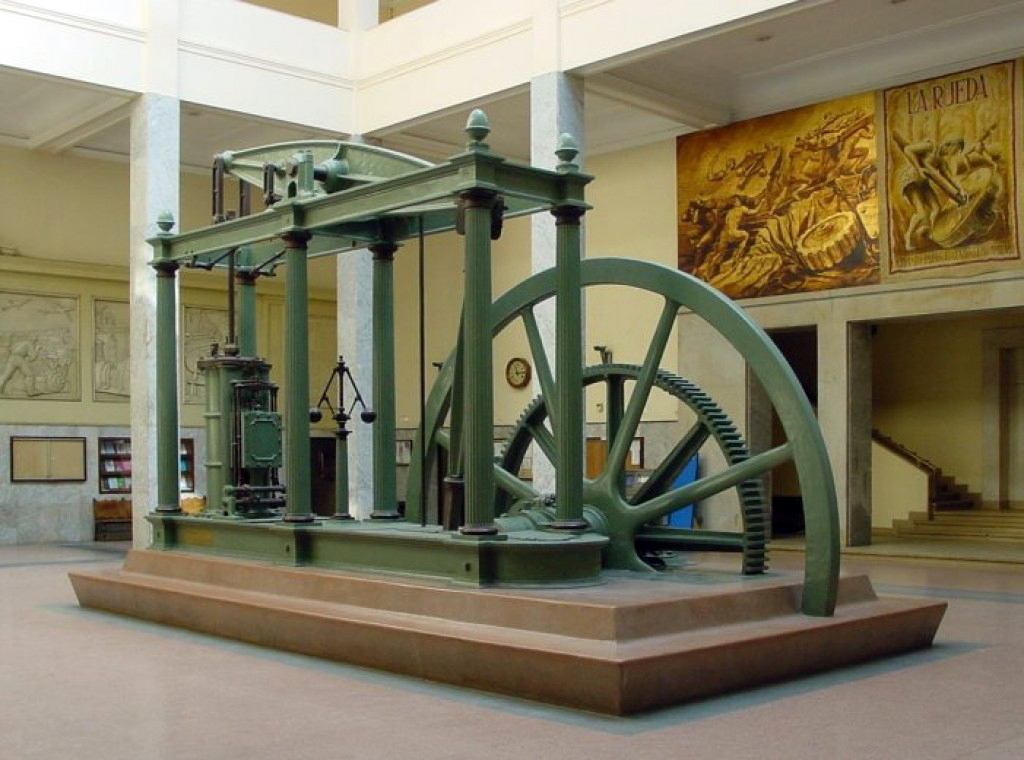
- The Watt steam engine and steam power played an important role in the early Industrial Revolution
  1765: James Watt enhances Newcomen's steam engine, allowing new steel technologies
- 1761: The problem of longitude was finally resolved by the fourth chronometer of John Harrison
- 1763: Thomas Bayes publishes first version of Bayes' theorem, paving the way for Bayesian probability
- 1768–1779: James Cook mapped the boundaries of the Pacific Ocean and discovered many Pacific Islands
- 1774: Joseph Priestley discovers "dephlogisticated air", oxygen

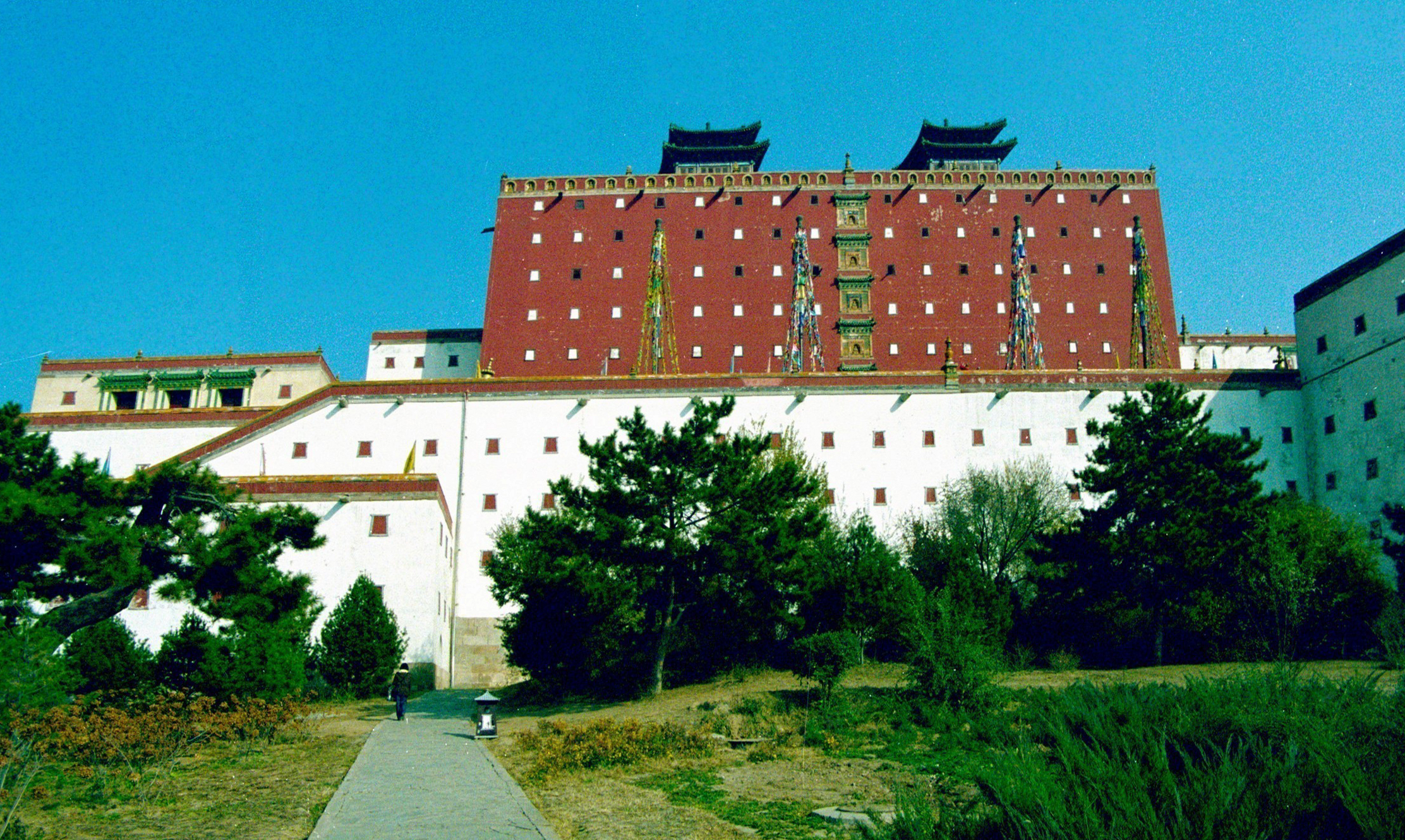
The Chinese Putuo Zongcheng Temple of Chengde, completed in 1771, during the reign of the Qianlong Emperor.

- 1775: Joseph Priestley's first synthesis of "phlogisticated nitrous air", nitrous oxide, "laughing gas"
- 1776: First improved steam engines installed by James Watt
- 1776: Steamboat invented by Claude de Jouffroy
- 1777: Circular saw invented by Samuel Miller
- 1779: Photosynthesis was first discovered by Jan Ingenhousz
- 1781: William Herschel announces discovery of Uranus
- 1784: Bifocals invented by Benjamin Franklin
- 1784: Argand lamp invented by Aimé Argand
- 1785: Power loom invented by Edmund Cartwright
- 1785: Automatic flour mill invented by Oliver Evans
- 1786: Threshing machine invented by Andrew Meikle
- 1787: Jacques Charles discovers Charles's law
- 1789: Antoine Lavoisier discovers the law of conservation of mass, the basis for chemistry, and begins modern chemistry
- 1798: Edward Jenner publishes a treatise about smallpox vaccination
- 1798: The Lithographic printing process invented by Alois Senefelder
- 1799: Rosetta Stone discovered by Napoleon's troops

== Literary and philosophical achievements ==
- 1703: The Love Suicides at Sonezaki by Chikamatsu first performed
- 1704–1717: One Thousand and One Nights translated into French by Antoine Galland. The work becomes immensely popular throughout Europe.
- 1704: A Tale of a Tub by Jonathan Swift first published
- 1712: The Rape of the Lock by Alexander Pope (publication of first version)
- 1719: Robinson Crusoe by Daniel Defoe
- 1725: The New Science by Giambattista Vico
- 1726: Gulliver's Travels by Jonathan Swift
- 1728: The Dunciad by Alexander Pope (publication of first version)
- 1744: A Little Pretty Pocket-Book becomes one of the first books marketed for children
- 1748: Chushingura (The Treasury of Loyal Retainers), popular Japanese puppet play, composed
- 1748: Clarissa; or, The History of a Young Lady by Samuel Richardson
- 1749: The History of Tom Jones, a Foundling by Henry Fielding
- 1751: Elegy Written in a Country Churchyard by Thomas Gray published
- 1751–1785: The French Encyclopédie
- 1755: A Dictionary of the English Language by Samuel Johnson
- 1758: Arithmetika Horvatzka by Mihalj Šilobod Bolšić
- 1759: Candide by Voltaire
- 1759: The Theory of Moral Sentiments by Adam Smith
- 1759–1767: Tristram Shandy by Laurence Sterne
- 1762: Emile: or, On Education by Jean-Jacques Rousseau
- 1762: The Social Contract, Or Principles of Political Right by Jean-Jacques Rousseau
- 1774: The Sorrows of Young Werther by Goethe first published
- 1776: Ugetsu Monogatari (Tales of Moonlight and Rain) by Ueda Akinari
- 1776: The Wealth of Nations, foundation of the modern theory of economy, was published by Adam Smith
- 1776–1789: The History of the Decline and Fall of the Roman Empire was published by Edward Gibbon
- 1779: Amazing Grace published by John Newton
- 1779–1782: Lives of the Most Eminent English Poets by Samuel Johnson
- 1781: Critique of Pure Reason by Immanuel Kant (publication of first edition)
- 1781: The Robbers by Friedrich Schiller first published
- 1782: Les Liaisons dangereuses by Pierre Choderlos de Laclos
- 1786: Poems, Chiefly in the Scottish Dialect by Robert Burns
- 1787–1788: The Federalist Papers by Alexander Hamilton, James Madison, and John Jay
- 1788: Critique of Practical Reason by Immanuel Kant
- 1789: Songs of Innocence by William Blake
- 1789: The Interesting Narrative of the Life of Olaudah Equiano by Olaudah Equiano
- 1790: Journey from St. Petersburg to Moscow by Alexander Radishchev
- 1790: Reflections on the Revolution in France by Edmund Burke
- 1791: Rights of Man by Thomas Paine
- 1792: A Vindication of the Rights of Woman by Mary Wollstonecraft
- 1794: Songs of Experience by William Blake
- 1798: Lyrical Ballads by William Wordsworth and Samuel Taylor Coleridge
- 1798: An Essay on the Principle of Population published by Thomas Malthus
- (mid–18th century): The Dream of the Red Chamber (authorship attributed to Cao Xueqin), one of the most famous Chinese novels

== Musical works ==
- 1711: Rinaldo, Handel's first opera for the London stage, premiered
- 1721: Brandenburg Concertos by J.S. Bach
- 1723: The Four Seasons, violin concertos by Antonio Vivaldi, composed
- 1724: St John Passion by J.S. Bach
- 1727: St Matthew Passion composed by J.S. Bach
- 1727: Zadok the Priest is composed by Handel for the coronation of George II of Great Britain. It has been performed at every subsequent British coronation.
- 1733: Hippolyte et Aricie, first opera by Jean-Philippe Rameau
- 1741: Goldberg Variations for harpsichord published by Bach
- 1742: Messiah, oratorio by Handel premiered in Dublin
- 1749: Mass in B minor by J.S. Bach assembled in current form
- 1751: The Art of Fugue by J.S. Bach
- 1762: Orfeo ed Euridice, first "reform opera" by Gluck, performed in Vienna
- 1786: The Marriage of Figaro, opera by Mozart
- 1787: Don Giovanni, opera by Mozart
- 1788: Jupiter Symphony (Symphony No. 41) composed by Mozart
- 1791: The Magic Flute, opera by Mozart
- 1791–1795: London symphonies by Haydn
- 1798: The Pathétique, piano sonata by Ludwig van Beethoven
- 1798: The Creation, oratorio by Joseph Haydn first performed

== See also ==
- The Wallace Collection, London, houses one of the finest collections of 18th-century decorative arts from France, England and Italy, including paintings, furniture, porcelain and gold boxes.
