= Birmingham Journal =

The Birmingham Journal was the name of two separate and unrelated newspapers published in Birmingham, England:

- The Birmingham Journal (eighteenth century), published between 1732 and 1741, the first newspaper known to have been published in Birmingham
- The Birmingham Journal (nineteenth century), published between 1825 and 1869, a direct ancestor of today's Birmingham Post
