= 1741 in Wales =

- Centuries: 16th; 17th; 18th; 19th; 20th
- Decades: 1720s; 1730s; 1740s; 1750s; 1760s
- See also: List of years in Wales; Timeline of Welsh history 1741 in Great Britain Scotland Elsewhere

Events from the year 1741 in Wales.

== Incumbents ==
- Lord Lieutenant of North Wales (Lord Lieutenant of Anglesey, Caernarvonshire, Flintshire, Merionethshire, Montgomeryshire) – George Cholmondeley, 3rd Earl of Cholmondeley
- Lord Lieutenant of Glamorgan – Charles Powlett, 3rd Duke of Bolton
- Lord Lieutenant of Brecknockshire and Lord Lieutenant of Monmouthshire – Thomas Morgan
- Lord Lieutenant of Cardiganshire – John Vaughan, 2nd Viscount Lisburne
- Lord Lieutenant of Carmarthenshire – vacant until 1755
- Lord Lieutenant of Denbighshire – Sir Robert Salusbury Cotton, 3rd Baronet
- Lord Lieutenant of Pembrokeshire – Sir Arthur Owen, 3rd Baronet
- Lord Lieutenant of Radnorshire – James Brydges, 1st Duke of Chandos
- Bishop of Bangor – Thomas Herring
- Bishop of Llandaff – John Gilbert
- Bishop of St Asaph – Isaac Maddox
- Bishop of St Davids – Nicholas Clagett

== Events ==
- June – In the general election, the seat of Sir Watkin Williams-Wynn, 3rd Baronet at Denbighshire is targeted by the government. Sir Watkin wins by 1352 to 933, but the sheriff, a member of the Salusbury family, disallows 594 of his votes and returns a cousin of Salusbury, John Myddelton of Chirk. Sir Watkin is elected for Montgomeryshire instead.
- Carpenter Siarl Marc is converted and quickly becomes the most important Calvinistic Methodist exhorter in the Llyn peninsula.
- Lewis Morris resumes his survey of Welsh ports on behalf of the Navy Office.

== Arts and literature ==
=== New books ===
- Evan Davies – Newyddion Mawr Oddiwrth y Ser (vol. 3)

=== Music ===
- Morgan John Lewis – Hymnau Duwiol o Gasgliad Gwyr Eglwysig M.J. ac E.W.
- David Owen composes Dafydd y Garreg Wen on his deathbed, according to tradition

== Births ==
- 27 January – Hester Thrale, diarist and friend of Dr Johnson (died 1821)
- 20 August – Henry Herbert, 1st Earl of Carnarvon (died 1811)
- 3 September – Owen Jones, antiquary (died 1814)

== Deaths ==
- May – Isaac Carter, publisher
- August – David Owen, 29 ("David of the White Rock"), harpist
- date unknown
  - Wil Hopcyn, poet, 41?
  - Edward Owen, artist
  - Robert Roberts, theologian, 61?
