= Thomas Warren =

English bookseller, printer and publisher

Thomas Warren (fl. 1727–1767) was an English bookseller, printer, publisher and businessman.

Warren was an influential figure in Birmingham at a time when it was a hotbed of creative activity, opening a bookshop in High Street, Birmingham around 1727. From here he founded and published the Birmingham Journal – the town's first known newspaper; he edited and published Samuel Johnson's first book – a translation of Jerónimo Lobo’s Voyage to Abyssinia—and with Joshua Kirton sold Francis Godwin's The Man in the Moone. Warren was also known for publishing collections of contemporary musical catches, canons, glees and rounds, more than 650 works by over 100 composers.

He also financed the cotton mill established by John Wyatt and Lewis Paul in 1741. This was the world's first mechanised cotton-spinning factory, and was to pave the way for Richard Arkwright's later transformation of the cotton industry during the Industrial Revolution.

The Paul-Wyatt cotton mill was not a financial success, however, and Warren declared bankruptcy in 1743.
