= Marvel's Mill =

Cotton mill in Northampton, England

Coordinates: 52.234°N 0.903°W

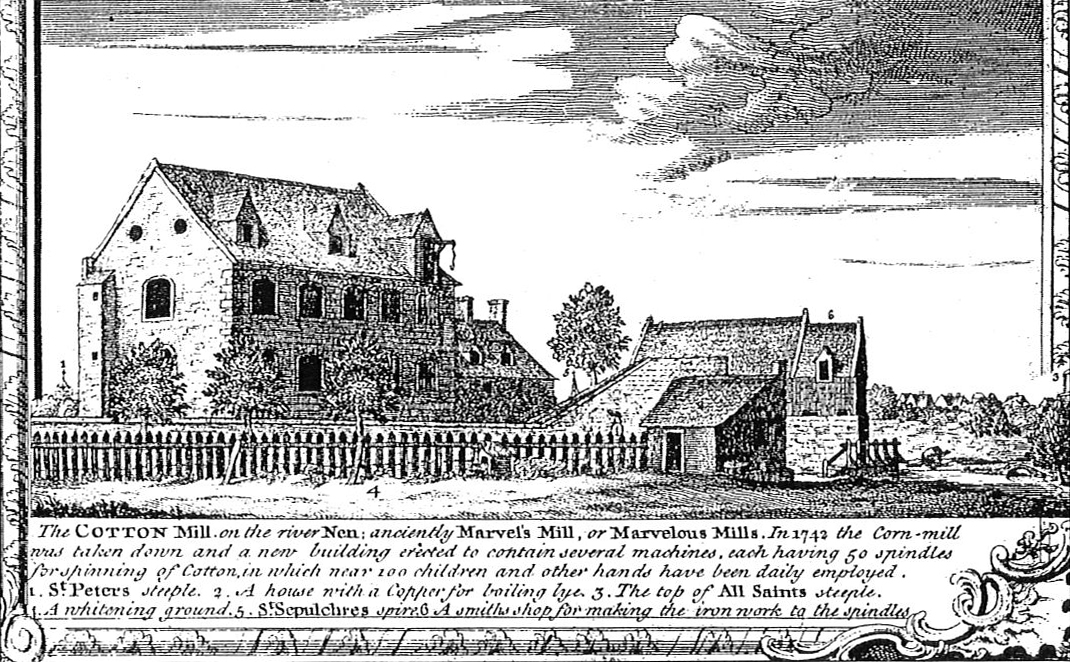
"The Cotton Mill on the River Nen", from Noble and Butlin's 1746 map of Northampton - the earliest known pictorial representation of a cotton mill.

Marvel's Mill (or Marvell's Mill) on the River Nene in Northampton, England, was the world's second factory for spinning cotton, the first to be operated as a water mill, and the first to be driven by an inanimate power-source. Opened by Edward Cave in 1742, it was one of the Paul-Wyatt cotton mills that used the roller spinning machinery invented by Lewis Paul and John Wyatt, which had first been used in their Upper Priory Cotton Mill in Birmingham in the summer of 1741.

== History ==
Marvel's Mill had a long history as a water-powered gristmill, being identified as Merewyns mill as early as 1253. Originally owned by Northampton's Priory of St Andrew, its ownership was taken up by the town of Northampton after the dissolution of the monasteries, and it was leased to a succession of tenants.

In 1742 the mill was acquired by Edward Cave, the publisher of The Gentleman's Magazine, who had become involved in the development of Lewis Paul and John Wyatt's newly invented roller-spinning machinery through the mutual acquaintance of the writer Samuel Johnson, and who had acquired a licence to operate five of Paul's machines with a total of 250 spindles at £3 per spindle. Cave purchased Marvell's Mill after being offered other mills in Romsey and Gloucester. After demolishing the existing corn mill, he erected a new building to house the spinning machinery, with outbuildings for boiling lye for bleaching, and a smith's workshop for maintaining the spindles.

Little is known of the operation of the mill, though surviving records indicate the appointment of a millwright Thomas Yeoman as the factory's "operator", in overall charge of the operation, as well as a manager Mr Harrison in charge of its day-to-day functioning, and a foreman Mr Newton, who had been involved in the earlier Birmingham mill. The operation was far from smooth however: records from April 1743 indicate projected annual profits of up to £599 with plans for twelve machines; by October of the same year only 50 of the planned 100 hands were working and the projected annual profit had declined to £113. Wyatt commented at the time that "The Cards and Carding, extremely ill maniged", "The Dirt and Cotton spread ab' the Rooms and the Pathways near the Mill is surprising" and "The Superintendant seems a very indifferent Maniger".

Despite these shortcomings the business survived and an engraving of 1746 shows it functioning and employing a full complement of 100 staff. On the death of Cave in 1754 the mill passed to his brother and nephew, and at this stage had the involvement of Samuel Touchet, one of the major merchants of the pre-industrial Lancashire cotton industry, who had also held licences to operate Paul's machinery since 1742 and had set up a second Birmingham mill, possibly in Fazeley Street, in 1744. Touchet made no profit, however, and in 1756 the mill and its machinery was advertised for sale. Eventually re-let to Lewis Paul, who resumed direct control, it was seized by the Caves for non-payment of rent in 1761 after Paul's death in 1759, and there is no evidence of cotton-spinning on the site beyond this date. By 1768 the mill was in the possession of "William Faulkner and Thomas Harris, millers" and by 1774 the yard was occupied by a shoemaker. The fate of the mill's spinning machinery is not known, but there are indications that it was acquired or at least seen by Richard Arkwright, whose 1769 patent was based on very similar principles.

== Bibliography ==
- Bates, David L. (1996), "Cotton-spinning in Northampton: Edward Cave's mill, 1742-1761", Northamptonshire Past and Present, 9 (3): 237–51
- Brown, John J. (January 1946), "Samuel Johnson and the First Roller-Spinning Machine", The Modern Language Review, 41 (1): 16–23, doi:10.2307/3717489, JSTOR 3717489
- Mantoux, Paul (1928), The Industrial Revolution in the Eighteenth Century: An Outline of the Beginnings of the Modern Factory System in England, London: Taylor & Francis (published 2006), ISBN 0-415-37839-7
- Page, William, ed. (1930), "The borough of Northampton: Trades", A History of the County of Northampton, Victoria County History, vol. 3, pp. 26–30
- Wadsworth, Alfred P.; Mann, Julia De Lacy (1931), The cotton trade and industrial Lancashire, 1600-1780, Manchester: Manchester University Press, OCLC 2859370
