= Joshua Kirton =

English bookseller and publisher

Joshua Kirton was an English bookseller and publisher.

He was responsible (sometimes with Thomas Warren) for the dissemination of a number of important works in the seventeenth century, including Francis Godwin's The Man in the Moone. His London business in Paul's Churchyard was destroyed in the 1666 Great Fire of London.

In 1648, he published The Right Way: a direction for obtaining good success in a weighty enterprise.

He also published books of the theologian André Rivet.

Kirton's notable clients included Samuel Pepys. He was also the primary bookseller and publisher of Thomas Hayne.
