= Birmingham Journal (eighteenth century) =

Periodical literature

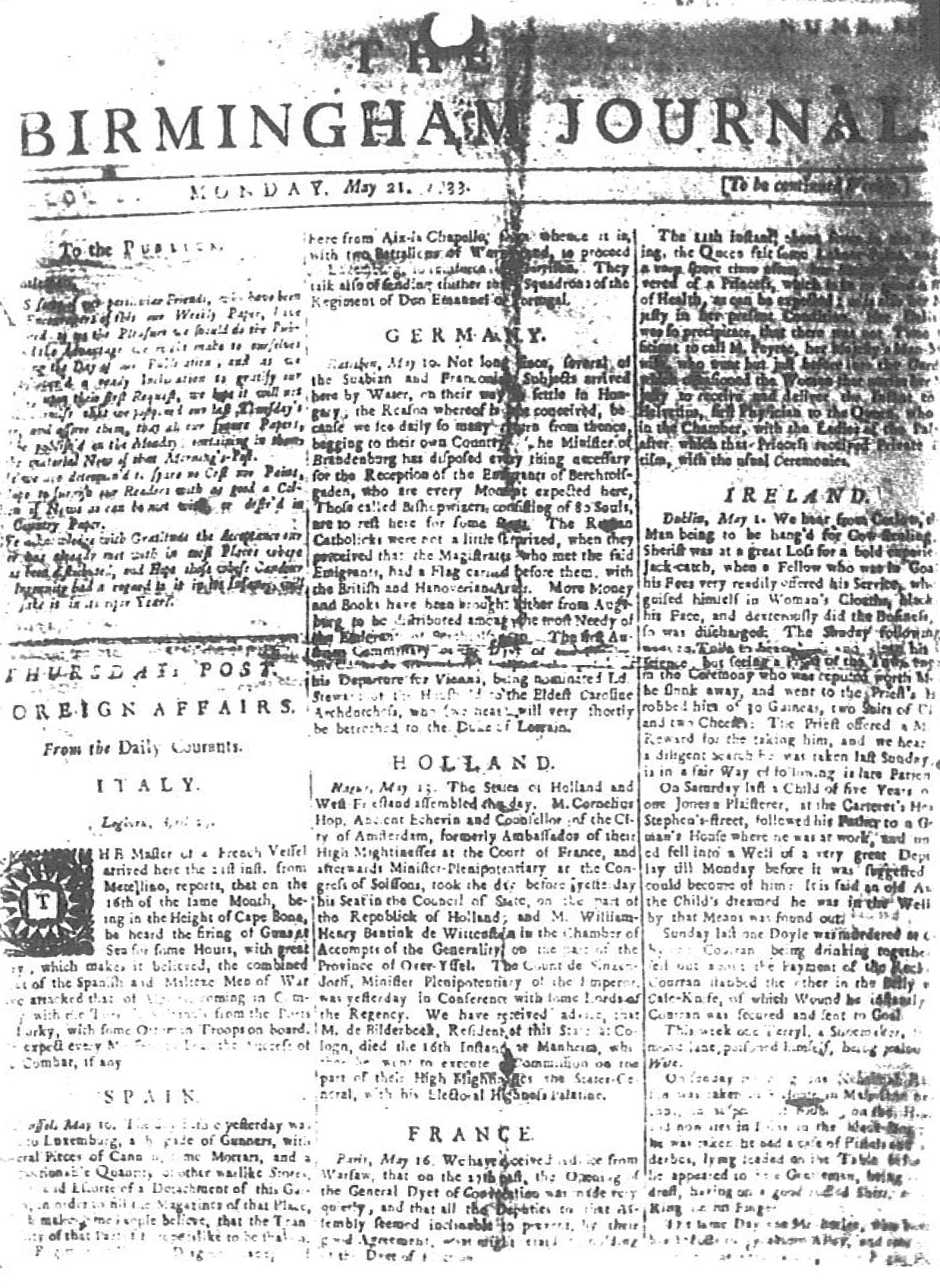
The only known surviving copy of the Birmingham Journal, dated 21 May 1733

The Birmingham Journal was the first newspaper known to have been published in Birmingham, England. Little is known of it as few records remain, but a single copy survives in the Library of Birmingham: Number 28, dated Monday May 21, 1733. It is assumed from this that the first edition was probably published on 14 November 1732.

== Background ==
The newspaper was published weekly (on Thursday) by local businessman and bookseller Thomas Warren from his house over the Swan Tavern in the High Street. Among its contributors was Samuel Johnson, whose work for the Journal while he was lodging with Warren in Birmingham in 1733 was his first original published writing. James Boswell wrote of this in his Life of Johnson:

Mr. Warren was the first established bookseller in Birmingham, and was very attentive to Johnson, who he soon found could be of much service to him in his trade, by his knowledge of literature; and he even obtained the assistance of his pen in furnishing some numbers of a periodical Essay printed in the newspaper, of which Warren was proprietor. After very diligent inquiry, I have not been able to recover those early specimens of that particular mode of writing by which Johnson afterwards so greatly distinguished himself.

Publication of the Birmingham Journal is known to have ceased by 1741.

== Johnson's role ==
There is no physical record that documents to what extent Johnson played a part in the making of the Journal. It is known that Johnson was asked by Warren to work on the paper, and that Warren respected the extent of Johnson's knowledge to the point that he wanted to harness it for the Journal. There was an old tradition among the Birmingham bookselling community that Johnson was an "assistant" to Warren and that Johnson wrote several of the essays that were printed in the paper. However, this cannot be verified because none of the papers printed during the months that Johnson could have worked on the Journal have survived.
