= Daniel Bourn =

Daniel Bourn was an English inventor, who took out a patent for a carding machine with rotating cylinders in 1748.

Though Bourn is thought likely to have had some association with Lancashire, at the time he received the patent he owned a Paul-Wyatt cotton-spinning mill at Leominster in Herefordshire.
