= Edward Cave =

English printer, editor and publisher

- Born: 27 February 1691
- Died: 10 January 1754 (aged 62)

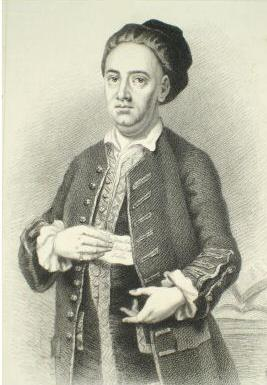
Edward Cave, engraving by Edward Scriven after a painting by Francis Kyte c. 1740

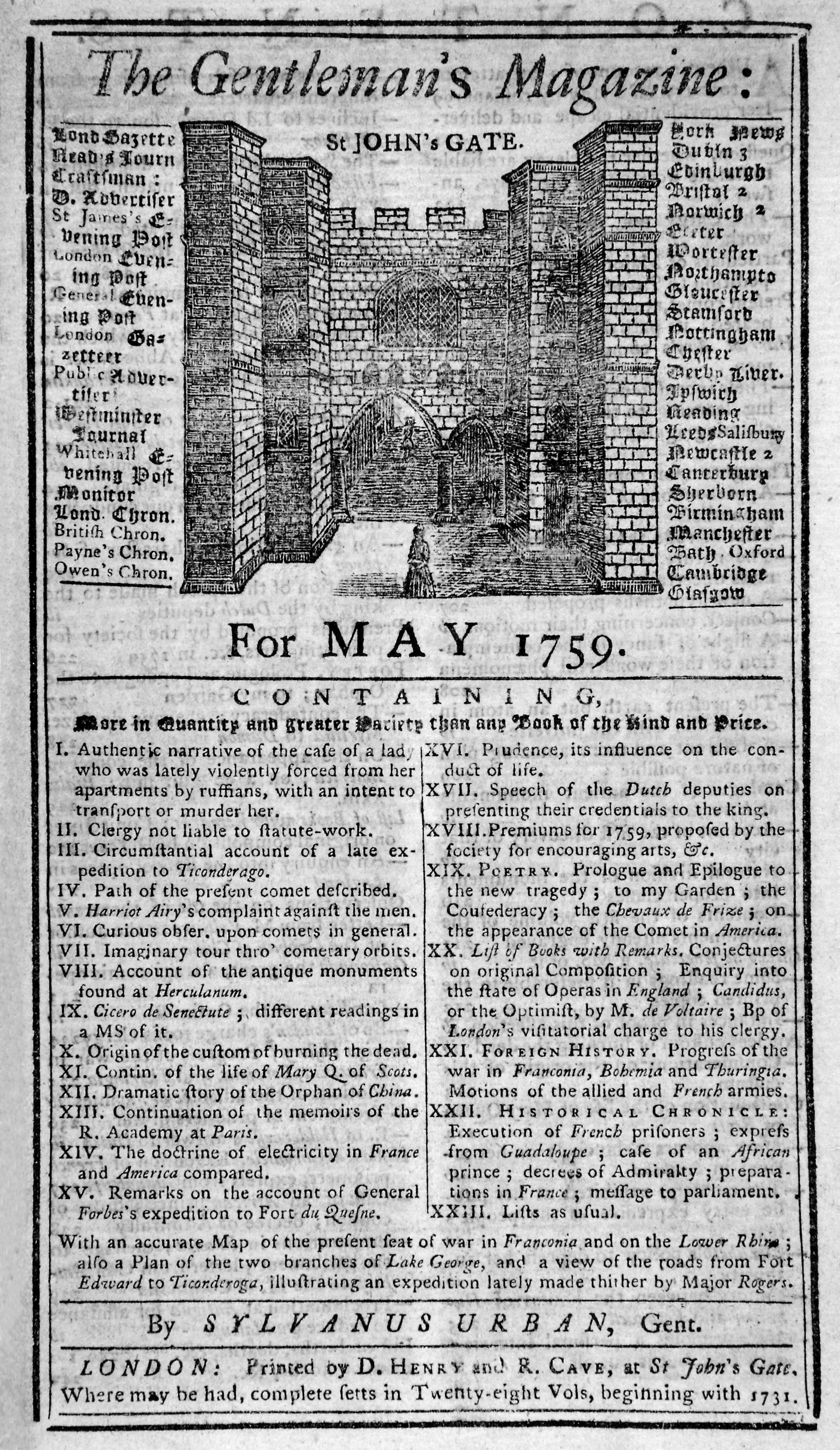
The Gentleman's Magazine, May 1759, "By SYLVANUS URBAN, Gent."

Edward Cave (27 February 1691 – 10 January 1754) was an English printer, editor and publisher. He coined the term "magazine" for a periodical, founding The Gentleman's Magazine in 1731, and was the first publisher to successfully fashion a wide-ranging publication.

== Early life ==
The son of a cobbler, Cave was born in Newton near Rugby, Warwickshire, and attended Rugby School, but was expelled after being accused of stealing from the headmaster Henry Holyoake. He worked at a variety of jobs, including timber merchant, reporter and printer.

== The Gentleman's Magazine ==
Cave conceived the idea of a periodical that would cover every topic the educated public was interested in, from commerce to poetry, and tried to convince several London printers and booksellers to take up the idea. When no one showed any interest, he took on the task himself.

The Gentleman's Magazine was launched in 1731 and soon became the most influential and most imitated periodical of its time. It has been credited with giving the name magazine to its genre of periodical writing and editorial content. It originated as a repository of articles culled from other publications, mainly books and pamphlets. The magazine's motto was E pluribus unum, which later became the traditional motto of the United States. Samuel Johnson joined the magazine in 1738, after which it started publishing reports and original writing. Cave too often contributed pieces to the Magazine under the pseudonym of Sylvanus Urban.

Cave was an astute businessman. He devoted all his energy to the magazine, and rarely left its offices at St John's Gate, Clerkenwell. He made use of many contributors, most famously Samuel Johnson, who was always grateful to Cave for having provided his principal employment for many years. The magazine also made Cave wealthy.

He also obtained a licence from Lewis Paul for 250 spindles for his patent roller-spinning machine, a precursor of the water frame. In 1742 he bought Marvel's Mill at Northampton and converted this to a cotton mill, probably the first water-powered spinning mill in the world. This was apparently profitable, but only modestly so. It closed in 1761, or soon after.

== Death ==
Cave suffered from gout. He is buried at St. James Church, Clerkenwell.
