= Lewis Paul =

English inventor

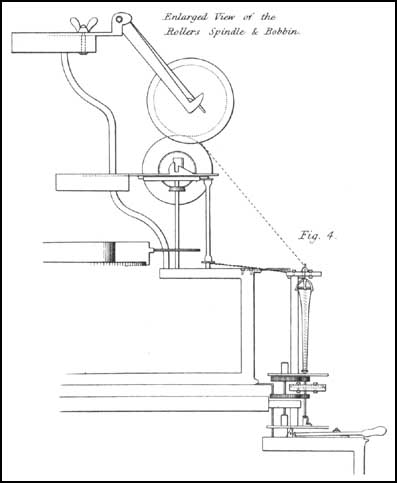
Diagram of rollers and bobbin from Paul's 1758 patent.

Lewis Paul (died 1759) was the original inventor of roller spinning, the basis of the water frame for spinning cotton in a cotton mill.

== Life and work ==
Lewis Paul was of Huguenot descent. His father was physician to Lord Shaftesbury. He may have begun work on designing a spinning machine for cotton as early as 1729, but probably did not make practical progress until after 1732 when he met John Wyatt, a carpenter then working in Birmingham for a gun barrel forger. Wyatt had designed a machine, probably for cutting files, in which Paul took an interest.

Roller spinning was certainly Paul's idea, and Wyatt built a machine (or model) for him. Paul obtained a patent for this on 24 June 1738. He then set about trying to license his machine, though some licences were granted in satisfaction of debts. In 1741, he set up a machine powered by two asses in the Upper Priory in Birmingham, near his house in Old Square.

== Mills using the roller spinning patent ==
Edward Cave, a publisher, obtained a licence and set up machines in a warehouse in London. In 1742, he acquired Marvel's Mill on the River Nene at Northampton. He rebuilt the mill to hold four or five water-powered spinning machines, each with 50 spindles. This was thus the first cotton mill. Cave died on 10 January 1754, so that the mill passed to his brother William and his nephew Paul. Samuel Touchet, a London merchant had the mill until 1755, but made no profit. It may then have been let to Lewis Paul, but he died in 1759. The Caves forfeited the lease for non-payment of rent in March 1761 and advertised the mill to let in November 1761. By 1768, the mill had reverted to being a corn mill.

Another mill that operated under Paul's patent was at Leominster. This was built in 1744 by John Bourn in partnership with Henry Morris of Lancashire. The mill burnt down in November 1754.

== Carding machines ==
In 1748, Daniel Bourn and Lewis Paul separately obtained patents for carding machines, which were presumably used in the Leominster and Northampton mills respectively. This carding technology of Lewis Paul and Daniel Bourn seems to be the basis of later carding machines.

== Achievements ==
The principle of his rolling spinning process was perfected by John Kay and Thomas Highs and promoted by Richard Arkwright. Paul's machine seems only to have been modestly profitable, and it is not clear to what extent his work is reflected in Arkwright's much more successful machine, the water frame, patented in 1769. Like Paul and Bourn, Arkwright subsequently added a carding stage to his machinery, but his use of this as a means of continuing his patent rights beyond the expiry of his original patent failed, because the improvement was not his invention.

== Bibliography ==
- A. P. Wadsworth and J. de L. Mann, The Cotton Industry and Industrial Lancashire (Manchester University Press 1931), 419-448.
- D. L. Bates, 'Cotton-spinning in Northampton: Edward Cave's Mill' Northamptonshire Past and Present IX(3) (1996), 237-51.
- W. English, The Textile Industry (Longmans, London 1931), 80-2.
- R. B. Prosser, ‘Paul, Lewis (d. 1759)’, rev. Gillian Cookson, Oxford Dictionary of National Biography, Oxford University Press, 2004, accessed 25 Feb 2008
