= John Wyatt (inventor) =

English inventor (1700–1766)

- Born: April 1700 near Lichfield, England
- Died: 29 November 1766 (aged 66)
- Known for: English inventor

John Wyatt (April 1700 – 29 November 1766), an English inventor, was born near Lichfield and was related to Sarah Ford, Doctor Johnson's mother. A carpenter by trade he began work in Birmingham on the development of a spinning machine. In 1733 he was working in the mill at New Forge (Powells) Pool, Sutton Coldfield attempting to spin the first cotton thread ever spun by mechanical means.

His principal partner was Lewis Paul (who was sponsored by the Duke of Shrewsbury) and together they developed the concept of elongating cotton threads by running them through rollers and then stretching them through a faster second set of rollers. They produced the first ever roller spinning machine but it was very successful. Paul took out thread in 1738 and in 1758, the year before he died.

In 1757 the Rev. John Dyer of Northampton recognised the importance of the Paul and Wyatt cotton spinning machine in his poem The Fleece (Dyer, p. 99):

A circular machine, of new design
In conic shape: it draws and spins a thread
Without the tedious toil of needless hands.
A wheel invisible, beneath the floor,
To ev'ry member of th' harmonius frame,
Gives necessary motion. One intent
O'erlooks the work; the carded wool, he says,
So smoothly lapped around those cylinders,
Which gently turning, yield it to yon cirue
Of upright spindles, which with rapid whirl
Spin out in long extenet an even twine.

Wyatt went to work for Matthew Boulton in his foundry in Birmingham. There he invented and produced a weighing machine and experimented with donkey power to run his spinning machine. He was brought down by his debts and was made bankrupt.

Despite their failures, their ideas laid the foundations for others who followed, particularly Sir Richard Arkwright.

In their book Das Kapital, Karl Marx and Friedrich Engels wrote:

Als John Wyatt 1735 seine Spinnmaschine und mit ihr die industrielle Revolution des 18. Jahrhunderts ankündigte, erwähnte er mit keinem Wort, daß statt eines Menschen ein Esel die Maschine treibe, und dennoch fiel diese Rolle dem Esel zu. Eine Maschine, "um ohne Finger zu spinnen", lautete sein Programm.(89) (~ When John Wyatt - in 1735 - announced his spinning machine and with that the industrial revolution of the 18th century, he did not mention that a donkey moved the machine [...].)

== See also ==
- Cotton-spinning machinery#History

== Sources ==
- Dyer, John. (1757). The Fleece. London.
- Baker, John Leon (2004). "Wyatt, John (1700–1766)". Oxford Dictionary of National Biography. Oxford University Press.
