= James Stewart (disambiguation) =

James Stewart (1908–1997) was an American actor and USAF brigadier general.

James Stewart may also refer to:

== Law ==
- James B. Stewart (born c. 1952), American lawyer, journalist, and author
- James Kirkpatrick Stewart, Canadian lawyer
- James McGregor Stewart (1889–1955), Canadian lawyer, president of the Canadian Bar Association
- James Stewart (solicitor) (born 1966), Northern Irish lawyer

== Military ==
- James Stewart (British Army general) (c. 1699–1768), British lieutenant-general, member of parliament for Wigtown Burghs
- James Stewart (artilleryman) (1826–1905), American Union military officer
- James A. Stewart (Medal of Honor) (1839–?), United States Marine and Medal of Honor recipient
- James Stewart (Australian Army officer) (1884–1947)
- James N. Stewart, United States Air Force major general and Trump administration official
- James P. Stewart (1924–2019), United States Coast Guard admiral
- James T. Stewart (1921–1990), United States Air Force general
- James Stewart of Cardonald (1512–1584), Scottish landowner and soldier

== Monarchs of the House of Stewart ==
- James I of Scotland (1394–1437)
- James II of Scotland (1430–1460)
- James III of Scotland (1451–1488)
- James IV of Scotland (1473–1513)
- James V of Scotland (1512–1542)
- James VI and I of Scotland and England
- James II of England and VII of Scotland
- James Francis Edward Stuart (1688–1766), Jacobite pretender as James VIII and III

== Noblemen ==
- James Stewart, 5th High Steward of Scotland (1260–1309)
- James Stewart, the Black Knight of Lorn (c. 1383–after 1451)
- James Mor Stewart (c. 1400–1429 or 1449)
- James "Beag" Stewart (died 1470), son of James Mor Stewart
- James Stewart, 1st Earl of Buchan (1442–1499)
- James Stewart, Duke of Ross (1476–1504)
- James Stewart, 1st Earl of Moray (1501 creation) (c. 1501–1544)
- James Stewart, 5th Lord Innermeath (died 1586), Scottish courtier and landowner
- James Stewart, Commendator of Kelso and Melrose (c. 1529–1557), member of the Scottish royal family
- James Stewart, 1st Lord Doune (1529–1590), Scottish landowner
- James Stewart, 1st Earl of Moray (c. 1531–1570)
- James Stewart, 2nd Earl of Moray (died 1592), Scottish nobleman
- James Stewart, Earl of Arran (died 1596)
- James Stewart, 1st Duke of Richmond (1612–1655), British nobleman
- James Stewart, 4th Lord Ochiltree (died 1658), Scottish noble

== Politics ==
=== Great Britain and Ireland ===
- Sir James Stewart (advocate, born 1635) (1635–1713), Scottish lawyer and politician, Lord Advocate 1692–1709 and 1711–13
- Sir James Stewart, 1st Baronet (1681–1727), Scottish lawyer and politician, Solicitor General for Scotland 1709–14 and 1714–17, son of the above
- Sir James Stewart, 7th Baronet (died 1827), Irish politician
- James Stewart (Honiton MP) (1805–1860), English politician
- James Stewart (Greenock MP) (1827–1895), Scottish Liberal politician
- James Stewart (Glasgow MP) (1863–1931), Scottish Labour Party politician, MP for Glasgow St. Rollox, 1922–1931
- James Henry Keith Stewart (1783–1836), Scottish Tory member of parliament for Wigtown Burghs
- Sir James Henderson-Stewart (1897–1961), British banker, army officer and politician
- James Stewart (Irish politician) (1934–2013), Irish communist activist
- James Stewart (Northern Ireland politician), Unionist politician from Northern Ireland

=== United States ===
- James Stewart (North Carolina politician) (1775–1821), United States congressman from North Carolina
- James Augustus Stewart (1808–1879), U.S. congressman from Maryland
- James E. Stewart (politician) (1814–1890), American politician and judge in Virginia
- James F. Stewart (1851–1904), United States representative from New Jersey
- James H. Stewart (1859–1924), teacher and Republican politician in Texas
- James Garfield Stewart (1880–1959), Republican from Cincinnati, Ohio
- James Stewart (Wisconsin politician) (1936–2021), Wisconsin state legislator

=== Elsewhere ===
- James Stewart (Nova Scotia politician) (1765–1830), lawyer, judge and politician in Nova Scotia
- James Stewart (Queensland politician) (1851–1931), Australian senator from Queensland
- James Stewart (South Australian politician) (1842–1871), pastoralist and politician in the colony of South Australia
- James David Stewart (1874–1933), Prince Edward Island premier
- James Stewart II (1763–1828), Jamaican slave owner and politician

== Religion ==
- James Stewart (bishop) (died 1466), Roman Catholic Bishop of Moray, Scotland
- James Haldane Stewart (1778–1854), American priest in England
- James Stewart (missionary) (1831–1905), missionary and physician in South Africa and Moderator of the General Assembly of the Free Church of Scotland
- James Stewart (minister, born 1896) (1896–1990), Moderator of the General Assembly of the Church of Scotland and Chaplain to the Queen

== Sports ==
=== Football and rugby ===
- James Stewart (footballer, born 1883) (1883–1957), English international footballer (Sheffield Wednesday, Newcastle United and Rangers)
- James Stewart (footballer, born 1885) (1885–?), Scottish footballer (Motherwell, Liverpool)
- James Stewart (rugby union) (1890–1973), New Zealand rugby union player
- James "Little Man" Stewart (born December 27, 1971), American football running back for the Jacksonville Jaguars and the Detroit Lions
- James Stewart (Minnesota Vikings) (born December 8, 1971), American football running back for the Minnesota Vikings
- James Stewart (Australian footballer) (born 1994), Australian rules footballer for Essendon

=== Other sports ===
- James Stewart (Australian cricketer)
- James Stewart (English cricketer) (1861–1943)
- James Stewart (basketball) (1910–1990), Canadian basketball player
- James Stewart (decathlete) (1906–1991), American decathlete and high jumper
- James Stewart (rower) (born 1973), Australian rower
- James Stewart Jr. (born 1985), professional motocross racer

== Others ==
- James Hope Stewart (1789–1883), Scottish natural history artist
- James Stewart (engraver) (1791–1863), Scottish engraver
- James Stewart of the Glen (died 1752), Scotsman accused of accessory to the murder of Cailean Ruadh Caimbeul
- James G. Stewart (1907–1997), American audio engineer
- James Stewart (archaeologist) (1913–1962), Australian archaeologist
- James Wallace Stewart (1921–2006), English professor of haematology
- James Stewart (mathematician) (1941–2014), Canadian professor of mathematics at McMaster University
- James B. Stewart (economist) (born 1947), emeritus professor of Economics and African-American Studies
- James Stewart (Australian actor) (born 1975), in television series Breakers and Monarch Cove
- James R. Stewart (1903–1964), American president of the Universal Negro Improvement Association
- James E. Stewart (civil rights leader)
- Stewart Granger (James Lablanche Stewart, 1913–1993), English actor

== See also ==
- James Steuart (disambiguation)
- James Stewart-Mackenzie (disambiguation)
- James Stuart (disambiguation)
- Jamie Stewart (disambiguation)
- Jim Stewart (disambiguation)
- Jimmy Stewart (disambiguation)
- Stewart James, Canadian magician
