= Jim Stewart =

Jim Stewart may refer to:

== Australian rules footballers ==
- Jim Stewart (footballer, born 1884) (1884–1951), played for St Kilda and Carlton
- Jim Stewart (footballer, born 1888) (1888–1939), played for St Kilda
- Jim Stewart (footballer, born 1889) (1889–1964), played for South Melbourne
- Jim Stewart (footballer, born 1917) (1917–1942), played for North Melbourne

== Other sports ==
- Jim Stewart (cricketer) (born 1934), former Welsh cricketer who played for Warwickshire
- Jim Stewart (Scottish footballer) (born 1954), association football goalkeeper (Kilmarnock, Middlesbrough, Rangers, Scotland)
- Jim Stewart (Queen's Park footballer), Scottish football right half
- Jim Stewart (ice hockey) (born 1957), American ice hockey goaltender
- Jim Stewart (rugby union) (born 1994), Australian rugby union player
- Jim Stewart (high jumper) (1906–1991), American high jumper and decathlete
- Crown Royal Presents The Jim Stewart 400, NASCAR Nextel Cup event named after an unrelated Jim Stewart

== Others ==
- J. I. M. Stewart (1906–1994), Scottish writer (often using pseudonym Michael Innes)
- Jim Stewart (politician) (born 1958), American politician and state legislator in Kentucky
- Jim Stewart (record producer) (1930–2022), co-founder of Stax Records

== See also ==
- James Stewart (disambiguation)
- Jimmy Stewart (disambiguation)
- Jim Stuart (1919–1985), American football player
