= Jamie Stewart =

Jamie Stewart may refer to:

== Musicians ==
- Jamie Stewart (American musician) (born 1978), leader of the American musical group Xiu Xiu
- Jamie Stewart (English musician) (born 1964), bassist of the 1980s British post-punk/hard rock group The Cult

== Others ==
- Jamie B. Stewart, President and CEO of the Federal Farm Credit Banks Funding Corporation
- Jamie Stewart (EastEnders)
- Jamie Stewart (cricketer) (born 1970), Australian cricketer

== See also ==
- Jamie Stuart (born 1976), English footballer
- James Stewart (disambiguation)
- James Stuart (disambiguation)
