= Hog's Back =

Hill in Surrey, England

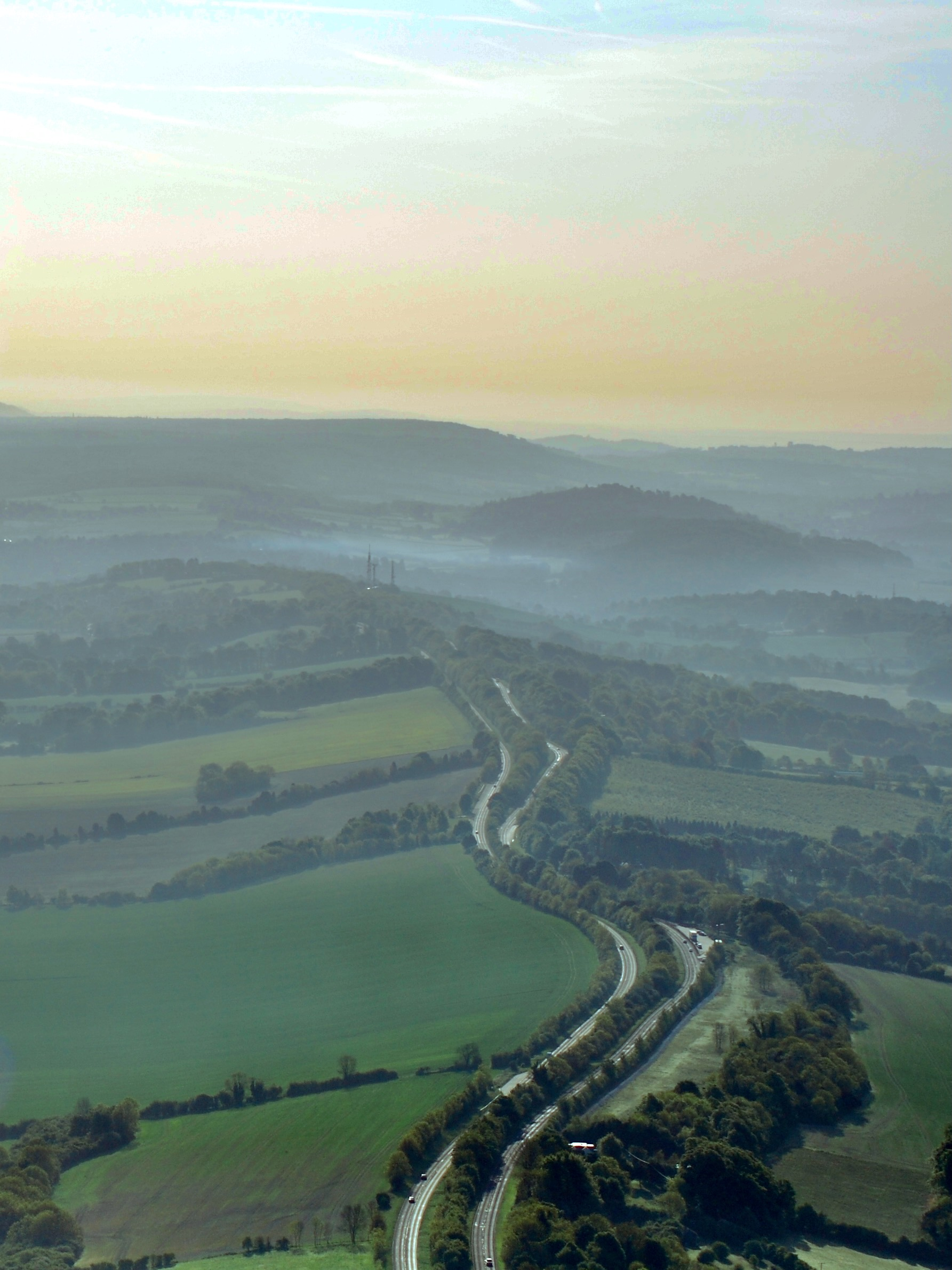
- Aerial photograph of the Hog's Back, looking east towards Guildford. The A31 dual carriageway runs along the spine of the ridge.

Highest point
- Elevation: 154 m (505 ft)
- Coordinates: 51°13′36″N 0°38′36″W

Geography
- Location within Surrey
- Parent range: North Downs

The Hog's Back is a hilly ridge, part of the North Downs in Surrey, England. It runs between Farnham in the west and Guildford in the east.

== Toponym ==
Compared with the main part of the Downs to the east of it, it is a narrow elongated ridge, hence its name.

Jane Austen, in a letter to her sister Cassandra dated Thursday 20 May 1813 from her brother's house in Sloane Street, wrote of her journey to London in a curricle via "the Hog's-back"

"Upon the whole it was an excellent journey & very thoroughly enjoyed by me; the weather was delightful the greatest part of the day. ... I never saw the country from the Hogsback so advantageously."

This shows that it was known as the Hog's Back by Jane Austen's time. However, the medieval name for the ridge was Guildown (recorded first in 1035 where it was the site of the abduction of Prince Alfred of Wessex by Earl Godwin and then in the Pipe Rolls for 1190 and onwards) but this name is no longer in use. However, the name Guildown is evoked by Guildown Road, a residential road that climbs the southern side of the ridge on the southwestern fringes of Guildford.

The Guild- element of Guildown is the same as that found in Guildford, meaning "gold". Various explanations have been suggested for the relationship between the names of Guildown and Guildford. Guildown may be an abbreviation of Guildford Down ("the Down by Guildford"). The Hog's Back ends at Guildford, which is the point where the River Wey cuts through the North Downs. Alternatively, both Guildown and Guildford may derive independently from a gold-coloured feature; either the yellow flowers of the marsh marigold or the gold-coloured (sandy) soil of the hillside.

== Geology ==
The Hog's Back is formed of chalk of Cretaceous age, laid down in shallow seas from the deposition of the calcium carbonate skeletons of micro-organisms. The Hog's Back is the surface representation of a monoclinal fold, where once horizontal chalk beds have been folded into steeply sloping layers. Across much of the North Downs, the angle of the chalk as it disappears below the surface is relatively shallow (c. 18° near Dorking), however at the Hog's Back, local faulting has produced a much steeper angle (up to 55°). To the north of the ridge lies the London Clay, and to the south the clays of the Wealden Group. The chalk is more resistant to weathering than the flanking clays, leading to the ridge's prominence over the surrounding terrain.

The Hog's Back gives its name to the geomorphological landform known as a Hogback, which is a long narrow ridge or series of hills with a narrow crest and steep slopes of nearly equal inclination on both flanks.

== Geography ==
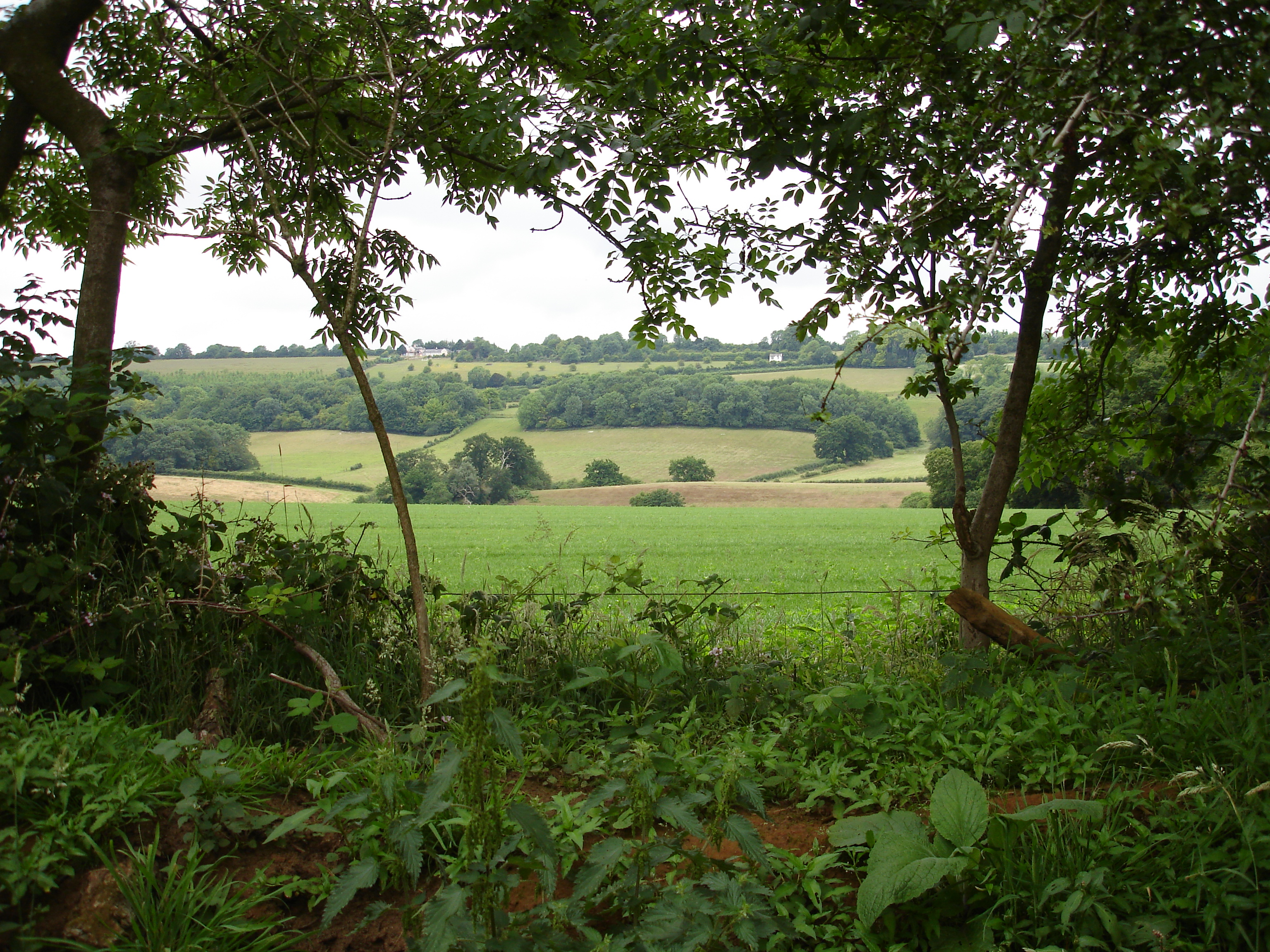
The Hog's Back seen from the North Downs Way at Puttenham.

The Hog's Back has a minimum prominence (drop) of 55 metres (180 ft), reaching 154 m (505 ft) above sea level, the 24th highest hill in Surrey.

Along its course are half panoramas north and south separated by less than 100 m (330 ft) viewable from paths alongside the road which runs along the Hog's Back (the A31).

The view north includes many towns and villages, including Woking, Ash and Aldershot which on a clear day reaches to London, as far as Canary Wharf, Tower 42, The Gherkin, Wembley Arch and Heathrow Airport. The view to the south is unspoilt and has been designated an area of outstanding natural beauty as well as a site of special scientific interest. These views extend to Hindhead and the Devil's Punchbowl.

== History ==
The route along the Hog's Back is ancient, since its raised position offered travellers a vantage point and also kept them above the thick ancient woodland of the valleys on either side. It was part of the ancient ridgeway which runs from Wiltshire down to the east coast of Kent. The Hog's Back might have been "the Via Regia of early deeds and Hundred Rolls".

The road is part of the highway from London to Winchester. Although there is very little archaeological evidence in support, it has been suggested that a Roman road ran from London to Winchester and that, at this point, it passed, either over the Hog's Back or perhaps a little to the north (e.g. Roman Surrey, David Bird, 2004). Research on this is continuing.

The original A31 along the Hog's Back originally formed part of a road leading directly from Winchester into Guildford High Street and from there into London. However, the modern A31 adopts a slightly less direct and less steep approach to the High Street, and reorganisation of central Guildford into a roundabout road system centred on the Friary Centre (named after the medieval Dominican Friary there) has also broken up this direct stretch of road at the point that it reaches Guildford, where it ends at the junction with the A3.

When the idea of the Pilgrims' Way to Canterbury was popularised in the nineteenth century, a route over the southern slopes of the Hog's back, parallel with the ridgeway and running through Seale and Puttenham, was incorporated in its course. In order to avoid the A31, however, the Pilgrims' Way does not run along the top of the Hog's Back.

The Hog's Back stretch of the A31 is now a dual carriageway, but the two directions of the road are separated by a central area of trees, some of them very old. The original road ran along the stretch now occupied by the lanes running from Guildford to Farnham, i.e. from east to west. The other two lanes, running from west to east, which are a little below the high point occupied by the original carriageways, were added in the early 1970s.

== Archaeology ==
Roughly midway along the ridge of the Hog’s Back between Farnham and Guildford (OS grid reference SU911483), the human remains of at least six skeletons were discovered in 1935 when ground was being dug for a new water pipe. They were buried less than a yard from the then-northern edge of the road (now part of the central grass verge between the two carriageways). One of them was buried prone and another showed signs of having originally been bound or trussed, and scholars now believe that they were criminals buried here after execution at different times over an extended period (Reynolds in 2005; Briggs in 2010).

Their burial place was at the meeting point of the parishes of Wanborough, Seale (originally Farnham) and Puttenham, which were each in the different hundreds of Woking, Farnham and Godalming respectively. It is suggested by Rob Briggs that an elevated site at the junction of different hundreds and parishes was probably a site of general assembly and he identifies it with the place name Seven Ditches, found in the charter of King Caedwalla of Wessex confirming Farnham to the Bishop of Winchester (following the original grant by King Edward the Elder in 909 AD) (Latin vii dica); and also in a feoffment defining the Shoelands estate in about 1210 (Latin “Seuedic”); and also in the plea rolls of the 1263 Surrey Eyre, noting the hanging of one Robert de la Felde of Send at (Latin) “Seinedik”, translated Sendike or Seven Ditches.

== Notable buildings ==
On the north side of the Hog's Back near the turn off to the village of Seale formerly stood a mansion known as Poyle Hill Lodge. This was once one of the Admiralty semaphore stations because of its high vantage point. In 1935 it became the Hog's Back Hotel, initially owned by the Guildford Friary Brewery, and it remains a hotel, now officially known as the Hog's Back Hotel and Spa, Farnham.

On the south side of the Hog's Back, a little to the east of Poyle Hill, another large mansion was built in 1873 called Great Down, attributed to Robert Kerr. This was demolished in about 1950, but the parkland and other associated buildings, such as a lodge and stables, remain.

Also on the south side is Greyfriars House, a Grade II* listed Arts and Crafts style mansion built in 1896 by the renowned architect Charles Voysey. It is now a boutique wedding venue.

The Hogs Back Brewery is an independent real ale brewery based in Tongham, which is a village just below the Hog's Back.

The Hog's Back Cafe is in a layby on the Guildford to Farnham (westbound) carriageway of the A31 along the Hog's Back, between the turn offs to Puttenham and Seale. It is popular with lorry drivers, who use the cafe and toilets during the day. The hillside adjacent to the A31 layby was a popular site for dogging (viewing or participating in sexual relations in a public place), but recently (2012–13) Guildford police and local residents are curbing these practices.

Towards Guildford, on the northeast side of the Hog’s Back, lie Down Place and Blackwell Farm. The manor of Down Place was demolished in 1963, all that remains today of the estate are the stables where is established Hogs Back Books, the children’s book publisher.
Once associated with the manor as one of the first model farms in Surrey, Blackwell Farm is now a place of controversies since the University of Surrey, its owner, announced its plan to build a "Garden Neighbourhood" as part of Guildford Borough Council's local plan consultation.

== In popular culture ==
The Hog's Back is mentioned in:

- Richard Thompson's song MGB-GT on his 1994 album Mirror Blue.
- The Freeman Wills Crofts detective novel The Hog's Back Mystery (1933) ISBN 1-84232-396-2
- Brave New World (1932) by Aldous Huxley.
- Three Men on the Bummel (1900) by Jerome K. Jerome.
- The Adventure of Johnnie Waverly, an episode in season one of the TV Series, Agatha Christie's Poirot.
- The Paul Temple radio detective story, Paul Temple and the Gilbert Case.
- Bulldog Drummond, novel by "Sapper"
