= Seale, Surrey =

Village and parish in Surrey, England

Coordinates: 51°13′22″N 0°43′01″W

Seale
- Village
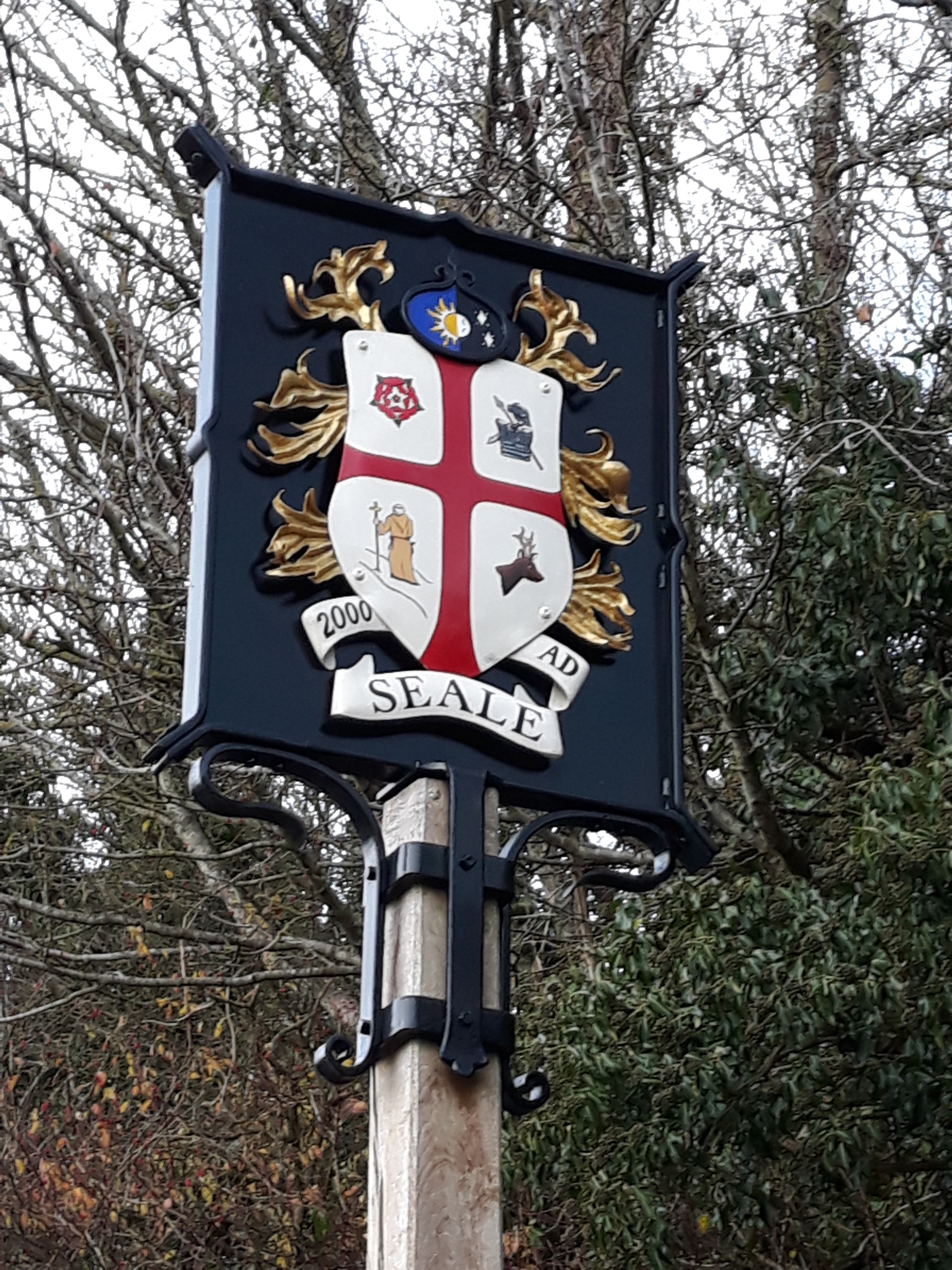
- Village sign

- Location within Surrey
- Population: 907 (2001 Civil Parish Census)
- OS grid reference: SU8947
- Civil parish: Seale and Sands
- District: Guildford
- Shire county: Surrey
- Region: South East
- Country: England
- Sovereign state: United Kingdom
- Post town: Farnham
- Postcode district: GU10
- Dialling code: 01252
- Police: Surrey
- Fire: Surrey
- Ambulance: South East Coast
- UK Parliament: Godalming and Ash

Seale is a village in Surrey, England. Seale covers most of the civil parish of Seale and Sands and the steep slope and foot of the south side of the Hog's Back (mid-western section of the North Downs between Farnham and Guildford) as well as a large hill which exceeds it – as such is part of the Surrey Hills Area of Outstanding Natural Beauty.

== Etymology ==
Current localities

The name, Seale, may derive from the Old English word for "hall" or, alternatively, for "willow" (see for example Salfords). Also possibly, a Viking word meaning, "to the pig", (in references to the Hog's Back).

The Sands is not a relatively old name for any part of Seale, first recorded in Tudor period records, and derives from the quantities of Bargate sandstone and sand present in the far north-west of the Greensand Ridge especially in its high uplands, crowned here by the highest point in the parish, Crooksbury Hill.

Former settlement or farmstead

Binton Farm takes its name from a Saxon settlement of Binton, which bears the prefix of an Old English personal name and standard suffix for any settlement.

== Topography ==
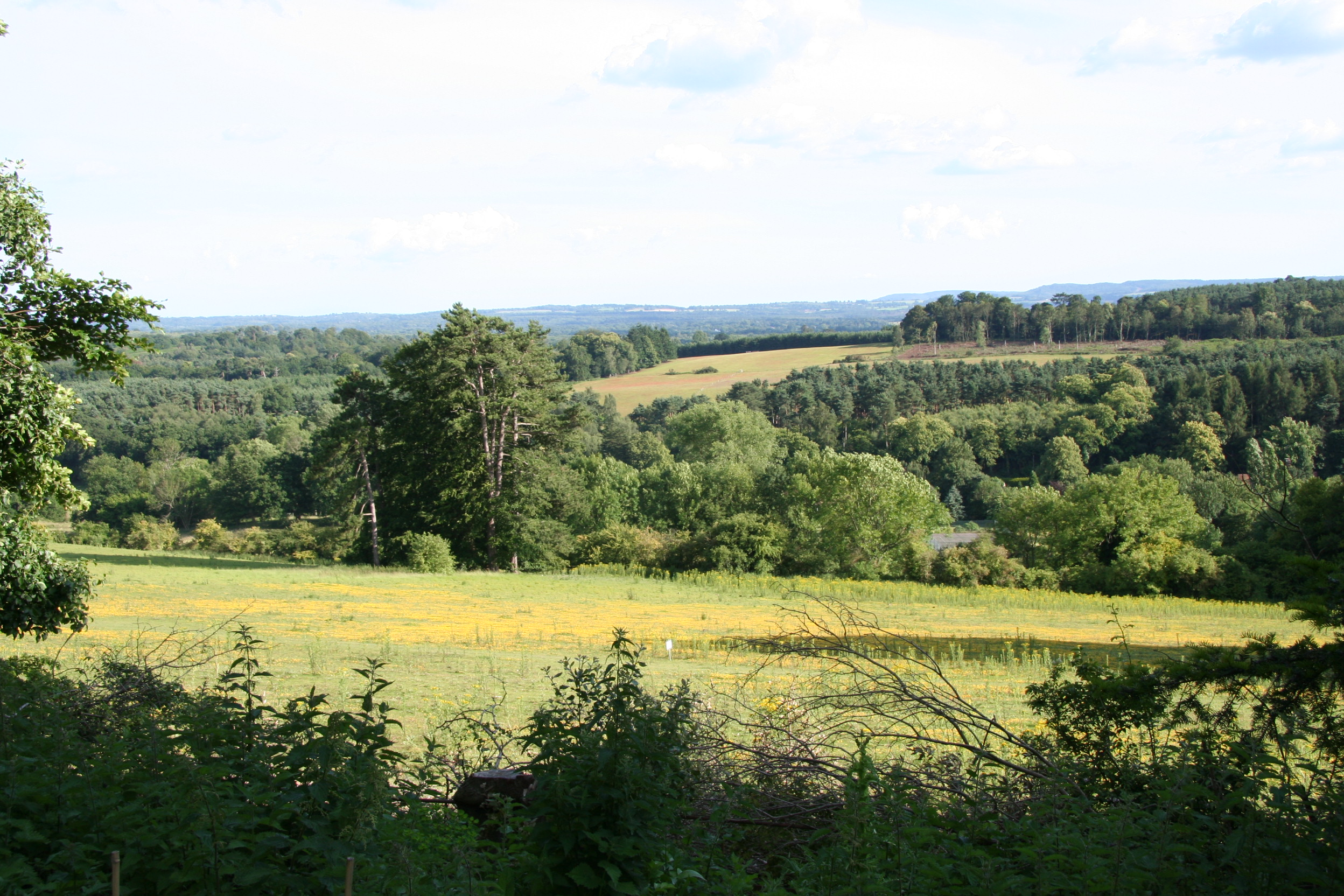
View of Seale parish from the slopes of the North Downs looking south towards the Pilgrims' Way and Greensand Ridge beyond

At the top of a short dry valley, at the foot of the steep Hog's Back, is the parish church of St Laurence, Seale. 800m down the valley is a spring, whose stream leads to Cutt Mill and hence to the Wey. The land undulates, between 165m in the southwest, down to 55m in the east. The north border is the 100 to 140m crest of a long range of hills with the popular name, the Hog's Back.

== History ==
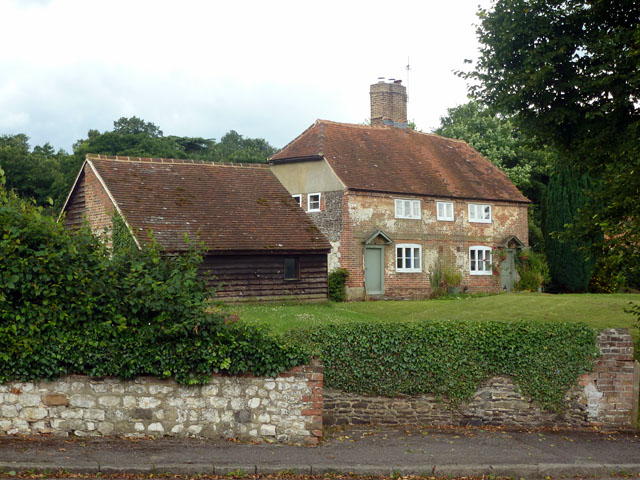
Twin listed homes that date almost wholly to the 18th century

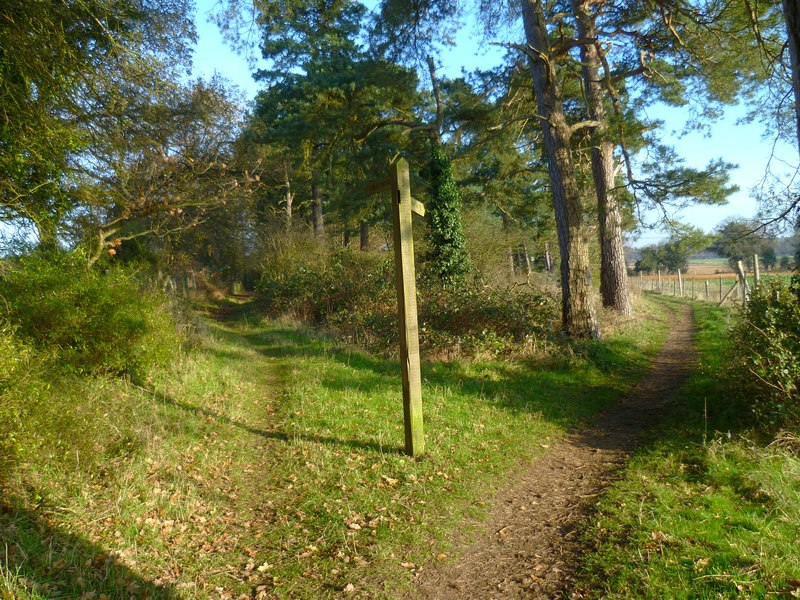
Sand-adapted plants on one of the more undulating stretches of the North Downs Way

Seale in the Kingdom of England remained in its county but was also in the hundred of Farnham (Note: Hundreds faded into economic, then official insignificance by the late 19th century and completely by the time of the Local Government Act 1894). Successive bishops retained right of free warren and other manorial privileges into the 19th century.

Seale's medieval parish church and rector served equally Tongham to the north until 1866, however much of the land was owned by the Bishop of Winchester who owned much of far-west Surrey since the early holder of that position Henry (of Blois) or Winchester, who used his power and status to build Farnham Castle.

The manor farm, evidencing this, were tenants of the Bishops of Winchester "for three lives" from 1839 (although they sold this interest in 1856).

From the Tudor period, as evidenced by memorials in Seale church, the main landowner was the Woodroffe family (of whom two, David and Nicholas, father and son, were Sheriffs of London in 1554 and 1573 respectively), and later, by descent through a female line, the Chester family. They were seated at Poyle, Tongham, on the other side of the Hog's Back, which was originally part of the parish of Seale; their landholdings also extended south of the Hog's Back into what remained of the parish of Seale after Tongham was split off into a separate parish in 1866. As late as 1899, Henry Chester objected to being asked to give up his pew in Seale Church when a new plan was circulated by the churchwardens. The mansion at Poyle Park is now demolished and its lands subdivided in the twentieth century – an interior from Poyle Park is on display in the Museum of London.

Hampton Lodge (below) was originally a hunting lodge, occupied by the wealthy Long family. In the 19th century, it passed through a female line into the hands of a branch of the Howard family of the Dukes of Norfolk (and Earls of Surrey) who took up residence and enlarged their estate by acquisition until it became, from about 1918, the largest landholding in the parish of Seale. The Hampton Estate was sold by the Howard family to the Thornton family in 1929 and remains in the hands of their descendants.

Wood Lane, which runs from the nucleus of Seale up to the top of the Hog's Back, shares its name with that of the family who leased Seale Manor Farm.

== Amenities ==
=== Village hall ===
The village hall, near the old school, is a venue for regular events and hosts parish council meetings.

=== Church ===
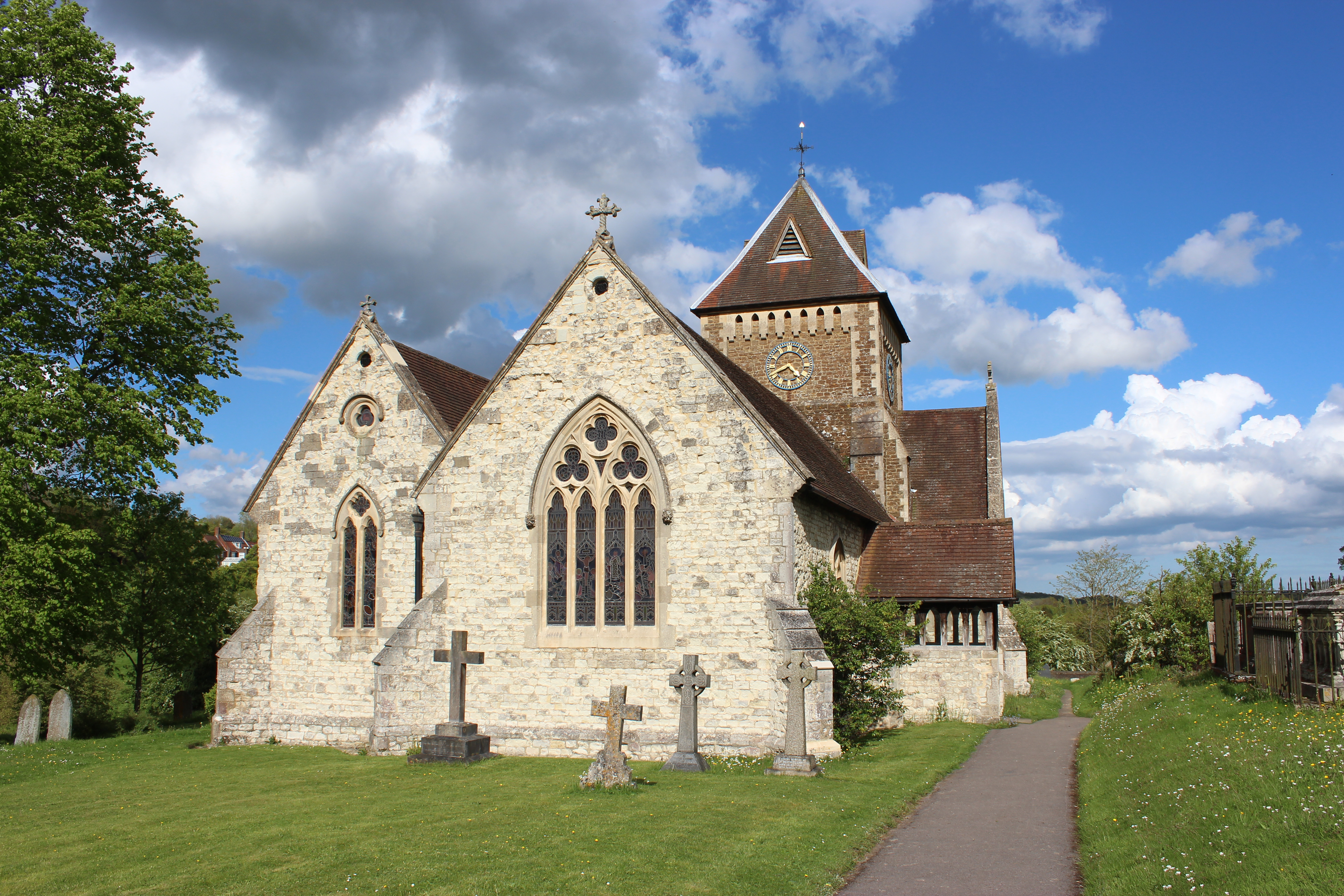
St Laurence's church

The church was established in the 12th century as an outpost of Waverley Abbey. The bell tower houses a peal of six bells, the oldest and largest cast in the 16th century. The church was extensively restored and enlarged in about 1860. It is served by a rector, who now also has care of the adjacent parishes of Puttenham and Wanborough. These three parishes were formally merged in 2004, although they retain their separate places of worship. Tongham was originally part of the parish of Seale, but it became an independent parish in 1866.

=== Golf course ===
In the west of the parish, associated with The Sands which is immediately south-east of it, is Farnham Golf Club. The first five holes start in parkland after which there is a sudden change in scenery as the pine trees close in and the heather replaces the grass.

== Landmarks ==
=== Oldest house ===
The oldest building, apart from the church, is The Lyttons, a Grade II listed house which stands next to the churchyard but away from the road. This was originally an open hall house as shown by blackened rafters and the oldest parts of the fabric have been dated to the early 1500s. A brick chimney was inserted and the open hall was divided into an upper and lower storey by the insertion of an upper floor in the 1600s.

The next oldest building is nearby East End Farm, another Grade II listed building which dates from the later part of the 1500s: about 1560–1580 compared with the Lyttons' dating of circa 1520–1550.

=== Houses associated with Manor Farm ===
Adjacent to the church are 17th and 18th century joined buildings, known as Manor Farm, converted into craft shops and a tea room.

Manor Farm Cottages, and Seale Lodge Cottages stand opposite the church, clustered around the craft shop/tea room. These date to the early 18th century. Beside them is Stable Cottage of later that century.

=== Hampton Estate ===
Most of the non-forested, agricultural land in Seale is appurtenant to (attached to or let by the owners of) Hampton Lodge, a Grade II listed Regency period mansion of c.1810. The tall two-storey house is Stuccoed brick to its façade with mansard slate roofs and some fishscale banding. This estate is an early 20th-century merger of land formerly owned by the Long family, land formerly that of Seale Lodge, and agricultural and parkland formerly comprising the Great Down estate, centred on another mansion at the top of the Hog's Back, Great Down, which was demolished in the 1950s. The Hampton Estate was acquired by Eustace Thornton in 1929. He was succeeded by his son, Sir Richard Thornton, KCVO, OBE, Lord Lieutenant of Surrey 1986–1997 and then by Sir Richard's daughter and son-in-law, Bridget and Bill Biddell.

=== Heathersett, Littleworth and park gardens ===
The 1873, rubblestone built, stone dressed, Grade II listed building in its listed park in the far south known as Heathersett, Littleworth has been attributed to R. Norman, architect. The listed park is due to its later designer, Gertrude Jekyll. James Mangles, who lived at Valewood, Haslemere, was one of the earliest rhododendron collectors and hybridisers. When James died in 1884, most of his plant collection was brought to Littleworth Cross and Harry continued hybridising and exhibiting rhododendrons, with the help of his sister Clara. Gertrude Jekyll (1843–1932), who lived nearby at Munstead, knew the Mangles family and was visiting one afternoon in May 1889 when she was introduced to a young architect, Edwin Lutyens (1869–1944) who was designing a gardener's cottage and some garden buildings for Harry Mangles. The meeting was important for both Lutyens and Jekyll: she discovered someone with a similar love of the vernacular architecture of south-west Surrey, who would design her new home, Munstead Wood (qv), and through her, he was introduced to many potential clients. Lutyens and Jekyll began a collaboration of building and garden design that would last until her death in 1932.

Former landmarks

Seale Lodge, built in ornate style with surrounding landholdings fell into dilapidation and was demolished c. 1970.

The village school has closed and been converted into a private house.

== Transport ==
The village is well connected by roads but not rail and had approximately 50% of its working population recorded in 2011 as commuting 20–40 km, living in the rural outer Metropolitan Green Belt yet commuting to major employment areas such as London, Farnborough, Fleet and Aldershot.

Specific long-distance roads are the A31 and the A331 roads (the Blackwater Valley Route) dual carriageway; along the entire northern border and 1 mile (1.6 km) north-west, respectively.

== See also ==
- Seale Chalk Pit

== Notes and references ==
Notes
