= Sandy Cross =

Sandy Cross may refer to:

- Sandy Cross, East Sussex
- Sandy Cross, Georgia
- Sandy Cross, Surrey
