= James Stuart =

James Stuart may refer to:

== Government and politics ==
- James VI and I (1566–1625), James VI of Scotland and James I of England
- James II of England (1633–1701), James VII of Scotland
- James Fitz-James Stuart, 2nd Duke of Berwick (1696–1738), Jacobite and Spanish nobleman
- James Fitz-James Stuart, 3rd Duke of Berwick (1718–1787), Jacobite
- James Francis Edward Stuart (1688–1766), "the Old Pretender", claimant to the thrones of England and Scotland
- James Stuart, Duke of Cambridge (1663–1667), second son of the Duke of York and his first wife, Anne Hyde
- James Stuart (1681–1743) (died 1743), British Army officer, courtier and politician, Member of Parliament (MP) for Ayr Burghs 1734–41
- James Stuart (1774–1833), British businessman and politician, director of The East India Company, MP for Huntingdon 1824–31
- James Stuart (1775–1849), Scottish politician
- James Stuart-Wortley (Conservative politician) (1805–1881), British Conservative Party politician
- James Stuart-Wortley (New Zealand politician) (1833–1870)
- James Stuart-Wortley-Mackenzie (1747–1818), soldier and Member of Parliament (MP) 1768–96
- James Stuart-Wortley, 1st Baron Wharncliffe (1776–1845)
- James Stuart, 1st Viscount Stuart of Findhorn (1897–1971), Conservative Party politician and Secretary of State for Scotland
- Sir James Stuart, 1st Baronet (1780–1853), Lower Canada lawyer, politician, judge
- Sir James Stuart of Binend (1716–1777), Scottish merchant and lord provost of Edinburgh

Several Earls of Moray, including:

- James Stewart, 1st Earl of Moray (1501 creation) (died 1544), illegitimate son of James IV of Scotland and Janet Kennedy
- James Stewart, 1st Earl of Moray (c. 1531–1570), member of the House of Stewart as the illegitimate son of King James V
- James Stuart, 3rd Earl of Moray (died 1638), son of James Stewart, 2nd Earl of Moray and Elizabeth Stuart, 2nd Countess of Moray
- James Stuart, 4th Earl of Moray (1611–1653), son of James Stuart, 3rd Earl of Moray and Lady Anne Gordon
- James Stuart, 8th Earl of Moray (1708–1767), son of Francis Stuart, 7th Earl of Moray

and several Earls of Bute and their predecessors, including:

- James Stuart, 1st Earl of Bute (died 1710), Scottish soldier, judge, and politician
- James Stuart, 2nd Earl of Bute (died 1723), son of James Stuart, 1st Earl of Bute and Agnes Mackenzie

== Military ==
- James Stuart (British Army officer, born 1741) (1741–1815), British general in North America and India
- James Stuart (British Army officer, died 1793), British general of the East India Company
- James Ewell Brown Stuart (1833–1864), Confederate States military officer in the American Civil War
- Hermanus Loots (1936–2016), South African commissar known in uMkhonto we Sizwe as James Stuart

== Others ==
- James Stuart (cleric) (1701–1789), translator into Scottish Gaelic of the New Testament
- James Stuart (linguist) (1868–1942), civil servant in the Colony of Natal and Zulu linguist
- James Stuart (opera director) (1928–2005), American tenor and opera director
- James Stuart (rugby league) (born 1988), Australian rugby league player
- James Stuart (educator) (1843–1913), professor of mechanism and applied mechanics at Cambridge University and Liberal Party politician
- James "Athenian" Stuart (1713–1788), archaeologist and architect
- James Stuart (artist) (1802–1842), quarantine officer, naturalist, and artist
- Jim Stuart (1919–1985), American football player
- James Gibb Stuart (1920–2013), financial author
- James Patrick Stuart (born 1968), American film and television actor
- James Reeve Stuart (1834-1915), American artist and Confederate soldier

== See also ==
- James Stewart (disambiguation)
- James Steuart (disambiguation)
- Jamie Stuart (born 1976), English footballer
- Jamie Stewart (disambiguation)
