= David Dane =

British pathologist and clinical virologist

- Born: David Maurice Surrey Dane; 25 March 1923
- Died: 9 April 1998 (aged 75); Puttenham, Surrey
- Education: Charterhouse School; Clare College, Cambridge; St Thomas' Hospital
- Scientific career
- Fields: Pathology; Virology
- Workplaces: Queen's University Belfast; Middlesex Hospital Medical School

David Maurice Surrey Dane, MRCS CRCP MB Bchir MRCP MRCPath FRCPath FRCP (25 March 1923 – 9 April 1998) was a British pathologist and clinical virologist known for his pioneering work in infectious diseases including poliomyelitis and the early investigations into the efficacy of a number of vaccines. He is particularly remembered for his strategic foresight in the field of blood transfusion microbiology, particularly in relation to diseases that are spread through blood transfusion.

Through his research, Dane was instrumental in developing and producing robust and sensitive reagents for the screening of blood donors in the UK blood transfusion services. This greatly reduced the risk of post-transfusion hepatitis. Dane’s interest in developments in transfusion microbiology enabled him to advise on important public health decisions from the 1960s right up until his death in 1998.

During the later part of his professional career he and his Department of Virology at the Middlesex Hospital Medical School were renowned for diagnostic precision irrespective of whether this involved dated technology, for example immunodiffusion (ID) or complement fixation tests (CFT), or state-of-the-art technology including radioimmunoassay (RIA) and electron microscopy (EM). Whatever investigations were carried out were expected to be precise, accurate, reproducible and of clinical relevance.

== Early life ==
David Maurice Surrey Dane was the son of William Surrey Dane (1892–1978), C.B.E., M.C., vice-chairman and managerial consultant of Odhams Press and chairman/ president of several hospital boards, including Great Ormond Street Hospital (1957–67), chairman of the Daily Herald newspaper (1949–60), and a member of the General Advisory Council of the BBC (1956–62), and his wife Dorothy Mary, daughter of Rev. William Alexander Armstrong, M.A. (Cantab.), vicar of West Dean, near Chichester; her brother was the artist John Armstrong.

Dane attended Charterhouse School. He was admitted to Clare College, Cambridge, however, he volunteered instead to join the Army. In 1941, after enlisting as a private, Dane was selected for officer training. He joined the Parachute Regiment in 1943, and then the newly formed Special Air Service (SAS). In July 1944, he was parachuted into France as part of Operation Bulbasket.

He returned to the UK to read Natural Sciences at Clare College, Cambridge and later undertook his clinical medical training at St Thomas' Hospital, London.

== Career ==
=== Move to Australia ===
Dane joined the Institute of Medical and Veterinary Science, Adelaide, in 1951 supported by a grant from National Health and the Medical Research Council. He was instrumental in an extensive investigation of an undiagnosed outbreak of acute meningitis and isolated a potential cause. It was inevitable that as a field virologist he would also become involved in the avian/human zoonosis of psittacosis work led by John Miles, head of the Medical Research Division in the early 1950s. Dane continued to work to improve diagnostic methods and published on avian and human psittacosis.

=== Return to the UK ===
On returning to the UK, in 1955, Dane was appointed lecturer in microbiology at Queen's University Belfast, where he worked with Professor George Dick on the recently developed attenuate and killed poliovirus vaccines. Through their research they established that the early live polio vaccines developed by Hilary Koprowski were unsafe because they could return to virulence when excreted by people given the vaccine. Professor Dick’s team also initiated studies of combined diphtheria/pertussis/tetanus vaccines.

=== London ===
In 1966, Dane left Belfast to become the head of the Virology Department, Bland Sutton School of Pathology at the Middlesex Hospital Medical School, London. At that time this was one of the very few medical schools to have an electron microscope, donated by Polio charities in recognition of his work in this field. Very much in character, he developed productive collaborations with senior colleagues within the medical school and hospital. Together with Dr Duncan Catterall, head of the sexually transmitted disease clinic in James Pringle House at Middlesex Hospital, Dane quickly demonstrated the usefulness of the electron microscope for the rapid diagnosis of herpes simplex virus infection (HSV). Close collaborations with two senior colleagues in the haematology field, James Wallace "Jimmie" Stewart, Professor of Haematology at the Middlesex Hospital Medical School (MHMS), and Tom Cleghorn, director of the North London Blood Transfusion Centre (NLBTC) at Edgware led to ground-breaking work in the emerging field of transfusion transmitted infection and particularly that of post-transfusion hepatitis.

== The hepatitis B virus particle ==
With his colleagues Colin "Sam" Cameron and Moya Briggs he was, in 1970, the first to describe the virus responsible for hepatitis B (HBV). His application of electron microscopy (EM) to examine plasma from donors implicated in long incubation post-transfusion hepatitis led to identification of the morphological form of the hepatitis: he characterised the particles in the blood of patients with "serum hepatitis", as hepatitis B was then known. This 42 nm particle is known now eponymously as the Dane particle. Those who trained with him recall with wry amusement the irritation if he was to hear anyone referring to the 42 nm form by its eponymous title, even if abbreviated to "DP".

=== Transfusion microbiology ===
Dane's determination to improve the accuracy of detecting the hepatitis B surface antigen protein, HBsAg, and his keen interest in blood transfusion led him to accept an honorary consultancy at NLBTC which he continued to hold after his retirement in 1982, until his death. Through this association with the blood services Dane went on both to improve current assays and to develop more sensitive screening methods. A close collaboration with Ian Cayzer in Wellcome Diagnostics produced the haemagglutination assay for HBsAg, "Hepatest". Turkey red blood cells, coated with antibody to HBsAg agglutinate (clump together) in the presence of HBsAg, a sensitive test which was widely used diagnostically. Not content with that, he and his laboratory colleagues produced in collaboration with Brian Combridge at the Blood Products Laboratory the first UK-based RIA for HBsAg, the BPL RIA. They also developed specialised equipment for its use. His colleague Sam Cameron produced the iodinated label and with John Barabara of NLBTC, merged this with microplate technology and multichannel gamma counters. Methods for selecting high-titre antimicrobial antibodies in donors, investigation and surveillance of post transfusion infections became established routine activities.

=== Sexual transmission of HBV ===
Dane identified sexual transmission of the hepatitis B and the role of the persistently infected person as a reservoir of infection in the community, identifying the individual whose plasma contained large amounts of virus, coining the term "super-carriers". He also described the dynamics of the virus particle in acute infection.

== Implications of HIV for blood transfusion practice ==
=== Blood product manufacture ===
Dane was a strong advocate of self sufficiency for the manufacture of blood products in Britain from freely donated blood, rather than from imported blood from the US where donors were paid. The consequences of not following this advice, and Britain’s failure to be self-sufficient for treatment of haemophiliacs made the UK reliant upon importation of the then "new" treatment of factor VIII concentrate. Potentially disastrous for groups such as haemophiliacs, who early on became infected with HIV, his advice to James Wallace "Jimmie" Stewart to reserve concentrate use to those whose management absolutely depended on it saved many from HIV infection. He also was early to recognise the occurrence of hepatitis other than hepatitis A and B following treatment with the anti-haemophiliac concentrate.

=== Expert witness ===
Dane retired in 1982, just before major rates of HIV infection emerged. He continued as an advisor after retirement, including offering pro bono advice against the importation of blood from the USA. In the 1990s he advised in legal cases relating to haemophiliacs’ treatment with contaminated blood, and on other matters. He remained resolutely opposed to the trend among research scientists to seek commercial gain from their discoveries by patenting them.

=== His legacy ===
After his retirement Dane did not to return the Middlesex Hospital Medical School. However his legacy of pushing diagnostic development and collaboration with the diagnostic industry continued with Middlesex Hospital Medical School, Virology developing the first UK HIV diagnostic assay, the Wellcozyme HIV test which led to the Wellcome Research Laboratories receiving the Queen's Award for British Industry.

== Personal life ==
In 1955, Dane married Veronica (née Tester), widow of Maj. Iain Herford Hope (1918–1951); she had two children, Kerin and Alex. They had met in Australia. Together they had three children: Roland, Penelope and Thomas. Dane died in April 1998.
