= Jimmy Stewart (disambiguation) =

Jimmy Stewart (1908–1997) was an American actor and military officer.

Jimmy Stewart may also refer to:

== Politics ==
- James Stewart (Irish politician) (1934–2013), known as Jimmy Stewart, Irish communist activist
- Jimmy Stewart (politician) (born 1969), Ohio State Representative

== Sports ==
- Jimmy Stewart (racing driver) (1931–2008), Scottish Formula One driver
- Jimmy Stewart (baseball) (1939–2012), baseball player
- Jimmy Stewart (American football), former Southern Methodist University football coach

== Other ==
- Stewart Granger or Jimmy Stewart (1913–1993), English actor
- Jimmy Stewart (musician) (born 1937), American jazz guitarist
- Jimmy Stewart (meteorologist) (born 1941), KVOA chief meteorologist
- Jimmy G. Stewart (1942–1966), US Army Medal of Honor recipient, killed in action

== See also ==
- James Stewart (disambiguation)
- Jim Stewart (disambiguation)
- The Jimmy Stewart Show, a television series starring Jimmy Stewart
- The Jimmy Stewart Museum, a museum dedicated to Jimmy Stewart
