= William Frederick Faviell =

William Frederick Faviell (1822 – 3 July 1902) was a British railway constructor. He constructed the first railway in India and later built railways in Ceylon and South Africa.

== Biography ==
Faviell was born in 1822 in Yorkshire. Son of a builder of bridges and canals, he began to work as a railway engineer on the Great Eastern Railway in Colchester with two of his brothers. Later, he decided to move his interests overseas and built railways in India, Ceylon and South Africa. Back in England, he bought the estate of Down Place in the Surrey where he lived with his wife Sarah and their six children until 1890. There, he decided to create one of the first Model Farm of the South of England at Blackwell Farm. He employed Henry Peak to design the new building. He died on 3 July 1902 at Tunbridge Wells.

== Work ==
=== India ===
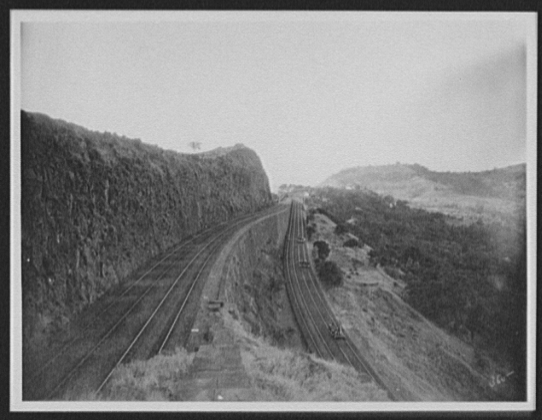
Bhor Ghat incline of the Great Indian Peninsula Railway

In 1850, Faviell obtained the contract to build the first section of railway in India. Although the idea came in 1843 from the chief engineer of the Bombay Government G. T. Clark, the construction of the 15.75-mile route began 7 years after under the direction of Faviell. It connected Bombay with Thane, Kalyan and with the Thal and Bhor Ghat inclines. Given the topography of the area on the crest of the Western Ghat mountain ranges, about 42,000 workers had to travel 15–20 miles each day carrying an estimated 6,296,061 cubic yards of earthwork on their heads. The low wages and the working conditions resulted in a riot in January 1859. Europeans were attacked by the Indian workforce with sticks and stones. Finally, Faviell gave up his contract in 1859 and was replaced by Solomon Tredwell.

=== Ceylon ===
In 1863, Faviell began a new project of railway from Colombo through the hills of Kandy. In spite of the difficult geographical condition, the construction of the 73-mile route was a success when it was finished four years later.

=== South Africa ===
His last foreign contract was in South Africa in 1877, where he undertook to extend the Port Elizabeth railway, then only 67 miles long, into the interior in the direction of Cradock and Graaff-Reinet.
