= Roland Dane =

Irish-Australian automotive businessman

- Born: October 17, 1956 (age 69); Belfast, Northern Ireland
- Occupation: Businessman
- Children: Jessica Dane; Ali Surrey Dane
- Father: David Dane

Roland William Surrey Dane (born 17 October 1956) is an Irish-Australian automotive businessman who is best known for co-founding motorsport teams Triple Eight Racing in England and Triple Eight Race Engineering in Australia, of which he was team principal until the end of 2021.

== Career ==
=== United Kingdom ===
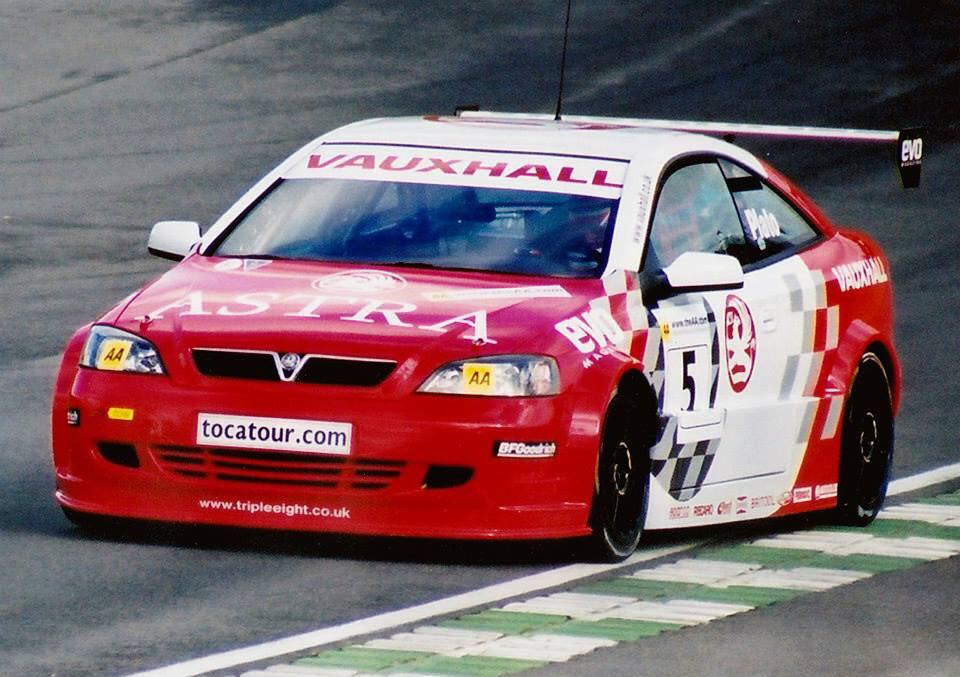
Triple Eight Race Engineering Vauxhall Astra at Brands Hatch in 2001

Dane is the son of David Dane, a leading British pathologist and clinical virologist. Dane started his career at automotive manufacturer Panther Westwinds as an apprentice in 1975 and then working in various roles including as a sales executive before his departure from the company in 1984. In 1986, Dane founded car dealership Park Lane Limited, based in London, that now focuses on selling luxury cars across the British Isles and Asia Pacific.

In partnership with racing driver Derek Warwick, Dane founded the Park Lane Racing team in 1991, and they competed in the British Touring Car Championship (BTCC) in 1992 and 1993. Dane, Warwick and Ian Harrison then founded Triple Eight Race Engineering in late 1996, with the team becoming six-times series champions as the works Vauxhall team from 1997 until Vauxhall left the category in 2009. The team, which later took on manufacturer support from MG, ceased trading in 2018.

By 2002, Dane and Warwick had sold their share in the team and Dane moved to Australia. As part of its British operations, Triple Eight Racing had already competed in two events in Australia in the late 1990s; the 1997 and 1998 Bathurst 1000 races which were run to Super Touring regulations and open to BTCC entrants for the only time. Alongside co-owner Warwick, the team hired local Holden drivers, a sister General Motors company to Vauxhall, across the two years, including nine-time event winner Peter Brock in 1997. The team's second entry in 1998 was also re-branded as a Holden.

=== Australia ===
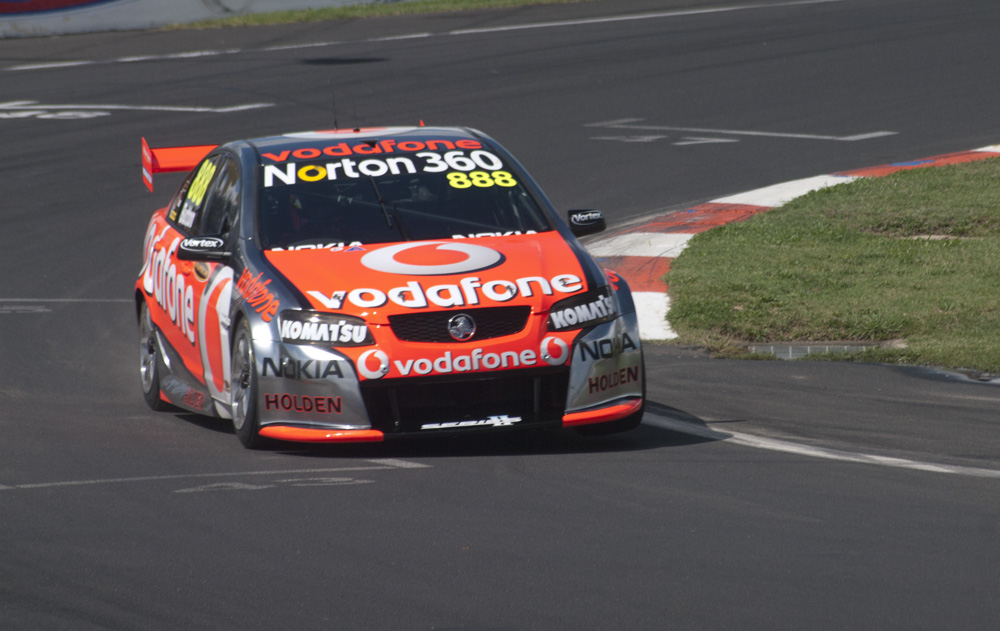
Triple Eight Race Engineering Holden Commodore VE at Mount Panorama in 2011

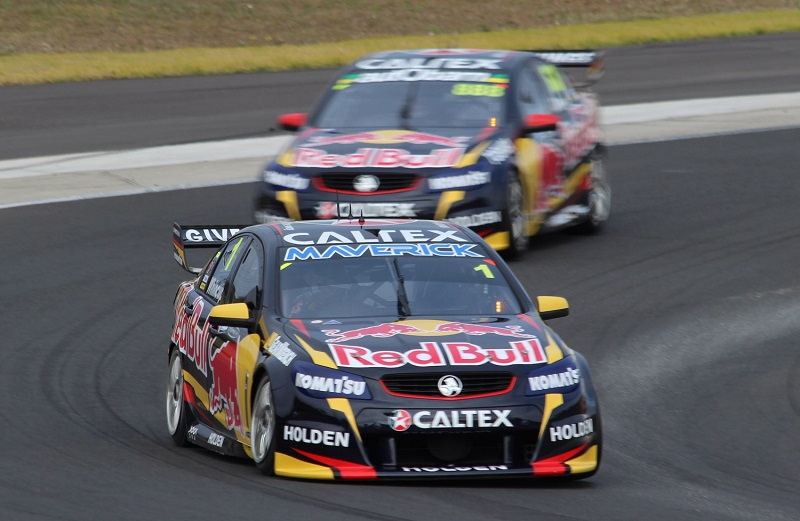
Triple Eight Race Engineering Holden Commodore VFs at Eastern Creek Raceway in 2014

In 2003, after initial discussions to buy the Holden Racing Team, following the collapse of Tom Walkinshaw Racing, were aborted, Dane, Warwick, Harrison and Peter Butterly purchased V8 Supercars team Briggs Motor Sport. The team was rebranded as Triple Eight Race Engineering.

Craig Lowndes won the team its first race in 2005 and went on to win three consecutive Bathurst 1000s from 2006 to 2008 with Jamie Whincup. Whincup also won the championship in 2008 and 2009 for Ford before Dane brokered a manufacturer switch to Holden after Ford withdrew funding for 2010. In the 2010s, the team won six further championships, five of them Whincup's, and four Bathurst 1000s. From 2016 onwards, the team also became the factory Holden team in the category.

During this time, Dane held a position on the Supercars Board of Directors for 12 out of 14 years between 2004 and 2017. By 2014, Dane had become majority owner of the team, with Harrison holding a minority stake. In 2015, Dane then sold a minority stake to Paul Dumbrell, Tim Miles and Trinette Schipkie while Jamie Whincup and Dane's daughter Jessica became part-owners in 2018, replacing Schipkie. In 2016, Dane became an Australian citizen.

Dane became a director of PWR Advance Cooling Technology in 2017, and chairman in 2023. He retired in August 2025.

In February 2021, Dane announced that he would step down from his roles at Triple Eight at the end of the year, to be replaced by Whincup who announced his retirement from full time driving. Dane's ownership stake in the team also reduced to 11%. Dane sold his remaining Triple Eight stake to Whincup in December 2021. Dane remained at Triple Eight as chairman until December 2024. He retained ownership of the team's workshop in Banyo until selling it to Triple Eight in May 2025.

After working as a consultant to General Motors Specialty Vehicles in 2025, Dane will return to the Supercars Championship as team principal for PremiAir Racing in 2026.
