= 667th Heavy Anti-Aircraft Regiment, Royal Artillery (Hampshire) TA =

667th Heavy Anti-Aircraft Regiment, Royal Artillery (Hampshire) (TA)
- Cap Badge of the Royal Artillery (pre-1953)
- Active: 1 January 1947–1 January 1954
- Country: United Kingdom
- Branch: Territorial Army
- Role: Air Defence
- Size: Regiment
- Garrison/HQ: Aldershot, Hampshire
- Engagements: None

Commanders
- Notable commanders: Lt-Col Howard N. Cole

667th Heavy Anti-Aircraft Regiment, Royal Artillery (Hampshire) TA was a volunteer air defence unit of Britain's Territorial Army from 1947 until 1954.

== History ==
The regiment was raised when the Territorial Army (TA) was reconstituted in 1947. It was designated 667 HAA Regiment RA (Hampshire) TA with headquarters at Aldershot and equipped with 3.7-inch Anti-Aircraft Guns. It was Aldershot's first, and only, Territorial Army Artillery Regiment. It was raised and commanded from 1947 to 1951 by Lt-Col Howard N. Cole OBE TD. The headquarters of the unit were at one of Aldershot's old cavalry barracks, Beaumont Barracks.

It formed part of 100 Army Group Royal Artillery (AA) (TA) supporting the field army units of the TA (it was therefore not part of Anti-Aircraft Command). 100 AGRA (AA) began to disband on 9 September 1948, completed by 27 September.

667 HAA Regiment was itself disbanded on 1 January 1954.

== External sources ==
- British Army units from 1945 on
- British Military History
- Graham Watson, The Territorial Army 1947
