= Gale & Polden =

Printer and postcard publisher based in England

Gale & Polden's Aldershot works decorated for the Coronation of Queen Elizabeth II in 1953

Gale & Polden was a British printer and publisher. Founded in Brompton, near Chatham, Kent in 1868, the business subsequently moved to Aldershot, where it was based until its closure in November 1981 after the company had been bought by media mogul Robert Maxwell.

== Early years ==
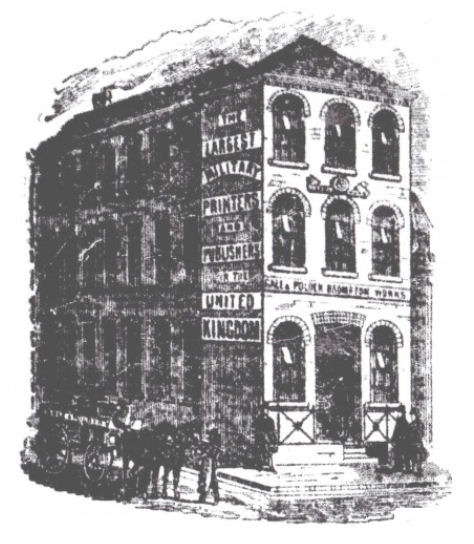
Premises of Gale & Polden in Brompton

The firm of Gale & Polden was founded near Brompton Barracks at Chatham, James Gale opening his bookshop there at No 1 High Street, Old Brompton in 1868. Soon Gale acquired his first printing press, which he set up in a wooden shed in the garden at the rear of his house. Through his contacts with the headquarters of the Chatham Military District Gale obtained a printing contract for the printing of the Garrison Directory.

In 1873 Gale printed and published his first book, Campaign of 1870–1: The Operations of the Corps of General V. Werder by Ludwig Lohlein, late Captain 1st Baden Bodyguard Grenadier Regiment. At this time Gale's printing works had three hand presses and only enough metal type to print sixteen pages at a time. Gale's staff was made up of three compositors, a bookbinder, a die stamper and three boys. His wife managed the shop's book and stationery sales, assisted by one of the boys.

Composing department at Gale & Polden's Wellington Works in Aldershot c.1915

On 29 September 1875 James Gale took on his first apprentice, William T. Nash, aged fourteen. Nash went on to work for the company for sixty-eight years, rising to be composing room overseer, a post he held for nearly forty years until 1943 when he died aged 82. In 1875 Nash was joined by Thomas Ernest Polden, aged 16. By 1880 the bookselling side of Gale's business was very successful, and Gale publicised it by announcing that "A selection of several hundreds of most modern and popular books will always be found in stock and, having made arrangements for receiving parcels from the principal London Houses daily, the book that should not happen to be in stock could be obtained immediately".

Many of these developments were due to T. Ernest Polden, who had progressed from serving in the bookshop into working in the printing works, where he gained an extensive knowledge of different printing processes. Polden went out from Chatham to the garrisons or dockyards at Gravesend, Dover, Canterbury and further afield, publicising the name Gale & Polden to the British Army and Navy. At that time most official military forms were written out in longhand by orderlies, and Polden saw an opportunity to extend the firm's business by printing standardised forms. His scheme resulted in large orders for the forms being placed.

== Expansion ==
Large letterpress machines at work at Gale & Polden in Aldershot preparing the text for the printing presses c.1915

Small printing machines inside Gale & Polden's Wellington Works in Aldershot c.1915

Polden, by now the senior partner in the business, decided to establish a London office. "A Company of our standing and associations", he declared "must have its centre in the hub of the Empire!" The business had increased to such an extent that James Gale and T. Ernest Polden were considering forming Gale & Polden into a limited liability company registered in London.

At that time Fleet Street, St Paul's Churchyard and Paternoster Row were the centre of publishing in London, and it was here that T. Ernest Polden looked for an office for the growing company. In 1892 he found suitable premises at No. 2, Amen Corner. At first the company had two rooms on the third floor, but this soon increased to four and gradually they took over the entire building. By this time the company was supplying printed forms and other stationery to about 400 military canteens, 100 officers' messes, 200 sergeants' messes, and 250 libraries, recreation rooms and regimental institutes throughout both the Army and Navy. The well-known Gale & Polden Military Series and other educational works were in use by Military Educational Department and by the London and other school boards, and in the colonial forces. On 10 November 1892 the company was incorporated as Gale & Polden Ltd, with a share capital of £30,000 in £5 shares. Unusually, the shares were offered to ordinary soldiers.

== Move to Aldershot ==
Polden suggested to the board of directors that it was necessary to build a new factory at Aldershot, then the largest British Army base in Great Britain, and close the Brompton Works. Polden had located a suitable site in Aldershot for the building of the new factory in an ideal position near to the town's railway station. It was originally planned to have a four-sided building with a central courtyard. By September 1893 the first wing was complete, and two high-powered gas engines with electrical generating plant were installed. The larger printing machines were kept running at the Brompton Works until the new building at Aldershot was ready to receive them. Then the machines at Brompton were stripped down, loaded into Pickfords containers on horse-drawn drays, taken down to the railway goods siding at Chatham Station and sent to Aldershot in special trucks where they were unloaded and taken across to the new factory nearby.

== Later years ==
Men of the Aldershot Volunteer Fire Brigade fight the blaze at Gale and Polden in 1918

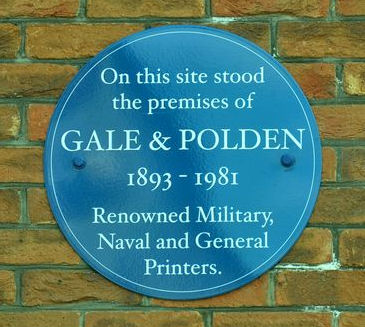
The blue plaque on the former site of Gale and Polden

In 1916 Gale & Polden were granted a Royal Warrant for producing Queen Mary's Christmas card. In 1918 a fire at the firm's Wellington Works destroyed one of the building's four wings, which temporarily halted printing. As a result of the fire, the company decided to maintain its own volunteer fire crew at the Works. In 1956 Gale & Polden acquired a number of smaller printing firms including Know Publications, producers of the Woking Opinion newspaper; Paines of Worthing and John Drew Ltd, an Aldershot-based rival. In 1963 Gale & Polden was taken over by the Purnell Group, and in 1964 Purnells merged with another printing company, Hazel Sun, to form the new British Printing Corporation (BPC), the largest printing company in Europe.

In 1971 The Aldershot News was acquired by the Surrey Advertiser Group, which later became part of the Guardian Group of newspapers. Robert Maxwell gained control of BPC and Gale & Polden with it in 1981, and named his new Company Maxwell Communications. In November 1981 Gale & Polden finally closed, with the Wellington Works site being demolished in 1987. Robert Maxwell died in 1991 and in 1992 Maxwell Communications collapsed, leaving many retired Gale and Polden employees without a pension.

On 6 June 2014 a commemorative blue plaque was unveiled on the block of flats which now stands on the site of the former print works. This was sponsored by Colonel David Strong TD, a local resident and a Gale and Polden historian.

David Strong's book The Story of Gale & Polden 1866–1981 was published in 2017.

== Gallery ==
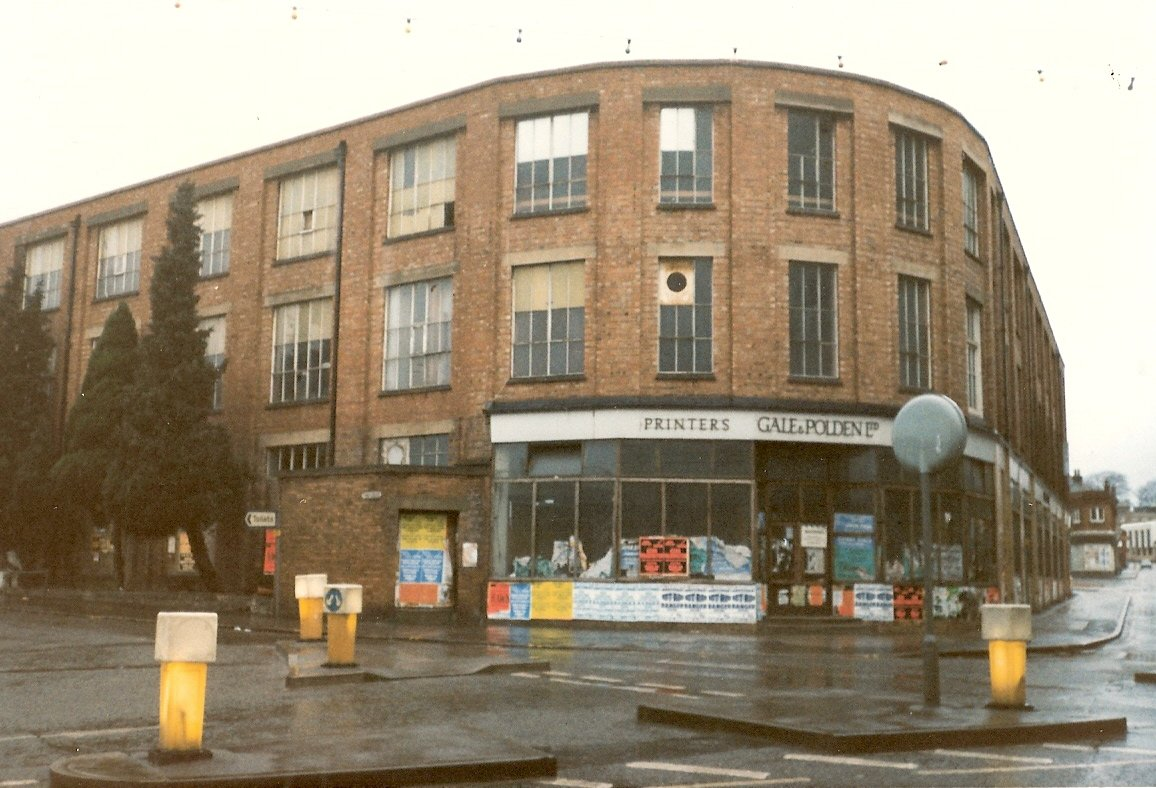
Gale and Polden just before demolition

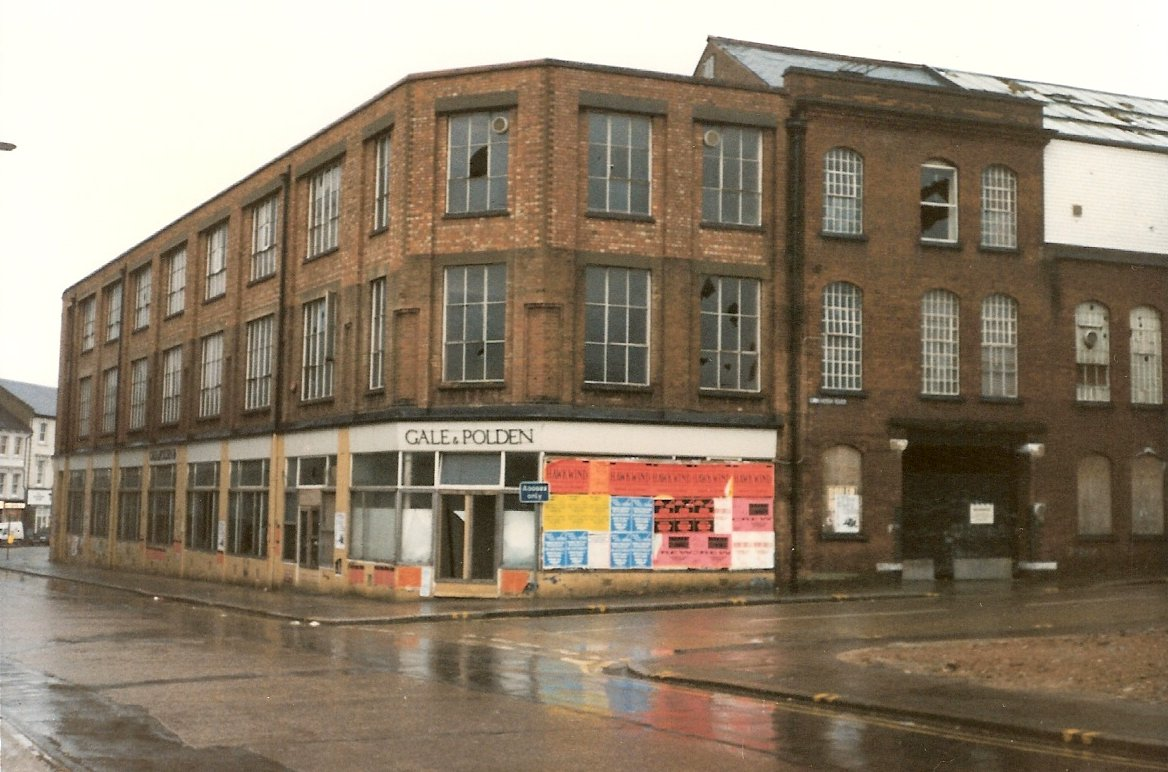
Side view just before demolition

== Sources ==
- Research and unpublished manuscript of Howard N. Cole, who worked for the company for thirteen years.
- Harrington, Peter (2001). British Army Uniforms in Color as illustrated by John McNeill, Ernest Ibbetson, Edgar A. Holloway and Harry Payne, c. 1908–1919. Atglen, PA: Schiffer.
