= Howard N. Cole =

World War II Serving Officer in British Army

Howard N. Cole OBE TD F.R.Hist.S DL
- Howard Norman Cole
- Born: 22 March 1911
- Died: 3 May 1983 (aged 72)
- Military career
- Allegiance: United Kingdom
- Branch: British Army
- Rank: Lieutenant-Colonel
- Unit: 11th (Honourable Artillery Company and City of London Yeomanry) Brigade
- Commands: 667th Heavy Anti-Aircraft Regiment, Royal Artillery (Hampshire) TA
- Conflicts: Second World War
- Other work: Author and historian Deputy Lieutenant of the County of Hampshire

Lieutenant-Colonel Howard Norman Cole (22 March 1911 – 3 May 1983) OBE TD F.R.Hist.S DL was a serving officer in the British Army during the Second World War and was an author of books on military subjects.

== Life ==
Cole was born in Peckham in London in 1911, the son of Howard Norman Cole, a Works Manager for Diatomite, and Mabel Alice Cole.

A writer, historian and lecturer, Cole was the Deputy Lieutenant of the County of Hampshire from 1965 to 1983, the Honorary Remembrancer for the Borough of Aldershot from 1963 to 1974, and Curator of the Aldershot Local History Collection.

Cole first visited Aldershot in 1930 while serving in the 11th (Honourable Artillery Company and City of London Yeomanry) Brigade, part of the Territorial Army. A Lance Bombardier, Cole was commissioned a Second Lieutenant in the Territorials on 20 July 1935. With the outbreak of the Second World War, and after serving time at Royal Military Academy Sandhurst in 1942, he was promoted to the rank of Major. He was awarded an OBE in 1945 for services in north west Europe during the Second World War. Cole returned to Aldershot in March 1946 where he was employed by publishers Gale and Polden as military sales manager for more than thirteen years. There he raised and commanded the 667th Heavy Anti-Aircraft Regiment, Royal Artillery (Hampshire) TA from 1947 to 1951.

In 1954 Cole provided the commentary for The Military Centenary of Aldershot, part 1 & part 2, a film produced by Aldershot Borough Council celebrating the Centenary of its association with the British Army.

Cole was appointed an Officer of the Most Venerable Order of the Hospital of St. John of Jerusalem in 1953, and a Commander in 1974. He lived in The Yayldens on Manor Road in Tongham in Surrey.

'Howard N. Cole Way', a street on the site of the former South Cavalry Barracks in Aldershot, was named in his honour in 1979. His collection of memorabilia and pictures of early Aldershot Military Town were donated to Aldershot Military Museum on his death in 1983.

== Publications ==
- Coronation and Commemorative Medals 1887–1953 Gale & Polden, Aldershot (1953)
- Coronation and Royal Commemorative Medals 1877–1977 J B Hayward & Son (1977)
- Heraldry in War: Formation Badges, 1939–1945 The Wellington Press (1946)
- Badges on Battledress: Post-War Formation Signs and Rank and Regimental Badges Gale & Polden Aldershot (1953)
- Formation Badges of World War Two: Britain, Commonwealth and Empire Arms & Armour (1985) ISBN 0-85368-078-7
- The Story of Aldershot: a History of the Civil and Military Towns Gale & Polden, Aldershot (1951)
- The Story of Catterick Camp 1915–1972 Headquarters Catterick Garrison (1972)
- Minden 1759 (Battles for Wargamers) Charles Knight, London (1972)
- NAAFI in Uniform Forces Press (1982)
- The Origins of Military Aldershot Aldershot Golden Jubilee Committee (1972)
- The Story of Bisley Gale & Polden, Aldershot (1960)
- A Surrey Village and its Church: The Story of Tongham
- On Wings of Healing: The Story of the Airborne Medical Services 1940–60 william Blackwood and Sons, London and Edinburgh (1963)
