= Tongham =

Village and parish in Surrey, England

Coordinates: 51°14′13″N 0°43′55″W

- Village
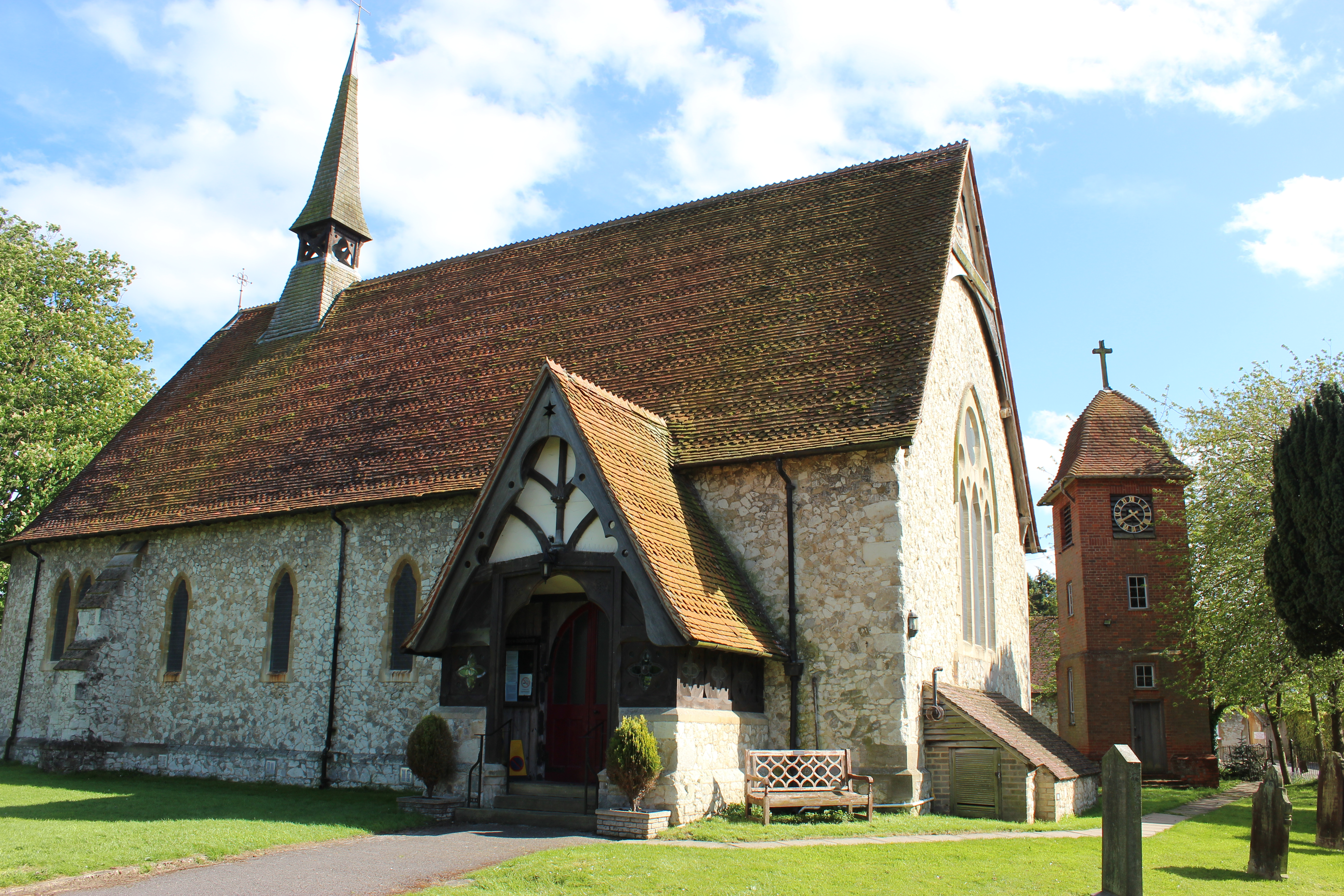
- The 19th-century church of St Paul is the only one in Surrey to have a separate belfry

- Location within Surrey
- Area: 3.3 km^{2} (1.3 sq mi)
- Population: 2,314 (Civil Parish)
  - Density: 701/km^{2} (1,820/sq mi)
- OS grid reference: SU8849
- Civil parish: Tongham
- District: Guildford
- Shire county: Surrey
- Region: South East
- Country: England
- Sovereign state: United Kingdom
- Post town: Farnham
- Postcode district: GU10
- Dialling code: 01252
- Police: Surrey
- Fire: Surrey
- Ambulance: South East Coast
- UK Parliament: Godalming and Ash

Tongham is a village northeast of the town of Farnham in Surrey, England. The village's buildings occupy most of the west of the civil parish, adjoining the A31 and the A331. The boundaries take in Poyle Park in the east and the replacement to Runfold's manor house in the west.

Tongham is located on the north side of the Hog's Back, the narrowest part of the North Downs. The largest independent brewery in Surrey, the Hogs Back Brewery, takes its name from this eminence as does the Hog's Back Hotel. Tongham was the home of the Aldershot Stadium from 1950 to 1992. Aldershot itself is 1.5 miles (2.4 km) to the west.

== History and economy ==
Archaeological evidence suggests the area of Tongham has been occupied since Neolithic times, particularly close to the Pilgrims' Way which formerly covered in part the top of the Hogs Back, a ridge 50–60 m (160–200 ft) above the surrounding area, but which is now the North Downs Way on the south side. Notable finds in the parish include two Neolithic arrowheads and Iron Age farmsteads.

=== Manor ===
The farmstead, and what few peasants' buildings there were, gain early mentions as Twangham from the 13th century to the 16th century in the rent rolls of successive Bishops of Winchester: Henry de la Poyle held court at Tongham manor in 1360. He had inherited the land from his grandfather, Walter de la Puille who held it rendering an annual small fee to the Bishop.

The manor descended from the emblazoned, but not noble, Gaynesford and White families to holders in the Tichborne family. The family sold it in 1725 to a Richard Smith. In 1819 an exact namesake, with Thomas and Jane Barrett also having an interest, sold the manor to Stephen Boyce. On his death it passed to his stepson, Charles Barron, and the manor remained, albeit with portions gradually being sold off, with a Barron until at least 1906.

=== Poyle Park ===
The manor of Poyle Park which decayed from a wealthy gentleman's architecturally impressive farmhouse into no more than a farm, was in the north of Seale but now forms most of the east of Tongham. In the 14th century Tongham, seemingly inclusive of this area, was assessed in the subsidy roll at £3 8s 5.5d. The Poyle family owned a synonymous manor in a parish of Guildford, held of the King. After the Gaynesford and Vyne families, the family of Sir Nicholas Woodroffe, Lord Mayor of London for 1579, held it until at least 1906, by passing to female-line descendants, the Chester family. In 1792 owner William Woodroffe (born Billinghurst) who was High Sheriff of Surrey for 1792 had his estate in bankruptcy (chancery) due to the expense of that office which he could not afford. Charles Edward Mangles, brother to Ross Donnelly Mangles, is recorded as occupying Poyle Park in the 1841 and 1851 Census Enumeration Books. The Grade II listed 17th century Poyle Cottage sits below the former manor. Poyle Farm is largely intact in terms of uninterrupted farmland.

=== From the industrial revolution onwards ===
From the population abstracts from 1811 until its evolution into a parish the settlement was a rural one large enough in size to be official classed as a statistically recordable hamlet. Tongham's now dismantled railway was important for transporting materials to build the new military camp of Aldershot from 1856 until 1870 and the row of shops developed from this line. The parish church was completed in 1865 and Tongham, which had previously been part of the parish of Seale, was made into a separate parish the following year.

The military author and Honorary Remembrancer for the Borough of Aldershot (1963 to 1974), and Curator of the Aldershot Museum, Howard N. Cole, lived in the village.

=== Hogs Back Brewery ===
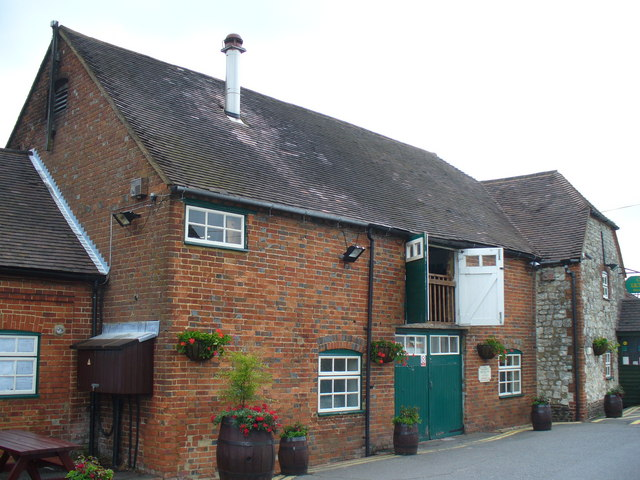
The Hogs Back Brewery is a major employer in the largely commuter village

Tongham is home to the largest independent brewer in Surrey, the Hogs Back Brewery (established 1992), which produces 3,800 barrels per year (2012 figures) from its large 18th-century premises. The brewery uses fuggles hops from the Hampton Park estate in Seale.

The Hogs Back Brewery complex is also home to other small businesses, including Terra Tempo Brewing, a gym and the Surrey Hills butchers.

== Amenities ==
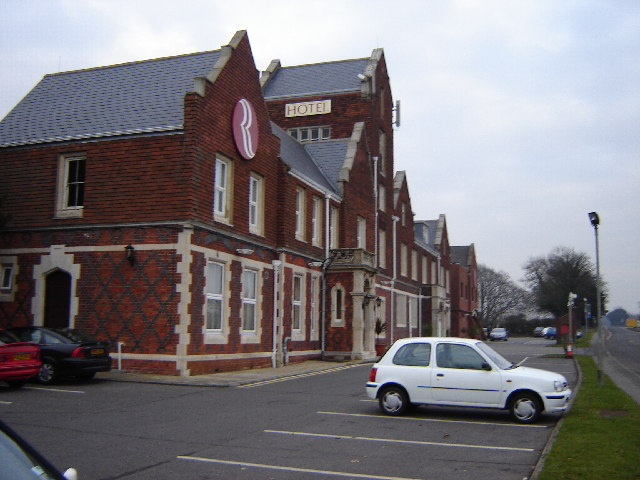
Hog's Back Hotel

The Hog's Back Hotel, now owned by Legacy Hotels, features white stone quoining and dutch gables giving its 20th-century structure a character reminiscent of the former manor house on the site.

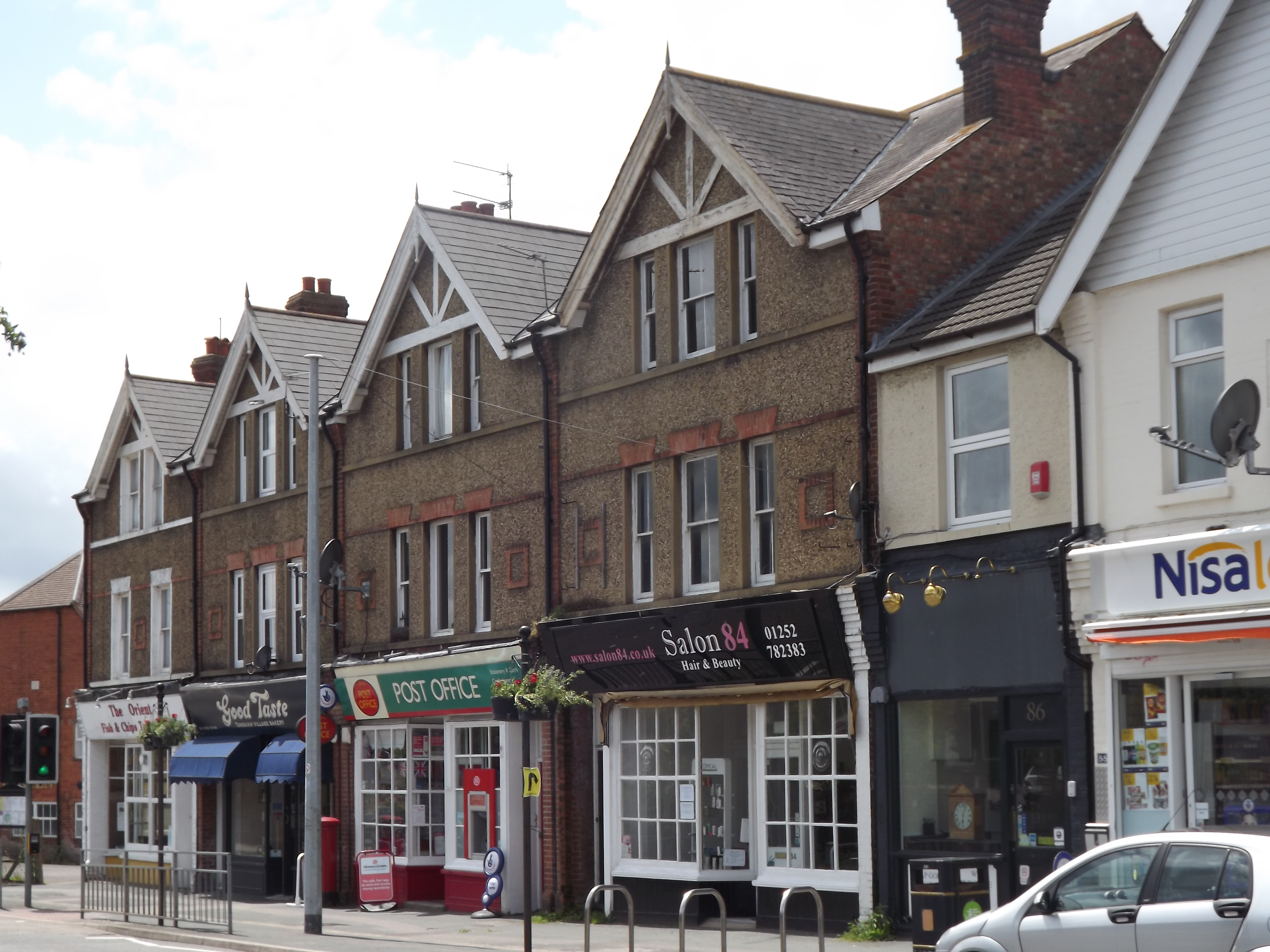
The shopping parade is centrally located

There are two pre-19th-century pubs in Tongham: The White Hart on The Street, and The Cricketers on Oxenden Road. There is a small shopping parade in the village centre. The brewery operates an off-licence stocking non-proprietorial ales as well as its own.

The 1865 Anglican church of St Paul, designed by Ewan Christian, is Grade II listed and was chiefly funded by John Back who owned Aldershot Park, a large public park with many leisure facilities accessible via a track from the village, crossing the double divide of a river valley (with the Blackwater Valley Path) and dual carriageway. Cyril Garbett, the son of its first vicar, and later Archbishop of York, was born in Tongham in 1875, a leader in the liturgy and charitable works of a large part of the Church of England.

== Sport and leisure ==
Tongham has a Non-League football club Tongham F.C. who play at Poyle Road.

According to the Guinness World Records 2003, Tongham also holds the world record for holding the most indisciplined Football Match ever against Hawley Youth Club on 3 November 1969. The referee booked all 22 players, including one who went to hospital and one of the linesman. The match, which was won by Tongham 2-0, was described by a participating player as a "good hard game".

=== Aldershot Stadium ===
Tongham was the home of Aldershot Stadium which hosted greyhound racing, stock car racing (and other short-oval motorsports), including speedway. The stadium lasted from 1950 until it was demolished for construction of the A331 road at the end of 1992.

== Demography and housing ==
2011 Census Homes
Output area	Detached	Semi-detached	Terraced	Flats and apartments	Caravans/temporary/ mobile homes	shared between households
(Civil Parish)	244	290	314	144	5	0

The average level of accommodation in the region composed of detached houses was 28%, the average for apartments was 22.6%.

2011 Census Key Statistics
Output area	Population	Households	% Owned outright	% Owned with a loan	hectares
(Civil Parish)	2,314	997	28.3%	44.5%	330

The proportion of households in the civil parish who owned their home outright compares to the regional average of 35.1%. The proportion who owned their home with a loan compares to the regional average of 32.5%. The remaining % is made up of rented dwellings (plus a negligible % of households living rent-free).

=== Commuter/local work statistics ===
As part of the outer London Commuter Belt, and well within the Aldershot Urban Area, the means of travel shows most people aged 16–74 either use a motor vehicle to work outside of the village or to commute within it.

2011 Census: Travel to work aged 16–74
Output area	Car or van	Not in paid work	Work mainly from home	Train	On foot	Bus
(Civil Parish)	1119	452	70	56	56	41
