= Blackwell Farm =

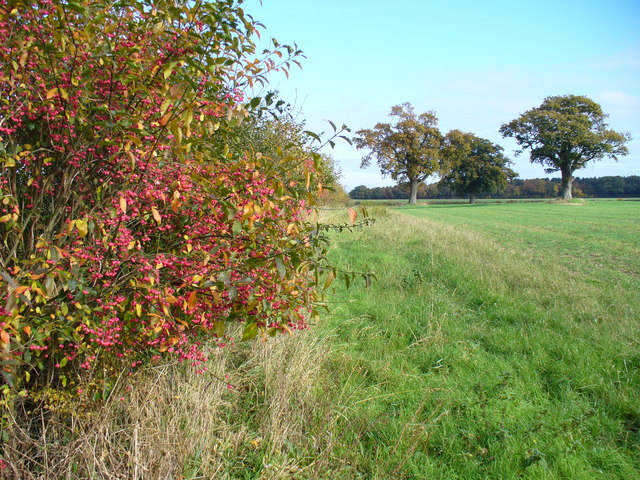
- West of Blackwell Farm

- Location in Surrey

General information
- Location: Surrey, England, UK
- Coordinates: 51.237215°N 0.626247°W

Blackwell Farm is the name of one of the estates situated on the Hog’s Back, on the West side of Guildford. Located in the parish of Compton, the historical farm is currently a controversial issue as part of the Guildford Borough Council’s Local Plan consultation.

== History ==
A farm already stood at Blackwell in the 17th century while the estate was included in the Down Place estate (also called Down Farm).

=== Notable owners ===
Bought by the railway engineer William Frederick Faviell in 1859, the area of Blackwell Farm was then 345 acres. Faviell decided to farm the land himself and hired Henry Peak to design his Model Farm in an industrial form unusual for this part of the country.

In 1905, the estate was 636 acres. It became the property of John Cawsey Dennis, co-founder of Dennis Specialist Vehicles, a vehicle manufacturer in Guildford.

=== The property during the Second World War ===
After 1940, the Royal Army Service Corps which trained at Aldershot occupied the building. Also used by the Canadian Army, the farm was finally converted into flats for wartime evacuees by the Guildford Rural District Council.

=== Aircraft crash ===
In 1952 a United States Air Force North American F-86 Sabre and a Royal Air Force Gloster Meteor collided at 25,000 ft over Guildford. The two Cold War jet fighters were exercising when the collision occurred. The Sabre had taken off from Soesterberg in the Netherlands and was simulating a Soviet bomber attacking London.

The Sabre crashed into a field of growing rye at Blackwell Farm about 150 yards from the nearest building and left a crater 30 feet in diameter. Capt. Milton Gray Whitford, the pilot, ejected from his aircraft before the crash and landed in the garden of a house in Ripley with only cuts on his face.

== Recent controversies ==
Bought in 1986 by the University of Surrey to become the residence of the Vice-Chancellor, the estate of Blackwell Farm is now a controversial topic since its owner has announced its plan to build approximately 2,000 new homes on the green belt land.

As part of the Guildford Borough Council’s Local Plan, the university has submitted its idea for a “Garden Neighbourhood” in the west of Guildford. The proposal includes a railway station and a park-and-ride along with new houses.

It has been criticized by local residents such as the Save Hogs Back campaigners who see the development plan like a threat for the Hog’s Back given the southern part of the site is designated as an Area of Outstanding Natural Beauty.
