= Jim Stewart (footballer, born 1888) =

Australian rules footballer

Personal information
- Full name: James Alexander Stewart
- Born: 2 November 1888; Guildford, Victoria
- Died: 23 September 1939 (aged 50); Malvern, Victoria
- Original team: Hawthorn (MJFA)

Playing career^{1}
Years	Club	Games (Goals)
1909, 1911	St Kilda	3 (1)
- ^{1} Playing statistics correct to the end of 1911.

James Alexander Stewart (2 November 1888 – 23 September 1939) was an Australian rules footballer who played with St Kilda in the Victorian Football League (VFL).
