= James Steuart =

James Steuart may refer to:

- James Steuart (Royal Navy officer) (1690–1757), Admiral of the Fleet
- Sir James Steuart of Coltness (1608–1681), Lord Provost of Edinburgh
- Sir James Stewart (Lord Advocate) (1635–1713), or Steuart, Lord Advocate, 4th son
- Sir James Stewart (advocate) (1681–1727), or Steuart, Solicitor-General of Scotland, son of the 1st Baronet
- Sir James Steuart (economist) (1707–1780), Jacobite and economist, son of the Solicitor-General
- Sir James Steuart Denham, 8th Baronet (1744–1839), general, son of the economist

== See also ==
- James Stewart (disambiguation)
