= Jimmy Stewart (meteorologist) =

American TV meteorologist and photographer

Jimmy Stewart (born 1941) is an American retired television meteorologist and photographer. He was the chief meteorologist for KVOA-TV 4 in Tucson, Arizona from 1998 until his retirement in 2011, and is among the most well-known television personalities in the area. He is also an astrophotographer, taking advantage of the reduced light pollution in and around Kitt Peak, located to the west of the city.

Stewart began his broadcast career in radio in Ann Arbor, Michigan in 1961. He subsequently worked in such cities as Washington, D.C., Des Moines and Minneapolis, ending up in Tucson, where he worked at radio station KNST before making the jump to TV, taking over as weekend weather anchor at CBS affiliate KOLD in 1981, earning a degree in atmospheric physics from the University of Arizona while serving as the on-air weathercaster. Stewart made the move to NBC affiliate KVOA in 1990. Initially, he served as a morning and afternoon meteorologist, but moved into the Chief Meteorologist role after Michael Goodrich, the longtime meteorologist for KVOA, retired in June 1998.

After his retirement, Jimmy Stewart has been focusing on his astrophotography, and also traveling to various schools throughout Southern Arizona, teaching the science behind the weather to children.
