= Jamie B. Stewart =

American businessman

Jamie B. Stewart, Jr. was previously President and CEO of the Federal Farm Credit Banks Funding Corporation, based in Jersey City, NJ., since January 2004.

Prior to joining FFCBFC, Stewart was first vice president of the Federal Reserve Bank of New York from January 1999 to January 2004. During a portion of his tenure with the Fed, there was no president of this branch of the Federal Reserve due to the resignation of William J. McDonough in 2003. McDonough was not replaced until November 2003, at which point he was succeeded by Timothy Geithner. (Geithner later became the Secretary of the Treasury under President Barack Obama.) Due to this situation, Stewart served as acting governor from June through December 2003, and had voting rights on the Federal Open Market Committee, which was headed at that time by Alan Greenspan.

Stewart was instrumental in guiding the Federal Reserve Bank of New York through the banking crisis surrounding the terrorist attacks of September 11, 2001, which caused a temporary liquidity crisis in the U.S. banking system.

Jamie B. Stewart started his professional career with the United States Navy as a surface line officer from 1966-1970. Stewart received a B.A. in French from Dartmouth College in 1966, a M.B.A. from Harvard Business School in 1972, and a J.D. from Suffolk Law School in Boston in 1980. In the following years, his career path took him from the Bank of Boston to Bank of America to Crocker National Bank (San Francisco) to Mellon Bank, where he served as vice chairman, with responsibility for overall wholesale banking, international operations and cash management activities.

Stewart resides in Brooklyn, NY, with his wife, Deborah.
