= Jim Stewart (footballer, born 1917) =

Australian rules footballer, born 1917

Personal information
- Full name: James L. Stewart
- Born: 16 February 1917
- Died: 31 January 1942 (aged 24); Royal Melbourne Hospital
- Original team: Kensington Juniors
- Height: 182 cm (6 ft 0 in)
- Weight: 83 kg (183 lb)

Playing career^{1}
| Years | Club | Games (Goals) |
| 1938–1941 | North Melbourne | 35 (19) |
- ^{1} Playing statistics correct to the end of 1941.

James L. Stewart (16 February 1917 – 31 January 1942) was an Australian rules footballer who played with North Melbourne in the Victorian Football League (VFL).

== History ==
Stewart could only manage six appearances in his first two league seasons but was a good performer in the reserves, winning the club's reserves best and fairest in 1939. His efforts that year earned him more regular games in 1940, with 13 games and 10 goals. He then played 16 of North Melbourne's 18 games in 1941 and won their most consistent player award.

Before the 1942 season, Stewart fell seriously ill with appendicitis and died on 31 January following an operation at Royal Melbourne Hospital.
