= Jim Stewart (footballer, born 1889) =

Australian rules footballer

Personal information
- Full name: James Hadley Stewart
- Born: 13 August 1889; Carlton, Victoria
- Died: 12 December 1964 (aged 75); Footscray, Victoria

Playing career^{1}
Years	Club	Games (Goals)
1915, 1917, 1919–20	South Melbourne	29 (15)
- ^{1} Playing statistics correct to the end of 1920.

James Hadley Stewart (13 August 1889 – 12 December 1964) was an Australian rules footballer who played with South Melbourne in the Victorian Football League (VFL).
