= Puttenham, Surrey =

Village and parish in Surrey, England

Coordinates: 51.2220°N 0.6640°W

Puttenham
- Village
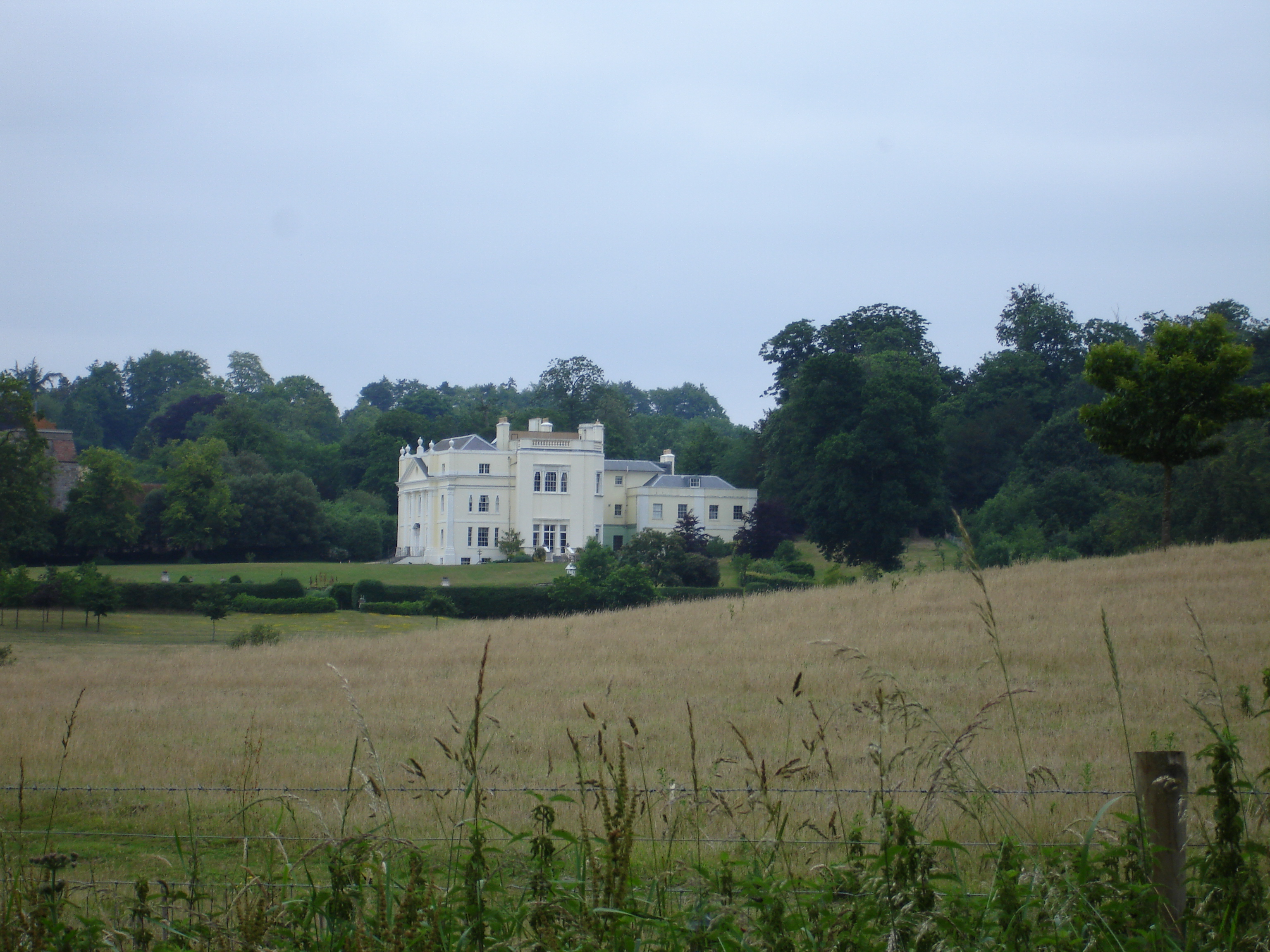
- Puttenham Priory

- Location within Surrey
- Area: 7.88 km^{2} (3.04 sq mi)
- Population: 601 (Civil Parish 2011)
  - Density: 76/km^{2} (200/sq mi)
- OS grid reference: SU9348
- Civil parish: Puttenham
- District: Guildford
- Shire county: Surrey
- Region: South East
- Country: England
- Sovereign state: United Kingdom
- Post town: Guildford
- Postcode district: GU3
- Dialling code: 01483
- Police: Surrey
- Fire: Surrey
- Ambulance: South East Coast
- UK Parliament: Godalming and Ash

Puttenham is a village in Surrey, England, located just south of the Hog's Back which is the narrowest stretch of the North Downs. Puttenham is about midway between the towns of Guildford and Farnham, and can be accessed from the A31 trunk road which runs along the spine of the Hog's Back. Villages nearby include Wanborough, Shackleford and Compton.

== Geography ==
Puttenham is situated in an east–west stretch of the Vale of Holmesdale in Surrey, called Puttenham Vale – which stretches between the towns of Guildford in the east and Farnham in the west, and runs parallel to and immediately south of the narrow Hog's Back section of the chalk North Downs (along which the A31 trunk road runs). To the south-west of the village is Puttenham Common, part of the Greensand Ridge, that defines the south border of the Vale.

The houses of Puttenham mainly line the road 'The Street' that runs through it from west to east, making it a largely linear settlement.

== History ==
There is evidence of Bronze Age occupation in the area, the mound known as Frowsbury Hill is a burial mound from that era.

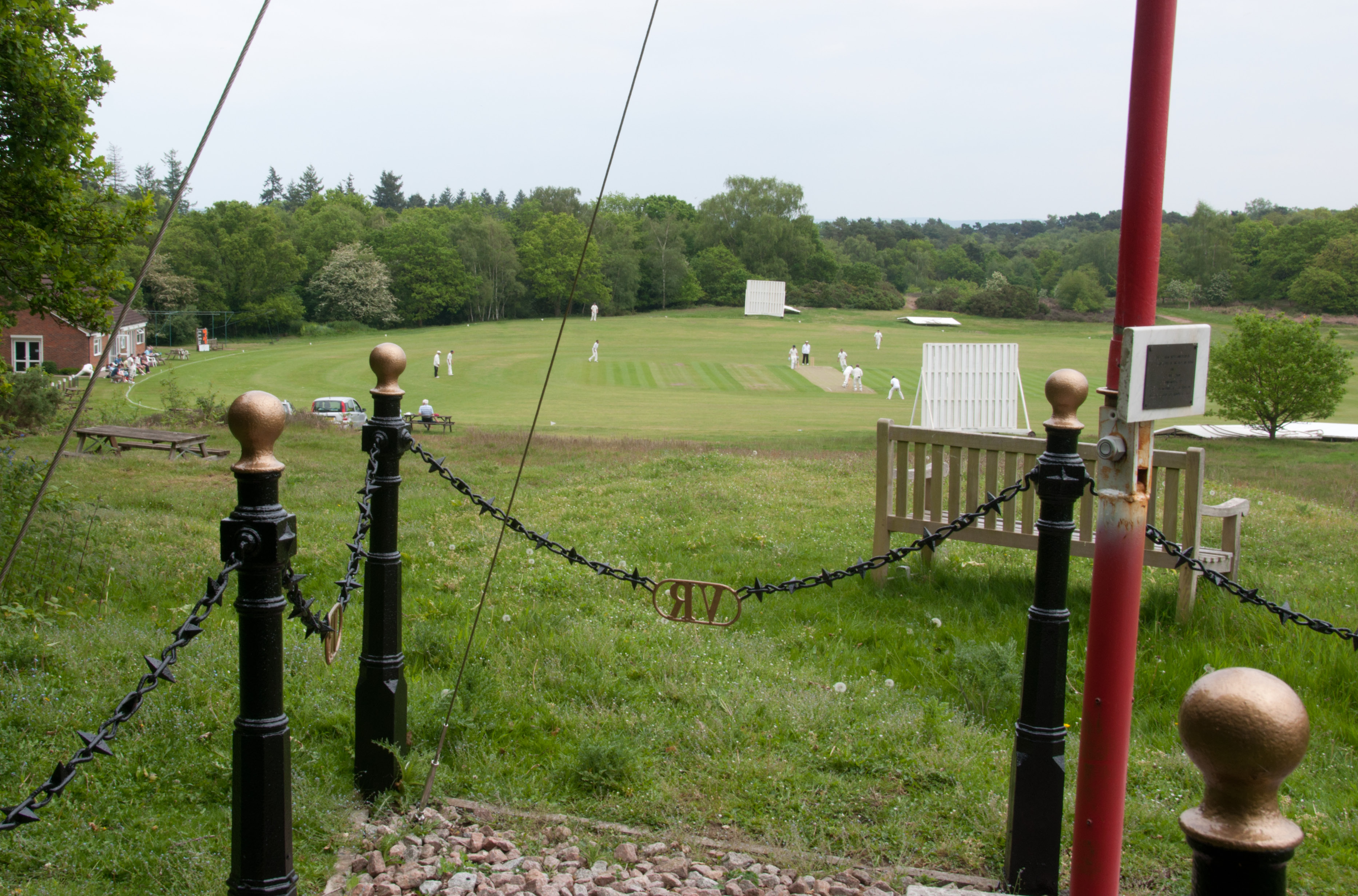
The site of Queen Victoria's review in 1858.

Puttenham was referred to in the Domesday Book of 1086 and was called Reddesolham or Rodsall. Its domesday assets were owned by the Bishop of Bayeux and were: 1 plough, 2 acres (0.81 ha) of meadow, woodland worth 4 hogs. It rendered £2 per year to its feudal overlords.

Queen Victoria reviewed 20,000 troops from Frowsbury Hill on 7 July 1858.

=== Puttenham Priory ===
Puttenham Priory is a large house at the eastern end of the village. The original house dated from 1266 when it was a priory. It was extended 1730 and again in 1762 by Thomas Parker, who added the Palladian front. It is Grade II* listed architecturally, the mid-category. The house is now the home of Queen drummer, Roger Taylor.

== Amenities ==
=== St John the Baptist church ===
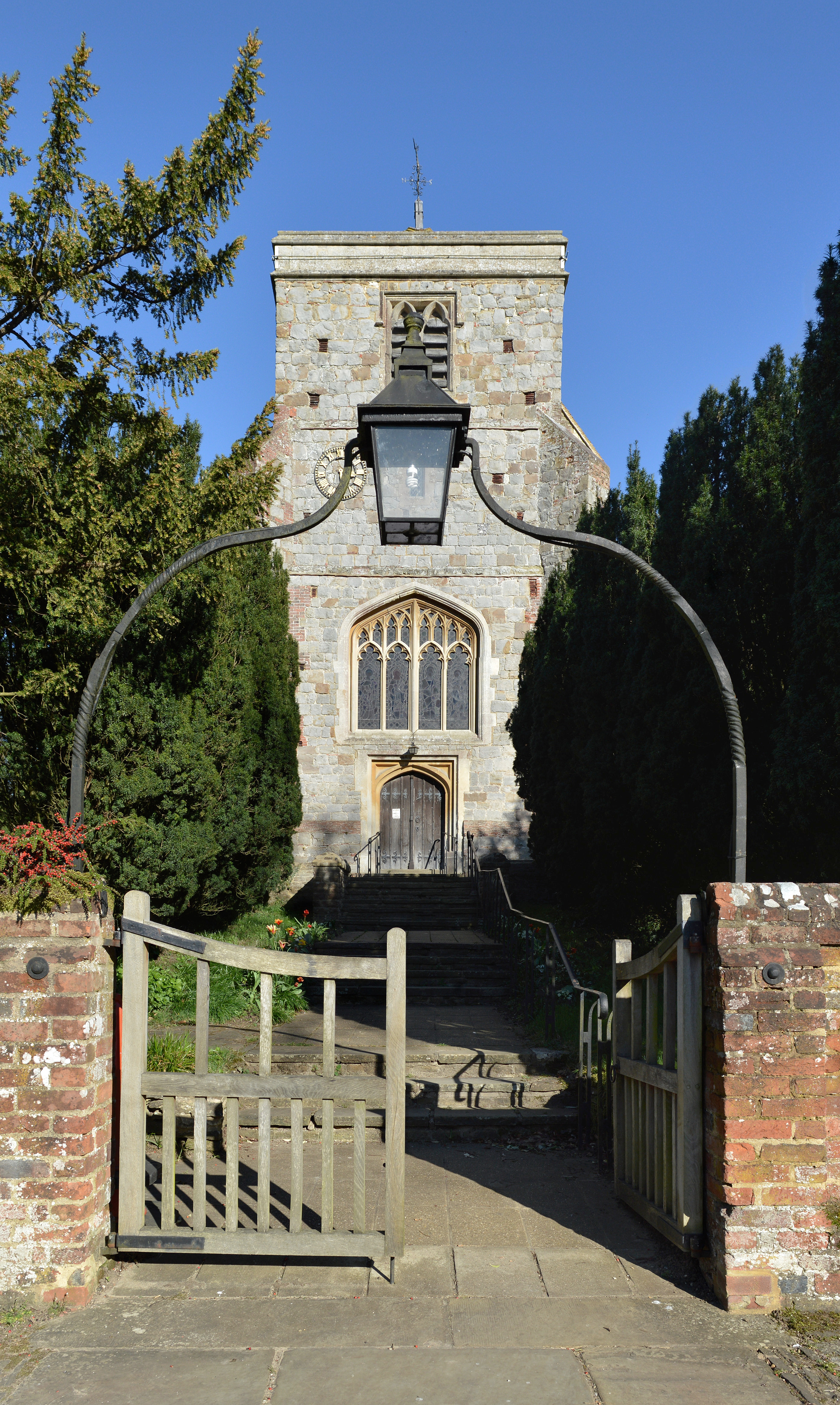
Church of St John the Baptist

St John the Baptist church is towards the eastern end of the village. This church was built in stages. The oldest part is late Saxon; in 1160, Norman pillars were built. In the 13th century, the Lady Chapel was added and in the 15th century the tower was added. In the 18th century the tower was destroyed by fire but was restored in the 20th century. The church is a Grade II* listed building.

=== Public house ===
The village has a pub called The Good Intent, first mentioned in the 1861 census, but the building has earlier origins.

=== Puttenham Golf Club ===
Puttenham Golf Club is a private members club and is one of the oldest golf clubs in Surrey, founded in 1894 by a group of Army Officers, Charterhouse School Masters and local businessmen. The course occupies land on Puttenham Heath and measures 6,220 yards (5,690 m) with a par of 71 from the white tees. The course is a mixture of heath and woodland, the tree-lined fairways have a particularly splendid backcloth of colour with attractive areas of heather and many species of wild flowers. There are some panoramic views from certain tees.

=== Puttenham Telephone Exchange ===
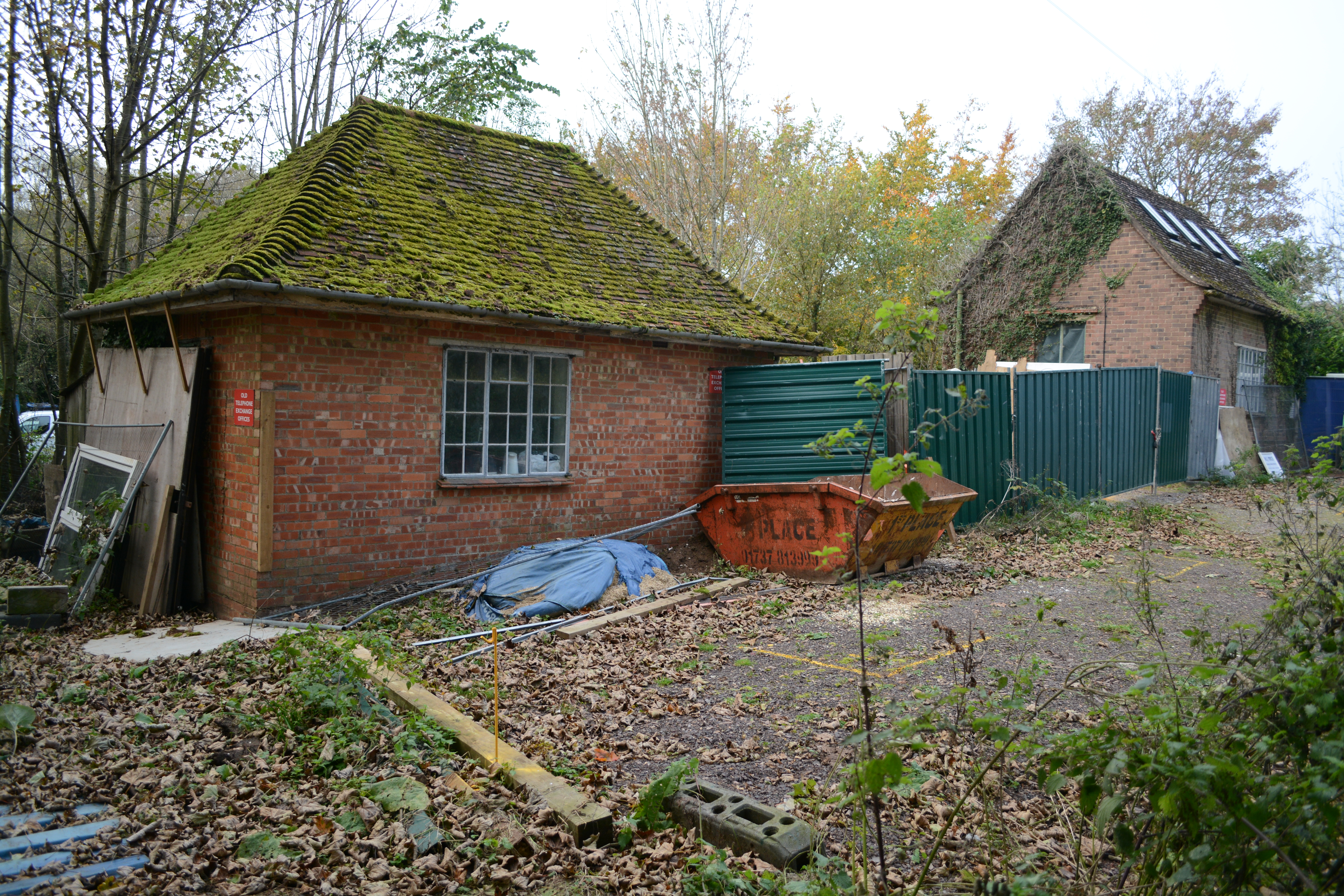
Puttenham telephone exchange

Puttenham used to have its own telephone exchange, consisting of two brick buildings near the Jolly Farmer public house. Finally decommissioned after being subsumed into Guildford, the exchange was sold in 2017 with planning permission for conversion to two private residences.

== Puttenham in literature ==
The village features in Brave New World, a dystopian novel by Aldous Huxley: "Puttenham was a modest little village nine stories high, with silos, a poultry farm, and a small vitamin-D factory."

Natalie Young's second novel, Season to Taste or How to Eat Your Husband (2014) is mostly set in Puttenham.

Sir Arthur Conan Doyle's historical novel Sir Nigel features an outlaw known as "The Wild Man of Puttenham".

== Demography and housing ==
2011 Census Homes
Output area	Detached	Semi-detached	Terraced	Flats and apartments	Caravans/temporary/mobile homes	shared between households
(Civil Parish)	107	65	52	16	0	0

The average level of accommodation in the region composed of detached houses was 28%, the average that was apartments was 22.6%.

2011 Census Key Statistics
Output area	Population	Households	% Owned outright	% Owned with a loan	hectares
(Civil Parish)	601	240	36.3%	27.9%	788

The proportion of households in the civil parish who owned their home outright compares to the regional average of 35.1%. The proportion who owned their home with a loan compares to the regional average of 32.5%. The remaining % is made up of rented dwellings (plus a negligible % of households living rent-free).

== Notable residents ==
- David Dane, virologist
- Roger Taylor, Queen drummer
