= Hogs Back Brewery =

Brewery in Tongham, United Kingdom

Coordinates: 51.2287°N 0.7322°W

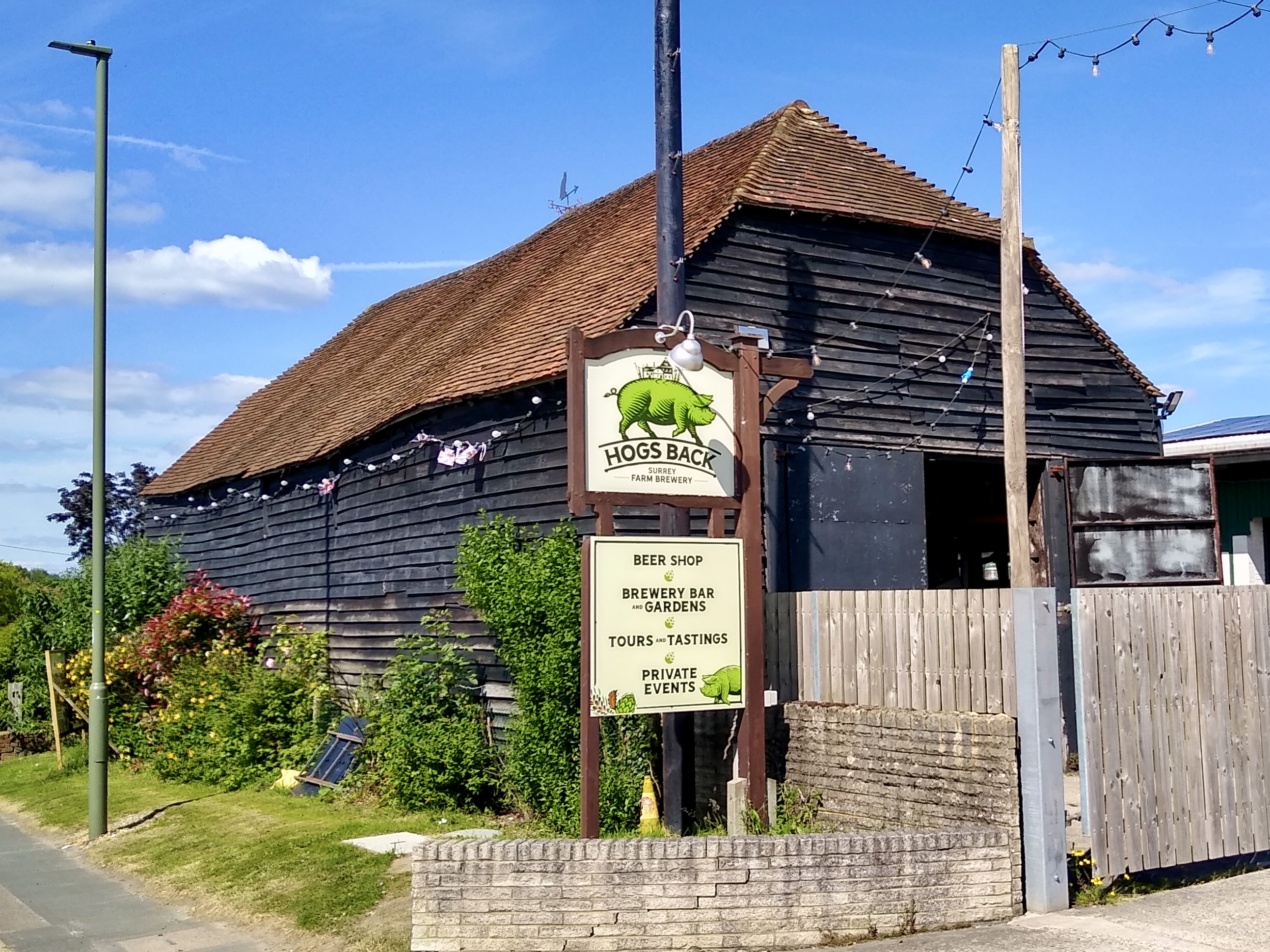
- Premises on The Street, Tongham
- Industry: Brewing
- Headquarters: Tongham, Surrey, England
- Key people: Rupert Thompson (Executive Chairman); Miles Chesterman (Managing Director)
- Products: Beer
- Website: Official website

Hogs Back Brewery is a hops-growing brewery in Tongham, Surrey, United Kingdom. The company was founded in November 1991 by Tony Stanton-Precious and brothers Martin and John Hunt. The brewery, in Tongham, Surrey, is based in a barn that dates from 1788. The first beer was brewed in August 1992. In 2013, Miles Chesterman was the head brewer and Rupert Thompson was the chairman.

In June 2014, Magners released their Cider Hog, a "portable cider dispenser" with a name and graphics similar to Hogs Back's own Hazy Hog cider, released 15 months prior. Concerned about trademark infringement, Hogs Back communicated with Magners for six months without an acceptable resolution, and so in February 2015 the Tongham brewery initiated legal action against the larger company. C&C Group disputed Hogs Back's claims.

In 2018, the hops garden was expanded to 8.5 acres (3.4 ha), with the new land growing Fuggle, Cascade, and Goldings. The following year, Hogs Back Brewery was expected to spend £350,000 (equivalent to £448,411 in 2025) on a traditional oast house (the first built in the UK in over 100 years). This new kiln was to be built adjacent to the brewhouse and one furlong (660 ft; 200 m) from the hops garden; it was expected to be operational before the Hogs Back's harvest in September 2019. During the eleven months the kiln is not drying hops, it will be "an event space and visitor centre, educating people about the local hop farming industry which Hogs Back is helping to revive."

== Products ==
Name	Type	Currently Available	Release Date	ABV	Citation(s)
Tongham TEA	Ale	Yes		4.2%	
Hazy Hog	Cider	Yes	March 2013	5.0%	
Hogstar	Lager	Yes	December 2013	4.5%	
Surrey Nirvana Session IPA	IPA	Yes		4.0%	
Hog IPA	IPA	Yes		4.5%	
Little Swine (Alcohol Free)	Pale Ale	Yes		0.5%	
Advent Ale	Ale	Limited Edition		4.4%	
Montezuma's Chocolate	Lager	No	2014	4.5%	

Premiering in 2013, the Hogstar lager was fermented longer than contemporary lagers, resulting in what Hogs Back called "the traditional way to round out and balance 'lager' beers. Carbonation develops naturally and we do not pasteurise." This new unpasteurised British lager hoped to succeed on the coattails of Pilsner Urquell, a Londoner lager that helped Plzeňský Prazdroj, a. s. grow 17% in the first half of 2013. Hogstar's initial list price was £1.85 (equivalent to £2.59 in 2025).

In partnership with Montezuma's, a chocolate lager was released in 2014. Though the reviewers with All About Beer called the bronze beer a novelty, the chocolate flavor was described as surprisingly good on its own merits.
