= James Stewart-Mackenzie =

James Stewart-Mackenzie may refer to:

- James Alexander Stewart-Mackenzie (1784–1843), Scottish politician and colonial administrator
- James Stewart-Mackenzie, 1st Baron Seaforth (1847–1923), Scottish soldier and landowner
