= Jim Stewart (Queen's Park footballer) =

Scottish footballer

Personal information
- Place of birth: Scotland
- Position: Right half

Senior career*
Years	Team	Apps	(Gls)
- Greenock
1962–1965	Queen's Park	47	(3)

International career
1962–1965	Scotland Amateurs	10	(0)
- * Club domestic league appearances and goals

James I. Stewart is a retired amateur Scottish football right half who played in the Scottish League for Queen's Park. He was capped by Scotland at amateur level.
