= Jamie Stewart (cricketer) =

Australian cricketer (born 1970)

Personal information
- Born: 22 August 1970 (age 56); East Fremantle, Western Australia
- Source: ESPNcricinfo, 2 February 2017

Jamie Stewart (born 22 August 1970) is an Australian cricketer. He played 20 first-class and 38 List A matches for New South Wales and Western Australia between 1992/93 and 2000/01.
