= Seale and Sands =

Civil parish in Surrey, England

Coordinates: 51°13′N 0°43.5′W

Seale and Sands is a civil parish in the Guildford District Council area of Surrey, England with a population of 887. The principal settlement is Seale; other places include Sandy Cross and The Sands.

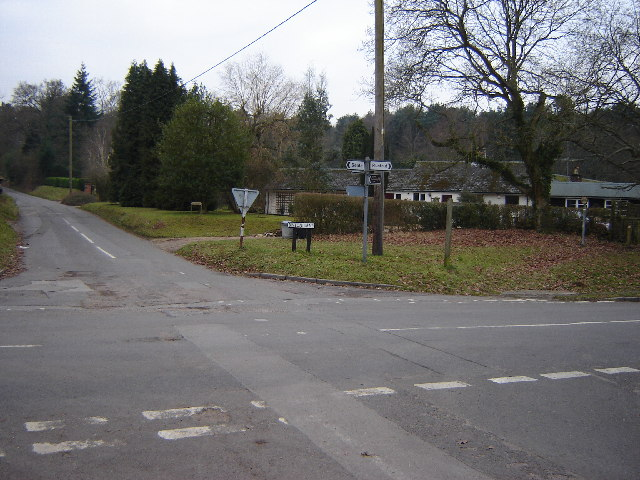
Sandy Cross photographed in January 2006

The Sands, including Sandy Cross forms the rest of the local government rural unit that provides certain minor services. Major services are provided by Guildford Borough Council and Surrey County Council. Across the old nucleus and mostly below the North Downs passes a short stretch of the long-distance footpath, the Pilgrims' Way (North Downs Way). Littleworth Cross is the southern sparsely inhabited junction settlement on minor woodland lanes, which has a heritage-listed park and garden which played host to an important event in the evolution of the work of international early 20th century homes and gardens designer Gertrude Jekyll. The west of the parish contains Farnham Golf Club.

The parish is almost square, 2 miles east to west and north to south. It covers 887 hectares (2,190 acres) most of this is open countryside. The parish of Seale (combined villages of Seale and Sands) has a population of 900,

Apart from houses by the old school, most of the houses in the parish are to the south, along Binton Lane and in The Sands.

== The Sands ==
The Sands, is the largest settlement in the parish, green-buffered from all other settlements. The Sands has a pub, The Barley Mow. Its local shop and post office has closed.

== Sandy Cross ==
On the Seale side of Farnham Golf Course is part of the parish sometimes known as Sandy Cross, towards the west it turns at an informal point into Furze Hill and a heavily pined area. Here behind a few houses is a worked sand pit.

== Demography and housing ==
The 2011 United Kingdom census reveals that parish, had 907 people living in 360 households. Almost all of these had farmland or gardens.

2011 Census Key Statistics
Output area	Population	Households	Owned outright	Owned with a loan	hectares
Seale and Sands	907	360	169 (46.9%)	127 (35.3%)	887

The proportion of households in the civil parish who owned their home outright compares to the regional average of 35.1%. The proportion who owned their home with a loan compares to the regional average of 32.5%. The remaining % is made up of rented dwellings (plus a negligible % of households living rent-free).

2011 Census Homes
Output area	Detached	Semi-detached	Terraced	Flats and apartments	Caravans/temporary/mobile homes	shared between households
(Civil Parish)	244	98	12	4	2	0

The average level of accommodation in the region composed of detached houses was 28%, the average that was apartments was 22.6%.
