= James Stewart (archaeologist) =

James R. Stewart
- Born: 11 July 1913; Sydney NSW
- Died: 6 February 1962 (aged 48); Bathurst NSW
- Education: University of Cambridge
- Known for: Archaeology of Cyprus
- Spouse: 1. Eleanor Neal 2. Dorothy Evelyn (Eve) Dray

James Rivers Barrington Stewart (3 July 1913 – 6 February 1962) was a noted Australian archaeologist of Cyprus and Ancient south-west Asia at the University of Sydney.

== Early life and career ==
Stewart was born in Sydney and died at Bathurst, New South Wales and was a descendant of a line of Bathurst landed gentry. He spent much of his childhood in Europe attended secondary school in Australia and enrolled at The Leys School in Cambridge in 1930, at the age of 17, then attended Cambridge University the following year. His mother died in January 1932, leaving him £7000. He visited Bagdad, Damascus, Aleppo, and Baalbeck on his way to England in 1932. He married Eleanor Neal in England on 1 July 1935 and the two travelled to Australia for a visit. James won a Wilkins Fellowship, which he used for them both to travel to the Near East with a short stay in Cyprus. They arrived in Istanbul in January 1936, and they spent time digging and collecting.

== War service and first marriage ==
Jim volunteered to join the British army in May 1940 and requested to be posted in Cyprus. Before leaving England for a short trip to Australia with Eleanor he left £300 for the publication of his work and bequeathed his massive personal library to the Cyprus Museum. He reported for duty at Haifa on 30 January 1941, but was captured by the end of the year and spent the rest of the war as a German prisoner of war. After liberation by American troops he returned to England in April 1945.

== Move to Australia and marriage ==
In 1947 Stewart made what was intended to be a two-week visit to Australia via Cyprus, but there met Dorothy Evelyn (Eve) Dray (born August 1914), who grew up in Cairo and shared his interest in Cyprus having made her first trip in 1926 then returned after completing her education in 1937. Stewart arranged for Eve to come to Australia as his ‘technical assistant’.

== Academic career in Australia and second marriage ==
Stewart obtained a position at the Sydney University, where he lectured in the History department, at the Nicholson Museum, becoming the first person to teach archaeology at an Australian university. He lobbied for the establishment of a Department of Archaeology, which was created in 1948. Stewart divorced Eleanor and married Eve in 1952, and they moved to Mount Pleasant at Bathurst, where he had his own laboratory and library. Stewart was appointed Professor of Near Eastern Studies in 1960 but died just 18 months into his tenure on 6 February 1962. Eve worked for nearly fifty years after his death to complete her husband's work. A large collection of his Cyprus material was donated to the Nicholson Museum in Sydney, while the British Museum acquired the artefacts from two tomb groups as a result of his excavations at Bellapais-Vounous in 1937–1938.

He built up a large collection of coins from Rome, Byzantium, Cyprus, and the Crusades.

== Publications ==
- Stewart, J. (1937). Excavations At Vounous, Cyprus. Antiquity, 11(43), 356-356.
