= James Stewart (Australian cricketer) =

Australian cricketer

Personal information
- Full name: James Stewart

Domestic team information
- Years: Team
- 1873: Victoria
- Source: Cricinfo, 6 June 2015

James Stewart was an Australian cricketer. He played one first-class cricket match for Victoria in 1873.

== See also ==
- List of Victoria first-class cricketers
