= James Wallace Stewart =

James 'Jimmie' Wallace Stewart (1921 – 10 June 2006), was a professor of haematology at Middlesex Hospital, London.

Stewart was born in Assam, India, where his father was a medical doctor. At the age of ten, Stewart went to school at St George's College, Weybridge. He studied medicine at Middlesex hospital medical school from 1940 to 1944, and became an assistant pathologist at Middlesex Hospital, London, in 1948 after national service. He was promoted to senior lecturer in 1950, reader in 1959, and professor in 1970, and retired in 1986. He was treasurer of the British Society for Haematology for its first 15 years, and a founder fellow of the Royal College of Pathologists. His laboratory was one of the first in the United Kingdom to have a Coulter counter, and he helped to develop quality assurance in haematology. He was consultant haematologist to the London Clinic well beyond his 70th year.

Stewart married Margaret (Peggy) in 1946; they had five children and eight grandchildren.
