= 1800 in Great Britain =

Events from the year 1800 in Great Britain.

== Incumbents ==
- Monarch – George III
- Prime Minister – William Pitt the Younger (Tory)
- Foreign Secretary – Lord Grenville

== Events ==
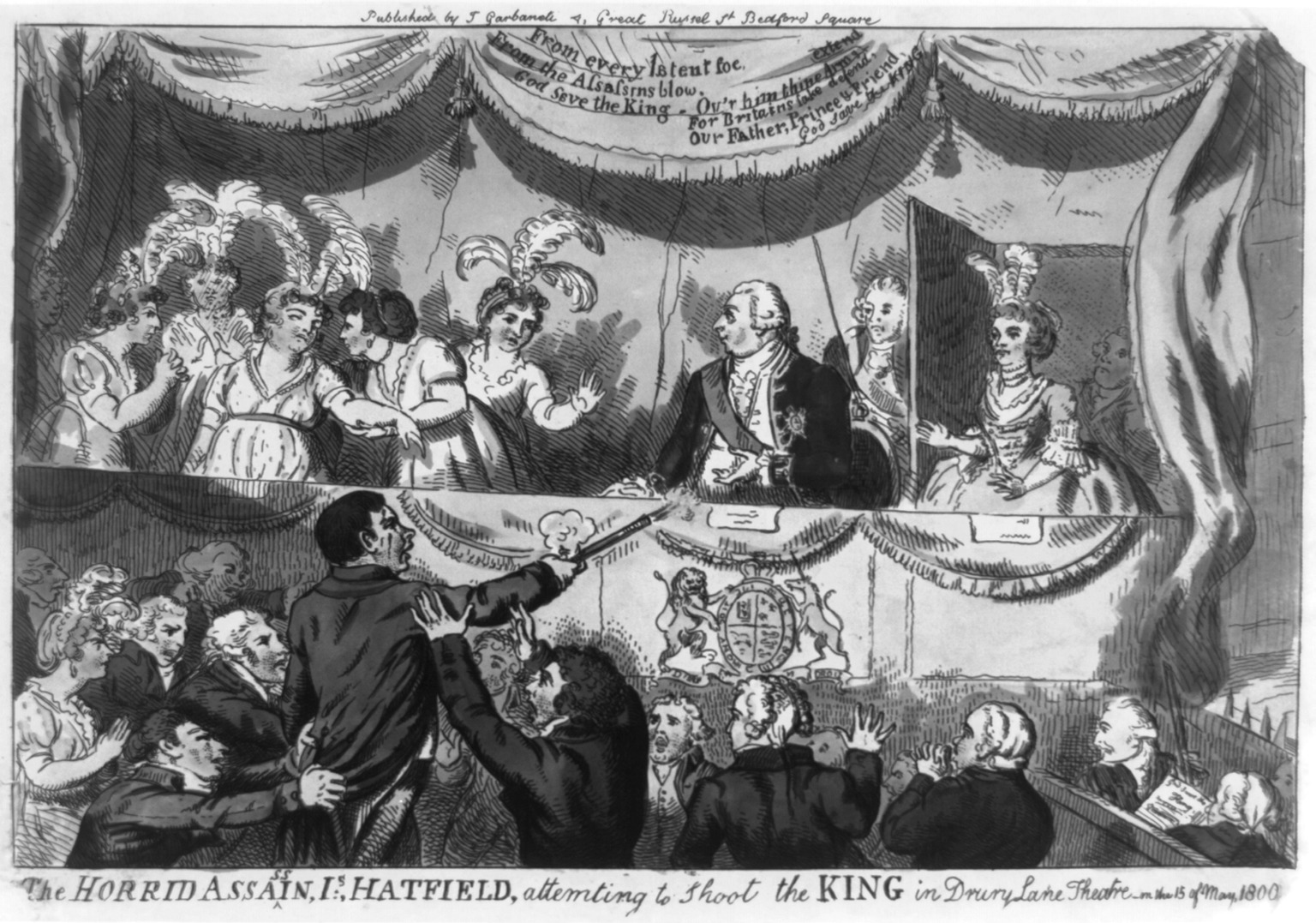
Assassination attempt against King George III, 15 May 1800.

- January – Maria Edgeworth's first extended work of fiction, the pioneering historical novel Castle Rackrent, is published anonymously in London.
- 8 January – first soup kitchens open in London.
- 13 January – Royal Institution granted a royal charter.
- March – Robert Bloomfield's popular poem The Farmer's Boy is published.
- 17 March – HMS Queen Charlotte (1790) catches fire off the coast of Cabrera, Balearic Islands, with the loss of 700 lives.
- 22 March – Company of Surgeons granted a royal charter to become the Royal College of Surgeons in London.
- 15 May – George III survives two assassination attempts in London: In Hyde Park, a bullet intended for him hits a man standing alongside; and later at the Theatre Royal, Drury Lane, two bullets fired by an insane man (James Hadfield) hit the wooden panel behind him.
- 30 June – Glasgow Police Act authorises creation of the City of Glasgow Police, which first musters on 15 November.
- 2 July & 1 August – Acts of Union 1800: The complementary Union with Ireland Act 1800, an Act of the Parliament of Great Britain, and Act of Union (Ireland) 1800, an Act of the Parliament of Ireland, are passed by the respective legislatures, to unite the Kingdom of Ireland and Kingdom of Great Britain into the United Kingdom of Great Britain and Ireland with effect from 1 January 1801. The latter Act achieves its majority of 43 in the Irish House of Commons (which will be abolished under the measures) partly through the bribing of former opponents by the award of peerages and honours. The British act is given royal assent by King George III in August. Catholic emancipation has been promised as part of the legislation by William Pitt (the British Prime Minister), Lord Cornwallis (Lord Lieutenant of Ireland) and Lord Castlereagh (Chief Secretary of Ireland) but they are forced to drop it by the King leading to their resignations.
- 28 July – two acts of Parliament are passed in response to James Hadfield's assassination attempt on the King: the Criminal Lunatics Act requires and provides a procedure for the indefinite detention of mentally ill offenders; and the Treason Act aligns procedures for the trial of anyone attempting to take the monarch's life with those for murder in general.
- 4 September – Siege of Malta (1798–1800): The French garrison in Valletta surrenders to British troops who have been called at the invitation of the Maltese. The islands of Malta and Gozo become the Malta Protectorate.
- 22 September – Downing College, Cambridge, granted a Royal Charter, the first new college there for two centuries.
- December – Queen Charlotte of Mecklenburg-Strelitz introduces a Christmas tree at a party for children at Windsor.

=== Ongoing ===
- Anglo-Spanish War, 1796–1808
- French Revolutionary Wars, War of the Second Coalition

=== Undated ===
- Inflation reaches an all-time recorded high of 36.5%.
- Infrared radiation is discovered by William Herschel.

== Births ==
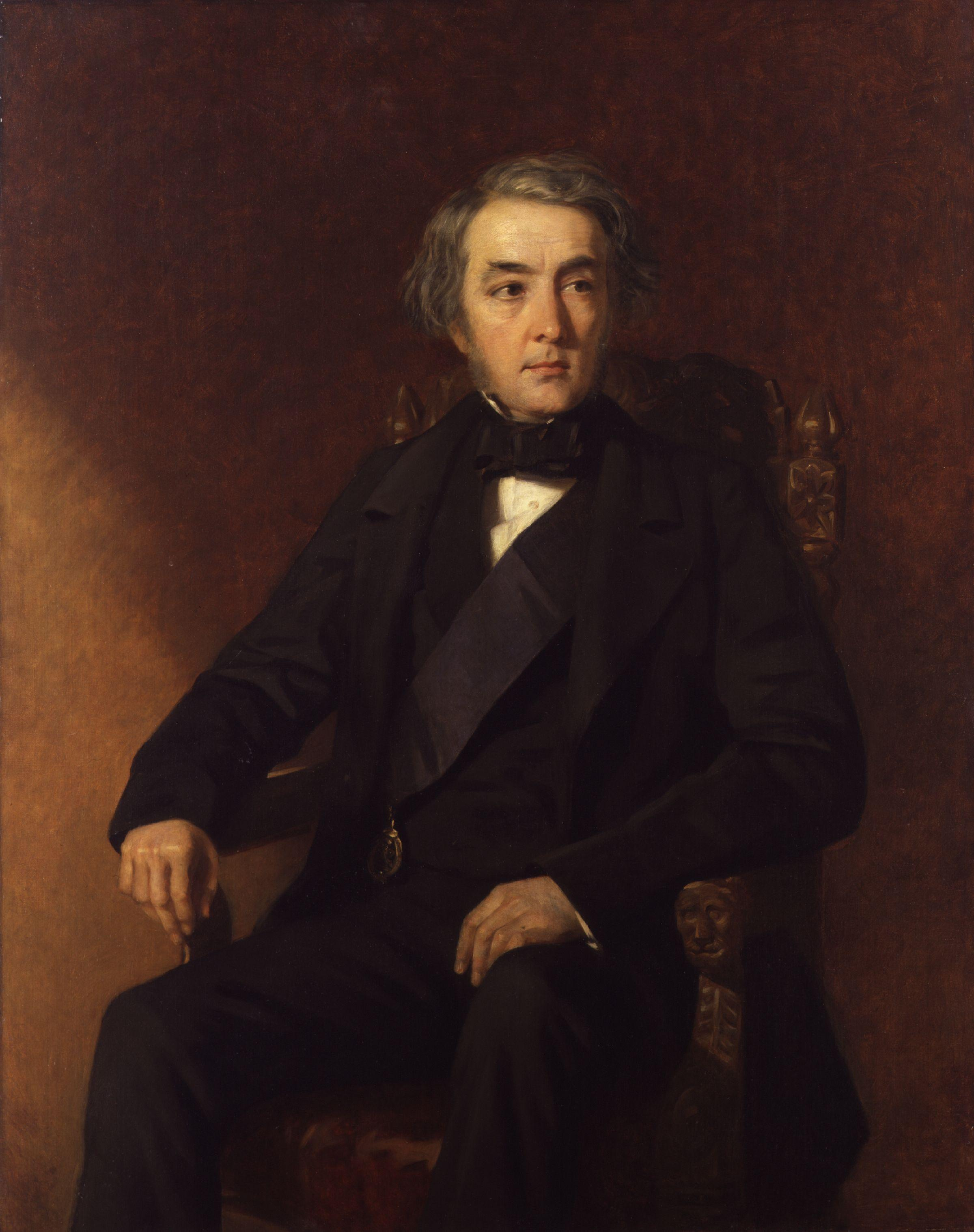
Francis Egerton, 1st Earl of Ellesmere

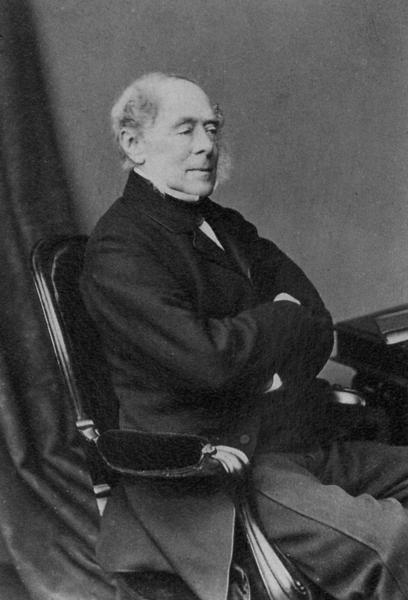
George Villiers, 4th Earl of Clarendon

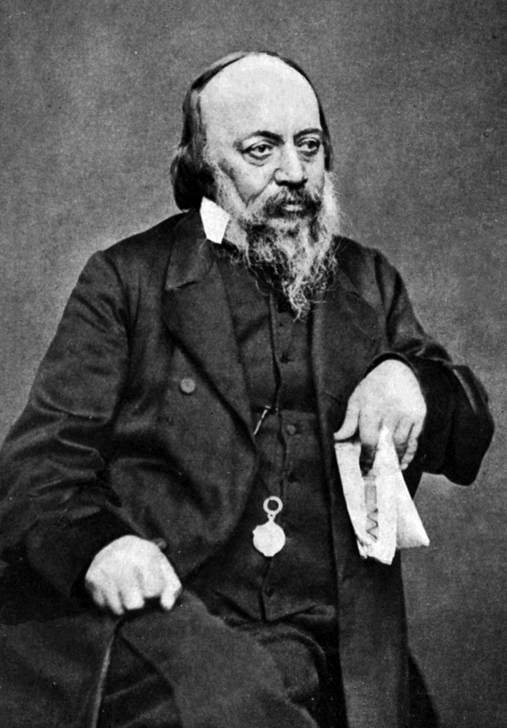
Edwin Chadwick

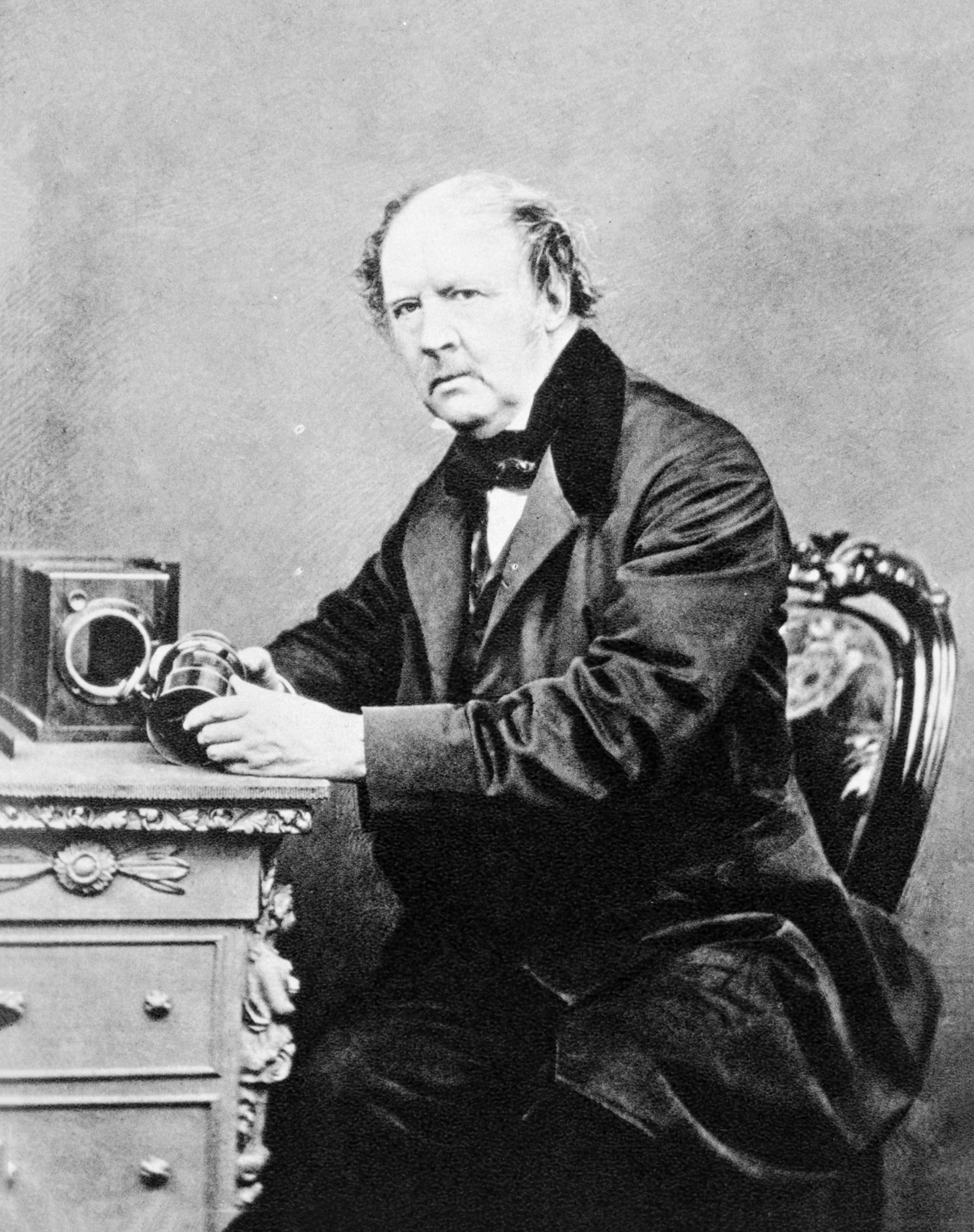
Henry Fox Talbot

- 1 January – Francis Egerton, 1st Earl of Ellesmere (died 1857)
- 4 January – Charles Baillie-Hamilton, politician (died 1865)
- 6 January – George Thomas Doo, engraver (died 1886)
- 12 January – George Villiers, 4th Earl of Clarendon, diplomat and statesman (died 1870)
- 24 January – Edwin Chadwick, social reformer (died 1890)
- 27 January – Evelyn Denison, 1st Viscount Ossington, statesman (died 1875)
- 1 February – Brian Houghton Hodgson, naturalist and civil servant (died 1894)
- 11 February – Henry Fox Talbot, photographic pioneer (died 1877)
- 12 February – John Edward Gray, zoologist (died 1875)
- 23 February – William Jardine, naturalist (died 1874)
- 4 March – William Price, physician and eccentric (died 1893)
- 10 March
  - Horatio Thomas Austin, Royal Navy officer and explorer (died 1865)
  - George Hudson, railway financier (died 1871)
- 15 April – James Clark Ross, Royal Navy officer and explorer (died 1862)
- 16 April
  - George Bingham, 3rd Earl of Lucan, soldier (died 1888)
  - William Chambers of Glenormiston, publisher and politician (died 1883)
- 4 May – John McLeod Campbell, churchman (died 1872)
- 8 May – William Lovett, Chartist leader (died 1877)
- 9 May – Samuel Carter Hall, journalist (died 1889)
- 28 May – Edward Baines, newspaper editor and Member of Parliament (died 1890)
- 1 June – Charles Fremantle, Royal Navy officer (died 1869)
- 9 June – James Wilson Carmichael, marine painter (died 1868)
- 30 June – Richard Bethell, 1st Baron Westbury, Lord Chancellor (died 1873)
- 22 July – Robert McCormick, Royal Navy surgeon and explorer (died 1890)
- 29 July – George Bradshaw, cartographer and timetable publisher (died 1853)
- 22 August – Edward Bouverie Pusey, churchman (died 1882)
- 10 September – Edwin Guest, antiquary (died 1880)
- 12 September – John Bentinck, 5th Duke of Portland (died 1879)
- 22 September
  - George Bentham, botanist (died 1884)
  - Thomas Holloway, pharmacist and philanthropist (died 1883)
- 30 September – Decimus Burton, architect and garden designer (died 1881)
- 11 October – William Calcraft, hangman (died 1879)
- 18 October – Henry Taylor, dramatist (died 1886)
- 25 October – Thomas Babington Macaulay, 1st Baron Macaulay, poet (died 1859)
- 4 November – George Long, classical scholar (died 1879)
- 18 November – John Nelson Darby, evangelist (died 1882)
- 4 December – William Fenwick Williams, military leader (died 1883)
- 20 December – Charles Wood, 1st Viscount Halifax, statesman (died 1885)
- 25 December – John Phillips, geologist (died 1874)
- 27 December – John Goss, organist and composer (died 1880)

=== Unknown dates ===
- Frederick Yeates Hurlstone, painter (died 1869)
- Thomas Henry Lister, novelist and Registrar General (died 1842)

== Deaths ==
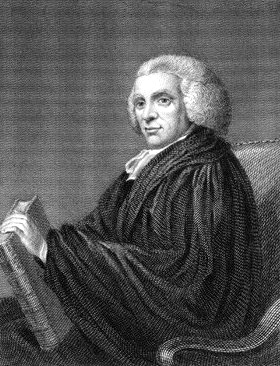
William Jones

- 6 January – William Jones, divine (born 1726)
- 22 January – George Steevens, Shakespearean commentator (born 1736)
- 23 February – Joseph Warton, academic and literary critic (born 1722)
- 14 March – Daines Barrington, naturalist (born 1727)
- 25 April – William Cowper, poet (born 1731)
- 23 May – Henry Cort, ironmaster (born 1741?)
- 30 June – Thomas Townshend, 1st Viscount Sydney, politician (born 1732)
- 16 August – Samuel Barrington, admiral (born 1729)
- 25 August – Elizabeth Montagu, literary critic (born 1720)
- 5 November – Jesse Ramsden, astronomical instrument maker (born 1735)
- 30 November – Matthew Robinson, 2nd Baron Rokeby, eccentric nobleman (born 1712)
- 26 December – Mary Robinson, poet, actress and royal mistress (born 1756)
- 27 December – Hugh Blair, Presbyterian preacher and man of letters (born 1718)
