= 1756 in Great Britain =

Events from the year 1756 in Great Britain.

== Incumbents ==
- Monarch – George II
- Prime Minister – Thomas Pelham-Holles, 1st Duke of Newcastle (Whig) (until 16 November); William Cavendish, 4th Duke of Devonshire (Whig) (starting 16 November)

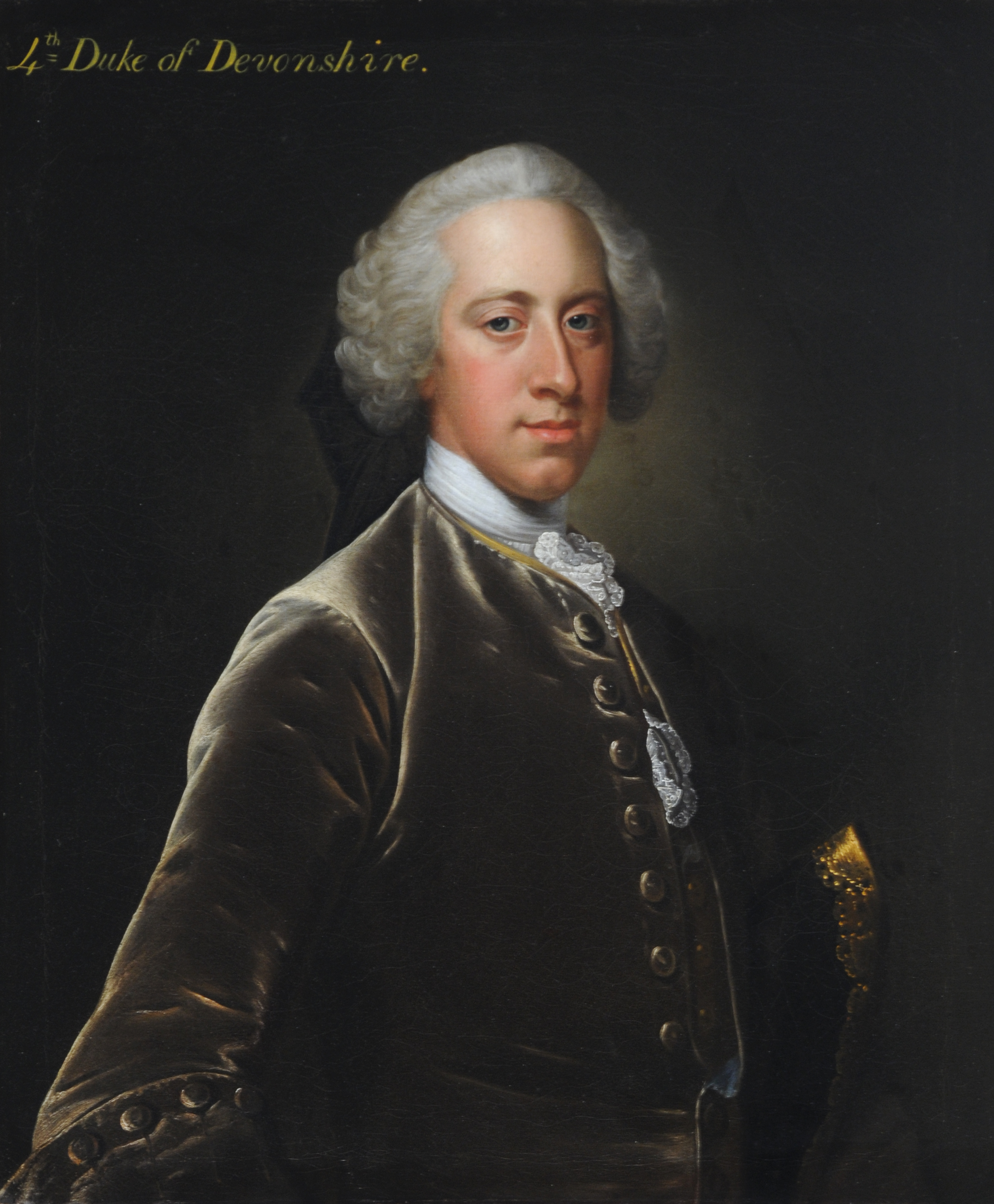
William Cavendish, 4th Duke of Devonshire

== Events ==
- 16 January – Treaty of Westminster signed between Britain and Prussia guaranteeing the neutrality of Hanover, the German province controlled by King George II.
- 12 April – Siege of Fort St Philip begins when the French under Armand de Vignerot du Plessis, Duke of Richelieu, land near Port Mahón on Menorca and besiege the British garrison here in a prelude to the Seven Years' War.
- 17 May – Seven Years' War formally begins when Britain declares war on France.
- 20 May – Seven Years' War: Battle of Minorca: The British fleet under John Byng is defeated by the French under Roland-Michel Barrin de La Galissonière.
- 20 June – a garrison of the British Army in India is imprisoned in the Black Hole of Calcutta.
- 25 June – foundation of The Marine Society in London, the world's oldest seafarers' charity.
- 29 June – Seven Years' War: Siege of Fort St Philip at Port Mahón ends when the British garrison in Menorca surrenders to the French under the Duke of Richelieu after two months' siege.
- 6 October – hurricane hits Britain causing large losses of corn and other crops.
- 16 November – Thomas Pelham-Holles, 1st Duke of Newcastle-upon-Tyne, resigns as Prime Minister after British failure in the Battle of Minorca. He is succeeded by the Pitt–Devonshire ministry formed by William Cavendish, 4th Duke of Devonshire, and William Pitt.
- 4 December – Pitt becomes Secretary of State for the Southern Department.
- Undated – completion of William Edwards' Old Bridge, Pontypridd. With a 140 ft (43 m) span it becomes (by 10 ft) the longest single-span bridge in Great Britain, remaining so for 40 years.

=== Publications ===
- Edmund Burke's (anonymous) A Vindication of Natural Society.

== Births ==
- Unknown date – Peter William Baker, politician (died 1815)
- 3 March – William Godwin, writer (died 1836)
- 4 March – Henry Raeburn, Scottish painter (died 1823)
- April – William Gifford, satirist, critic, editor, poet, and controversialist (died 1826)
- 13 June – Edmund Lodge, writer (died 1839)
- 21 September – John Loudon McAdam, highway engineer (died 1836)
- 5 October – Samuel Oldknow, cotton manufacturer (died 1828)
- 7 October – Jemmy Wood, banker and miser (died 1836)
- 13 November – Edward Rushton, abolitionist and pioneer of education for the blind (died 1814)
- 18 November – Thomas Burgess, bishop, author and philosopher (died 1837)
- 22 November – Gilbert Wakefield, scholar (died 1801)

== Deaths ==
- 25 February – Eliza Haywood, actress and writer (born 1693)
- 24 July – George Vertue, engraver and antiquary (born 1684)
- 31 August – John Dandridge, distinguished colonel, planter (born 1700)
- 28 October – Charles Somerset, 4th Duke of Beaufort (born 1709)
- 8 December – William Stanhope, 1st Earl of Harrington, statesman and diplomat (born c. 1690)

== See also ==
- 1756 in Wales
