= 1753 in Great Britain =

Events from the year 1753 in Great Britain.

== Incumbents ==
- Monarch – George II
- Prime Minister – Henry Pelham (Whig)

== Events ==
- 29 January – after a month's absence, Elizabeth Canning returns to her mother's home in London and claims that she was abducted. The following criminal trial causes uproar.
- 6 June – Parliament passes Lord Hardwicke's Marriage Act "for the Better Preventing of Clandestine Marriage" in England and Wales, requiring marriages to be performed by licensed ministers and the reading of banns of marriage; it comes into effect in 1754. Jews and Quakers are exempted.
- 7 June – the British Museum is established in London by Act of Parliament.
- 7 July – Parliament's Jewish Naturalization Act, a measure to end discrimination against Jews, receives royal assent, but widespread opposition leads to its repeal in 1754.
- 11 September – last sitting of the Cornish Stannary Parliament.
- 23 October – first naval patients admitted to Royal Hospital Haslar in Hampshire. When the main building is completed in 1762 this will be the world's largest hospital and Europe's largest brick building.
- Undated – First stage of Horace Walpole's Gothic Revival 'Castle' at Strawberry Hill in London completed.

== Publications ==
- Jane Collier's satirical An Essay on the Art of Ingeniously Tormenting.
- David Hume's Essays and Treatises on Several Subjects.
- James Lind's A Treatise of the Scurvy.
- Samuel Richardson's novel The History of Sir Charles Grandison.

== Births ==
- 8 March – William Roscoe, abolitionist, writer and collector (died 1831)
- 27 March – Andrew Bell, educationist and priest (died 1832)
- 9 July – William Waldegrave, 1st Baron Radstock, admiral and Governor of Newfoundland (died 1825)
- c. 11 August – Thomas Bewick, wood engraver (died 1828)
- 10 September – John Soane, architect (died 1837)
- 2 October – John Bowles, conservative writer and lawyer (died 1819)
- 22 November – Dugald Stewart, philosopher (died 1828)
- 3 December – Samuel Crompton, inventor (died 1827)
- 12 December – William Beechey, portrait-painter (died 1839)
- Edward Pigott, astronomer (died 1825)

== Deaths ==
- 11 January – Hans Sloane, physician and collector (born 1660 in Ireland)
- 14 January – George Berkeley, philosopher and bishop (born 1685 in Ireland)
- 12 May – William Wishart, Principal of the University of Edinburgh (born c.1692)
- 7 June – Archibald Cameron of Locheil, last Jacobite to be executed for treason (born 1707)
- 27 September – Sir John Anstruther, 1st Baronet, of Anstruther, Scottish politician (born c.1678)
- December – Thomas Melvill, Scottish meteorologist and philosopher (born 1726)
- 4 December – Richard Boyle, 3rd Earl of Burlington, architect (born 1694)
- 25 December – Godolphin Arabian, thoroughbred stallion (foaled c.1724 in Yemen)

== See also ==
- 1753 in Wales
