= 1732 in Wales =

- Centuries: 16th; 17th; 18th; 19th; 20th
- Decades: 1710s; 1720s; 1730s; 1740s; 1750s
- See also: List of years in Wales; Timeline of Welsh history 1732 in Great Britain Scotland Elsewhere

This article is about the particular significance of the year 1732 to Wales and its people.

== Incumbents ==
- Lord Lieutenant of North Wales (Lord Lieutenant of Anglesey, Caernarvonshire, Denbighshire, Flintshire, Merionethshire, Montgomeryshire) – George Cholmondeley, 2nd Earl of Cholmondeley
- Lord Lieutenant of Glamorgan – Charles Powlett, 3rd Duke of Bolton
- Lord Lieutenant of Brecknockshire and Lord Lieutenant of Monmouthshire – Thomas Morgan
- Lord Lieutenant of Cardiganshire – John Vaughan, 2nd Viscount Lisburne
- Lord Lieutenant of Carmarthenshire – – vacant until 1755
- Lord Lieutenant of Pembrokeshire – Sir Arthur Owen, 3rd Baronet
- Lord Lieutenant of Radnorshire – James Brydges, 1st Duke of Chandos
- Bishop of Bangor – Thomas Sherlock
- Bishop of Llandaff – John Harris
- Bishop of St Asaph – Thomas Tanner (from 23 January)
- Bishop of St Davids – Nicholas Clagett (from 23 January)

== Events ==
- 23 January - Thomas Tanner becomes Bishop of St Asaph.
- 1 July - Charles Hanbury Williams marries Frances, the daughter of earl Coningsby.
- John Wynne buys the Soughton Hall estate in Northop, Flintshire.
- A mineral spring is discovered at Llanwrtyd Wells by the Rev. Theophilus Evans.
- "Madam" Bridget Bevan begins her correspondence with Griffith Jones (Llanddowror).
- Artist Edward Owen is robbed and beaten in London, receiving serious injuries that contribute to his death some years later.
- Frederick, Prince of Wales, purchases Carlton House in London as his new home.
- Howell Harris becomes a schoolmaster at Llangors.
- Bishop John Wynne purchases the Northop estate in Flintshire.

== Arts and literature ==
=== New books ===
- David Evans - A Help for parents and Heads of families ... by David Evans, a Labourer in the Gospel at Tredyffren in Pennsylvania (published in Philadelphia by B. Franklin)
- Jeremy Owen - Golwg ar y Beiau sydd yn yr Hanes a Brintiwyd ynghylch Pedair i Bump Mlynedd i nawr, ym mherthynas i'r Rhwygiad a wnaethpwyd yn Eglwys Henllan yny Blynyddoedd 1707, 1708, 1709
- David Rees - Adnodau or rai Lleoedd Cableddus a Sarhaus o Lyfrau ... ar Fedydd Plant

== Births ==
- 5 October - Lloyd Kenyon, 1st Baron Kenyon, lawyer and politician (died 1802)
- date unknown - Stafford Prys, bookseller and printer (died 1784)

== Deaths ==
- April - Lady Pryce of Newtown Hall, second wife of Sir John Pryce, 5th baronet
- 4 December - William Baker, former Bishop of Bangor, 64
- 16 December - William Bradshaw, Bishop of Bristol, 61
