= 1735 in Great Britain =

Events from the year 1735 in Great Britain.

== Incumbents ==
- Monarch – George II
- Regent – Caroline, Queen Consort (starting 17 May, until 26 October)
- Prime Minister – Robert Walpole (Whig)

== Events ==
- 2 January – Alexander Pope's poem Epistle to Dr Arbuthnot is published in London.
- 8 January – premiere of George Frideric Handel's opera Ariodante at the Royal Opera House, Covent Garden in London.
- 16 April – London premiere of Alcina by Handel, his first Italian opera for the Royal Opera House.
- 20 April – religious conversion of Howell Harris at Talgarth church, marking a beginning of the Welsh Methodist revival.
- 10 May – Charles Macklin unintentionally kills fellow actor Thomas Hallam after a dispute during a performance at the Theatre Royal, Drury Lane in London. He is later tried and convicted of manslaughter.
- 22 May – George Hadley publishes the first explanation of the trade winds.
- 25 June – Engraving Copyright Act ('Hogarth's Act') takes effect on being given royal assent, the first of a series of copyright protection laws, to protect original engravings against unauthorized copies.
- 22 September – Robert Walpole moves into 10 Downing Street.
- 14 October – John Wesley and his brother Charles set sail from England for Savannah in the Province of Georgia in British America; on the voyage they first encounter members of the Moravian Church.
- 6 December – the second successful appendectomy is performed by naturalised French-born surgeon Claudius Aymand at St George's Hospital in London (the first was in 1731).

=== Undated ===
- William Hogarth's A Rake's Progress series of paintings are published as engraved prints in London.
- Unscrupulous London publisher Edmund Curll produces Letters of Mr. Pope, and Several Eminent Persons containing forgeries.
- Richard Leveridge writes a melody to Henry Fielding's The Roast Beef of Old England.
- Beau Nash appoints himself master of ceremonies at Tunbridge Wells.

== Births ==
- 8 January – John Jervis, 1st Earl of St Vincent, Royal Navy admiral (died 1823)
- 22 February – Charles Lennox, 3rd Duke of Richmond, politician (died 1806)
- 25 February (bapt.) – William Speechly, horticulturalist (died 1819)
- 10 April (bapt.) – Button Gwinnett, 2nd Governor of Georgia (died 1777)
- 8 May – Nathaniel Dance, portrait painter and politician (died 1811)
- 7 September – Thomas Coutts, banker (died 1822)
- 20 September – James Keir, Scottish-born geologist, chemist and industrialist (died 1820)
- 28 September – Augustus FitzRoy, 3rd Duke of Grafton, Prime Minister (died 1811)
- 21 October – Richard Gough, antiquary (died 1809)
- 10 November – Granville Sharp, abolitionist (died 1813)
- 14 November – John Howie, Scottish biographer (died 1793)
- 29 December – Thomas Banks, sculptor and artist (died 1805)

=== Undated ===
- John Barrow, Catholic priest (died 1811)
- Lumpy Stevens, cricketer (died 1819)

== Deaths ==
- 12 January – John Eccles, composer (born 1668)
- 27 February – John Arbuthnot, physician and author (born 1667)
- 29 March – Emanuel Howe, 2nd Viscount Howe, politician and colonial administrator (born 1700)
- 5 April – William Derham, minister and writer (born 1657)
- 25 April – Samuel Wesley, poet and religious leader (born 1662)
- 10 June – Thomas Hearne, antiquarian (born 1678)
- 14 December – Thomas Tanner, bishop and antiquarian (born 1674)

== See also ==
- 1735 in Wales
