= 1771 in Great Britain =

Events from the year 1771 in Great Britain.

== Incumbents ==
- Monarch – George III
- Prime Minister – Frederick North, Lord North (Tory)

== Events ==
- 22 January – Spain cedes the Falkland Islands to Britain.
- 15 March – Society of Civil Engineers first meets (in London), the world's oldest engineering society.
- 12 July – first voyage of James Cook (begun 1768): HMS Endeavour anchors in The Downs, and Captain Cook goes ashore at Deal, Kent, following his global circumnavigation.
- 8 August – first recorded town cricket match played at Horsham; Horsham Cricket Club formed here soon after 1806.
- 17 August – Edinburgh botanist James Robertson makes the first recorded ascent of Ben Nevis.
- 30 September – Bath Assembly Rooms completed.
- 2 October – Prince Henry, Duke of Cumberland and Strathearn, brother to the King, marries a commoner, the widow Anne Horton, in Mayfair, precipitating the Royal Marriages Act 1772.
- 16 November – Several rivers flood in northern England, destroying many bridges and killing several people.

=== Undated ===
- Industrial Revolution: Richard Arkwright begins to develop cotton mills at Cromford in the Derwent Valley of Derbyshire, one of the earliest factory complexes.
- Harewood House, West Yorkshire, completed to the designs of John Carr and Robert Adam.
- Warren Hastings of the British East India Company becomes governor of Bengal in India.
- St George's Circus intersection built in London.
- Norfolk and Norwich Hospital founded.
- Edinburgh Society of Bowlers codifies the modern rules for bowls.

== Publications ==
- Sir John Dalrymple's history Memoirs of Great Britain and Ireland from the dissolution of the last parliament of Charles II until the sea battle of La Hogue, first revealing the 1670 Secret Treaty of Dover.
- Encyclopædia Britannica completes publication.
- Henry Mackenzie's novel The Man of Feeling.
- Tobias Smollett's novel The Expedition of Humphry Clinker.
- Peter Williams (1722–1796)'s Hymns on Various Subjects (includes "Prayer for Strength", the first English translation of the Welsh hymn "Cwm Rhondda").
- Arthur Young's The Farmer's Kalendar.
- Allegri's Miserere.

== Births ==
- 5 February – John Lingard, Roman Catholic priest (died 1851)
- 13 April – Richard Trevithick, Cornish inventor (died 1833)
- 3 June – Sydney Smith, writer and clergyman (died 1845)
- 7 July – John Britton, antiquary and topographer (died 1857)
- 15 August – Walter Scott, Scottish novelist and poet (died 1832)
- 22 August – Henry Maudslay, mechanical engineer (died 1831)
- 11 September – Mungo Park, Scottish explorer of West Africa (died 1806)
- 25 December – Dorothy Wordsworth, poet and diarist (died 1855)

== Deaths ==
- 5 January – John Russell, Duke of Bedford, statesman (born 1710)
- 21 May – Christopher Smart, poet (born 1722)
- 8 June – Lord Halifax, statesman (born 1716)
- 30 July – Thomas Gray, writer (born 1716)
- 17 September – Tobias Smollett, Scottish-born novelist (born 1721)
- 6 November – John Bevis, physician and astronomer (born 1695)
- 15 December – Benjamin Stillingfleet, botanist (born 1702)

== See also ==
- 1771 in Wales
