= 1731 in Wales =

- Centuries: 16th; 17th; 18th; 19th; 20th
- Decades: 1710s; 1720s; 1730s; 1740s; 1750s
- See also: List of years in Wales; Timeline of Welsh history 1731 in Great Britain Scotland Elsewhere

This article is about the particular significance of the year 1731 to Wales and its people.

== Incumbents ==
- Lord Lieutenant of North Wales (Lord Lieutenant of Anglesey, Caernarvonshire, Denbighshire, Flintshire, Merionethshire, Montgomeryshire) – George Cholmondeley, 2nd Earl of Cholmondeley
- Lord Lieutenant of Glamorgan – Charles Powlett, 3rd Duke of Bolton
- Lord Lieutenant of Brecknockshire and Lord Lieutenant of Monmouthshire – Sir William Morgan of Tredegar(until 24 April); Thomas Morgan (from 18 June)
- Lord Lieutenant of Cardiganshire – John Vaughan, 2nd Viscount Lisburne
- Lord Lieutenant of Carmarthenshire – vacant until 1755
- Lord Lieutenant of Pembrokeshire – Sir Arthur Owen, 3rd Baronet
- Lord Lieutenant of Radnorshire – James Brydges, 1st Duke of Chandos
- Bishop of Bangor – Thomas Sherlock
- Bishop of Llandaff – John Harris
- Bishop of St Asaph – Francis Hare (until 25 November)
- Bishop of St Davids – Richard SmalbrokeElias Sydall (11 April to 2 November)

== Events ==
- April - Trader Robert Jenkins has his ear cut off by Spanish coast guards in Cuba leading to the War of Jenkins' Ear in 1739.
- September 22 - Griffith Jones (Llanddowror) writes to the SPCK proposing that a Welsh school be set up at Llanddowror. This marks the beginning of the circulating schools movement.

== Arts and literature ==
=== New books ===
- Humphrey Lhuyd - Britannicae Descriptionis Commentariolum
- Edward Samuel - Athrawiaeth yr Eglwys

=== Other ===
- 23 April - Henry Fielding's latest work, The Welsh Opera, is performed in Haymarket. It includes personal attacks on Frederick, Prince of Wales.

== Births ==
- 20 May - Evan Evans (Ieuan Fardd), poet (died 1788)
- date unknown
  - Siôn Robert Lewis, author and hymn-writer (died 1806)
  - Aaron Williams, composer (died 1776)

== Deaths ==
- January - Thomas Jones of Lincoln's Inn, founder of the Honourable and Loyal Society of Antient Britons
- 6 April - David Lloyd, Welsh-born American lawyer, 74
- 24 April - William Morgan of Tredegar (the elder), Lord Lieutenant of Brecknockshire and Monmouthshire, 31
- September - Rowland Ellis, Quaker leader, 81 (in America)
- 4 September - John Roberts, MP for Denbigh, 59?
- 9 October - William Stanley, Dean of St Asaph, 85
