= 1720 in Great Britain =

Events from the year 1720 in Great Britain.

== Incumbents ==
- Monarch – George I

== Events ==
- 10 February – Edmond Halley is appointed Astronomer Royal by George I
- 17 February – Treaty of The Hague signed between Britain, France, Austria, the Dutch Republic and Spain ending the War of the Quadruple Alliance.
- April – "South Sea Bubble": A scheme for the South Sea Company to take over most of Britain's unconsolidated government debt massively inflates share prices.
- 15 April – Ralph Allen of Bath is appointed to farm Cross and Bye Posts (i.e. to manage mail not going via London), leading to his reform of the system.
- 23 April (St George's Day) – George I publicly reconciles with his son George, Prince of Wales at St James's Palace
- 1 June – British silversmiths are once again allowed to use sterling silver after 24 years of being limited to a purer (but softer) Britannia silver.
- 11 June
  - Robert Walpole and his ally and brother-in-law Charles Townshend rejoin the government as Paymaster of the Forces and Lord President of the Council ending the Whig Split lasting since 1717. Within a year they will be Prime Minister and Northern Secretary respectively.
  - Parliament approves the Bubble Act (formally the Royal Exchange and London Assurance Corporation Act 1719), prohibiting the formation of joint-stock companies except by royal charter.
- 25 June – "South Sea Bubble" reaches its peak as South Sea Company stock is priced at £1,060 a share.
- 12 July – Under authority of the Bubble Act, the Lords Justices attempt to curb some of the excesses of the stock markets during the "South Sea Bubble". They dissolve a number of petitions for patents and charters, and abolish more than 80 joint-stock companies of dubious merit, but this has little effect on the creation of "Bubbles", ephemeral joint-stock companies created during the hysteria of the times.
- September – "South Sea Bubble": share prices, led by those of the South Sea Company, collapse.
- 16 November – Pirate captain John Rackham (captured on 22 October) is brought to trial at Spanish Town in Jamaica; he is hanged at Port Royal two days later. Most of his crew is also hanged but female pirates Mary Read and Anne Bonny are spared.
- 29 December – Haymarket Theatre opens in London.

== Publications ==
- Richard Mead's treatise A Short Discourse concerning Pestilential Contagion, and the Method to be used to prevent it.

== Births ==
- 13 January – Richard Hurd, bishop and writer (died 1808)
- 27 January (bapt.) – Samuel Foote, dramatist and actor (died 1777)
- 9 March – Philip Yorke, 2nd Earl of Hardwicke, politician (died 1790)
- 8 May - William Cavendish, 4th Duke of Devonshire, Prime Minister (died 1764)
- 18 July – Gilbert White, naturalist and cleric (died 1793)
- 18 August – Laurence Shirley, 4th Earl Ferrers, murderer (died 1760)
- 30 August – Samuel Whitbread, brewer and politician (died 1796)
- 31 December – Charles Edward Stuart, pretender to the British throne (died 1788)

== Deaths ==
- 31 January – Thomas Grey, 2nd Earl of Stamford, privy councillor (born c. 1645)
- 20 April – George Gordon, 1st Earl of Aberdeen, Lord Chancellor of Scotland (born 1637)
- 5 August – Anne Finch, Countess of Winchilsea, English poet (born 1661)
- 9 August – Simon Ockley, orientalist (born 1678)
- 18 August – Matthew Aylmer, 1st Baron Aylmer, admiral (born c. 1650)
- 18 November – John Rackham, pirate

== See also ==
- 1720 in Wales
