= 1883 in the United Kingdom =

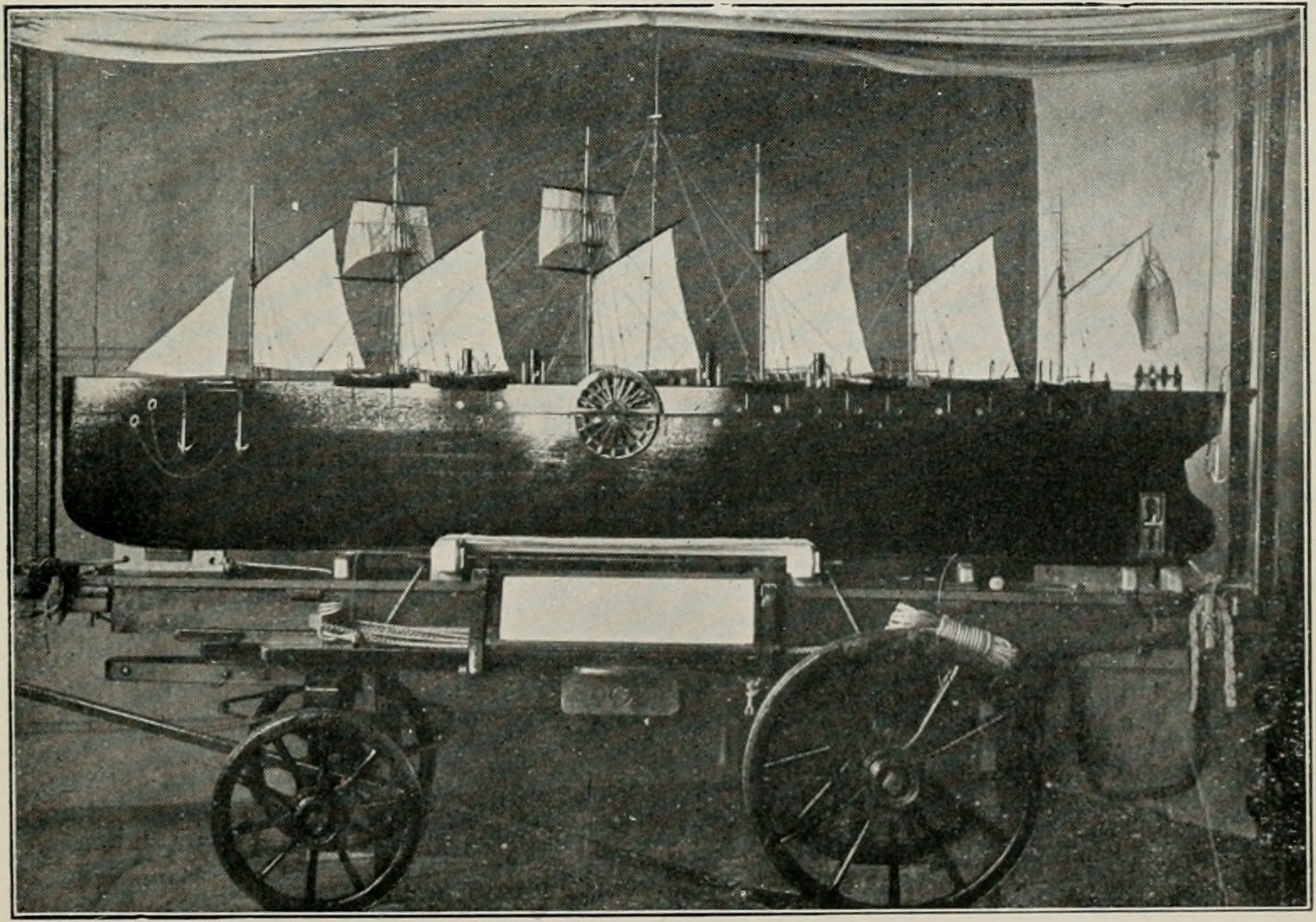
The Great Eastern, with its carriage, as exhibited at the Fisheries Exhibition, 1883

Events from the year 1883 in the United Kingdom.

== Incumbents ==
- Monarch – Victoria
- Prime Minister – William Ewart Gladstone (Liberal)

== Events ==
- 1 January – Augustus Pitt Rivers takes office as Britain's first Inspector of Ancient Monuments.
- 5 March – Gloucester City A.F.C. is formed.
- 15 March – Fenian dynamite campaign: An explosion at the Local Government Board, Charles Street, Mayfair (Westminster) causes over £4,000 worth of damage and some minor injuries to people nearby. A second bomb at The Times newspaper offices in Queen Victoria Street, London does not explode.
- 29 March – Edward Benson enthroned as Archbishop of Canterbury.
- 31 March – Blackburn Olympic beat Old Etonians F.C. 2–1 in the FA Cup Final at The Oval, the Etonians being the last amateur team to reach the final and Olympic being the first northern working-class team to do so.
- 7 May – Royal College of Music opens in London with George Grove as first Director.
- 11 May – William Morris registers his Strawberry Thief printed textile design.
- 16 June – Victoria Hall disaster: A rush for treats results in 183 children being asphyxiated in a concert hall in Sunderland.
- 3 July – SS Daphne sinks on launch in Glasgow, leaving 124 dead.
- 1 August – GPO introduces the Parcels Post service.
- 4 August – first electric railway opens, the Volk's Railway at Brighton.
- 13 August – Coventry City F.C. are formed as "Singers F.C."
- 25 August
  - Trial of Lunatics Act permits a criminal on trial to be found guilty but insane.
  - Corrupt and Illegal Practices Prevention Act criminalises attempts to bribe voters in elections and standardises the amount that can be spent on electoral expenses.
- 29 August – Dunfermline Carnegie Library, the first Carnegie library, is opened in Andrew Carnegie's hometown, Dunfermline.
- 11 September – Major Evelyn Baring becomes Consul-General of Egypt under British rule.
- September – Bristol Rovers F.C. is founded as "Black Arabs F.C."
- October
  - GPO officially replaces the title "letter carrier" by "postman".
  - Dunstable Town F.C. formed.
- October–November – Primrose League established in support of the Conservative Party.
- 4 October – the Boys' Brigade is founded in Glasgow. It is the first uniformed youth organisation in existence.
- 24 October – Cardiff University opens under the name of University College of South Wales and Monmouthshire.
- 30 October – two Clan na Gael dynamite bombs explode in the London Underground, injuring several people. Next day Home Secretary William Vernon Harcourt drafts 300 policemen to guard the Underground and introduces the Explosives Bill.
- 3 November–5 November – Mahdist War: Anglo-Egyptian forces defeated at the Battle of El Obeid in Sudan.
- Undated
  - Home and Colonial Stores established as grocers, in London.
  - Potter Thomas Twyford invents his 'Unitas' single-piece ceramic pedestal (free-standing) flush toilet.

== Publications ==
- G. A. Henty's novels Friends Though Divided: a tale of the Civil War, Jack Archer: a tale of the Crimea and Under Drake's Flag: a tale of the Spanish Main.
- William Robinson's gardening book The English Flower Garden.
- J. R. Seeley's study of the growth of the British Empire The Expansion of England.
- Robert Louis Stevenson's historical adventure novels Treasure Island (in book form) and The Black Arrow (in serial form).

== Sport ==
=== Rugby football ===
- England, Ireland, Scotland and Wales take part in the inaugural Home Nations Championship.

== Births ==
- 1 January – Mary Forbes, actress (died 1974)
- 3 January – Clement Attlee, Prime Minister of the United Kingdom (died 1967)
- 16 January – Oswald Short, aviation pioneer and aircraft builder, youngest of the Short Brothers (died 1969)
- 17 January – Compton Mackenzie, novelist and Scottish nationalist (died 1972)
- 20 January – Bertram Ramsay, admiral (died 1945)
- 15 February – Sax Rohmer, author (died 1959)
- 16 February – Elizabeth Craig, cookery writer (died 1980)
- 25 February – Princess Alice, Countess of Athlone, member of the royal family (died 1981)
- 17 March – Pat O'Keeffe, middleweight boxer (died 1960)
- 19 March – Walter Haworth, chemist, Nobel Prize laureate (died 1950)
- 28 March – William Henry Harris, organist, choral trainer and composer (died 1973)
- 19 May – George Cholmondeley, 5th Marquess of Cholmondeley, Lord Great Chamberlain (died 1968)
- 5 June – John Maynard Keynes, economist (died 1946)
- 1 July – Arthur Borton, soldier, Victoria Cross recipient (died 1933)
- 20 July – Catherine Bramwell-Booth, Salvation Army commissioner (died 1987)
- 23 July – Stuart Paton, screenwriter and film director (died 1944)
- 29 July – Fred Pentland, footballer and coach (died 1962)
- 23 August – Jesse Pennington, footballer (died 1970)
- 8 November – Arnold Bax, composer (died 1953)
- 25 November – Percy Marmont, actor (died 1977)

== Deaths ==
- 9 March – Arnold Toynbee, economic historian (born 1852)
- 14 March – Karl Marx, political philosopher and economist (born 1818 in Germany)
- 14 April – William Farr, epidemiologist (born 1807)
- 18 April – Elizabeth Ferard, Anglican deaconess (born 1825)
- 28 April – Jack Russell, dog breeder (born 1795)
- 13 May – James Young, Scottish chemist (born 1811)
- 20 May – William Chambers of Glenormiston, Scottish publisher and politician (born 1800)
- 11 June – Caroline Leigh Gascoigne, poet and novelist (born 1813)
- 14 June – Edward FitzGerald, poet (born 1809)
- 23 June – Sir William Knollys, general (born 1797)
- 23 July – Rose Massey, actress (died of consumption in the United States) (born c. 1845)
- 24 July – Matthew Webb, first recorded person to swim the English Channel unaided (died in swim at Niagara Falls) (born 1848)
- 26 July – Sir William Fenwick Williams, general (born 1800)
- 6 October – William Beresford, politician (born 1797)
- 14 October – Sir Arthur Elton, 7th Baronet, writer and Liberal politician (born 1818)
- 20 October – George Chichester, 3rd Marquess of Donegall, Anglo-Irish landowner, courtier and politician (born 1797)
- 19 November – Sir Charles William Siemens, electrical engineer (born 1823 in Germany)
- 26 December – Thomas Holloway, pharmacist and philanthropist (born 1800)
- Margaret Agnes Bunn, actress (born 1799)
