= 1880 in the United Kingdom =

Events from the year 1880 in the United Kingdom.

== Incumbents ==
- Monarch – Victoria
- Prime Minister – Benjamin Disraeli (Conservative) (until 21 April), William Ewart Gladstone (Liberal) (starting 23 April)

== Events ==
- January–March – great fog continues to engulf London.
- 21 January – an underground firedamp explosion at Fair Lady Pit, Leycett, in the North Staffordshire Coalfield, kills 62 coal miners.
- 31 January – training frigate HMS Atalanta leaves Bermuda bound for Falmouth but is lost in the Atlantic with all 281 on board.
- 2 February – the first successful shipment of frozen mutton from Australia arrives in London aboard the SS Strathleven.
- 8 March – the Conservative Party lose the general election to the Liberal Party.
- 19 March – Rev. Sidney Faithorn Green is imprisoned for over 2 years in Lancaster Castle and will be deprived of his parish in Manchester as a result of proceedings under the Public Worship Regulation Act 1874.
- 3 April – Gilbert and Sullivan's comic opera The Pirates of Penzance has its London debut at the Opera Comique on the Strand.
- 18 April – William Ewart Gladstone succeeds Benjamin Disraeli as Prime Minister. This is Gladstone's second term as prime minister.
- 19 April – Second Anglo-Afghan War: British victory at the Battle of Ahmed Khel.
- 20 April – Victoria University chartered and incorporates Owens College, Manchester.
- 20 May – foundation stone laid for Truro Cathedral in Cornwall, the first to be built on a new site since the 13th century.
- 15 July – an underground firedamp explosion at Risca Colliery in the Crosskeys district of Monmouthshire kills 120 coal miners and 69 horses.
- 27 July – Second Anglo-Afghan War: Afghan victory at the Battle of Maiwand.
- 2 August – Time in the United Kingdom: Greenwich Mean Time adopted as the legal standard throughout Great Britain by the Statutes (Definition of Time) Act.
- 26 August – Elementary Education Act ("Mundella's Act") enforces school attendance up to the age of ten in England and Wales.
- 1 September – Second Anglo-Afghan War: British victory at the Battle of Kandahar.
- 6–8 September – first cricket Test match held in Britain.
- 8 September – an underground explosion at Seaham Colliery, County Durham, kills 164 coal miners.
- October – Irish tenants ostracise landholder's agent Charles Boycott.
- 29 October – Wells lifeboat disaster: RNLI life-boat Eliza Adams of Wells-next-the-Sea, Norfolk, capsizes on service; 11 of 13 crew lost.
- 17 November – the University of London awards the first degrees to women.
- 27 November – Rev. Richard Enraght is imprisoned for 49 days in Warwick Prison and deprived of his parish in Birmingham as a result of proceedings under the Public Worship Regulation Act 1874.
- 10 December – an underground firedamp explosion at Naval Steam Colliery, Penygraig, in the Rhondda, kills 101 coal miners.
- 15 December – first performance of a play by Henrik Ibsen in English, The Pillars of Society (under the title Quicksands) at the Gaiety Theatre, London.
- 16 December
  - High Court of Justice reorganised into the Chancery, Queen's Bench and the Probate, Divorce and Admiralty Divisions, with abolition of the Common Pleas and Exchequer Divisions.
  - The Boers declare independence in Transvaal triggering the First Boer War.
- 20 December – First Boer War: British forces defeated in the action at Bronkhorstspruit.
- 24 December – first festival of Nine Lessons and Carols devised by Edward White Benson, at this time Bishop of Truro.

=== Undated ===
- Foundation of the David Greig provision merchant chain in London.
- A. & R. Scott begin producing the predecessor of Scott's Porage Oats in Scotland.

== Publications ==
- Benjamin Disraeli's novel Endymion.
- Amelia Edwards' novel Lord Brackenbury.
- Thomas Hardy's novel The Trumpet-Major.

== Births ==
- 28 January – Bert Strudwick, cricketer (died 1970)
- 8 February – Arthur Greenwood, politician (died 1954)
- 17 February – Reginald Farrer, botanist (died 1920)
- 1 March – Lytton Strachey, biographer and critic, member of the Bloomsbury Group (died 1932)
- 6 March – Jameson Adams, Antarctic explorer, Royal Navy officer and civil servant (died 1962)
- 17 April – Leonard Woolley, archaeologist (died 1960)
- 30 April – Charles Exeter Devereux Crombie, cartoonist (died 1967)
- 25 May – Alf Common, footballer (died 1946)
- 21 June – Josiah Stamp, 1st Baron Stamp, economist (died 1941)
- 12 August – Radclyffe Hall, author and poet (died 1943)
- 13 August – Mary Macarthur, trade unionist (died 1921)
- 23 August – Wyndham Standing, English actor (died 1963)
- 16 September – Alfred Noyes, poet (died 1958)
- 22 September – Christabel Pankhurst, suffragette (died 1958)
- 23 September – John Boyd Orr, physician and biologist, recipient of the Nobel Peace Prize (died 1971)
- 15 October – Marie Stopes, birth control advocate, suffragette and palaeontologist (died 1958)
- 28 October – Saxon Sydney-Turner, civil servant, eccentric, member of the Bloomsbury Group (died 1962)
- 2 November – John Foulds, classical music composer (died 1939)
- 9 November – Giles Gilbert Scott, architect (died 1960)
- 10 November – Jacob Epstein, American-born sculptor (died 1959)
- 25 November – Elsie J. Oxenham, children's novelist (died 1960)

== Deaths ==
- 27 January – Edward Middleton Barry, architect (born 1830)
- 2 February – Sir George Hamilton Seymour, diplomat (born 1797)
- 3 April – John Laing, bibliographer and Free Church of Scotland minister (born 1809)
- 12 April – Joseph Brown, Roman Catholic bishop (born 1796)
- 6 May – Charles Meredith, Welsh-born politician in Tasmania (born 1811)
- 10 May – John Goss, church composer (born 1800)
- 27 May – Alfred Swaine Taylor, toxicologist, "father of British forensic medicine" (born 1806)
- 30 May – James Planché, dramatist (born 1796)
- 12 July – Tom Taylor, dramatist and journalist (born 1817)
- 15 August – Adelaide Neilson, actress (born 1848)
- 22 August – Benjamin Ferrey, architect (born 1810)
- 9 September – Charles Lowder, Anglican priest prominent in Anglo-Catholicism and humanitarian (born 1820)
- 18 September – Sir Fitzroy Kelly, lawyer and politician, last Chief Baron of the Exchequer (born 1796)
- 23 September – Geraldine Jewsbury, novelist and woman of letters (born 1812)
- 25 September – John Tarleton, admiral (born 1811)
- 5 October – William Lassell, astronomer (born 1799)
- 30 November – Jeanette Threlfall, hymnwriter (born 1821)
- 22 December – George Eliot (Mary Ann Cross), novelist and woman of letters (born 1819)
- 31 December – John Stenhouse, Scottish chemist (born 1809)
