= 1729 in Great Britain =

Events from the year 1729 in Great Britain.

== Incumbents ==
- Monarch – George II
- Regent – Caroline, Queen Consort (starting 22 May, until 11 September)
- Prime Minister – Robert Walpole (Whig)

== Events ==
- 8 January – Frederick, the eldest son of George II, is made Prince of Wales at the age of 21, a few months after he comes to Britain for the first time after growing up in Hanover. For 23 years, he will be heir apparent to the British throne but dies of a lung injury in 1751.
- 25 February – James Oglethorpe M.P. begins service as the Chairman of the Gaols Committee to investigate the conditions of Britain's gaols and prisons after the death in Fleet Prison of his friend, Robert Castell. The Oglethorpe Committee's report propels him to notability and marks a start to British penal reforms.
- 26 April – the House of Commons is adjourned for lack of a quorum for the first time since one of 40 was fixed in 1640.
- 1 May – a tornado destroys buildings in Sussex and Kent.
- 12 May – six English pirates, including Mary Critchett, seize control of the sloop John and Elizabeth while being transported to America to complete their criminal sentences. They overpower their captors but are later taken in Chesapeake Bay by HMS Shoreham and hanged in August.
- 17 May – Caroline, Queen Consort becomes the first person to rule Great Britain as regent under the Regency Acts, beginning service as the acting monarch when her husband King George II departs Britain for the Electorate of Hanover. Caroline rules until his return in October.
- 25 July – seven of the original eight Lords Proprietor of the Province of Carolina sell their shares back to the British crown.
- September–December – influenza outbreak with very high mortality, estimated at more than 6,500 deaths.
- 9 November – Treaty of Seville signed between Great Britain, France, Spain and the Dutch Republic.
- 28 November – theologian Thomas Woolston is convicted of blasphemy and sentenced to prison for the remaining four years of his life on account of his published Discourses on Biblical literalism.
- 29 November – completion of the first (wooden) Putney Bridge as the only fixed crossing of the River Thames between London Bridge and Kingston.

=== Undated ===
- Act for the Better Regulation and Government of Seamen in the Merchants Service is passed
- Chiswick House in London, a pioneering example of English Palladian revival architecture, is designed by its owner Richard Boyle with William Kent.
- Opening of Dr Williams's Library in London as a research centre for nonconformist theology.

== Publications ==
- Robert Samber's fairy tales Histories or Tales of Past Times, told by Mother Goose (translated from Charles Perrault).
- Jonathan Swift's satire A Modest Proposal.

== Births ==
- 13 April – Thomas Percy, ballad collector, translator and bishop (passed 1811)
- 8 June – William Tryon, general and Governor of North Carolina and New York (passed 1788)
- 9 June – Thomas Turner, diarist (passed 1793)
- 10 August – William Howe, 5th Viscount Howe, general (passed 1814)
- October – Sir William Pulteney, 5th Baronet, born William Johnstone, Scottish advocate, landowner and politician (passed 1805)
- 6 October – Sarah Crosby, Methodist preacher (passed 1804)
- 10 October – John Moore, Scottish physician and writer (passed 1802)
- David Barclay of Youngsbury, Quaker merchant, businessman and banker (passed 1809)
- Samuel Barrington, admiral (passed 1800)
- William Buchan, Scottish physician (passed 1805)

== Deaths ==
- 19 January – William Congreve, playwright (born 1670)
- 6 March – Sir William Lowther, 1st Baronet, of Swillington, politician (born 1663)
- 21 March – John Law, Scottish economist, died in Venice (born 1671)
- 17 May – Samuel Clarke, philosopher and cleric (born 1675)
- 4 June – Sir John Delaval, 3rd Baronet, politician (born 1654)
- 30 July – Thomas Tufton, 6th Earl of Thanet, politician (born 1644)
- 5 August – Thomas Newcomen, inventor (born 1663)
- 31 August – John Blackadder, Scottish soldier (born 1664)
- 1 September – Richard Steele, essayist, co-founder of The Tatler (born 1672 in Ireland)
- 13 September – Colen Campbell, Scottish-born architect (born 1676)
- 9 October – Richard Blackmore, poet, physician and theologian (born 1654)
- 10 October – Thomas Fairchild, horticulturalist (born 1667?)
- 8 November – Joshua Oldfield, Presbyterian minister (born 1656)
- 13 December – Anthony Collins, philosopher (born 1676)
- Undated – Gershom Carmichael, Scottish philosopher (born 1672)

== See also ==
- 1729 in Wales
