= 1875 in the United Kingdom =

Events from the year 1875 in the United Kingdom.

== Incumbents ==
- Monarch – Victoria
- Prime Minister – Benjamin Disraeli (Conservative)

== Events ==
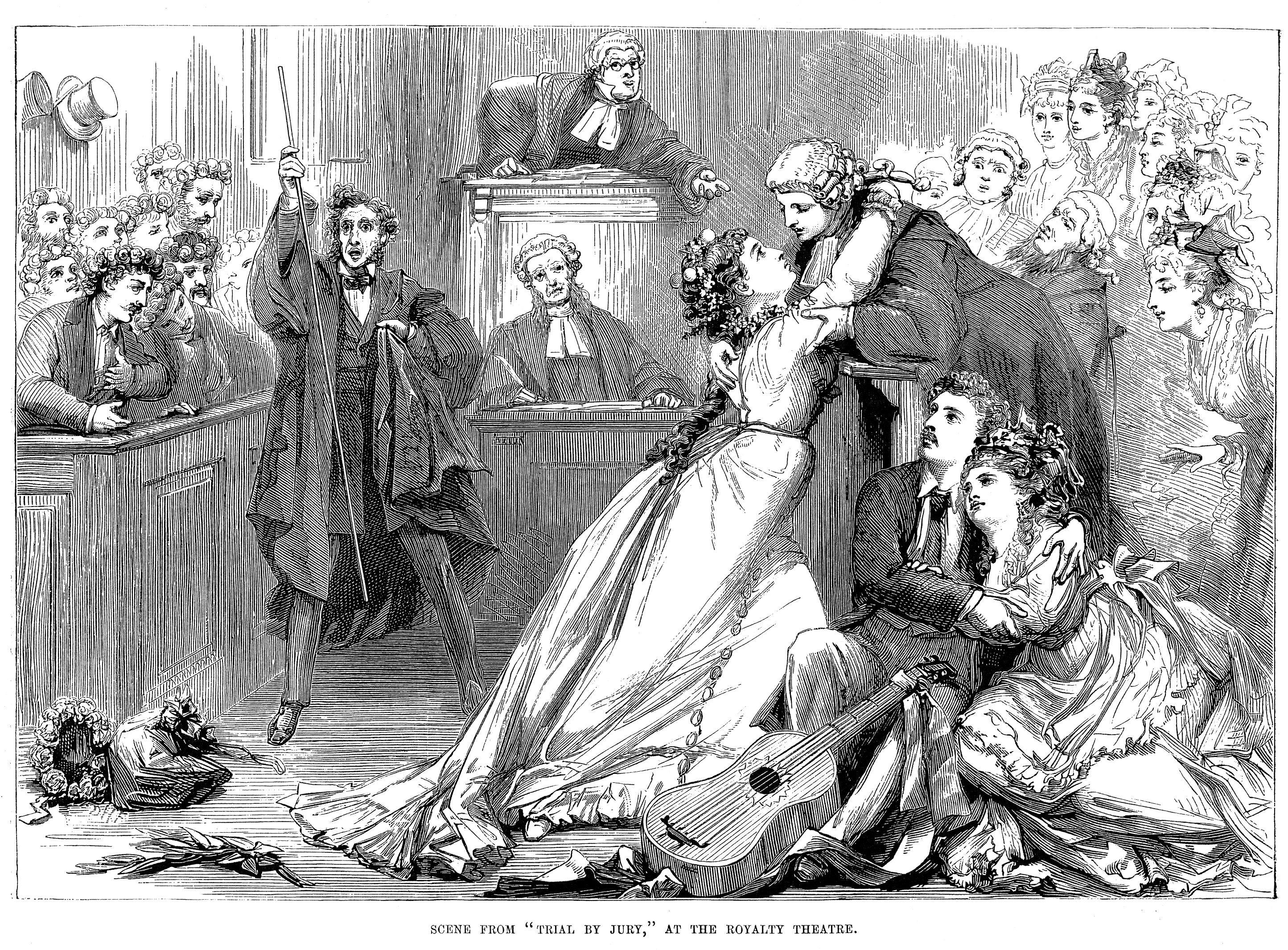
Trial by Jury

- 1 January – the Midland Railway abolishes Second Class, leaving First Class and Third Class, the latter having passenger facilities upgraded to the former Second Class level. Other British railway companies follow this lead during the year and later. (Third Class is renamed Second Class in 1956.)
- 21 January – Preston North End F.C. move into their new stadium at Deepdale.
- 25 March – Trial by Jury, the first surviving Gilbert and Sullivan opera, premières.
- 1 April – The Times publishes the first daily weather map.
- 16 April – Martha Merington becomes the first woman member of a Board of guardians under the Poor Law, in the London Borough of Kensington.
- 7 May – German liner SS Schiller is wrecked on rocks off the Isles of Scilly with the loss of 311 lives.
- 27 May – Standard for the modern British Bulldog breed published.
- 29 May – British Arctic Expedition: George Nares sets sail on an expedition to attempt to reach the North Pole via Smith Sound.
- 29 June – Artisans' and Labourers' Dwellings Improvement Act 1875 is passed to permit slum clearance.
- 6 July – opening of first passenger funicular in the UK, the South Cliff Lift at Scarborough, North Yorkshire.
- 31 July – Public Health Act 1875 (38 & 39 Vict. c. 55) establishes a code of practice for sanitation across the country.
- 6 August – Scottish football team Hibernian F.C. is founded by Irishmen in Edinburgh.
- 11 August
  - Food and Drugs Act makes adulteration of food or drugs an offence.
  - Offences against the Person Act effectively raises the age of consent in England, Wales and Ireland from twelve to thirteen.
- 25 August – Captain Matthew Webb becomes the first person to swim the English Channel.
- 27 September – American merchant sailing ship Ellen Southard is wrecked off Liverpool; 12 crew and life-boatmen are lost.
- September
  - Joseph Bazalgette completes the 30-year construction of London's sewer system.
  - Association football team Birmingham City F.C. is founded as Small Heath Alliance in Birmingham by a group of cricketers from Holy Trinity Church, Bordesley, playing its first match in November.
- 5 November – Blackburn Rovers F.C. is founded by two old-boys of Shrewsbury School following a meeting at the Leger Hotel, Blackburn.
- 26 November – The Times newspaper reveals that Isma'il Pasha has sold Egypt's 44% share in the Suez Canal to Britain in a deal secured by Benjamin Disraeli without the prior sanction of the British Parliament.
- 6 December
  - German emigrant ship SS Deutschland (built in Scotland 1866) runs aground on Kentish Knock resulting in the death of 157 passengers and crew and inspiring Gerard Manley Hopkins' poem The Wreck of the Deutschland.
  - A firedamp explosion at Swaithe Main Colliery in the South Yorkshire Coalfield results in the death of 143 miners.
- At Wimbledon, Henry Cavendish Jones convinces the All England Croquet Club to replace a croquet court with a lawn tennis court.
- William Morris's Acanthus wallpaper design is produced.

== Publications ==
- Helen Mathers' novel Comin' thro' the Rye.
- Anthony Trollope's novel The Way We Live Now.

== Births ==
- 4 January – William Williams, Welsh poet and Archdruid (died 1968)
- 6 February – Cyril Garbett, Anglican prelate, Archbishop of York (died 1955)
- 1 April – Edgar Wallace, born Richard Horatio Edgar, writer (died 1932)
- 12 May – Charles Holden, architect (died 1960)
- 31 May – Rosa May Billinghurst, women's suffrage activist (died 1953)
- 9 June – Henry Hallett Dale, pharmacologist and physiologist, Nobel Prize laureate (died 1968)
- 15 August – Samuel Coleridge-Taylor, composer (died 1912)
- 26 August – John Buchan, Scottish-born novelist and politician (died 1940 in Canada)
- 10 September – John Evans, Welsh politician (died 1961)
- 18 September – Arthur Henry Knighton-Hammond, watercolourist (died 1970)
- 26 September – Eric Geddes, transport manager and politician (died 1937)
- 12 October – Aleister Crowley, occultist (died 1947)
- 26 October – Sir Lewis Casson, actor and theatre director (died 1969)
- 29 October – Princess Marie Alexandra Victoria of Edinburgh, queen consort of Romania (died 1938 in Romania)
- 3 December – Clara Rackham, women's suffrage activist (died 1966)
- 6 December – Evelyn Underhill, writer on Christian mysticism (died 1941)
- 9 December – Grace Hadow, activist for women's advancement (died 1940)
- 20 December – T. F. Powys, Anglo-Welsh writer (died 1953)

== Deaths ==
- 23 January – Charles Kingsley, novelist (born 1819)
- 25 January – George Myers, master builder (born 1803)
- 22 February – Sir Charles Lyell, Scottish geologist (born 1797)
- 7 March
  - Sir James Hope Grant, military leader (born 1808)
  - John Edward Gray, zoologist (born 1800)
- 22 March – Alexander Thomson, architect in the Greek Revival style (born 1817)
- 3 April – William Gibbs, businessman, richest commoner (born 1790)
- 1 May – Alfred Stevens, sculptor (born 1817)
- 22 May – John Sinclair, Archdeacon of Middlesex (born 1797)
- 29 June – Henry Doubleday, entomologist and ornithologist (born 1808)
- 27 July – Connop Thirlwall, bishop (born 1797)
- 19 August – Robert Ellis (Cynddelw), Welsh language poet, biographer, lexicographer and Baptist minister (born 1812)
- 9 September – Sir Charles Elliot, admiral, diplomat and colonial administrator (died 1875)
- 19 October – Sir Charles Wheatstone, physicist (born 1802)
- 29 October – John Gardner Wilkinson, traveller, writer and Egyptologist (born 1797)
- 27 November – Richard Christopher Carrington, astronomer (born 1826)
- 23 December – Charles Frederick, admiral, Third Sea Lord (born 1797)
- 25 December – Young Tom Morris, Scottish golfer (born 1851)
