= Edward Owen (artist) =

Welsh artist

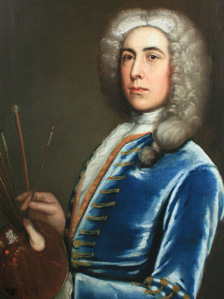
Self-portrait of Edward Owen

Edward Owen (died 1741) was a Welsh artist who held an apprenticeship in London with the artist Thomas Gibson.

Owen was the son of Robert and Ann Owen. His maternal uncle was Dr Edward Wynn (or Wynne) of Bodewryd, who was Chancellor of Hereford Cathedral. Edward Owen had two brothers, William and Hugh; their mother's correspondence with them is held among the Penrhos papers at Bangor University.

Owen died in 1741 from Tuberculosis.
