= 1732 in Great Britain =

Events from the year 1732 in Great Britain.

== Incumbents ==
- Monarch – George II
- Regent – Caroline, Queen Consort (starting 7 June, until 26 September)
- Prime Minister – Robert Walpole (Whig)

== Events ==
- 14 February – first performance of Henry Fielding's comedy The Modern Husband, at the Royal Theatre on Drury Lane in London.
- 3 March – Captain Charles Gough rediscovers Gough Island in the South Atlantic.
- 30 March – MPs John Birch and Denis Bond are expelled from the House of Commons after using their positions on the Commission for Forfeited Lands to make fraudulent sales.
- April–May – first performances of George Frideric Handel's oratorio Esther, the first oratorio in English, in London.
- 9 June – James Oglethorpe is granted a royal charter for the colony of Georgia.
- 7 December – the original Theatre Royal, Covent Garden, London (predecessor of the Royal Opera House) is opened by John Rich.

=== Undated ===
- Act provides that any man after 24 June 1733 charged on oath with being the father of an illegitimate child should be imprisoned until he provides a financial bond to indemnify the parish from liability for it under the Poor Law.
- Secession Church formed in Scotland.
- Trinity House moors the world's first lightship at the Nore in the Thames Estuary.
- The Portsmouth Grammar School is founded under the will of Dr. William Smith, a physician and former Mayor of Portsmouth, by Christ Church, Oxford.

== Births ==
- February – Charles Churchill, satirist and poet (died 1764)
- 19 February – Richard Cumberland, dramatist (died 1811)
- April – George Colman the Elder, dramatist and essayist (died 1794)
- 13 April – Frederick North, Lord North, Prime Minister (died 1792)
- 15 August – Maria Coventry, Countess of Coventry, society beauty (died 1760)
- 6 October – Nevil Maskelyne, Astronomer Royal (died 1811)
- 6 December – Warren Hastings, colonial administrator (died 1818)
- 23 December – Richard Arkwright, inventor (died 1792)

== Deaths ==
- 12 January – John Horsley, archaeologist (born c. 1685)
- 22 January – Louis de Sabran, theologian (born 1652)
- 6 February – Anne Scott, 1st Duchess of Buccleuch, wealthy Scottish peeress (born 1651)
- 7 February – William Hiseland, soldier, reputed supercentenarian (born 1620)
- 22 February – Francis Atterbury, bishop and man of letters (born 1663)
- 20 May – Thomas Boston, Scottish church leader (born 1676)
- 30 May – John King, churchman (born 1652)
- 1 June – Benedict Leonard Calvert, Governor of Maryland (born 1700)
- 16 July – Woodes Rogers, privateer and first Royal Governor of the Bahamas (born c. 1679)
- 6 October – George Duckett, politician (born 1684)
- 26 November – Charles Sergison, politician (born 1655)
- 4 December – John Gay, poet and dramatist (born 1685)

== See also ==
- 1732 in Wales
