= Mary Lacy =

- Born: 1740; Wickham, Kent
- Died: 1801 (aged 60–61)
- Known for: First woman to complete a shipwright's apprenticeship
- Notable work: The Female Shipwright

Mary Lacy (c. 1740 – 1801) was a British sailor, shipwright, and memoirist. She was arguably the first woman to have been given an exam and a pension from the British Admiralty as a shipwright.

== Early life ==
Lacy was born in Wickham, Kent, in 1740. She became a domestic servant at the age of twelve. In 1759, aged nineteen, Lacy ran away from home dressed as a boy. Using the name William Chandler, Lacy worked as a servant for a ship's carpenter of the Royal Navy. William was her father's name, and Chandler was her mother's maiden name.

Lacy then studied as an apprentice to be a shipwright in 1763, going on to successfully complete the apprenticeship. In 1770, she took her exam as a shipwright, arguably the first woman to have done so. In 1771, however, she was forced to stop working because of her rheumatism and applied for a pension from the Admiralty under her legal name, Mary Lacy, which was granted. She published her memoirs, The Female Shipwright, in 1773. This was reprinted by the National Maritime Museum in 2008.

== Later life ==
On 25 October 1772, at St Mary Abbots, Kensington, Mary Lacy married Josias Slade, a shipwright, of Deptford, Kent. That same year, Mary gave birth to her first child, Margaret Lacey Slade, who was baptized at St Nicholas, Deptford, Kent, on 29 August. Their other children were Josias Slade (1775–1777), Mary Slade (1777–1777), Josias Slade (1778–1781), Elizabeth Slade (1780–1780), and John Slade (born 1784).

In 1775, Mary petitioned for her husband to be granted a servant because of his 16 years' service as a shipwright. She had also applied unsuccessfully before Lord Sandwich for her husband to succeed Thomas Boyles, who lined the stuff for the Sawyers at the dockyard.

Mary died in 1801 and was buried at St Paul's, Deptford, Kent, on 3 May 1801. Her husband, Josias Slade, died in 1814 and was also buried at St Paul, Deptford, Kent, on 13 February 1814. In his will and codicil, he only mentions his son, John Slade, and daughter, Margaret, now wife of Joseph Ward (Margaret Lacey Ward died the following year and was buried at St Paul, Deptford, Kent, on 23 April 1815).

A chapter in Suzanne Stark's book Female Tars: Women Aboard Ship in the Age of Sail features Lacy's life in eighteenth-century England.

== Published works ==
- The Female Shipwright. National Maritime Museum. 2008. ISBN 9781906367015.
