= 1801 in the United Kingdom =

The following events occurred in the United Kingdom in the year 1801. The Acts of Union 1800 came into force this year.

== Incumbents ==
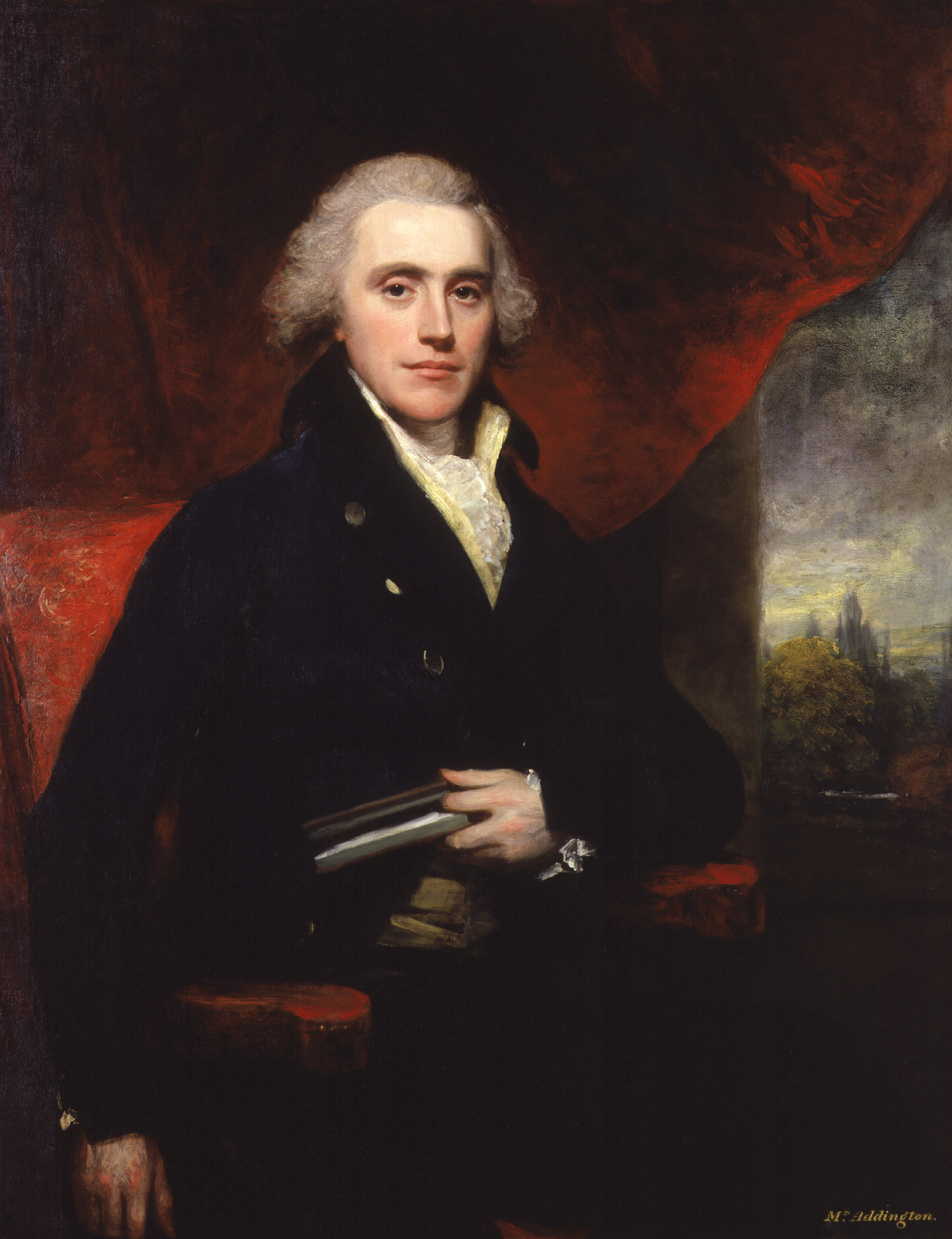
Portrait of Henry Addington by William Beechey.

- Monarch – George III
- Prime Minister – William Pitt the Younger (Tory) (until 14 March), Henry Addington (Tory) (starting 14 March)
- Foreign Secretary – Lord Grenville (until 20 February) Lord Hawkesbury (starting 20 February)
- Secretary of War – Lord Hobart (from 17 March)

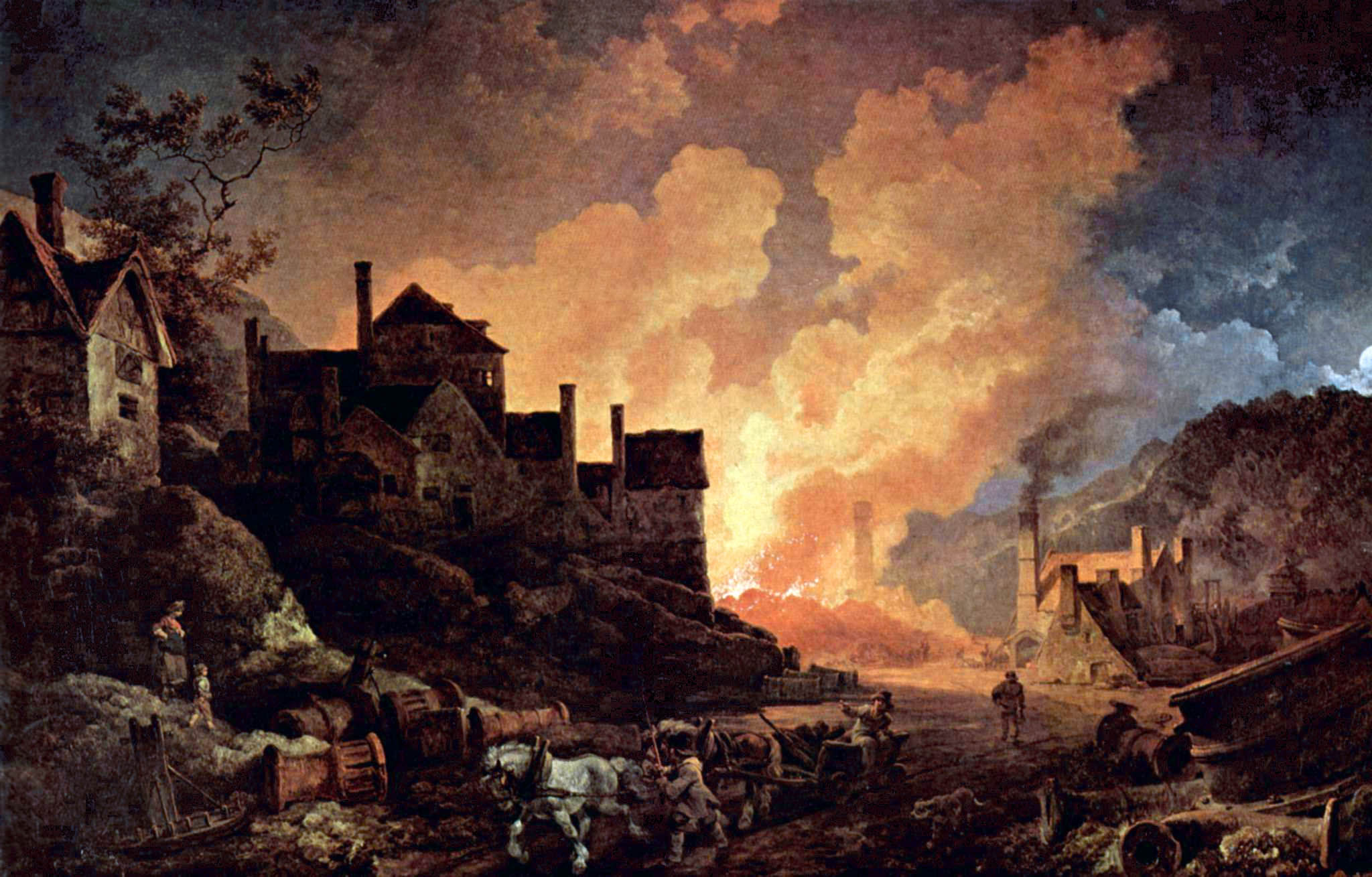
Philip James de Loutherbourg's Coalbrookdale by Night (1801)

== Events ==
- 1 January
  - Legislative union of Great Britain and Ireland completed under the Act of Union 1800, bringing about the United Kingdom of Great Britain and Ireland and abolition of the Parliament of Ireland. A revised flag of the United Kingdom is adopted from this date.
  - First one-inch-to-the-mile (1:63,360 scale) map based on the work of the Ordnance Survey is published, covering the county of Kent.
- 14 January – Britain places embargoes on vessels of the Second League of Armed Neutrality of the North.
- 2 February – Parliament of the United Kingdom meets for the first time.
- 5 February – William Pitt the Younger tenders his resignation as Prime Minister of the United Kingdom.
- 1 March – London Stock Exchange founded as a regulated institution; its new building is completed on 30 December.
- 8 March – Second Battle of Abukir: a British Army under Ralph Abercromby defeats the French troops.
- 10 March – The first British census is carried out. The count is conducted by clergy, overseers of the poor and schoolmasters. The population of England and Wales is determined to be 8.9 million, with London revealed to have 860,035 residents.
- 14 March – William Pitt the Younger resigns over the failure to introduce Catholic emancipation, having first tendered his resignation on 5 February.
- 16 March – Edinburgh music teacher Anne Gunn is granted the first British patent for a board game, designed as a music teaching aid.
- 17 March – Henry Addington, 1st Viscount Sidmouth becomes Prime Minister.
- 21 March – Battle of Alexandria: Abercromby's forces defeat those of the French in the Egyptian city of Alexandria.
- 2 April – Battle of Copenhagen in the War of the Second Coalition: The Royal Navy under Admiral Sir Hyde Parker forces the Royal Dano-Norwegian Navy to accept an armistice. Vice-Admiral Horatio Nelson leads the main attack, deliberately disregarding his commander's signal to withdraw.
- 19 May – Nelson is created Viscount Nelson of the Nile, and of Burnham Thorpe in the County of Norfolk, for his part in the strategic victory at Copenhagen.
- 18 June – Cairo falls to British troops.
- 6 July – Battle of Algeciras: The French fleet achieves victory over the British.
- 12 July – Second Battle of Algeciras: The British fleet defeats the French and Spanish.
- 18 July – Matthew Flinders sets out on a voyage to produce a detailed survey of the coastline of Australia, the southern coast of which is still unknown.
- 30 September – The Treaty of London is signed for peace between the French First Republic and the United Kingdom as a preliminary to the Treaty of Amiens.
- 24 November – The Duke of Sussex first conferred, on Prince Augustus Frederick.
- 26 November – Charles Hatchett announces his discovery of the chemical element niobium to the Royal Society.
- 24 December – Richard Trevithick demonstrates the first steam-powered vehicle to carry passengers at Camborne.

=== Ongoing ===
- Anglo-Spanish War, 1796–1808
- French Revolutionary Wars, War of the Second Coalition

=== Undated ===
- Dalton's law: John Dalton observes that the total pressure exerted by a gaseous mixture is equal to the sum of the partial pressures of each individual component in a gas mixture.
- Thomas Young discovers the interference of light.
- Maria Edgeworth's novel Belinda is published.
- Henry James Pye's epic poem Alfred is published.
- 219 people are hanged this year in England and Wales, a record for any year after 1785.
- Artist Thomas Lawrence paints a portrait of the Princess of Wales and her daughter which in 1806 involves him in the "Delicate Investigation".

== Births ==
- 4 January – James Giles, painter (died 1870)
- 14 January – Jane Welsh Carlyle, letter–writer (died 1866)
- 2 February
  - Manton Eastburn, bishop in the Episcopal Church (United States) (died 1872)
  - George Maclean, Governor of Cape Coast (died 1847)
- 7 February – John Rylands, weaver, entrepreneur and philanthropist (died 1888)
- 13 February – Henry Bulwer, 1st Baron Dalling and Bulwer, politician, diplomat and writer (died 1872)
- 21 February – John Henry Newman, Roman Catholic Cardinal, canonised (died 1890)
- 24 April – Robert Grosvenor, 1st Baron Ebury, politician (died 1893)
- 28 April – Anthony Ashley-Cooper, 7th Earl of Shaftesbury, politician and philanthropist (died 1885)
- 9 May – Samuel Cousins, engraver (died 1887)
- 4 June – James Pennethorne, architect (died 1871)
- 10 June – Joseph Rowntree, educationist (died 1859)
- 24 June – Caroline Clive, author (died 1873)
- 15 August – Charles Elliot, naval officer, diplomat and colonial administrator (died 1875)
- 27 December – Charles Clay, surgeon (died 1893)
- date unknown – Charles George James Arbuthnot, general, born at sea (died 1870)

== Deaths ==
- 28 March – Ralph Abercromby, general (born 1734)
- 2 April – Thomas Dadford, Jr., engineer (year of birth unknown)
- 3 May (bur.) – Mary Lacy, shipwright and naval pensioner (born c.1740)
- 17 May – William Heberden, physician (born 1710)
- 14 June – Benedict Arnold, spy and Army officer (born 1741 in Connecticut Colony)
- 7 July – William Legge, 2nd Earl of Dartmouth, statesman (born 1731)
- 9 September – Gilbert Wakefield, scholar (born 1756)
- Autumn – David Levi, scholar (born 1742)
