= 1869 in the United Kingdom =

Events from the year 1869 in the United Kingdom.

== Incumbents ==
- Monarch – Victoria
- Prime Minister – William Ewart Gladstone (Liberal)

== Events ==
- 7 January – Amateur Swimming Association formed in London.
- 30 January – the new magazine Vanity Fair publishes the first of a long series of colour lithographic caricatures of public figures, initially by Carlo Pellegrini, portraying Benjamin Disraeli.
- February – Charity Organization Society established in London as the Society for Organising Charitable Relief and Repressing Mendicity.
- February–April – the Conservative local authority in Liverpool opens the first council housing in Europe, St Martin's Cottages (tenement flats).
- 6 March – the first international cycle race is held at Crystal Palace, London.
- 31 March – the Conservative Party holds both seats in the Blackburn by-election.
- 21 April – at least fifteen people are killed by collapse of machinery at Delabole Quarry in Cornwall.
- 15 May – General Examination for Women of the University of London first held, sat by the "London Nine".
- 22 May – Sainsbury's first store opened, in Drury Lane, London.
- 2 June – seven men are tried at Mold for attacking a colliery manager following a pay cut. A riot breaks out as those convicted are being transported to the railway station; soldiers fire on the crowd, killing four people.
- 10 June – an underground explosion at Ferndale Colliery in the Rhondda kills 53.
- 24 June – Sea Birds Preservation Act 1869 passed, preventing killing of designated species during the breeding season, the first act to offer any protection to wild birds in the UK.
- 26 July – Irish Church Act 1869 disestablishes the Church of Ireland with effect from 1871.
- 2 August – Municipal Corporation (Elections) Act 1869 (also known as the Municipal Franchise Act 1869) restores to unmarried women ratepayers the franchise to vote in local elections and enables them to become poor law guardians, through an amendment moved by John Bright.
- 9 August
  - Debtors Act 1869 abolishes indefinite imprisonment for civil debt in England and Wales with effect from 1870.
  - Evidence (Further) Amendment Act 1869 permits those taking part in legal proceedings to make an affirmation if they conscientiously object to taking an oath.
- 27 August – Oxford University Boat Club wins the first international boat race held on the River Thames against Harvard University.
- October – the 'Edinburgh Seven', led by Sophia Jex-Blake, start to attend lectures at the University of Edinburgh Medical School, the first women in the UK to do so (although they will not be allowed to take degrees).
- 11 October – Red River Rebellion against British forces in Canada.
- 16 October – England's first residential university-level women's college, the College for Women, predecessor of Girton College, Cambridge, is founded at Hitchin by Emily Davies and Barbara Bodichon and admits its first five students.
- 4 November – the first issue of scientific journal Nature is published in London, edited by Norman Lockyer.
- 19 November – the Hudson's Bay Company surrenders its claim to Rupert's Land in Canada under its letters patent back to the British Crown.
- 22 November – clipper ship Cutty Sark is launched in Dumbarton, Scotland; she is one of the last clippers built, and the only one to survive in the UK.
- 31 December – last day on which the half farthing coin is legal tender in the U.K.
- Undated
  - First Home Children child migration to Canada.
  - Inverness Cathedral (Scottish Episcopal Church) opened for worship as the first new Protestant cathedral to be completed in Great Britain since the Reformation.
  - Thomas Henry Huxley coins the word "Agnostic".

== Publications ==
- Matthew Arnold's collected essays Culture and Anarchy.
- R. M. Ballantyne's novel Erling the Bold.
- R. D. Blackmore's novel Lorna Doone.
- John Stuart Mill's book The Subjection of Women.
- Hesba Stretton's novel Alone in London.
- First year of publication of Joseph Whitaker's An Almanack for the year.
- Charlotte M. Yonge's novel The Chaplet of Pearls.
- The People's Friend weekly magazine launched (13 January).

== Births ==
- 14 January – Dennis Eadie, Scottish-born character actor (died 1928)
- 26 January – George Douglas Brown, novelist (died 1902)
- 12 February – Lady Constance Bulwer-Lytton, suffragette (died 1923)
- 14 February – C. T. R. Wilson, Scottish physicist, Nobel Prize laureate (died 1959)
- 3 March – Henry Wood, conductor (died 1944)
- 14 March – Algernon Blackwood, writer (died 1951)
- 18 March – Neville Chamberlain, Prime Minister (died 1940)
- 27 March – J. R. Clynes, politician (died 1949)
- 29 March – Edwin Lutyens, architect (died 1944)
- 9 May – Tyrone Power Sr., actor (died 1931 in the United States)
- 18 May – Lucy Beaumont, actress (died 1937)
- 7 June – Lamorna Birch, born Samuel John Birch, painter (died 1955)
- 11 June – Walford Bodie, stage magician (died 1939)
- 17 June – Flora Finch, comic performer, silent film star (died 1940 in the United States)
- 19 June – Christopher Addison, anatomist and politician (died 1951)
- 12 July – Conrad Noel, Anglican vicar and socialist (died 1942)
- 13 July – Florence Perry, opera singer (died 1949)
- 10 August – Lawrence Binyon, poet and scholar (died 1943)
- 6 September – Walford Davies, composer (died 1941)
- 24 September – Maud Cunnington, archaeologist (died 1951)
- 3 October – Robert W. Paul, pioneer of cinematography (died 1943)
- 15 November – Charlotte Mew, poet (suicide 1928)
- 20 November – Herbert Tudor Buckland, seminal Arts and crafts architect (died 1951)
- 26 November – Princess Maud of Wales, queen consort of Norway (died 1938)
- 30 December – Stephen Leacock, humorist and economist (died 1944 in Canada)

== Deaths ==
- 30 January
  - Charlotte Alington Barnard, poet and composer (born 1830)
  - Frances Catherine Barnard, author (born 1796)
- 7 February – Henry Paget, 2nd Marquess of Anglesey, peer, Whig politician, courtier and cricketer (born 1797)
- 11 March – F. G. Loring, writer and naval officer (died 1951)
- 20 March – John Pascoe Grenfell, admiral in the Brazilian Navy (born 1800)
- 30 April – Sir Arthur William Buller, politician (born 1808)
- 18 May – Peter Cunningham, literary scholar and antiquarian (born 1816)
- 25 May – Sir Charles Fremantle, Royal Navy officer (born 1800)
- 10 June – Frederick Yeates Hurlstone, painter (born 1800)
- 11 July – William Jerdan, journalist (born 1782)
- 2 August – Thomas Medwin, poet, biographer and translator (born 1788)
- 5 August – Emily Eden, poet and novelist (born 1797)
- 8 August – Roger Fenton, photographer (born 1819)
- 11 September – Thomas Graham, chemist (born 1805)
- 12 September – Peter Mark Roget, lexicographer (born 1779)
- 18 September – Henry Phillpotts, Bishop of Exeter (born 1778)
- 20 September – George Patton, Lord Glenalmond, judge and politician, suicide (born 1803)
- 23 October – Edward Smith-Stanley, 14th Earl of Derby, Prime Minister (born 1799)
- 9 November – Harriet Windsor-Clive, 13th Baroness Windsor, landowner and philanthropist in Wales (born 1797)
- Full date unknown – Justina Jeffreys, Jamaican-born Welsh gentlewoman (born 1787)
