= John Barrow (Catholic priest, born 1735) =

John Barrow (1735 – 1811) was a Roman Catholic priest towards the end of the penal times for English Catholics.

== Biography ==
Barrow was from a Catholic yeoman family from Westby-in-the-Fylde. His uncle, Father Edward Barrow, was a Jesuit priest serving Wesby Hall who had been outlawed as a Catholic priest in 1717. Barrow, studied in the English College in Rome for seven years but was not ordained immediately as he was impressed into the Royal Navy in Portsmouth and served for five years before deserting at Dunkirk. He was acquitted by the court-martial through pretending to be an Italian speaker.

He resumed his studies for the priesthood at Douai where he was ordained in 1766 and became the priest at the mission in Claughton in his native Lancashire which had been associated with the recusant Brockholes family. He remained there until his death. He was buried at the adjoining mission of New House.

He enlarged the parish church of Claughton, in 1794, improved the roads as township overseer and negotiated with Sir Edward Smythe for the exchange of the land for Ushaw College. Though his name is on the list of Douai writers although no description of his writing is recorded. It is likely that he contributed to the Catholic Committee controversy. He was praised by the Cardinal Secretary of State for his Catholic loyalty and his zeal for the cause of the Holy See.
