= 1879 in the United Kingdom =

Events from the year 1879 in the United Kingdom.

== Incumbents ==
- Monarch – Victoria
- Prime Minister – Benjamin Disraeli (Conservative)

== Events ==
- 1 January – Benjamin Henry Blackwell opens the first Blackwell's bookshop in Oxford.
- 8 January – British army occupies Kandahar in Afghanistan.
- 11 January – Anglo-Zulu War begins.
- 22 January – Zulu troops led by King Cetshwayo massacre British troops at the Battle of Isandlwana. At Rorke's Drift, outnumbered British soldiers drive the attackers away after hours of fighting.
- 3 February – Mosley Street in Newcastle upon Tyne becomes the world's first public highway to be lit by the electric incandescent light bulb, invented by Joseph Swan.
- March – the standard design of pillar box reverts to a cylindrical shape (the "anonymous" style cast by Andrew Handyside and Company).
- 2 March – murder of Julia Martha Thomas at Richmond upon Thames.
- 12 March – Anglo-Zulu War: At the Battle of Intombe, a British force over one-hundred strong is ambushed and destroyed by Zulu forces.
- 13 March – marriage of The Duke of Connaught and Strathearn, third son of Queen Victoria, to Princess Louise Marguerite of Prussia.
- 28 March – Anglo-Zulu War: British forces suffer a defeat at the Battle of Hlobane.
- 29 March – Anglo-Zulu War: Battle of Kambula – British forces defeat 20,000 Zulus.
- 3 April – Anglo-Zulu War: British forces successfully lift the two-month Siege of Eshowe.
- 12 May – John Henry Newman elevated to Cardinal.
- 26 May – Russia and the United Kingdom sign the Treaty of Gandamak establishing an Afghan state.
- June–August – the wettest summer in England and Wales since records began in 1766, and the equal seventh-coolest since the CET series begins in 1659.
- 6 June – William Denny and Brothers launch the world's first ocean-going ship to be built of mild steel, the SS Rotomahana, at Dumbarton.
- 14 June – Sidney Faithorn Green, an Anglican priest in the Church of England, is tried and convicted for using Ritualist practices.
- 4 July – the Anglo-Zulu War effectively ends with British victory at the Battle of Ulundi.
- 16 August – Fulham F.C. founded in London as the Fulham St Andrew's Church Sunday School football club.
- 19 August – the foundation stone of the fourth Eddystone Lighthouse is laid by The Prince of Wales and The Duke of Edinburgh.
- September – Doncaster Rovers F.C. formed by railway fitter Albert Jenkins.
- 18 September – Blackpool Illuminations lit for the first time.
- 2 October – William Denny and Brothers launch the world's first transatlantic steamer to be built of mild steel, the SS Buenos Ayrean, at Dumbarton for Liverpool owners. On 1 December she makes her maiden voyage out of Glasgow for South America.
- 13 October – first female students admitted to study for degrees at the University of Oxford, at the new Lady Margaret Hall and Somerville Hall and with the Society of Oxford Home-Students.
- 17 October – Sunderland A.F.C. is formed as 'Sunderland and District Teachers A.F.C.' in the North East.
- 27 October – Liverpool Echo newspaper first published.
- November–March 1880 – probably the longest ever fog in the city's history engulfs London.
- December – the world's first Christmas grotto opens in Lewis's Liverpool department store as 'Christmas Fairyland'.
- 15–23 December – Second Anglo-Afghan War: British victory at the Siege of the Sherpur Cantonment.
- 28 December – the Tay Bridge Disaster: The central part of the Tay Rail Bridge in Dundee, Scotland collapses in a storm as a train passes over it, killing 78.
- 30 December – the comic opera The Pirates of Penzance is first presented in Paignton, Devon in a token performance for U.K. copyright reasons; the world première is given the following day in New York City, the only Gilbert and Sullivan work to have its official debut outside England.
- 1 January to 31 December – the combination of the severest winter since 1814, a late spring, an exceptionally cool summer and a cold dry autumn produces the third-coldest year in the CET series and the coldest since 1740, with an annual mean of 7.44 °C or 45.39 °F.

=== Undated ===
- Gabardine is invented by Thomas Burberry, founder of the Burberry fashion house in Basingstoke.
- School meals provided for destitute and poorly nourished children in Manchester.

== Publications ==
- Kate Greenaway's first book, with her own colour illustrations, Under the Window: Pictures & Rhymes for Children.
- Silas Hocking's novel Her Benny.
- George Meredith's novel The Egoist.
- Anthony Trollope's last Palliser novel The Duke's Children (serialised in All the Year Round).
- The Boy's Own Paper first published (19 January).

== Births ==
- 1 January
  - E. M. Forster, novelist (died 1970)
  - Ernest Jones, psychoanalyst (died 1958)
- 8 January – Charles Bryant, actor and director (died 1948)
- 10 January – Bobby Walker, Scottish footballer (died 1930)
- 13 January – William Reid Dick, sculptor (died 1961)
- 28 January – Una Duval, née Dugdale, suffragette (died 1975)
- 26 February – Frank Bridge, composer (died 1941)
- 5 March – William Beveridge, economist and social reformer (died 1963)
- 20 April – Robert Wilson Lynd, essayist and writer (died 1949)
- 26 April – Owen Willans Richardson, physicist, Nobel Prize laureate (died 1959)
- 29 April – Thomas Beecham, conductor (died 1961)
- 19 May – Viscount Waldorf Astor, businessman and politician (died 1952)
- 25 May – Max Aitken, 1st Baron Beaverbrook, Canadian-British business tycoon, politician and writer (died 1964)
- 30 May –
  - Colin Blythe, bowler (cricket) (killed on active service 1917)
  - Vanessa Bell, painter (died 1961)
- 4 June – Mabel Lucie Attwell, illustrator (died 1964)
- 6 June – Patrick Abercrombie, town planner (died 1957)
- 13 July – Alan Wace, archaeologist (died 1957)
- 15 July – Joseph Campbell, poet and lyricist (died 1944)
- 1 August – William Percival Crozier, editor of The Manchester Guardian (died 1944)
- 7 August – James Peters, black rugby union international (died 1954)
- 13 August – John Ireland, composer (died 1962)
- 13 September – Annie Kenney, suffragette (died 1953)
- 27 September – Cyril Scott, composer and writer (died 1970)
- 10 December – E. H. Shepard, artist and book illustrator (died 1976)
- 23 December – Louise Hampton, English actress (died 1954)
- 27 December – Sydney Greenstreet, actor (died 1954)

== Deaths ==
- 22 January – John Vivian, Liberal MP, member of the Vivian family, 60
- 18 February – Rayner Stephens, radical reformer and Methodist minister (born 1805)
- 25 February – Charles Peace, criminal (executed) (born 1832)
- 3 March
  - William Kingdon Clifford, geometer and philosopher (born 1845)
  - William Howitt, historical writer and poet (born 1792)
  - Annie Keary, novelist, poet and children's writer (born 1825)
- 22 March – Sir John Woodford, general and archaeologist (born 1785)
- 23 March – Sir Walter Trevelyan, naturalist and geologist (born 1797)
- 8 April – Sir Anthony Panizzi, librarian (born 1797 in Italy)
- 21 April – George Hadfield, radical politician (born 1787)
- 25 April – Charles Tennyson Turner, poet (born 1808)
- 4 May – William Froude, hydrodynamicist (born 1810)
- 8 May – Henry Collen, royal miniature portrait painter (born 1797)
- 10 May – Robert Thompson Crawshay, ironmaster (born 1817)
- 3 June – Frances Ridley Havergal, religious poet (born 1836)
- 7 June – William Tilbury Fox, dermatologist (born 1836)
- 3 August – Joseph Severn, painter (born 1793)
- 10 August – George Long, classical scholar (born 1800)
- 20 August – Sir John Shaw-Lebevre, barrister, Whig politician and civil servant (born 1797)
- 19 September – Clara Rousby, actress (born 1848)
- 23 September – Francis Kilvert, diarist (peritonitis) (born 1840)
- 26 September – Sir William Rowan, field marshal (born 1789)
- 5 November – James Clerk Maxwell, physicist (born 1831)
- 6 December – John Bentinck, 5th Duke of Portland (born 1800)
- 11 December – William Thomas (Gwilym Marles), minister and poet (born 1834)
- 13 December – William Calcraft, hangman (born 1800)
