= 1826 in the United Kingdom =

Events from the year 1826 in the United Kingdom.

== Incumbents ==
- Monarch – George IV
- Prime Minister – Robert Jenkinson, 2nd Earl of Liverpool (Tory)
- Foreign Secretary – George Canning
- Home Secretary – Robert Peel
- Secretary of War – Lord Bathurst

== Events ==
- 30 January – The Menai Suspension Bridge, built by engineer Thomas Telford, is opened between the island of Anglesey and the mainland of Wales.
- 11 February – University College London is founded, under the name University of London.
- 15 February – Longstone Lighthouse first illuminated as Outer Farne Lighthouse (Joseph Nelson, engineer).
- 24 February – Treaty of Yandabo cedes Arakan peninsula to Britain, ending the First Anglo-Burmese War.
- 1 March – Male Indian elephant Chunee, which was brought to London in 1811, is killed at a menagerie on The Strand after running amok the week before, killing one of his keepers. After arsenic and shooting fail, the animal is stabbed to death.
- April – A number of leading scientists form the Zoological Society of London.
- 24–26 April – Power-loom riots in the Lancashire textile districts: hand-loom weavers protest at the introduction of the power loom in Accrington, Blackburn and finally, Chatterton, where troops fire on the mob, causing the deaths of at least six.
- 5 May – The Liverpool and Manchester Railway, designed by George Stephenson and Joseph Locke, which in 1830 is to become the world's first purpose-built passenger railway operated by steam locomotives to be opened, is authorised by Parliament.
- 26 May – Country Bankers Act 1826 permits joint-stock banks outside the London area, which may issue banknotes.
- 1 June–31 August – A three-month heat wave and drought grips the country. With a mean temperature of 17.60 °C (63.68 °F), it is the hottest summer on CET records since 1659, until 1976, 2025 and 2026 meaning that it is the fourth hottest summer in the CET records.
- 19 June – Tories under Robert Jenkinson, 2nd Earl of Liverpool win a substantial increased majority over the Whigs in the general election.
- 20 June – Burney Treaty increases British control over south-east Asia.
- 1 July – The Conway Suspension Bridge, built by engineer Thomas Telford, is opened in North Wales, completing his improvements to the Holyhead road.
- 10 August – The first Cowes Regatta is held on the Isle of Wight.
- 18 August – Scottish explorer Alexander Gordon Laing becomes the first European to reach Timbuktu, but is murdered there on 26 September.
- 1 October – The Monkland and Kirkintilloch Railway opens in Scotland.
- 18 October – The last English state lottery is drawn in a series run since 1769, the next National Lottery will be in 1994.

=== Ongoing ===
- Anglo-Ashanti war (1823–1831)

=== Undated ===
- Straits Settlements established as part of the territories controlled by the British East India Company.
- Construction of the National Monument, Edinburgh on Calton Hill (to the dead of the Napoleonic Wars) is commenced; it will never be completed.

== Publications ==
- Benjamin Disraeli's (anonymous) first novel Vivian Grey.
- Walter Scott's (anonymous) historical novel Woodstock.
- Felicia Dorothea Hemans' poem "Casabianca", in The New Monthly Magazine (August).
- Christian Isobel Johnstone (as Margaret Dods)'s The Cook and Housewife's Manual.
- John C. Loudon's periodical The Gardener's Magazine first issued.

== Births ==
- 24 January – Gifford Palgrave, priest, traveller and Arabist (died 1888)
- 3 February – Walter Bagehot, economist and journalist (died 1877)
- 15 February – George Johnstone Stoney, Irish-born physicist (died 1911)
- 20 April – Dinah Craik, née Mulock, novelist and poet (died 1887)
- 15 or 25 May – Tom Sayers, bare-knuckle boxer (died 1865)
- 26 May – Richard Carrington, astronomer (died 1875)
- 18 June – William Maclagan, Archbishop of York (died 1910)
- 24 June – George Goyder, surveyor-general of South Australia (died 1898)
- 7 July – John Fowler, agricultural engineer (died 1864)
- 20 July – Laura Keene, actress (died 1873)
- 25 August – William Synge, diplomat and author (died 1891)
- 5 September – John Wisden, cricketer, creator of Wisden Cricketers' Almanack (died 1884)
- 8 September – Sir James Corry, 1st Baronet, politician (died 1891)
- 24 September – George Price Boyce, Pre-Raphaelite watercolour landscape painter (died 1897)
- 23 December – William Blanchard Jerrold, journalist and biographer (died 1884)

== Deaths ==
- 6 January – John Farey Sr., polymath (born 1766)
- 17 February – John Manners-Sutton, politician (born 1752)
- 7 March – Ann Freeman, Bible preacher (born 1797)
- 10 March – John Pinkerton, antiquarian (born 1758)
- 3 April – Reginald Heber, bishop, poet and travel writer (born 1783)
- 19 April – John Milner, Roman Catholic bishop and religious controversialist (born 1752)
- 23 June – John Taylor, Unitarian hymn writer (born 1750)
- 5 July – Sir Stamford Raffles, colonial governor, founder of Singapore (born 1781)
- 2 August – George Finch, 9th Earl of Winchilsea, cricketer (born 1752)
- 26 August – Lady Sarah Lennox, courtier (born 1745)
- 4 September – Robert Gifford, 1st Baron Gifford, lawyer, judge and politician (born 1779)
- 26 September – Alexander Gordon Laing, Scottish explorer (born 1794)
- 26 November – John Nichols, printer and author (born 1745)
- 7 December – John Flaxman, sculptor (born 1755)
- 31 December – William Gifford, satirist (born 1756)
