= 1731 in Great Britain =

Events from the year 1731 in Great Britain.

== Incumbents ==
- Monarch – George II
- Prime Minister – Robert Walpole (Whig)

== Events ==
- 16 March – Treaty of Vienna signed between the Holy Roman Empire, Great Britain, the Dutch Republic and Spain.
- April – trader Robert Jenkins has his ear cut off by Spanish coast guards in Cuba, casus belli for the War of Jenkins' Ear in 1739.
- 28 April – a fire at White's Chocolate House, near St. James's Palace in London, destroys the historic club and the paintings therein, but is kept from spreading by the fast response of firemen.
- 4 June – great fire destroys much of the centre of Blandford Forum, Dorset.
- 5 June – Tiverton fire of 1731, a great fire in Tiverton, Devon.
- 23 August – the oldest known sports score in history is recorded in the description of a cricket match at Richmond Green, when the team of Thomas Chambers of Middlesex defeats the Duke of Richmond's team by 119 to 79.
- September – the first successful appendectomy is performed by surgeon William Cookesley.
- 30 September – the village of Barnwell, Cambridgeshire, is "burned down entirely" by a fire.
- 23 October – fire at Ashburnham House in London damages the nationally owned Cotton library, housed there at this time.

=== Undated ===
- Proceedings in Courts of Justice Act 1730: Legal proceedings in the courts to be conducted in the English language.
- William Hogarth produces his A Harlot's Progress series of paintings.
- John Bevis observes the Crab Nebula for the first time in the modern era.

== Publications ==
- 1 January – first edition of The Gentleman's Magazine published by Edward Cave.
- Jethro Tull's treatise The New Horse-Houghing Husbandry; or, an essay on the principles of tillage and vegetation.

== Births ==
- 4 February – Mary Deverell, religious writer, essayist and poet (died 1805)
- 10 February – Thomas Beckwith, English painter, genealogist and antiquary (died 1786)
- 8 May – Beilby Porteus, Bishop of London and abolitionist (died 1809)
- August – Henry Constantine Jennings, collector of antiquities and gambler (died 1819)
- 10 October – Henry Cavendish, scientist (died 1810)
- 15 November – William Cowper, poet (died 1800)
- 12 December – Erasmus Darwin, physician and scientist, grandfather of Charles Darwin (died 1802)
- date unknown – William Aiton, Scottish botanist (died 1793)

== Deaths ==
- 10 February – George Carpenter, 1st Baron Carpenter, Army general (born 1657)
- 24 April – Daniel Defoe, writer (born 1660)
- 11 May – Mary Astell, feminist writer (born 1666)
- 17 May – Samuel Bradford, churchman and Whig politician (born 1652)
- 20 June – Ned Ward, writer and publican (born 1667)
- 18 July – Sir Walter Yonge, 3rd Baronet, politician (born 1653)
- 24 August – William Godolphin, Marquess of Blandford, nobleman (born c. 1699)
- 17 December – George Lockhart, Scottish writer, spy and politician, killed in duel (born 1673)
- 29 December – Brook Taylor, mathematician (born 1685)

== See also ==
- 1731 in Wales
