= 1837 in the United Kingdom =

Events from the year 1837 in the United Kingdom. This marks the beginning of the Victorian era.

== Incumbents ==
- Monarch – William IV (until 20 June), Victoria (starting 20 June)
- Prime Minister – William Lamb, 2nd Viscount Melbourne (Whig)
- Foreign Secretary – Henry John Temple, 3rd Viscount Palmerston
- Home Secretary – Lord John Russell

== Events ==
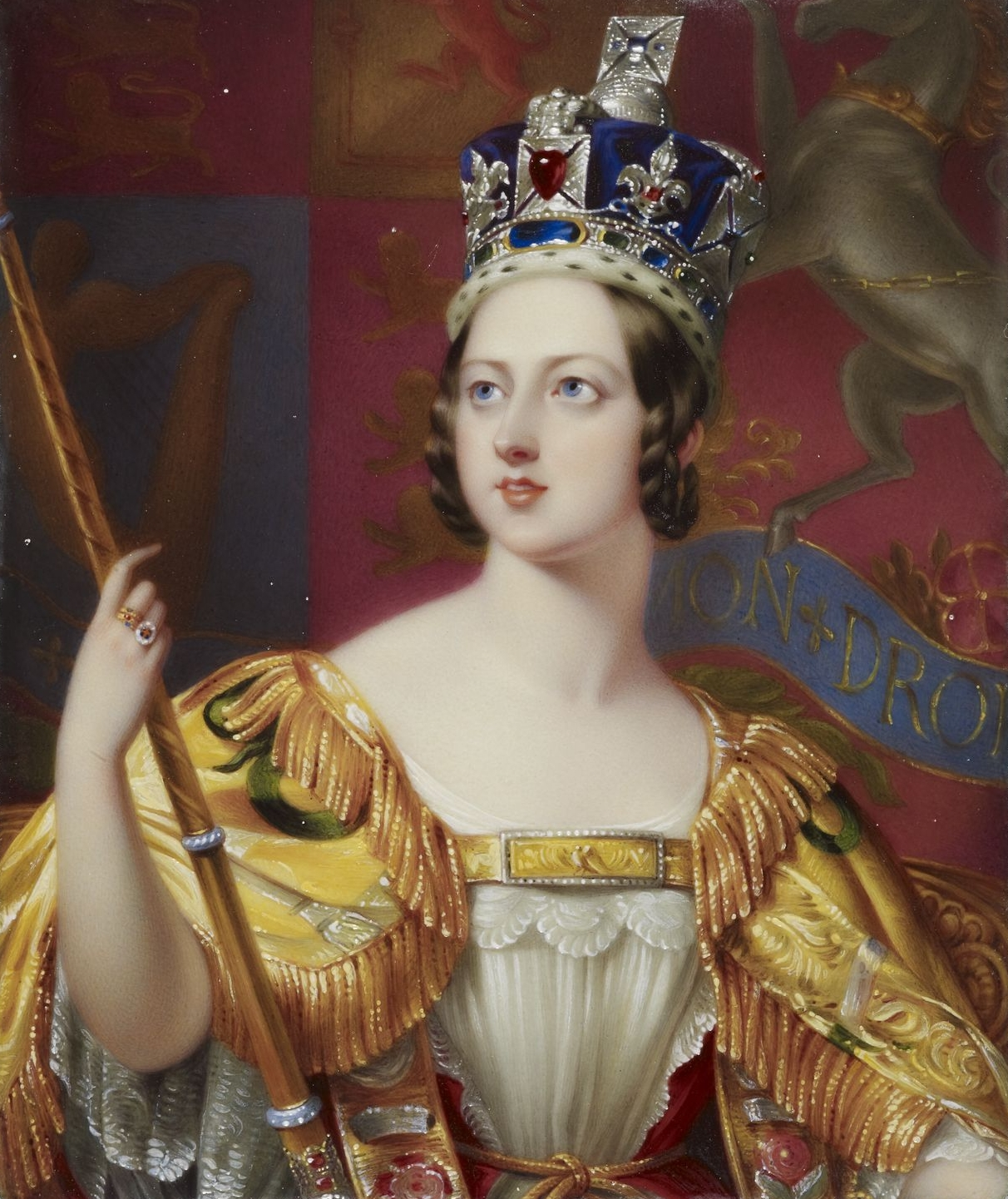
Victoria, Queen of the United Kingdom of Great Britain and Ireland (1837–1901)

- January–February – Serious influenza outbreak.
- 11 January – The Royal Institute of British Architects in London (RIBA) is granted its royal charter.
- 13 February – Rowland Hill's government inquiry into postal reform discusses the idea of carrying letters in a separate sheet which folds to become an envelope and the idea of "a bit of paper" which could be affixed to a letter to flag that postage had been prepaid.
- March – A new city in the Australian colonies is named for Lord Melbourne, the Prime Minister.
- 1 March–31 May – At only 5.63 °C (42.13 °F) Central England temperature, the coolest English spring on record; this remains the last recorded coolest traditional season in the CET series.
- c. June – Smallpox epidemic of 1837–40 breaks out.
- 1 June – The Government-funded Normal School of Design, predecessor of the Royal College of Art, begins classes at Somerset House in London.
- 3 June – The Kensington Hippodrome opens in Notting Hill.
- 12 June – Cooke and Wheatstone file their patent for the electrical telegraph.
- 20 June – King William IV dies from heart failure early that morning at Windsor Castle with Queen Adelaide at his bedside. Due to none of his nine surviving children being legitimate, his 18-year-old niece, Princess Victoria of Kent, ascends the throne as Queen Victoria. At 6am, Francis Conyngham, 2nd Marquess Conyngham (Lord Chamberlain) and William Howley (Archbishop of Canterbury) call on her at Kensington Palace to break the news. She will reign for 63 years. Under Salic law, the Kingdom of Hanover passes to William's brother, Ernest Augustus, Duke of Cumberland, ending the personal union of Britain and Hanover which has persisted since 1714.
- 30 June – The use of the pillory as a punishment is abolished by act of parliament.
- 1 July – General Register Office begins the practice of registering births, marriages and deaths in England and Wales.
- 3 July – Wills Act clarifies the procedure for making a valid will with effect from 1 January 1838.
- 13 July – Queen Victoria moves from Kensington Palace into Buckingham Palace, the first reigning British monarch to make this, rather than St James's Palace, their London home.
- 19 July
  - The Isambard Kingdom Brunel-designed steamship SS Great Western is launched in Bristol.
  - The first missionaries sent abroad by the Church of Jesus Christ of Latter-day Saints land from the United States at Liverpool. On 30 July, apostle Heber C. Kimball baptises the first English converts (George D. Watt and 8 others) in the River Ribble near Preston, Lancashire.
- 20 July – Euston Station, London's first mainline railway terminus, is opened.
- 24 July–18 August – A General election results in a Whig victory for the fourth consecutive time.
- 17 August – John Kent becomes Britain's first black police officer on joining the constabulary in Carlisle.
- 28 August – Lea & Perrins begin making Worcestershire sauce.
- October – Alleged first sighting of a Spring-heeled Jack, in London.
- 1 October – The Punishment of Offences Act and other acts coming into force on this day remove capital punishment as a penalty for crimes including burglary, arson, forgery and "shooting at".
- 9 November – Stockbroker Moses Montefiore becomes the first Jew to receive a knighthood.
- 15 November – Isaac Pitman publishes Pitman Shorthand.
- Undated – Joseph Paxton designs the Great Conservatory or Stove at Chatsworth House; it is the world's largest glass building at this time.

== Publications ==
- Richard Harris Barham's The Ingoldsby Legends 'by Thomas Ingoldsby' begin to appear in serial form in Bentley's Miscellany.
- Thomas Carlyle's book The French Revolution: A History.
- Charles Dickens' novel Oliver Twist appears in serial form in Bentley's Miscellany (from February).
- Robert Southey's "The Story of the Three Bears" appears in The Doctor.
- Martin Tupper's book Proverbial Philosophy.
- Andrew Ure's encyclopedia A Dictionary of Arts, Manufactures and Mines.

== Births ==
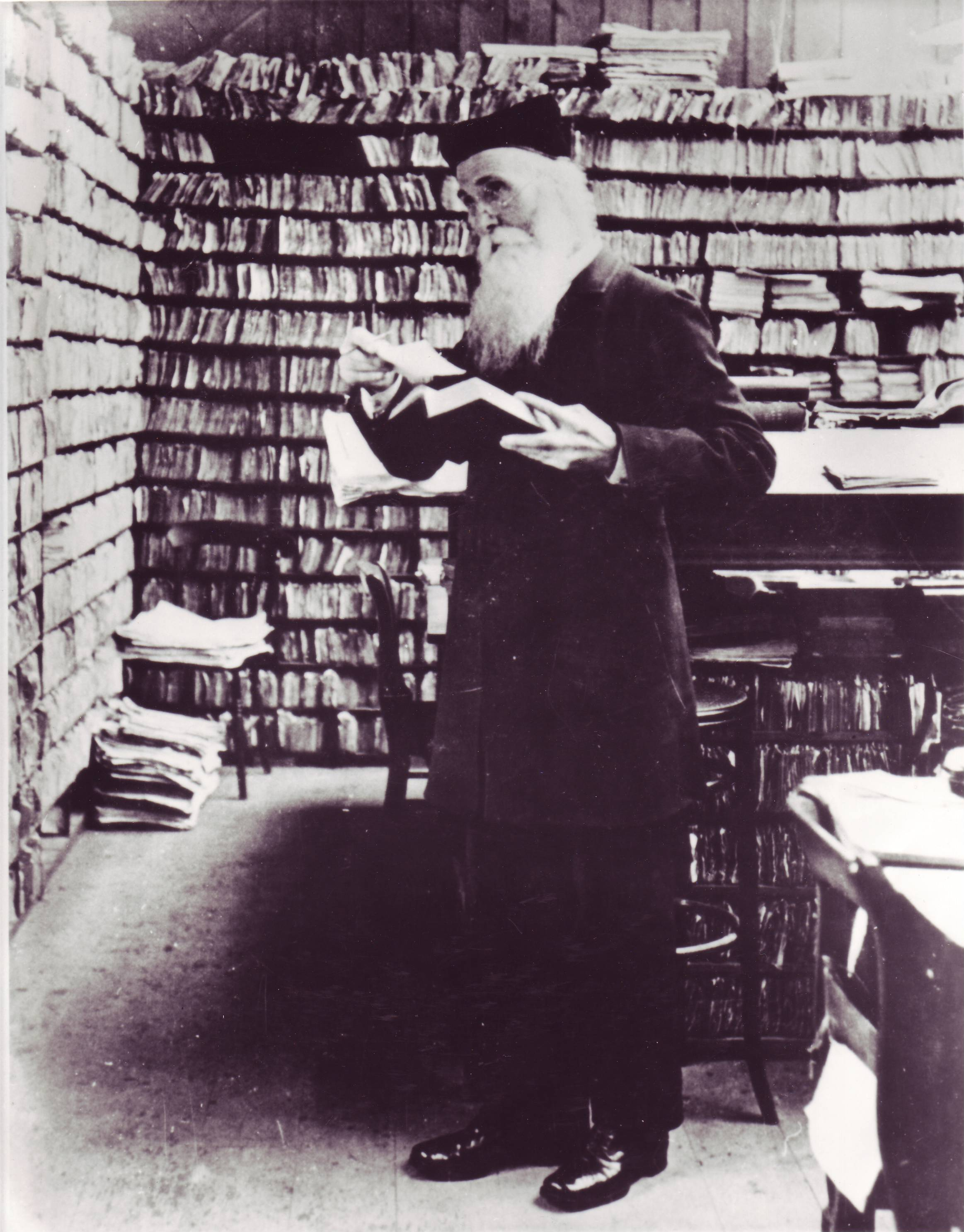
James Murray

- 7 January – Thomas Henry Ismay, shipowner (died 1899)
- 30 January – Augusta Webster, born Julia Augusta Davies, poet (died 1894)
- 7 February – James Murray, lexicographer (died 1915)
- 23 March – Charles Wyndham, actor and theatrical manager (died 1919)
- 5 April – Algernon Charles Swinburne, poet (died 1909)
- 7 April – Gilbert Arthur à Beckett, writer (died 1891)
- 28 May – George Ashlin, architect (died 1921)
- 9 June – Anne Isabella Thackeray Ritchie, novelist and essayist (died 1919)
- 14 November – Lucas Barrett, naturalist (died 1862)
- 23 November – Joseph Leycester Lyne, Anglican Benedictine abbot (died 1908)
- 5 December – Richard Thomas, tin plate manufacturer (died 1916)
- 26 December – William Boyd Dawkins, geologist (died 1929)

== Deaths ==
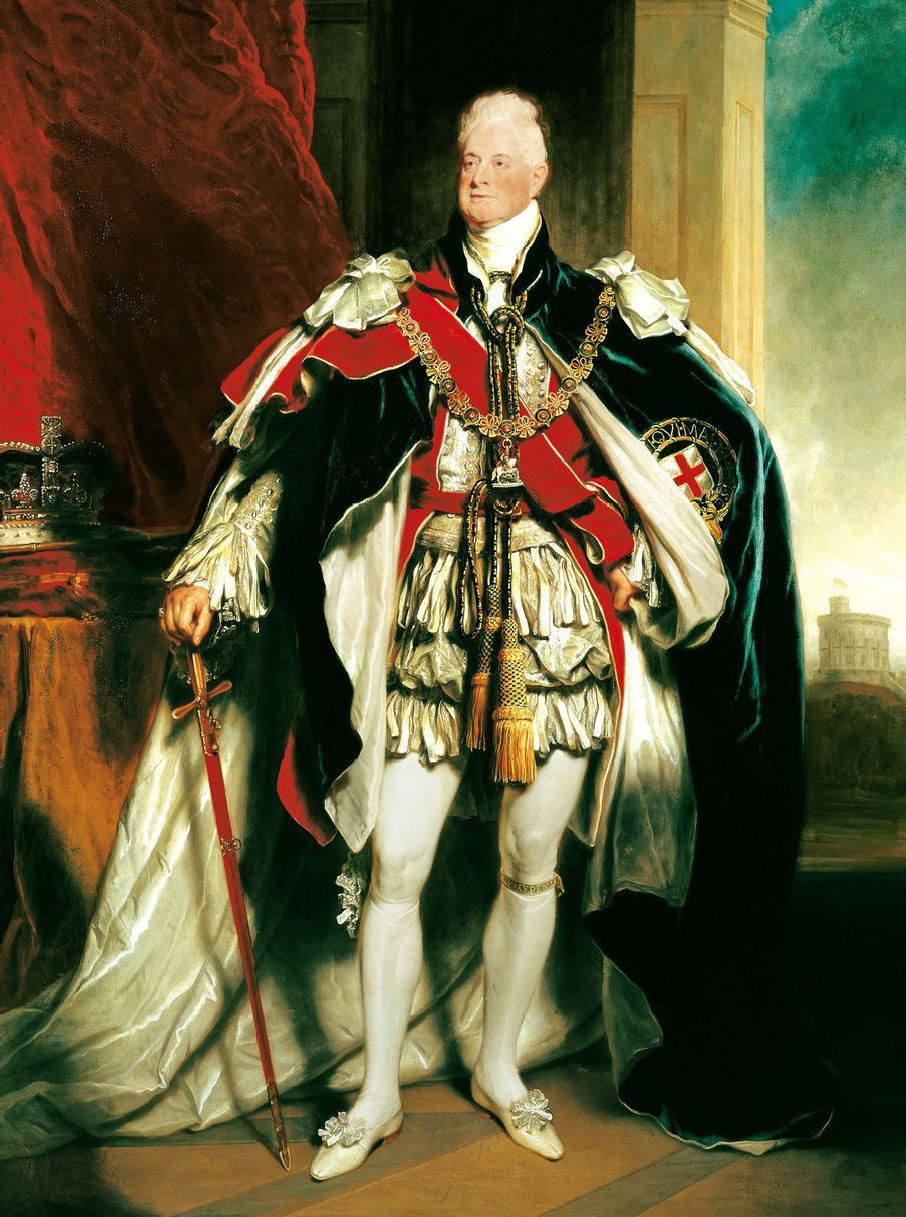
William IV of the United Kingdom

- 20 January – Sir John Soane, British architect (born 1753)
- 23 January – John Field, Irish composer (born 1782)
- 31 January – John Rolls of The Hendre, judge (born 1776)
- 1 February – Edward Donovan, writer, traveller and amateur zoologist (born 1768)
- 19 February – Thomas Burgess author, philosopher and Bishop (born 1756)
- 31 March – John Constable, painter (born 1776)
- 31 May – Joseph Grimaldi, clown (born 1778)
- 20 June – William IV (born 1765)
- 24 June – Henry Thynne, 3rd Marquess of Bath, naval officer and politician (born 1797)
- 1 August – Walter Geikie, painter (born 1795)
- 22 September – William George Horner, mathematician (born 1786)
- 7 December – Robert Nicoll, poet (born 1814)
