= 1828 in the United Kingdom =

Events from the year 1828 in the United Kingdom.

== Incumbents ==
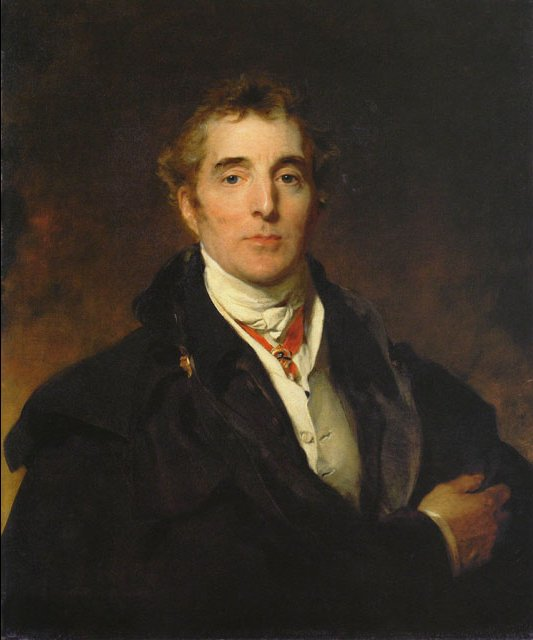
The Duke of Wellington became Prime Minister for the first time.

- Monarch – George IV
- Prime Minister – F. J. Robinson, 1st Viscount Goderich (Coalition) (until 21 January); Arthur Wellesley, 1st Duke of Wellington (Tory) (starting 22 January)
- Foreign Secretary – John Ward, 1st Earl of Dudley (until 2 June) George Hamilton-Gordon, 4th Earl of Aberdeen (starting 2 June)
- Home Secretary – Marquess of Lansdowne (until 22 January) Robert Peel (starting 26 January)
- Secretary of War – William Huskisson (until 30 May) George Murray (from 30 May)

== Events ==
- 22 January – The Duke of Wellington succeeds Lord Goderich as Prime Minister with a reforming Tory government.
- 17 April – Royal Free Hospital, established as the London General Institution for the Gratuitous Care of Malignant Diseases by surgeon William Marsden, opens.
- 27 April – London Zoo opens in Regent's Park for members of the Zoological Society of London, the first scientific zoo in the U.K., and the Tower of London menagerie is transferred there.
- 9 May – Sacramental Test Act removes most prohibitions on nonconformists and Catholics holding public office.
- 21 June – King's College London founded as a secular institution.
- 1 July – Offences against the Person Act 1828 ("Lord Lansdowne's Act") comes into force in England and Wales as one of "Peel's Acts", consolidating and simplifying the law related to cases of violent offence against the person, repealing clause XXXVI of Magna Carta and abolishing the crime of petty treason.
- 8 August – William Howley elected as Archbishop of Canterbury (enthroned by proxy 28 August) in succession to Charles Manners-Sutton.
- 11 August – William Corder is hanged at Bury St. Edmunds for the murder of Maria Marten at the Red Barn a year ago.
- 1 October – James Beaumont Neilson patents the hot blast process for ironmaking.
- 25 October – St Katharine Docks opened in London.
- 17 December – Trial of the case of the murderers and body snatchers William Burke and William Hare begins in Edinburgh.
- December – Mary Anning discovers Britain's first pterosaur fossil at Lyme Regis on the south coast.

=== Ongoing ===
- Anglo-Ashanti war (1823–1831)

=== Undated ===
- Henri Ollivier becomes the first Onion Johnny in England.
- The Gentleman's Relish (or Patum Peperium), a type of anchovy paste, is created by John Osborn.

== Publications ==
- 5 July – The Spectator is founded by Robert Rintoul as a radical weekly magazine.
- Edward Bulwer-Lytton's "silver fork novel" Pelham.
- John Payne Collier produces a script of Punch and Judy.
- Sir Walter Scott's novel The Fair Maid of Perth (or St. Valentine's Day; Chronicles of the Canongate, 2nd series).

== Births ==
- 12 February – George Meredith, novelist and poet (died 1909)
- 18 March – Randal Cremer, politician and pacifist, recipient of the Nobel Peace Prize (died 1908)
- 4 April – Mrs. Oliphant, born Margaret Wilson, Scottish-born novelist and historical writer (died 1897)
- 20 April – Josephine Butler, social reformer (died 1906)
- 12 May – Dante Gabriel Rossetti, Pre-Raphaelite painter and poet (died 1882)
- 20 June – John Wharlton Bunney, Pre-Raphaelite topographical and landscape painter (died 1882)
- 23 July – Jonathan Hutchinson, surgeon (died 1913)
- 1 September – Anthony Hoskins, admiral (died 1901)
- 31 October – Joseph Swan, physicist and chemist (died 1914)
- 10 December – Jane Senior, née Hughes, social reformer (died 1877)
- William Robert Woodman, co-founder of the Hermetic Order of the Golden Dawn (died 1891)

== Deaths ==
- 26 January – Lady Caroline Lamb, novelist (born 1785)
- 3 February – Sir Richard Strachan, 6th Baronet, admiral (born 1760)
- 7 February – Henry Neele, poet and scholar (born 1798)
- 28 March – Frances Burney, dramatist (born 1776)
- 16 May – William Congreve, inventor, rocket pioneer (born 1772)
- 28 May – Anne Seymour Damer, sculptor, author and actress (born 1748)
- 11 June – Dugald Stewart, Scottish Enlightenment philosopher (born 1753)
- 21 July – Charles Manners-Sutton, Archbishop of Canterbury from 1805 (born 1755)
- 18 September – Samuel Oldknow, cotton manufacturer born 1756)
- 28 September – Richard Parkes Bonington, landscape painter (born 1802, tuberculosis)
- 8 November – Thomas Bewick, wood-engraver and writer on natural history (born 1753)
- 4 December – Robert Jenkinson, 2nd Earl of Liverpool, statesman, Prime Minister 1812–1827 (born 1770)
- 22 December – William Hyde Wollaston, chemist (born 1766)
- William Billingsley, porcelain painter (born 1758)
