= John James Stuart of Allanbank =

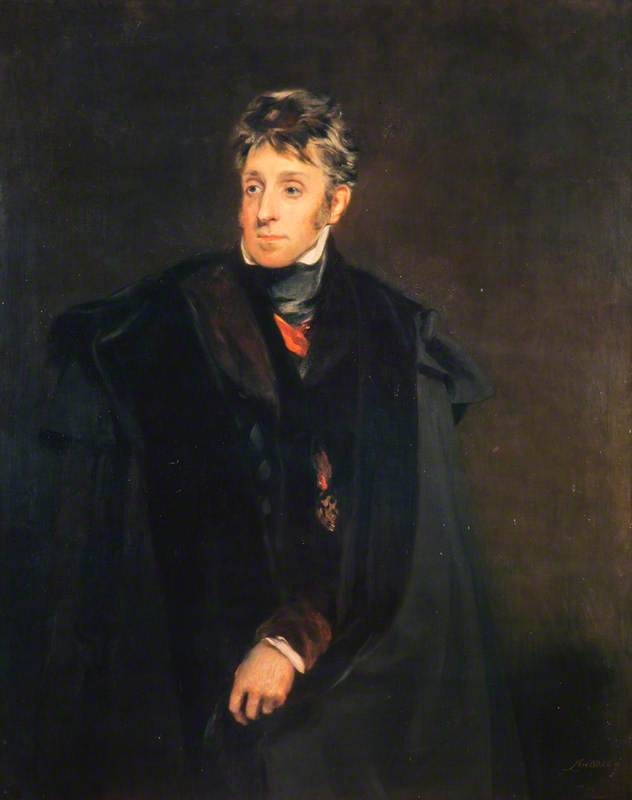
Portrait by Andrew Geddes

Sir John James Stuart or Steuart, 5th Baronet of Allanbank, FRSE (1779–1849) was a 19th-century Scottish landowner and artist.

== Life ==
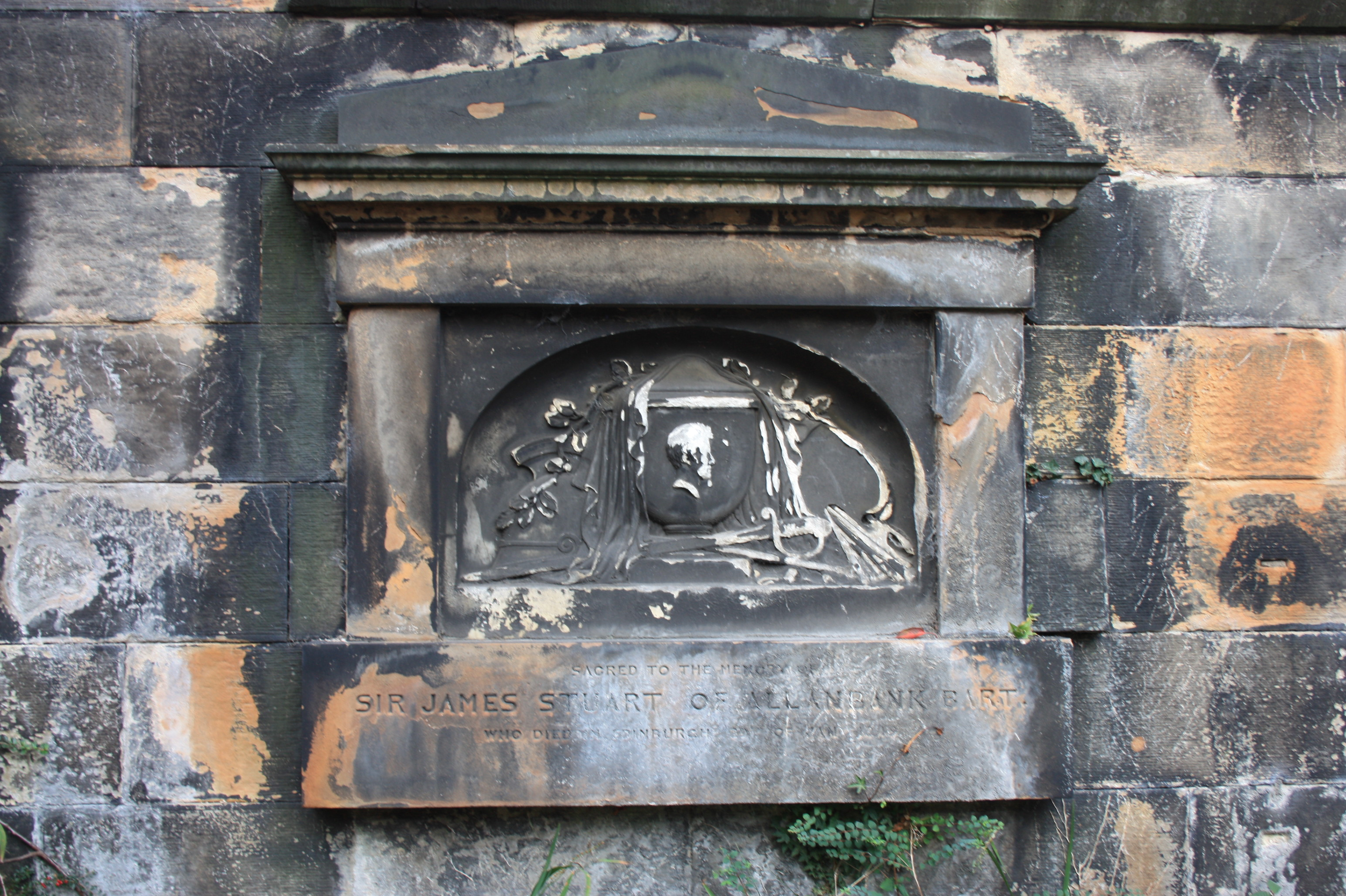
The grave of Sir John James Stuart of Allanbank, St Johns, Edinburgh

He was born in Rome in 1779 the eldest son of Sir John Steuart, 4th Baronet of Allanbank, great-grandson of Sir Robert Steuart, 1st Baronet, and his wife, Frances Coutts.

In 1817, on the death of his father, he inherited his estates and became 5th Baronet of Allanbank.

In 1823 he was elected a Fellow of the Royal Society of Edinburgh his proposer being fellow amateur artist James Skene of Rubislaw.

He died at his Edinburgh townhouse, 20 Maitland Street on 29 January 1849. He is buried nearby, against the north wall in the centre of one of the lower terraces of the churchyard of St John's, Edinburgh.

== Family ==
He married twice. Firstly to Catherine Monro, daughter of Alexander Monro, tertius.

He secondly married Elizabeth Catherine Woodcock (d.1828), daughter of Elborough Woodcock.

He had no children by either marriage and the baronetcy ended with his death.

== Known works ==
- Entrance to Scarborough Castle
- A Coastal View with Shipping
- Huntmen at Arundel
- A Cavalry Skirmish

== Artistic recognition ==
His portrait by Andrew Geddes is held by the Scottish National Portrait Gallery.

Baronetage of Nova Scotia
Preceded by John Steuart	Baronet (of Allanbank); 1817–1849	Dormant
