= Sir James Stewart, 1st Baronet =

Scottish lawyer and politician (1681–1727)

The Much Honoured Sir James Stewart, Bt
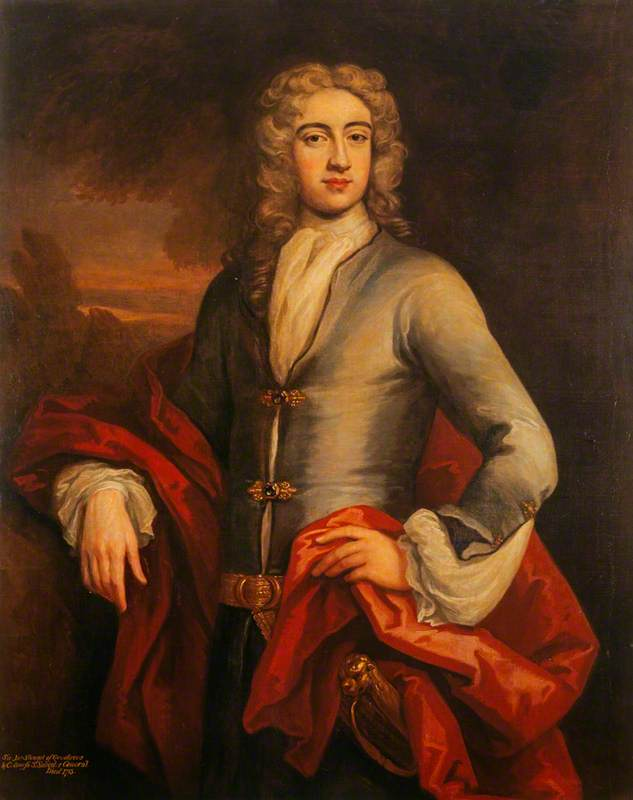
- Portrait attributed to William Aikman

Member of Parliament for Edinburgh
- In office 1713–1715
- Preceded by: Sir Patrick Johnston
- Succeeded by: Sir George Warrender

Personal details
- Born: 1681
- Died: 9 August 1727 (aged 46) Great Britain
- Party: Whig
- Spouse: Anne Dalrymple
- Relations: Sir James Stewart (grandfather); William Mure (nephew); Sir James Steuart Denham (grandson)
- Children: 12, including James
- Parent(s): Sir James Stewart; Agnes Traill

Sir James Stewart, 1st Baronet (or Steuart; 1681 – 9 August 1727) was a Scottish lawyer and politician.

== Early life ==
He was the first son of Sir James Stewart of Goodtrees (1635–1713) by his first wife Agnes, daughter of the Rev. Robert Traill, and grandson of Sir James Stewart of Coltness (1608–1681), Lord Provost of Edinburgh. His father, a distinguished lawyer and an active Whig, was appointed Lord Advocate by William II and III in 1692. His sister, Anne Stewart, married William Mure of Caldwell, father of William Mure (1718–1776).

== Career ==
Stewart followed his father into the law and became an advocate in 1704. In May 1705, he was elected to the Parliament of Scotland for Queensferry and was created a Baronet, of Goodtrees, on 22 December.

=== First Parliament of Great Britain ===
The failure of the Stewarts to support the Act of Union 1707 meant that the younger Stewart was not chosen to represent Scotland in the first Parliament of Great Britain, and did not stand at the general election in 1708. The elder Stewart was replaced as Lord Advocate by Sir David Dalrymple in 1709, but the younger Stewart succeeded Dalrymple as Solicitor General, holding the office jointly with Thomas Kennedy of Dunure. Dalrymple, uncle to Stewart's wife Anne, supported the candidacy of his nephew-by-marriage for Edinburgh in 1710 without success.

=== Involvement with Lord Advocate ===
Stewart's father was reappointed Lord Advocate in 1711, but Stewart and Kennedy did most of the work. The elder Stewart died on 1 May 1713, and Stewart succeeded to the estates of Goodtrees and Coltness. Both Stewart and Kennedy expected promotion to the now-vacant office of Lord Advocate, and Stewart was elected to Parliament for Edinburgh in the general election of that year in an attempt to increase his influence. However Lord Oxford continued to leave the post vacant, and Stewart turned against the government, attacking ministers in Parliament over the New Woodstock election petition and the expulsion of Richard Steele. He was sacked as Solicitor-General in March 1714 and Kennedy was appointed Lord Advocate.

=== Solicitor-General (1714) ===
Following the death of Queen Anne and the accession of George I, Stewart was re-appointed as sole Solicitor-General in October 1714. He was again disappointed of the office of Lord Advocate, which went to Sir David Dalrymple. He did not contest his seat in Parliament at the general election of 1715, but remained politically active in Scotland, supporting the government during the Jacobite rising of that year. He continued as Solicitor-General until 1717.

== Personal life ==
On 9 March 1705 he married Anne Dalrymple, daughter of Lord North Berwick, the Lord President of the Court of Session. Together they had 12 children, including:

- James Stewart (8 October 1707 – 1780), who married Lady Frances, granddaughter of David Wemyss, 4th Earl of Wemyss. Frances Wemyss was daughter of James, Earl of Wemyss and Janet Charteris.

Sir James Stewart of Goodtrees and Coltness died in 1727. By his wife Anne he left one son and five daughters, six other children having predeceased him. He was succeeded in his estates and the baronetcy by his eldest living son, James.

=== Descendants ===
Among his descendants was his grandson, Sir James Steuart Denham, 8th Baronet (1744–1839),

Legal offices
Preceded by William Carmichael	Solicitor General for Scotland; 1709–1714; With: Thomas Kennedy	Succeeded by John Carnegie of Boyseck
Preceded by John Carnegie of Boyseck	Solicitor General for Scotland; 1714–1717	Succeeded by Robert Dundas
Parliament of Great Britain
Preceded by Sir Patrick Johnston	Member of Parliament for Edinburgh; 1713 – 1715	Succeeded by Sir George Warrender
Baronetage of Nova Scotia
New creation	Baronet (of Goodtrees); 1705–1727	Succeeded by James Steuart
