= Steuart baronets =

Extinct baronetcy in the Baronetage of Nova Scotia

Three Steuart baronetcies were given to three brothers, the first, fourth, and seventh of the seven sons of Sir James Steuart, knight, Lord Provost of Edinburgh, who died in 1681. (In one case, reliable sources differ; see below.)

== Family ==
The following table is incomplete, including only the holders of the three Steuart baronetcies and their immediate ancestors.

- Sir James Steuart, of Coltness (1608–1681), Lord Provost
  - Sir Thomas Steuart, 1st Baronet, of Coltness (1631–1698), eldest son of the Lord Provost; baronetcy cr. 1698; married twice, to Margaret Elliot, and to Susan Lockhart, née Denham. His second wife was the younger sister of Sir William Denham, Master of the Mint, 1st Baronet of Westshield.
    - Sir David Steuart, 2nd Baronet of Coltness (1656–1723). He sold Coltness to his uncle, Sir James Steuart of Goodtrees, the Lord Advocate, in 1712.
    - Walter Stewart (1663–bef.1723)
      - Sir Thomas Steuart, de jure 3rd Baronet (1708–1737), surgeon, d. St. Kitts
    - Sir Robert Steuart, de jure 4th Baronet, (1675-bef. 1758)
      - Sir John Steuart, de jure 5th Baronet, (-1759). Professor of Natural Philosophy at Edinburgh.
    - Sir Archibald Steuart Denham of Westshield, 6th Baronet of Coltness, and Baronet of Denham of Westshield (1683–1773) (son by 2nd marriage).
  - Sir James Stewart, 1st Baronet (1681–1727), solicitor-general and son Sir James Steuart (died 1713) Lord Advocate, cr. 1695 or 1705; see also below.
    - Sir James Steuart of Goodtrees and Coltness, (1681–1727), 2nd Baronet of Goodtrees was the father of Margaret Calderwood.
      - Sir James Steuart of Coltness and Westshield, 3rd Baronet of Goodtrees, and 7th of Coltness (1713–1780), the economist and Jacobite. He succeeded to the baronetcy of Coltness in 1773; he was bequeathed the Denham estates in 1776, and took the name of Sir James Steuart Denham.
        - Sir James Steuart Denham of Coltness, (1744–1839), 4th baronet of Goodtrees and 8th baronet of Coltness, General.
    - Henry Steuart Barclay, (1697–?) m. the heiress of John Barclay.
      - William Steuart Barclay, (1736–1783) of Collernie
        - Sir Henry Steuart Barclay, (1765–1851), 5th baronet of Goodtrees and 9th baronet of Coltness.
  - Sir Robert Steuart of Allanbank (1643–1707) 1st baronet of Allanbank, 7th and youngest son of the Lord Provost; cr. 1687
    - Sir John Steuart of Allanbank (c.1685-1753) 2nd baronet
      - Sir John Steuart of Allanbank (1714–1796) 3rd baronet
        - Sir John Steuart of Allanbank (1754–1817) 4th baronet
          - Sir John James Stuart of Allanbank FRSE (1779–1849) 5th baronet, b. at Rome. A noted artist.

All three baronetcies are dormant, and probably extinct. If, however, there is a cadet branch of the family of Allanbank, they would have inherited the Allanbank title in 1849 and the other two in 1851.

== Notes ==
=== Coltness ===
These men are conventionally referred to, in the Scottish manner, by the names of their estates. The baronetcies are also distinguished by the estates of the original grantee. These do not agree because the second baronet of Coltness sold the estate of Coltness, near Edinburgh, to his uncle, the Lord Advocate.

The 3rd, 4th, and 5th Baronets of that line, since they had no estate, did not use their title.

=== Denham ===
The 6th Baronet of Coltness, the last survivor of Sir Thomas's fourteen sons, inherited the Denham baronetcy and their estate of Westshield from his mother; he took the name of Denham, becoming Sir Archibald Steuart Denham.

On his death in 1773, the baronetcy of Coltness passed to his cousin, Sir James Steuart, already Baronet of Goodtrees. The Denham baronetcy and estate passed by entail to his nephew, the last surviving Denham heir. He, however, died in 1776, and left Westshield to the same Sir James Steuart, who thereupon took the name of Sir James Steuart Denham for the last four years of his life.

=== Goodtrees ===
Sources differ when, and for whom, the baronetcy of Goodtrees was created. The Oxford Dictionary of National Biography says it was created in 1695 for the Lord Advocate; the Complete Baronetage says it was created for his son, the future Solicitor-General, on the occasion of the son's marriage in 1705. The Lord Advocate was Sir James Steuart in either case, having been knighted; the chief effect of this is to change the numbering of the Goodtrees baronets.

The 2nd or 3rd Goodtrees baronet sold the estate of Goodtrees after he returned from France in 1766.

== See also ==
- Stewart baronets
- Stuart baronets
- Denham baronets
- Steuart family
- Stewart and Shaw-Stewart of Blackhall Baronets
