= William Calderwood =

William Calderwood may refer to:

- William Calderwood, Lord Polton, Scottish lord of session
- William Leadbetter Calderwood, Scottish marine biologist
