= John Carnegie (Jacobite) =

Scottish lawyer, Jacobite and politician

John Carnegie of Boysack

Solicitor General for Scotland
- In office 1714–1716 Serving with Sir James Stewart, Bt
- Preceded by: Thomas Kennedy; Sir James Stewart
- Succeeded by: Sir James Stewart, Bt

Member of Parliament for Forfar
- In office 1708–1716
- Preceded by: New constituency
- Succeeded by: James Scott

Personal details
- Born: c. 1679/80
- Died: May 1750
- Spouse: Margaret Skene (after 1707)
- Children: John Carnegie; James Carnegie
- Parent(s): John Carnegie of Boysack; Jean Fotheringham
- Education: Marischal College; University of Leyden

John Carnegie (c. 1679/80 – by May 1750) of Boysack, Angus was a Scottish lawyer and politician who sat in the House of Commons from 1708 to 1716 when he was expelled for supporting the Jacobite rebellion.

== Early life ==
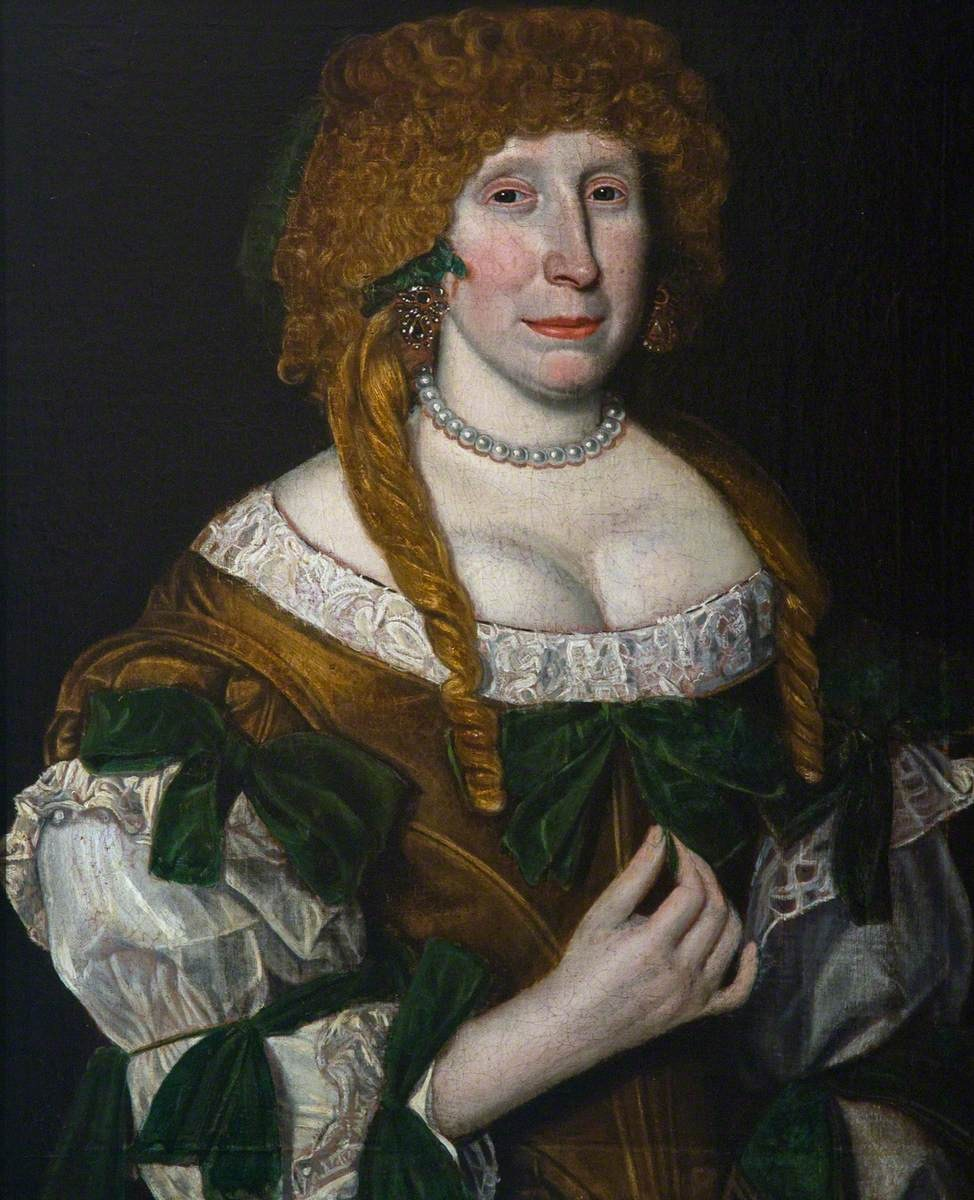
Portrait of his grandmother, Margaret Erskine, c. 1700

Carnegie was the eldest son of John Carnegie of Boysack (c. 1646–c. 1688) and his wife Jean Fotheringham, daughter of David Fotheringham of Powrie, Forfar, Shire Commissioner in the Parliament of Scotland. His paternal grandparents were Hon. John Carnegie (second son of the 1st Earl of Northesk) and Margaret Erskine (a daughter of Sir Alexander Erskine, 11th Laird of Dun).

He had succeeded to the estate of his father by 1683. He was educated at Marischal College from 1696 to 1698 and at the University of Leyden in 1700, aged 20.

== Career ==
In 1703, he was admitted as an advocate.

At the 1708 general election Carnegie was returned as the Member of Parliament (MP) for Forfar, the county's first representative to the House of Commons of Great Britain. He was returned again for Forfar at the 1710 general election and in 1713.

In 1714 he was appointed Solicitor General for Scotland but was only in post for 6 months. At the 1715 general election, he was returned as MP for Forfar. He took part in the Jacobite rising of 1715, for which he was expelled from the House of Commons in 1716.

== Personal life ==
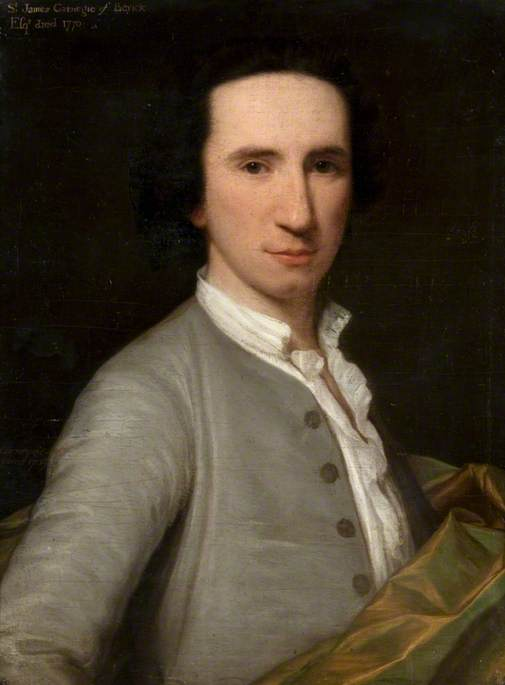
Portrait of his younger son, James, by Domenico Duprà, 1739

On 6 November 1707, he married Margaret Skene, daughter of James Skene of Grange and Kirkcaldy, Fife. After her father's death, her mother, Anna or Agnes Skene, remarried to Patrick Moncreiff, MP for Scotland and Fife. Together, they were the parents of two sons:

- John Carnegie (c. 1708–1736), who married Margaret Valentine.
- James Carnegie (c. 1714–1770), the father of Stewart Carnegie who married William Fullerton Lindsay.

Carnegie died by 14 May 1750. He had two sons, and his elder son was served as heir.

=== Descendants ===
His younger son James, entailed the Dun and Kinblethmont estates to his grandson, James Fullerton Lindsay (1764–1805), who assumed the additional surname of Carnegie upon inheriting the estate.

Parliament of Great Britain
New constituency	Member of Parliament for Forfar; 1708–1716	Succeeded by James Scott
Legal offices
Preceded by Thomas Kennedy; Sir James Stewart	Solicitor General for Scotland; 1714–1716; With: Sir James Stewart, Bt	Succeeded by Sir James Stewart, Bt
