= James Melville (Scottish minister) =

Scottish reformer (1556–1614)

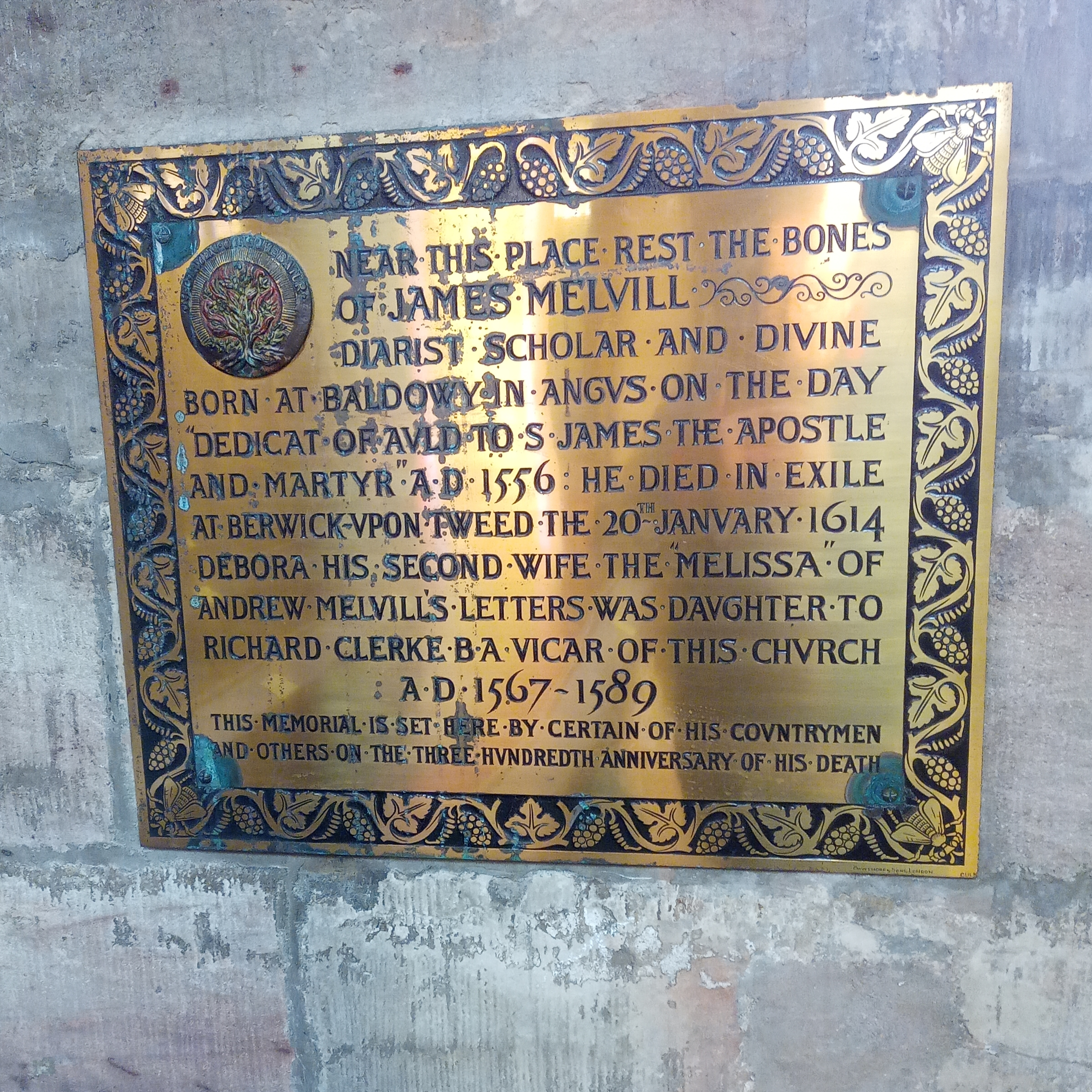
James Melville plaque in Holy Trinity Church in Berwick

James Melville (26 July 1556 – 1614) was a Scottish divine and reformer, son of the laird of Baldovie, in Forfarshire.

== Life ==
Melville was born at Baldovie in Angus in 1556 and he was educated at Montrose and St Leonard's College, St Andrews and in 1574 proceeded to the University of Glasgow. There his uncle, Andrew Melville, the reformer and scholar, was principal. Within a year James became one of the regents.

== Teaching role ==
When, in 1580, Andrew became Principal of St Mary's College, St Andrews (then called New College), James accompanied him, and acted as Professor of Hebrew and Oriental Languages. For three and a half years he lectured in the university, chiefly on Hebrew, but he had to flee to Berwick in May 1584 (a few months after his uncle's exile) to escape the attacks of his ecclesiastical enemy, Bishop Patrick Adamson. After a short stay there and at Newcastle-on-Tyne, and again at Berwick, he proceeded to London, where he joined some of the leaders of the Scottish Presbyterian party.

The taking of Stirling Castle in 1585 having changed the political and ecclesiastical positions in the north, he returned to Scotland in November of that year, and was restored to his office at St Andrews. From 1586 to his death he took an active part in Church controversy.

== Other roles ==
In 1589 James was moderator of the General Assembly and on several occasions represented his party in conferences with the court. Despite his antagonism to James VI's episcopal schemes, he appears to have won the king's respect. He answered, with his uncle, a royal summons to London in 1606 for the discussion of Church policy.

The uncompromising attitude of the kinsmen, though it was made the excuse for sending the elder to the Tower, brought no further punishment to James than easy detention within ten miles of Newcastle-on-Tyne. During his residence there it was made clear to him by the king's agents that he would receive high reward if he supported the royal plans. In 1613 negotiations were begun for his return to Scotland, but his health was broken, and he died in exile at Berwick on 20 January 1614.

== Legacies ==
=== Source materials ===
Melville left ample material for the history from the Presbyterian standpoint in correspondence with his uncle Andrew Melville. It was written directly in its descriptions of contemporaries. His sketch of John Knox at St Andrews is one of his best passages.

=== Verse ===
As a writer of verse he compares unfavourably with his uncle. All his pieces, with the exception of a libellus supplex to James VI, are written in Scots. He translated a portion of the Zodiacus vitae of Palingenius, and adapted some passages from Scaliger under the title of Description of the Spainyarts naturall. His Spiritual Propine of a Pastour to his People (1598), The Black Bastill, a lamentation for the kirk (1611), Thrie may keip Counsell, give Twa be away, The Beliefe of the Singing Soul, Davids Tragique Fall, and a number of sonnets show no originality and indifferent technical ability.

The Diary was printed by the Bannatyne Club in 1829, and by the Wodrow Society in 1842. Large portions of it are incorporated in David Calderwood's (1575-1650) History of the Kirk of Scotland (first printed in 1678). For the life and times, see Thomas M'Crie's Life of Andrew Melville.
