= Margaret Calderwood =

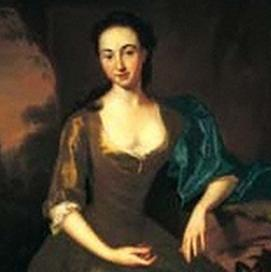
- by Allan Ramsay
- Born: Margaret Steuart; 1715
- Died: 1774 (aged 58–59)
- Known for: Diaries

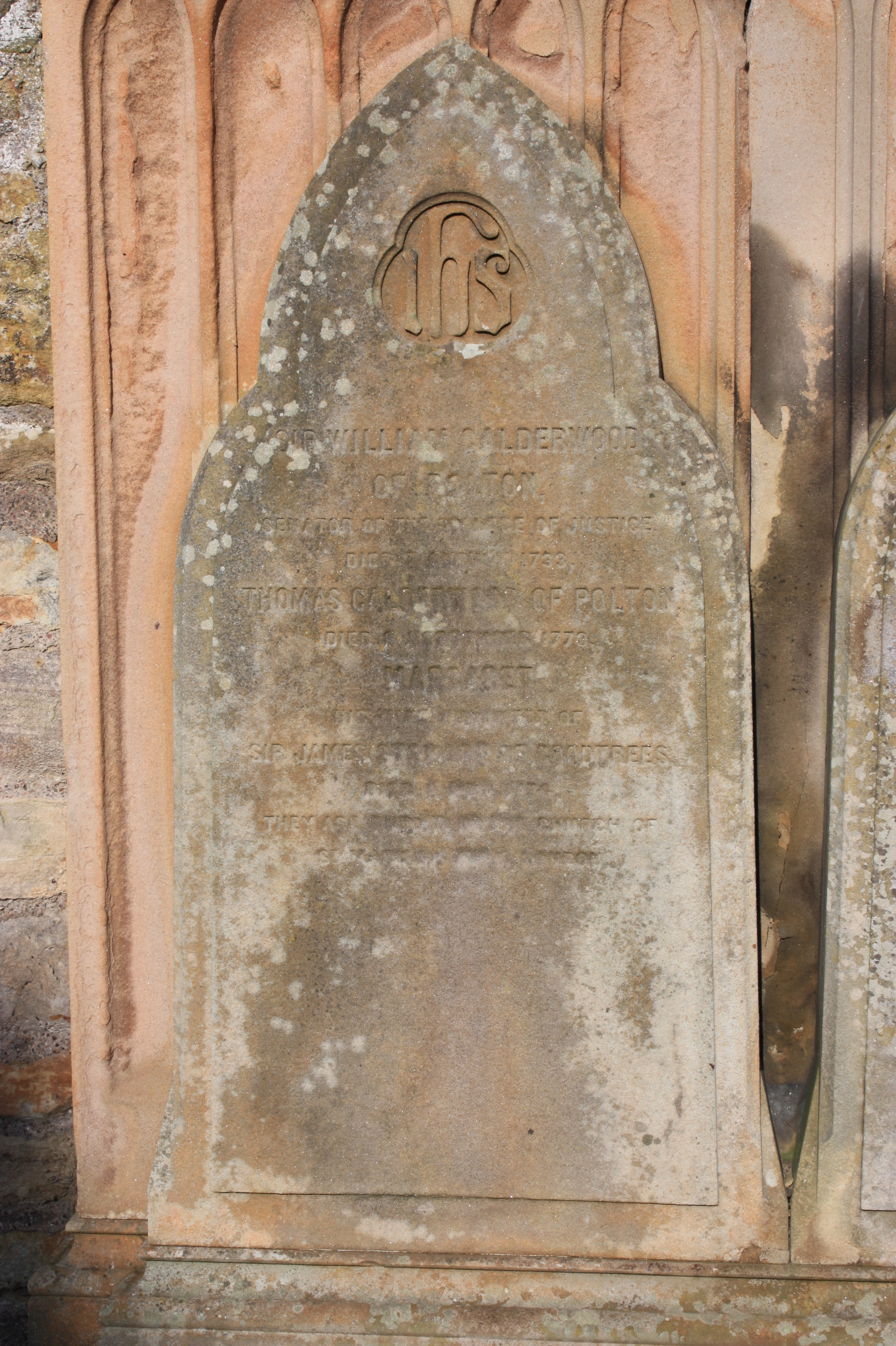
The grave of Margaret Calderwood, Old Kirkyard, Lasswade

Margaret Steuart Calderwood (née Steuart, 1715–1774) was a Scottish diarist just after the Jacobite rising of 1745. She wrote of her journeys through England to Brussels, but this work was not published until the 19th century.

== Family ==
Margaret was the daughter of Sir James Steuart of Coltness, a Steuart baronet.

== Marriage ==
In 1735, the year that she married Thomas Calderwood of Polton, she was painted by the leading Scottish portrait painter Allan Ramsay.

== Journal writer ==
She came to notice when her brother had to go into exile as he was involved in the 1745 rebellion. Calderwood met her brother in Liège and she wrote letters, in addition to keeping a journal from her departure on 3 June 1756. Her brother was living in the southern Netherlands because he was on a list of traitors. She visited him there with her husband, two servants and her sons, William and James.

At the end of 1756 she realised the value of her journals and letters and she was the first to edit them into what she called volumes. They described her journey from Scotland and through England to Rotterdam, Delft, the Hague, Haarlem, and Amsterdam, her meeting in Liège with her brother and on to Brussels. Calderwood describes contemporary transport, food and water, fuel, money, agriculture, religion and education. In a memorable description of her journey through England, Calderwood admires the cows as the people lack what she calls "smartness" more than any other "folks."

== Death and monument in her memory ==
In 1771 Calderwood's brother was forgiven for his traitorous past; he returned to Britain in 1773. Calderwood and her husband died shortly afterwards. In 1774 a monument to Calderwood was commissioned from Robert and James Adam. The monument was probably ordered by her son Lieutenant-Colonel William Calderwood. The monument was not built for Calderwood but the design was used in 1992 to create a monument to Robert Adam in Edinburgh.

She is buried in the old Kirkyard at Lasswade with her husband, in the plot of her father-in-law, Sir William Calderwood, Lord Polton.

== Wider circulation of her diaries ==
Calderwood's diaries were published more widely in 1884; previously they had only been circulated via the Maitland Club in 1842.
