= Lord Archibald Hamilton (1769–1827) =

Scottish politician

Lord Archibald Hamilton (17 March 1769 – 28 August 1827) was a Scottish politician.

Born in 1769 to Lady Harriet Stewart, and her husband, Lord Archibald Douglas-Hamilton, Hamilton matriculated at Christ Church, Oxford on 23 April 1788. He received his BA in 1792 and his MA in 1795. On 14 October 1790, he was admitted to Lincoln's Inn, and called to the bar in 1799.

He was elected Member of Parliament for Lanarkshire in 1802.

He served as MP for 26 years, opposing the governments of Addington and Pitt, and was an advocate of Burgh reform, something that would occur 8 years after his death with the Burgh Police (Scotland) Act, 1833

Hamilton was also Colonel of the Lanarkshire Militia and Lord Rector of the University of Glasgow in 1811.

Parliament of the United Kingdom
Preceded by Sir James Steuart-Denholm Bt.	Member of Parliament for Lanarkshire; 1802–1826	Succeeded by Sir Michael Shaw-Stewart, Bt
