= James Steuart (economist) =

Scottish nobleman and economist (1712–1780)

Sir James Steuart Bt
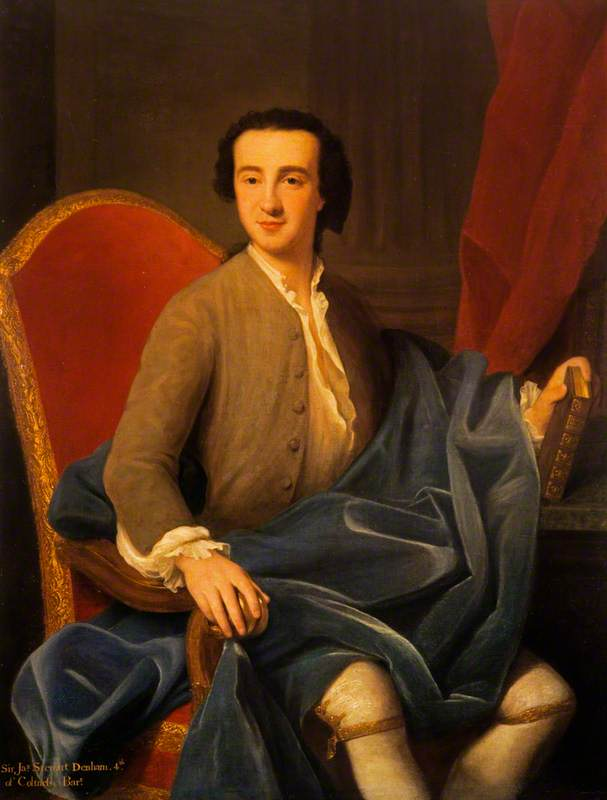
- Portrait by Domenico Duprà, c. 1739
- Born: 21 October 1712; Edinburgh, Scotland
- Died: 26 November 1780 (aged 68); Coltness, Lanarkshire, Scotland
- Education: University of Edinburgh
- Occupation: Economist
- Spouse: Lady Frances Wemyss
- Children: Sir James Steuart Denham
- Parent(s): Sir James Steuart; Anne Dalrymple
- Relatives: Sir James Stewart (grandfather); Lord North Berwick (grandfather); David Wemyss, Lord Elcho (brother-in-law)

Sir James Steuart, 3rd Baronet of Goodtrees and 7th Baronet of Coltness (/ˈstjuːərt/; 21 October 1712 – 26 November 1780), also known as Sir James Steuart Denham, was a prominent Scottish Jacobite and author of "probably the first systematic treatise written in English about economics" and the first book in English with 'political economy' in the title. He assumed the surname of Denham late in life; he inherited his cousin's baronetcy of Coltness in 1773.

== Life ==
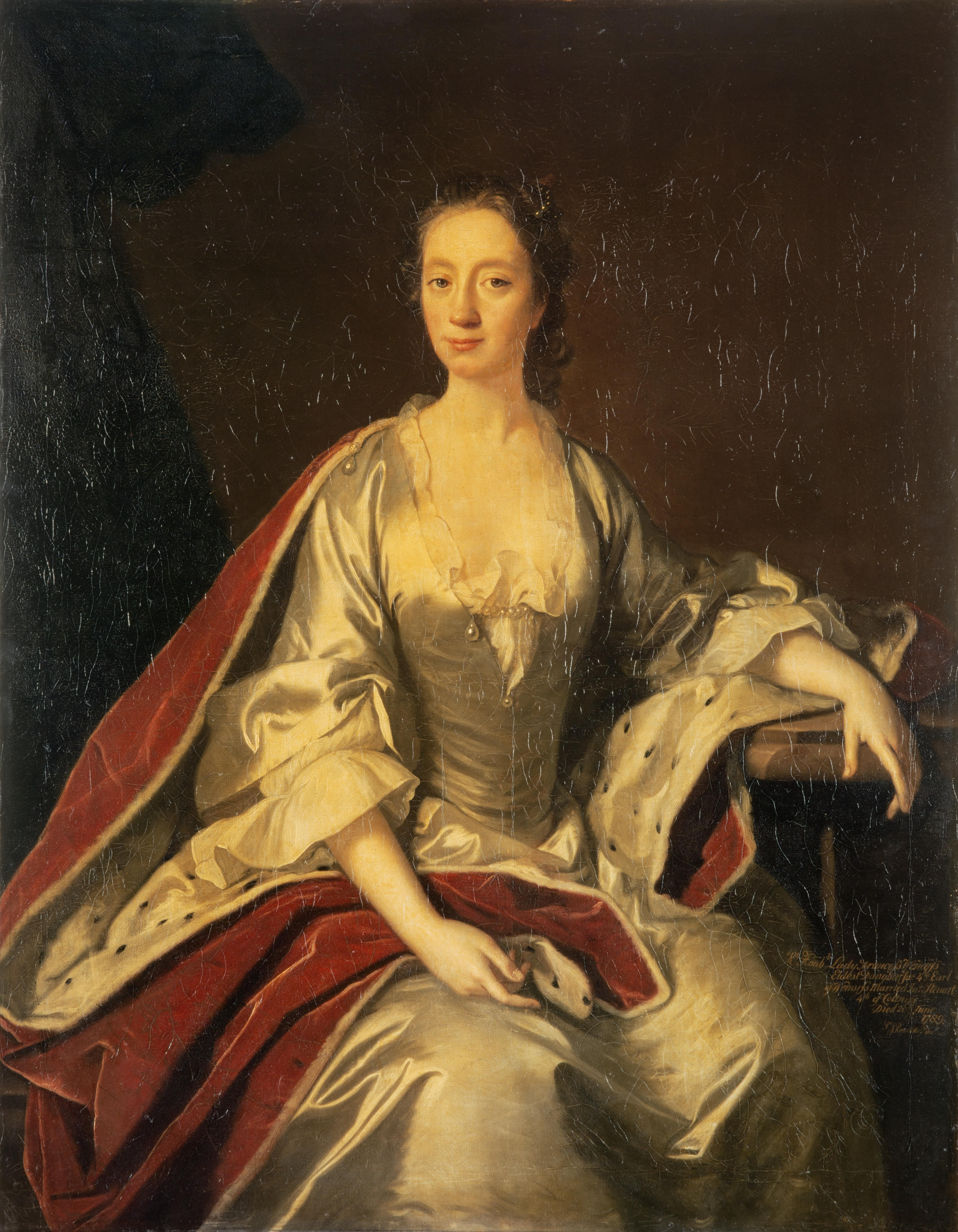
Lady Frances Wemyss (1722–1789), Lady Steuart Denham, painting attributed to Allan Ramsay, c.1740.

He was one of 12 children of Sir James Stewart, 1st Baronet, Solicitor General for Scotland under Queen Anne and George I, and was born in Edinburgh. His mother was Anne Dalrymple, daughter of Lord North Berwick, the Lord President of the Court of Session. After graduating from the University of Edinburgh he was admitted to the Scottish bar at the age of twenty-four.

He then spent some years on the Continent, and while in Rome entered into relations with the Young Pretender, Charles Edward Stuart. He was in Edinburgh in 1745, and so compromised himself that, after the battle of Culloden, he found it necessary to return to the Continent, where he remained until 1763. It was not until 1771 that he was fully pardoned for any complicity he may have had in the rebellion. He died at his family seat, Coltness, in Lanarkshire.

He married Lady Frances Wemyss (1722–1789), younger sister of David Wemyss, Lord Elcho, who played a prominent role in the 1745 Rising. Their son, Sir James Steuart Denham (1744-1839), edited his father's works, was a Member of Parliament, and Colonel of the Scots Greys. He ended his career as a General and lived to be ninety-five; on his death, both baronetcies went to a cousin who died in 1851, since when they have been dormant.

=== Family ===
Steuart was descended from another Sir James Stewart, knight, an Edinburgh merchant and staunch Presbyterian, who supported Charles II in the British Civil Wars of 1642-1660 and who died in 1681, having made enough money to purchase landed estates for his sons; three of those sons were prominent enough to have their families receive the title of Baronet after the Glorious Revolution of 1688. They were: Sir Thomas Steuart of Coltness, the first son; Sir James Steuart of Goodtrees, Lord Advocate, the fourth son; Sir Robert Steuart of Allandale, the youngest of the seven sons. The Lord Advocate, Sir James Steuart of Goodtrees, was his grandfather; his father, also Sir James Steuart, was the eldest son of the Lord Advocate, and rose to be Solicitor General for Scotland.

=== Titles ===
The 3rd Baronet of Goodtrees, the subject of this article, inherited his baronetcy and estates at the age of fourteen. He eventually acquired much of the possession of his cousins, the senior line of Steuarts. Sir Thomas Steuart of Coltness, had married twice: to Margaret Elliot, his step-mother's daughter, and then to Susan Denham, the sister of Sir William Denham, 1st Baronet of Westshield, Master of the Mint for Scotland, and had fourteen sons by them. His eldest son had sold the estate and mansion (but not the title) of Coltness to 3rd Baronet of Goodtrees' father, in 1712. The 3rd Baronet of Goodtrees is, therefore, often called of Coltness, since it was his house.

The 3rd Baronet of Goodtrees, however, eventually sold the estate of Goodtrees after he returned from France. By that time, the last surviving son of Sir Thomas Steuart had inherited the Coltness baronetcy from his father as well as the property and baronetcy of Denham of Westshield through his mother, styling himself Sir Archibald Steuart Denham, Baronet. When Sir Archibald died, in 1773, the baronetcy of Coltness, and the Steuart property, passed to Sir James Steuart; the Denham title and property passed to the last heir of the Denhams, Sir Archibald's half-nephew on his mother's side, who took the style of Sir William Lockhart Denham. When he died, three years later, in 1776, the Denham baronetcy became extinct; he also left his property, including the estate of Westshield, to Sir James Steuart, who then assumed the name of Denham, although he was not descended from.

For the last four years of his life, therefore, he was Sir James Steuart Denham, Baronet, of Coltness and Westshield. His major book and his posthumous collected works were published as by Sir James Steuart; economic literature also calls him Sir James Steuart Denham.

== Works ==
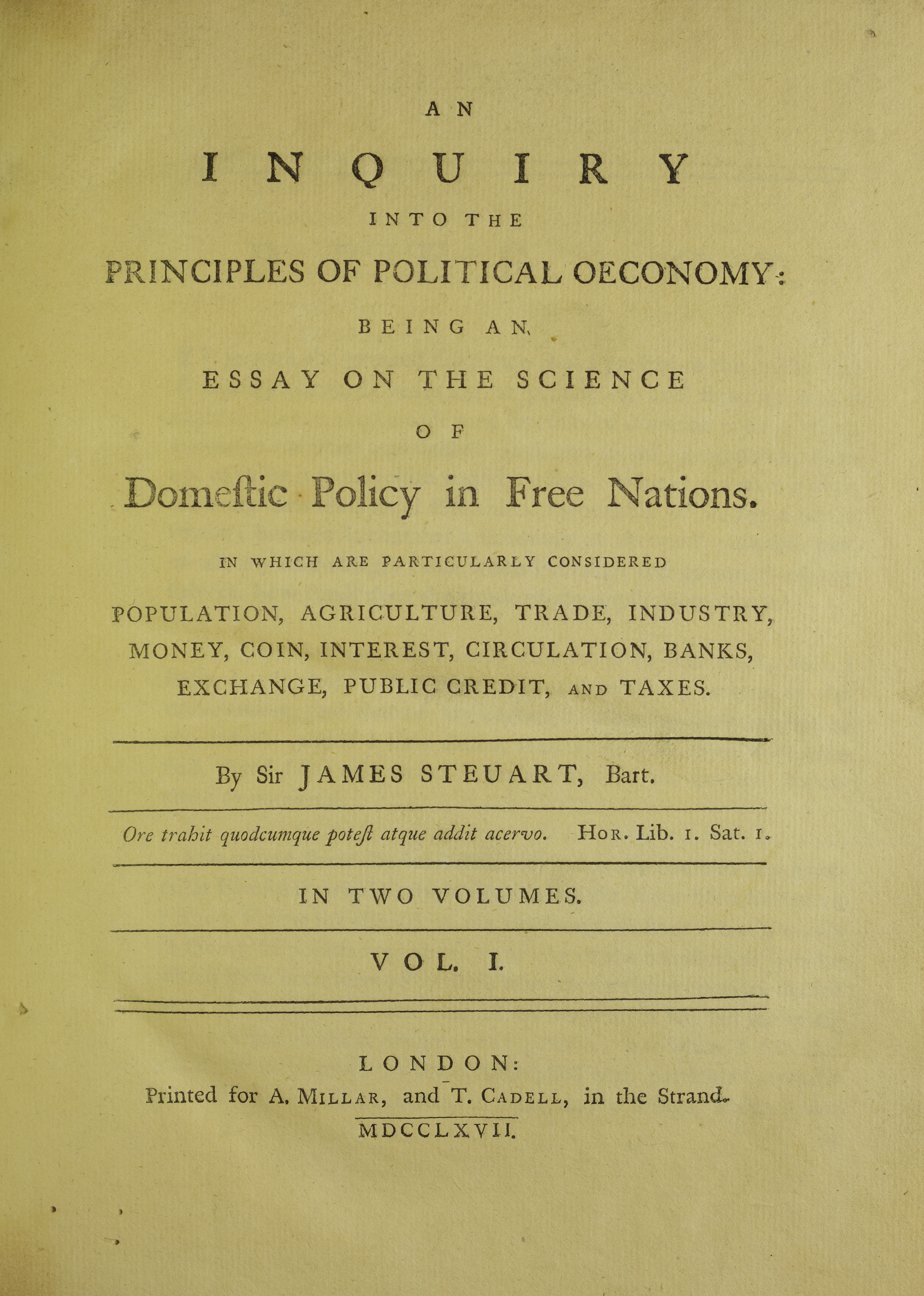
Inquiry into the principles of political economy, 1767

In 1767 Steuart published An Inquiry into the Principles of Political Economy, the first book by a Scottish economist with 'political economy' in the title, explaining usage of the term as that:

[just as] economy in general [is] the art of providing for all the wants of a family, [so the science of political economy] seeks to secure a certain fund of subsistence for all the inhabitants, to obviate every circumstance which may render it precarious; to provide every thing necessary for supplying the wants of the society, and to employ the inhabitants ... in such manner as naturally to create reciprocal relations and dependencies between them, so as to supply one another with reciprocal wants.

The book was the most complete and systematic survey of the science from the point of view of moderate mercantilism which had appeared in England and indeed the first full-fledged economics treatise to appear anywhere. Also the German philosopher Hegel recognized that book and wrote a comment about it in the year 1799. Although often regarded as part of the Scottish Enlightenment which produced David Hume and Adam Smith, Steuart's economics hark back to the earlier Mercantilist era.

Mercantilism was the school of thought that held that a positive balance of trade was of primary importance for any nation and required a ban on the export of gold and silver. This theory led to high protective tariffs to maximize the use of domestic resources, colonial expansion and exclusivity of trade with those colonies. British attempts to follow the mercantilist ideas led to the four Anglo-Dutch navigation wars and the American colonials wars of 1776-1781 and 1812. Additionally in 1815, Britain adopted the high tariff, called the corn laws on all imported wheat at the suggestion of mercantilist advisors. Debate over the corn laws would be harsh and would dominate the political discussion and occupy all British governments until the corn laws were repealed in 1846.

At the level of any individual sales transaction, mercantilism held that profit was developed at the point of the sale. Steuart held that profit was a mere "surcharge" upon alienation (sale) of the commodity. Steuart was not a pure mercantilist, however, he believed in a "scientific form of mercantilism." Steuart held that all profit arose from the seller "overcharging" the buyer in any single sales transaction. However, Steuart did allow that the "profit" obtained through exchange would "fluctuate" with the rise and/or fall in demand. Still like all good mercantilists, Steuart's eye remained on the exchange as the creator of profit and he recognized no value in a commodity before the sale.

Steuart was one of the last representatives of the mercantilist school of economic thought.

Although the work appears to have been well received its impact was overshadowed by Smith's Wealth of Nations that was published only nine years later. Adam Smith never quotes or mentions Steuart's book, although he was acquainted with him. Moreover, the attacks on Mercantilism in the Wealth of Nations appear to have been mainly directed against Steuart. As Smith appears to have thought that Steuart's conversation was better than his book, he probably wished to keep clear of controversy with him. Steuart's book was received much more favourably a century later by the members of the Historical school of economics.

== Bibliography ==
- The Works, Political, Metaphysical and Chronological, of the late Sir James Steuart of Coltness, Bart., now first collected, with Anecdotes of the Author, by his Son, General Sir James Denham Steuart, were published in 6 vols 8vo in 1805. Besides the Inquiry they include:
- A Dissertation upon the Doctrine and Principles of Money applied to the German Coin (1758)
- Apologie du sentiment de M. le Chevalier Newton sur l'ancienne chronologie des Grecs (4to, Frankfort-on-the-Main, 1757)
- An Inquiry into the Principles of Political Oeconomy: Being an Essay on the Science of Domestic Policy in Free Nations, in Which Are Particularly Considered Population, Agriculture, Trade, Industry, Money, Coin, Interest, Circulation, Banks, Exchange, Public Credit, and Taxes, ([1767, 2 v.] 1770). Title page and chapter links, [c], v. 2, and v. 1.
- The Principles of Money applied to the Present State ef Bengal, published at the request of the East India Company (4to, 1772)
- A Dissertation on the Policy of Grain (1783)
- Plan for introducing Uniformity in Weights and Measures within the Limits of the British Empire (1790)
- Observations on Beattie's Essay on Truth
- A Dissertation concerning the Motive of Obedience to the Law of God, and other treatises.

Baronetage of Nova Scotia
Preceded by Archibald Steuart	Baronet (of Coltness); 1773–1780	Succeeded by James Seuart Denham
Preceded by James Steuart	Baronet (of Goodtrees); 1727–1780	Succeeded by James Seuart Denham
