= Sir James Steuart Denham, 8th Baronet =

Scottish soldier

General Sir James Steuart Denham, 8th and 4th Baronet (August 1744 – 12 August 1839) was a Scottish soldier of the British Army.

== Birth and education ==
He was born James Steuart, the only son of Sir James Steuart, 2nd Baronet, of Coltness in Lanarkshire, by his wife Lady Frances, daughter of David Wemyss, 4th Earl of Wemyss. The year after his birth, during the Jacobite Rising of 1745, his father attended the court of Charles Edward Stuart at Holyroodhouse, and consequently had to leave Scotland with his wife. Young James was left with the family of William Mure of Caldwell. He was then educated at Angoulême from 1749 until he and his parents were forced by the looming Seven Years' War to move to Flanders in 1755. He attended the University of Tübingen from 1757 to 1761.

== Early military career ==
On 17 March 1761 Steuart was made a cornet in the 1st (Royal) Regiment of Dragoons (General Conway's regiment), through the influence of his father's friend Lord Barrington. He served with the regiment in Germany until the end of the Seven Years' War in 1763. On 13 January 1763, passing over the rank of lieutenant, he was promoted to captain in the 105th Regiment of Foot (Queen's Own Royal Regiment of Highlanders), but when the regiment was disbanded in 1764 he was placed on half pay.

From 1764 to 1766 he travelled in France and Germany, studying the cavalry tactics and organisation there, and then was appointed to command a troop of the 5th (or Royal Irish) Regiment of Dragoons, joining the regiment in Ireland. In 1769 he was an aide-de-camp to the Lord Lieutenant, Lord Townshend. He was promoted to major in the 13th Regiment of Dragoons on 6 November 1772, transferring to the 1st Irish Horse on 26 September 1775. On 15 July 1776 he went back to the 13th (now Light Dragoons) as lieutenant-colonel, a command he would hold for the next fifteen years.

== Succession and Member of Parliament ==
Steuart's father had been allowed to return home after the end of the war in 1763, and was formally pardoned in 1771. In 1773 he succeeded his cousin Sir Archibald Steuart Denham as 7th Baronet, of Coltness (his own baronetcy was "of Goodtrees", which he had sold in 1756; Coltness had been purchased from the senior branch of the family in 1712). In 1776 he inherited the estate of Westshield from Sir William Lockhart Denham, 6th Baronet, and the Steuarts father and son adopted the surname of Denham, being known as Denham in England and Steuart in Scotland. James Steuart Denham the younger succeeded his father in the baronetcies of Coltness and Goodtrees and the estates of Coltness and Westshield on 26 November 1780.

On 29 April 1784 Denham was elected Member of Parliament for Lanarkshire through the influence of the Duke of Hamilton. Though a cousin of the Whigs Henry and Thomas Erskine and the independent Francis Charteris, he had been elected as a supporter of William Pitt the Younger and voted with the government, including for parliamentary reform in 1785. At the general elections of 1790 and 1796 he was re-elected unopposed. He is not known to have spoken in Parliament and devoted most of his time to his military career.

== Later military career ==
Denham spent much time and money on the command of the 13th, showing himself a capable commander in the transition to the light cavalry role and in devising new exercises. He was promoted brevet colonel on 20 November 1782, and in 1788 was appointed by Sir William Augustus Pitt, the commander-in-chief in Ireland, as President of a commission to improve the discipline and organisation of the cavalry in Ireland. His recommendations were favourably received, and officially adopted after review by David Dundas. In March 1789, having commanded his regiment thirteen years, he requested to be made colonel of an infantry regiment, hoping for the 20th or 71st. He made further requests for the 14th in October, the 41st in December, the 56th in January 1790 and the 74th in April 1791, all without success. He was finally appointed colonel of the 12th (The Prince of Wales's) Regiment of (Light) Dragoons on 9 November 1791.

In 1793 the 12th were ordered to Toulon and Denham was to have gone out as a brigadier-general, but never sailed and was instead promoted to major-general in October that year. In 1794 he was intended to command the cavalry to be sent to Flanders under Lord Cornwallis, but the expedition was cancelled. Instead he was appointed (at the suggestion of Henry Dundas) to organise regiments of fencible cavalry in Scotland, and he commanded them in summer camps in 1795, 1796 and 1797, though initially refusing the post owing to rheumatism and depression.

In autumn 1797 he went back to Ireland as commander of the forces in Munster, with local rank of lieutenant-general. With the approval of the commander-in-chief, Sir Ralph Abercromby, he ensured that military officers in his district would not act as justices of the peace, and in March 1798 he organised the yeomanry and militia of Munster into night patrols, improving discipline for the volunteers and relieving the burden on the regular forces. He was made substantive lieutenant-general on 1 January 1798.

Denham's "nervous complaint" meant that he relied increasingly on his subordinates. When the Irish Rebellion of 1798 broke out, its suppression in Munster was largely the work of Major-General Henry Johnson, who won the Battle of New Ross, Brigadier-General John Moore, who won the Battle of Foulksmills and took Wexford, and the new commander-in-chief Gerard Lake.

== Retirement and death ==
Denham finally resigned his command in Ireland in 1799, though he denied this was because of his health. 1799 also saw the death of Denham's political patron the Duke of Hamilton, and the new Duke had two sons with parliamentary ambitions. Denham reminded the government of his consistent support, but when Lord Archibald Hamilton declared himself as prospective candidate in 1801 the Hamilton influence was too strong. Not wanting to be defeated, Denham withdrew his candidacy on 11 July 1802 and Hamilton was returned unopposed in the general election.

He saw no further military service, but was made full general in 1803, colonel of the 2nd (Royal North British) Regiment of Dragoons in 1815, and a Knight Grand Cross of the Royal Guelphic Order. At the 1818 general election he was a noted supporter of Sir Alexander Cochrane against Hamilton in Lanarkshire, without success.

Sir James Steuart Denham died at Cheltenham in his ninety-fifth year; at the time of his death he was the senior general in the British Army. He had married on 30 September 1772 Alicia, daughter of William Blacker of Carrick Blacker, County Armagh, but they had no children, so he was succeeded in the baronetcies by his second cousin Henry Steuart Barclay.

Parliament of Great Britain
Preceded by Andrew Stuart	Member of Parliament for Lanarkshire; 1784–1800	Succeeded by Parliament of the United Kingdom
Parliament of the United Kingdom
Preceded by Parliament of Great Britain	Member of Parliament for Lanarkshire; 1801–1802	Succeeded by Lord Archibald Hamilton
Military offices
Preceded by Hon. George Lane Parker	Colonel of the 12th (The Prince of Wales's); Regiment of (Light) Dragoons; 1791–1815	Succeeded by Sir William Payne
Preceded by The Marquess of Lothian	Colonel of the 2nd (Royal North British); Regiment of Dragoons; 1815–1839	Succeeded by Sir William Keir Grant
Baronetage of Nova Scotia
Preceded by James Steuart	Baronet (of Coltness); 1780–1839	Succeeded by Henry Steuart Barclay
Preceded by James Steuart	Baronet (of Goodtrees); 1780–1839	Succeeded by Henry Steuart Barclay
