= Wodrow Society =

The Wodrow Society, established in Edinburgh in 1841, was a society 'for the publication of the works of the fathers and early writers of the Reformed Church of Scotland'.

The society, established in May 1841, was named after Robert Wodrow, the historian of the Covenanters. It ceased to publish in 1851.

== Publications ==
- James Melville, The Autobiography and Diary of Mr. James Melvill, Minister of Kilrenny, in Fife, and Professor of Theology in the University of St Andrews, with a Continuation of the Diary, edited by Robert Pitcairn, 1842
- John Row, The History of the Kirk of Scotland, from the year 1558 to August 1637: With a continuation to July 1639, 1842
- David Calderwood, The History of the Kirk of Scotland, 1842–49.
  - volume one
  - volume two
  - volume three
  - volume four
  - volume five
  - volume six
  - volume seven
  - volume eight
- David Laing, ed., The Miscellany of the Wodrow Society, containing tracts and original letters chiefly relating to the ecclesiastical affairs of Scotland during the sixteenth and seventeenth centuries, 1844
  - volume one
- Robert Rollock, Select Works of Robert Rollock, ed. William Maxwell Gunn, 1844
  - volume one
  - volume two
- William King Tweedie, ed., Select Biographies, 1845
  - volume one
  - volume two
- John Knox, History of the Reformation... within... Scotland, ed. David Laing, 2 vols., 1848
- William Row, The Life of Mr. Robert Blair, Minister of St. Andrews, containing his autobiography, from 1593-1636; with supplement of his life and continuation of the history of the times, to 1680, ed. Thomas M'Crie, 1848
- Charles Ferme, A logical analysis of the Epistle of Paul to the Romans, translated from the Latin by William Skae, ed. William Lindsay Alexander, 1850
