= Boysack =

Coordinates: 56.631297°N 2.619389°W

- Location within Angus
- OS grid reference: NO621490
- Council area: Angus
- Lieutenancy area: Angus
- Country: Scotland
- Sovereign state: United Kingdom
- Police: Scotland
- Fire: Scottish
- Ambulance: Scottish

Boysack is a village in Angus, Scotland, four miles north of Arbroath.

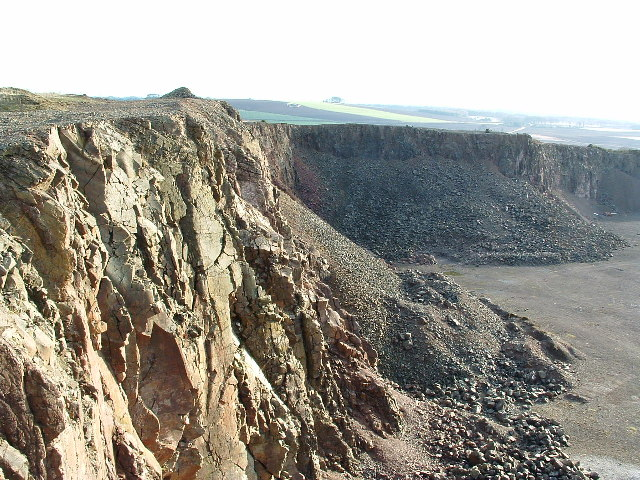
Quarry near Boysack

== Notable residents ==
- John Carnegie (c. 1679/80 – by May 1750), lawyer, politician and Jacobite rebel.
