= Pearlin Jean =

Pearlin Jean is the name given to a ghost, who purportedly haunts the Allanbank Courtyard, situated in Allanton, Berwickshire, Scotland. The courtyard was previously the site of a dower house called Allanbank of the country estate of the now demolished Blackadder House. The ghost's name is derived from the eye-witness' claim that she is seen covered in the similarly named lace, with which the Laird of Allanbank tried to buy her silence about the affair.

Though the story has consistently situated the ghost at the estate, the woman who came to be Pearlin Jean had her origins in Paris. Legend states that she was the lover of the Laird of Sir Robert Stewart, he was made a Baronet in 1684), and a Nun of Charity (as she was not confined to a cloister).

Though their affair lasted for a long time, the Laird left Paris to return to his estate in Scotland. It is speculated that the Laird had become unfaithful, but he could also have been called back by his family to wed the daughter of Sir John Gilmour. Jean attempted to physically stop Stewart from leaving her by stepping out in front of his carriage. He ordered his driver to carry on regardless, and the woman fell. The wheels of the carriage then ran over her forehead, killing her. Her last words to Robert were: "I'll be in Scotland before you."

In what appeared to be a fulfilling of her prophecy, as Stewart arrived back on his estate for the first time, he saw his ex-lover sitting on top of the entrance to the estate, with blood covering her head and shoulders. This first sighting was at least prior to 1697. After this incident, seven local ministers from the Church of the Reformed Faith were asked to congregate in the house to exorcise the ghost to no avail. The household decided to hang the woman's portrait between the laird and his wife's, though when removed in a fit of jealousy by Lady Stewart, the house would become 'disquiet' again. The ghost was said to slam doors, open windows and walk throughout the house at all times of the day and night. As time progressed, Pearlin Jean's ghostly figure became that of a skeleton in Pearlin lace, rather than the figure seen by the first laird, dripping with blood. After the laird's death, her appearances were unsurprising to the staff, being reportedly unmenacing.

The portrait of Pearlin Jean was later given to a knight, though its current whereabouts is unknown.

In the 1700s, Thomas Blackadder was said to be infatuated with the figure of Pearlin Jean, and went to meet her in the courtyard. As soon as he realised the nature of the woman, he became incredibly frightened. Later in the century, 1790, ladies of the court reported being disturbed throughout their stay at the estate by footsteps pacing up and down their chambers.

The legend was immortalised in song in the 1800s, the known lyrics of which are:

O Pearlin' Jean, O Pearlin' Jean,
She haunts the house, she haunts the green
And glowers on us a' wi' her wullcat e'en

And

For all the silver in English bank,
Nor yet for all the gold,
Would I pass through the hall of Allanbank
When the midnight bell has toll'd

After the main house was demolished in the 1800s, with a bowling green being placed over the foundations, the ghost has faded into history, with no contemporary sightings. Even after this, in the beginnings of the 20th century the estate holders found it almost impossible to find tenants for the land. Many prospective inhabitants dropped out after they heard about Pearlin Jean.

== Bibliography ==
- Henderson, George (1856). The Popular Rhymes, Sayings and Proverbs of the County of Berwick; with illustrative notes. Newcastle-upon-Tyne: S. W. Crow.
- Lang, Jean (1913). North and South of Tweed; Stories and Legends of the Borders. Edinburgh: T.C. & E.C. Jack.
- Seafield, Lily (2010). Scottish Ghosts. New Lanark: Waverly Books.
- Ingram, J.H. (1912). Haunted Homes and Family Traditions of Great Britain. London: Reeves and Turner.
- Lang, Andrew and John (1914). Highways and Byways in the Border. London: MacMillan and Co.
