= Walter Gregor =

Scottish folklorist and cleric, 1825–1897

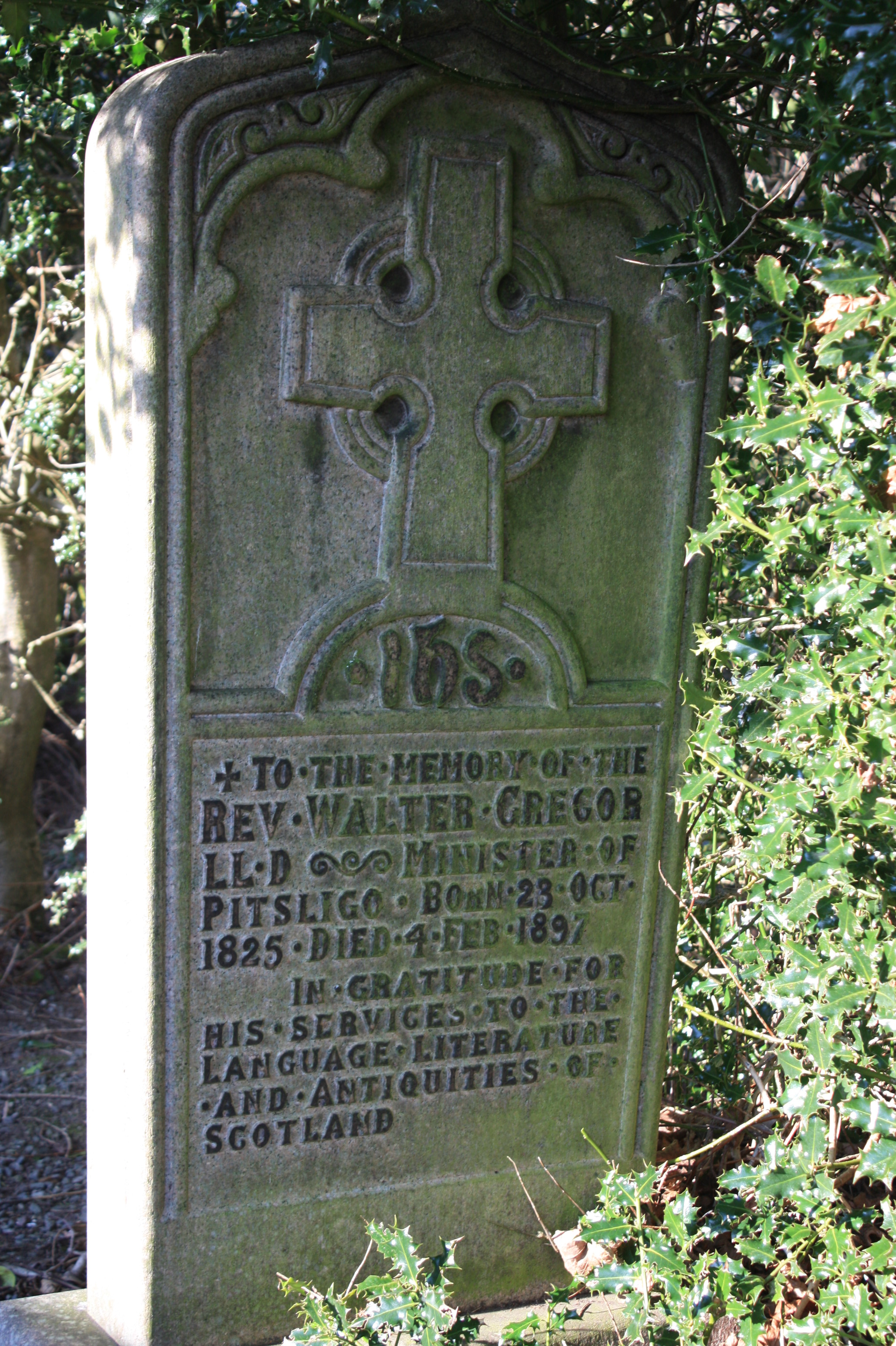
The grave of Rev Walter Gregor, Lasswade Cemetery

Walter Gregor (1825–1897) was a Scottish folklorist, linguist and minister of religion. His anthropological research work won him an international reputation.

== Life ==
The son of James Gregor, a tenant farmer of Forgieside, near Keith, Banffshire, Walter Gregor was born on 23 October 1825. He obtained an MA at King's College, Aberdeen, then took the position of Master at Macduff Parish School, in a small village on Moray Firth.

Gregor completed his degree in divinity at the age of 32, and a series of earlier appointments led to his placement in 1863 at the Parish of Pitsligo by Queen Victoria. He spoke French and Hebrew and gained an international reputation for his broad studies and discoveries. Gregor's field collections and writing were often focused on archaeology and folklore, but his interest and publications extended to a wide range of subjects.

Gregor was a published member of the Folklore Society, New Spalding Club, and Scottish Text Society. His works extended to a series of books and over 65 papers, which appeared in French, English, and Spanish. His books included Glossary of Words not in Jamieson's Scottish Dictionary (1866), Echo of Olden Times from the North of Scotland (1881), and Notes on the Folk-Lore of the North-East of Scotland for the Folk-Lore Society (1881).

He died on 4 February 1897 at Bonnyrigg, two years after his retirement there. He is buried in the small north cemetery at Lasswade on the north side of the entrance path, with his wife, Margaret Aven Gardiner (1837–1906). They were survived by a son and a daughter.

== Recognition ==
An excerpt of the original obituary in the Journal of the Folklore Society was reprinted in their centennial review of his contribution, "His name appears on the first list of members of the Folk-Lore Society; and among the early publications of the Society were his Notes on the Folk-Lore of the North-East of Scotland. To know this book is to recognise its value as a transcript of the superstitions and traditions of a district rich in remains of the past up to that time unrecorded. Its author, however, was by no means content to rest on the reputation its publication immediately won, for he was an indefatigable collector. Frequent communications to the Folk-Lore Society and to the Société des Traditions Populaires, of which he was also a member, attest his continued industry."
