= Lasswade =

Coordinates: 55.883°N 3.117°W

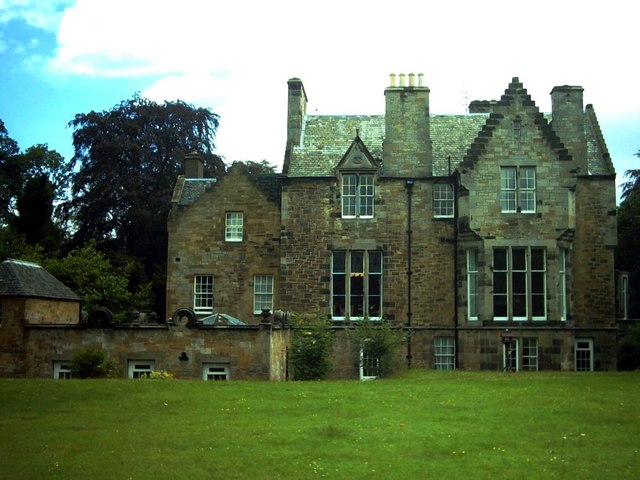
- Pittendreich House, Lasswade by David Bryce

- Location within Midlothian
- OS grid reference: NT301661
- Council area: Midlothian
- Lieutenancy area: Midlothian
- Country: Scotland
- Sovereign state: United Kingdom
- Post town: LASSWADE
- Postcode district: EH18
- Dialling code: 0131
- Police: Scotland
- Fire: Scottish
- Ambulance: Scottish
- UK Parliament: Midlothian
- Scottish Parliament: Midlothian North and Musselburgh

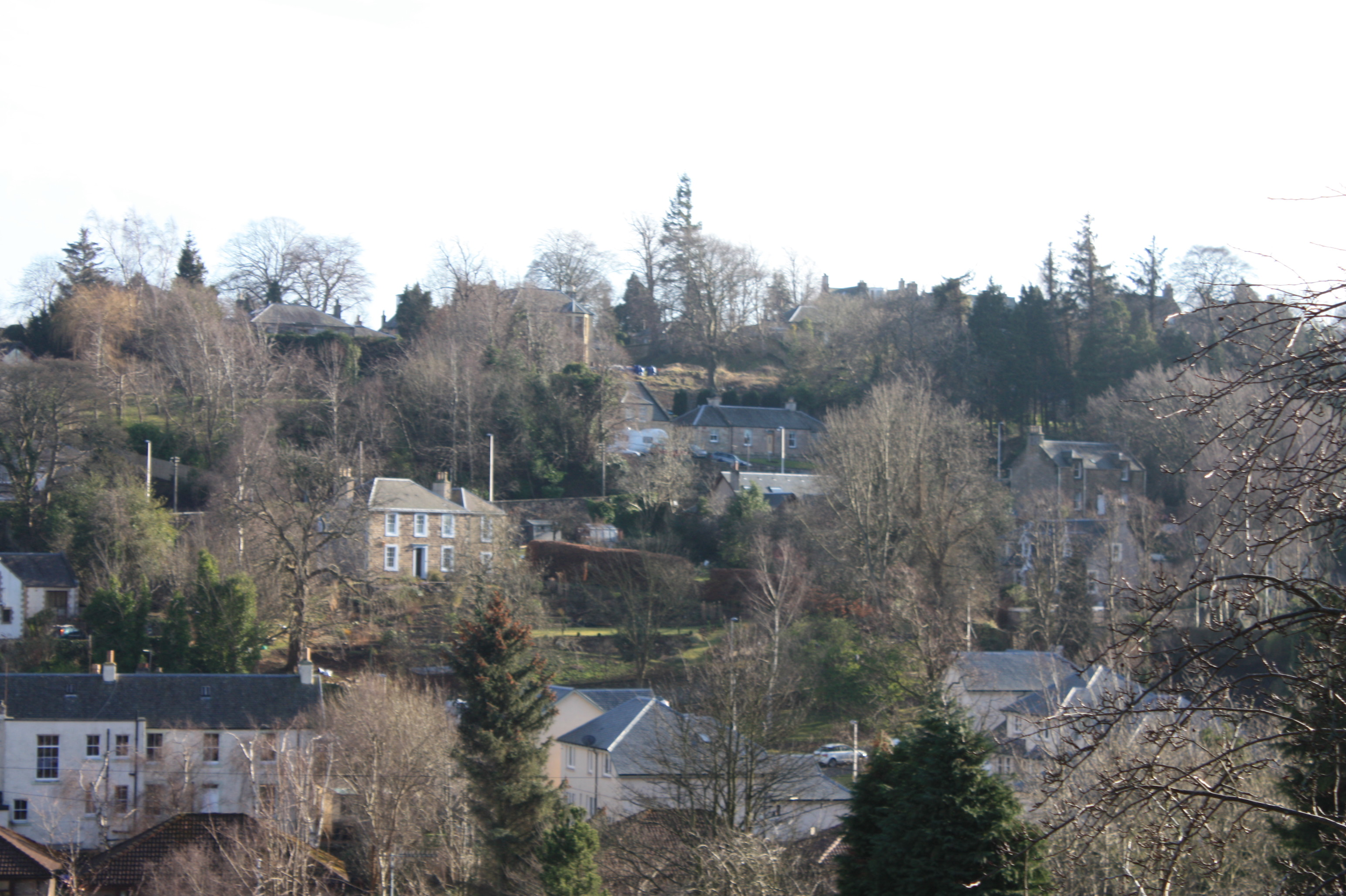
The houses on the southern side of the river in Lasswade

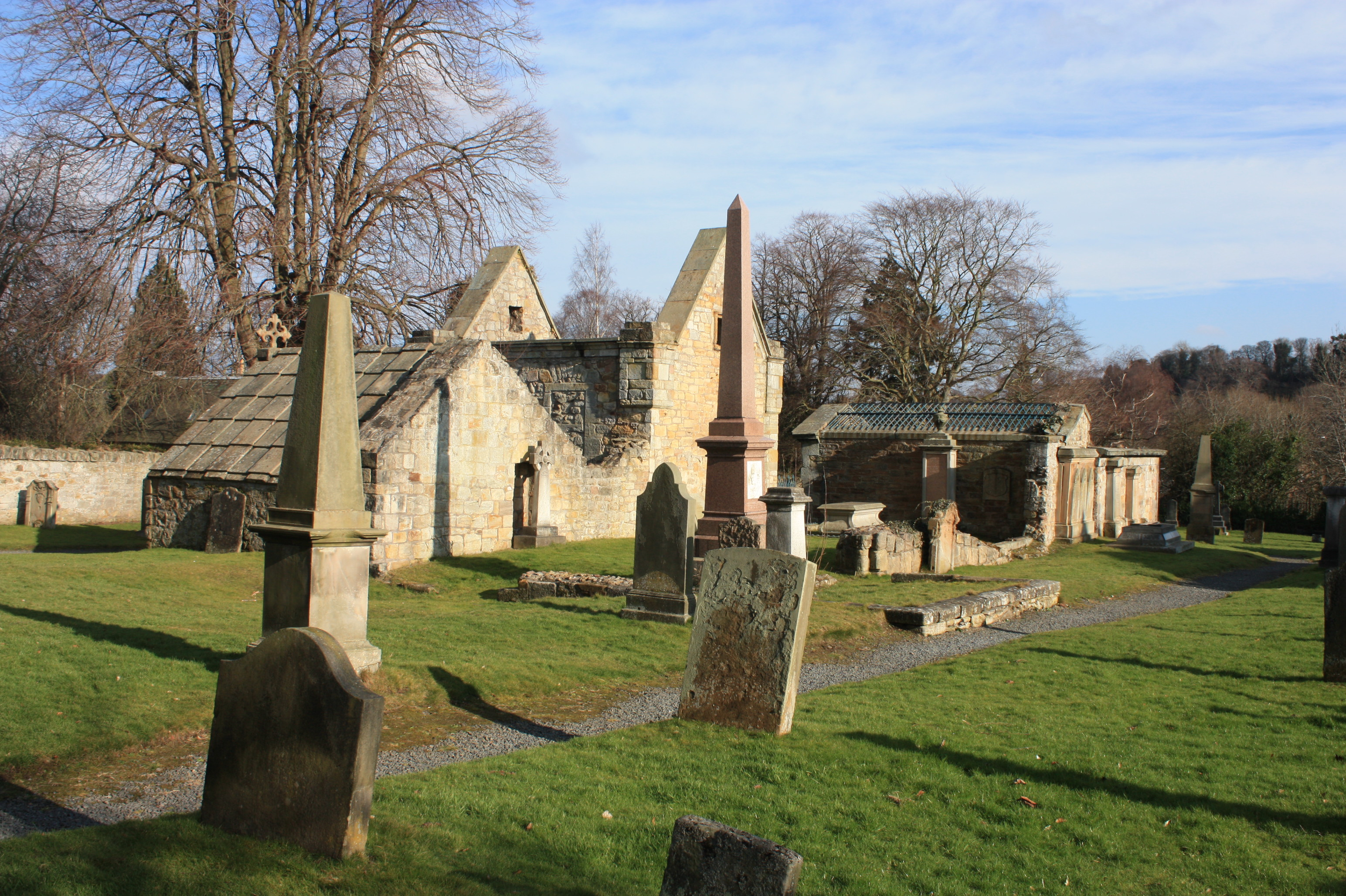
The Old Kirkyard, Lasswade

Lasswade is a village and civil parish in Midlothian, Scotland, on the River North Esk, nine miles (14 kilometres) south of Edinburgh city centre, contiguous with Bonnyrigg and between Dalkeith to the east and Loanhead to the west. Melville Castle lies to the north east. The Gaelic form is Leas Bhaid, meaning the "clump at the fort."

Lasswade lies within the Edinburgh Green Belt. Most of the population is retired or commutes to Edinburgh to work. There are, however, several local businesses, including horse riding stables (Edinburgh & Lasswade Riding Centre), golf driving ranges and golf courses (Kings Acre Golf Course and Melville Golf Centre), an alpine plant nursery (Kevock Garden Plants) a pub (The Laird and Dog) and a restaurant (The Paper Mill). There is also an athletics club formed in 1981.

== Etymology and name ==
The name Lasswade may be derived from the Brittonic *lï:s meaning "a court, palace administrative centre", and wï:δ, "a wood" (cf. Welsh llys gwŷdd). Also possible is an Old English derivation from the elements lǣswe, "pasture", and wæd, "a ford".

Although the settlement may date back to the 8th century, the first written record of "Leswade" dates to 1150. On William Roy's map of 1750, it appears as Laswaid. Up until the late 18th century, all spelling was unfixed and was based upon the sound as perceived.

According to legend, the area got its name from a sturdy local girl called Jenny, who would wade across the river carrying travellers on her back before a bridge was built. A short verse from the area tells the story as follows:

When there was nae Brig to cross the Esk river,
On Jenny's braid back they a’ gaed the gither,
For Jenny was honest, stout, sober and steady
She carried the Laird, she carried his leddy,
Whin he was richt seated the doggie first gaed,
Then waving his stick he cried “Jenny Lass – Wade!”

== History ==
The old parish church was built in the 13th century, though little of it survives today. It was abandoned in 1793, and much of its ruins collapsed in 1866. The 17th-century Scottish poet William Drummond of Hawthornden was buried within its grounds.

The first paper mill was built in Lasswade in 1750, and papermaking remained important until the start of the 20th century.

Sir John Lauder, 1st Baronet of Fountainhall was born at Melville Mill, Lasswade, in 1595; and the present 18th-century Barony House was known as Lasswade Cottage when Sir Walter Scott rented it (1798–1804). He was visited here by the writer James Hogg (the 'Ettrick Shepherd') and the Wordsworths. Thomas de Quincey, author of Confessions of an English Opium Eater, also lived in nearby Polton for some years, from 1843, in the cottage now known as de Quincey Cottage. The Scottish landscape artist William McTaggart moved to Lasswade in 1889, and many of his later works depict the Moorfoot Hills.

Former 19th-century industries include paper mills, flour mills and a carpet factory. Created a police burgh in 1881, Lasswade merged with Bonnyrigg in 1929. It was a popular holiday resort in the 19th century for wealthy Edinburgh residents; yet, by the 1950s, much of the village's population had left for modern houses in Bonnyrigg.

Groome (1885) noted as chief proprietors in the parish: Lieut.-Col. Gibsone of Pentland, Viscount Melville, Drummond of Hawthornden, Sir Geo. Clerk of Penicuik, and Mrs Durham of Polton. The estates along both banks of the Esk were:

- left bank: Mavisbank House, Dryden Bank, Dryden, and Rosebank
- right bank: Eldin (residence of John Clerk, F.R.S. (1728–1812), inventor of the naval tactic of breaking the enemy's line), Polton, Springfield, Glenesk, Hawthornden, Gorton, and Auchendinny (residence of Henry Mackenzie, the author of The Man of Feeling)

== Other notable buildings ==
The pre-Reformation church was dedicated to St Edwin and under the control of the Dean of Restalrig.

The current Lasswade Parish Church building was originally built in 1830 as a plain box chapel for the former United Presbyterian Church (later United Free Church), it was remodelled by Hardy & Wight in 1894 and became part of the Church of Scotland in 1929. The parish has used this building since 1956, because of a structural fault in the Old Parish Church (subsequently demolished, built in 1793 from plans by John Clerk, Lord Eldin) discovered in the late 1940s.

St Leonard's Episcopal Church on Lower Broomieknowe dates from 1890 and is by Hippolyte Blanc.

The former board school of 1875 stands with commanding views over the village on the northern slopes next to the Old Kirkyard. It is now converted to flats. Lasswade High School moved to its current premises in the west of Bonnyrigg in 1956, being rebuilt on the same site in 2013.

== Parish ==
The parish of Lasswade is bounded on the north by the City of Edinburgh (namely the former parishes of Colinton and Liberton), on the east, by Dalkeith, Newbattle, Cockpen and Carrington, on the south by Penicuik and on the west by Glencorse. It extends about 7 miles from north to south and its greatest breadth is about 6 miles. Prior to 1633 the north-east salient of the parish, around Melville Castle, formed the separate parish of Melville and Lugton.

The parish lies between the Pentland Hills to the north and the Moorfoot Hills to the south and includes the easternmost part of the Pentland Hills, around the estate of Pentland. The River North Esk flows into the parish from the south-west and, after forming the western boundary, then cuts through the centre of the parish, flowing north-easterly towards the village of Lasswade. At Lasswade the river forms the boundary on the north-east side, such that the suburb of Westmill on the south-east bank lies in the parish of Cockpen.

The chief antiquities within the parish are Rosslyn Chapel and the mansions of Hawthornden Castle and Melville Castle.

The parish includes the villages of Lasswade, Roslin and Rosewell, and the small town of Loanhead, plus part of the town of Bonnyrigg.

The Community Council areas for the parish are:

- Bonnyrigg/Lasswade
- Poltonhall and District
- Loanhead and District
- Roslin/Bilston
- Rosewell and District

A large part of the areas of Bonnyrigg/Lasswade and Poltonhall and District lies within Cockpen parish.

Lasswade parish. The yellow coloured areas were under the jurisdiction of police burghs (Loanhead, Bonnyrigg and Lasswade)

Lasswade is one of the most ancient Parishes in Scotland. Burial ground evidence shows that the church was active as early as the 9th century.

Before the Reformation, the present civil parish consisted of three parishes – Lasswade, Melville and Pentland – and the provostry of Roslin. Melville parish comprised the baronies of Melville and Lugton. In 1633, the barony of Melville which formed the greater part of the parish of Melville was united to Lasswade, and the barony of Lugton to Dalkeith. Pentland was erected into a parish before 1275. The parish of Pentland comprehended the baronies of Pentland and Falford (or Fulford) and the name Pentland appears in charters of the 12th century. In 13th and 14th centuries the northern Pentland Hills were called the Moor of Pentland, implying that the hills took the name from the parish or estate and not vice versa. The parish was suppressed in 1647, and the northern part annexed to Lasswade, while the southern, comprising the barony of Falford, was united to the new parish of St.Catherine's, now called Glencorse. However the churchyard of Pentland was still in use at least to 1907.

The parish of Lasswade was divided in two, ecclesiastically, when Roslin parish was erected in 1835. The Church in Rosewell was built 1871–72 and opened for worship 1874, when Rosewell became a separate ecclesiastical parish. It was re-united with Lasswade in 2008.

A Parochial Board was established under the Poor Law (Scotland) Act 1845. Within the parish of Lasswade, police burghs were created at Bonnyrigg, 1865 (main part in the parish of Cockpen); Lasswade, 1881; and Loanhead, 1884. Police burghs were communities over a certain size who were entitled to police many of their own affairs, such as cleansing, street lighting and water supply as well as public order. Police burghs were run by elected commissioners or magistrates. In 1901, police burgh functions were taken over by town or burgh councils.

With the Local Government (Scotland) Act 1894 the Parish Council was established, but this only administered the “landward” part of the parish, i.e. the burghs were excluded. Under the terms of the Local Government (Scotland) Act 1929, Bonnyrigg and Lasswade were united to become the burgh of Bonnyrigg and Lasswade. Burgh or town councils were abolished in 1975. The parish council ceased in 1930 when parish councils in Scotland were abolished, but civil parishes persist for census and other non-administrative purposes.

The civil parish has a population of 18,126 (in 2011) and an area of 10,678 acres.

== Famous residents ==
- Archibald Thorburn, wildlife artist
- Richard Baird Smith, a senior officer in the East India Company who partook in the Siege of Delhi. There is a monument to him near the Old Kirkyard.
- Pilkington Jackson, sculptor of the Robert the Bruce monument at Bannockburn
- Margaret Calderwood, diarist
- Professor Alexander Campbell Fraser, philosopher
- John Ivor Murray born here in 1824
- William McTaggart, painter
- John Notman (1810–1865), architect and landscape architect

== Notable persons interred in Lasswade ==
- Seven Viscounts Melville
- Charles Clough (geologist)
- Rev Walter Gregor
- Sir Robert Preston of Valleyfield
- Sir William Calderwood, Lord Polton
- William Drummond of Hawthornden, poet
