= Sir Robert Steuart, 1st Baronet =

Scottish merchant and politician

Sir Robert Steuart, Bt

Member of Parliament for North Berwick
- In office 1698–1702
- Preceded by: Sir Thomas Stewart
- Succeeded by: Sir Hew Dalrymple

Personal details
- Born: 1643 Edinburgh, Scotland
- Died: 1707 (aged 63–64)
- Spouse(s): Jean Gilmour; Jean Cockburn
- Children: Sir John Steuart, 2nd Baronet; Helen, Lady Elliot; Archibald Stewart
- Parent(s): Sir James Steuart; Anne Hope

Sir Robert Steuart (or Stewart), 1st Baronet of Allanbank (1643 – 1707) was a Scottish politician who represented North Berwick in the Parliament of Scotland from 1698 to 1702.

== Early life ==
Steuart was born in Edinburgh, Scotland in 1643. He was the seventh and youngest son of Sir James Steuart of Kirkfield and Coltness (1608–1681), Lord Provost of Edinburgh, by his first wife Anne Hope. He was a younger brother of Sir James Steuart of Goodtrees, the Lord Advocate from 1692 to 1709.

== Career ==
A merchant at Leith, he purchased the estate of Allanbank in Berwickshire. From 1698 to 1702, he represented North Berwick in the Parliament of Scotland.

=== Baronetcy ===
On 15 August 1687, he was created a Baronet of Nova Scotia, with remainder to his heirs male whatsoever. Upon his death in 1707, he was succeeded in his title by his first son from his first marriage, who became Sir John Steuart, 2nd Baronet.

== Personal life ==
He married firstly in 1682 to Jean Gilmour, daughter of Sir John Gilmour of Craigmillar, the Lord President of the Court of Session, and sister of Sir Alexander Gilmour, 1st Baronet. Together, Steuart and Gilmour had:

- Sir John Steuart, 2nd Baronet (c. 1685–1753)

His second wife, from 1692, was Helen Cockburn, daughter of Sir Alexander Cockburn of Langton. Their children included:

- Helen Steuart (1696–1774), who married Sir Gilbert Elliot, 2nd Baronet, of Minto
- Archibald Stewart (1697–1780), the Lord Provost of Edinburgh.

Sir Robert died in 1707. After his sons death in 1753, the title passed to his grandson, Sir John Steuart of Allanbank, 3rd baronet (1714–1796), then to his son, Sir John Steuart of Allanbank, 4th baronet (1754–1817), and lastly to Sir John James Steuart of Allanbank, 5th baronet (1779–1849).

== See also ==
- Pearlin Jean

Parliament of Scotland
Preceded by Sir Thomas Stewart	Burgh Commissioner for North Berwick; 1698 – 1702	Succeeded by Sir Hew Dalrymple
Baronetage of Nova Scotia
New creation	Baronet (of Allanbank); 1687–1707	Succeeded by John Steuart
