= James Steuart of Coltness =

Scottish merchant, banker, landowner, politician and Covenanter (1608–1681)

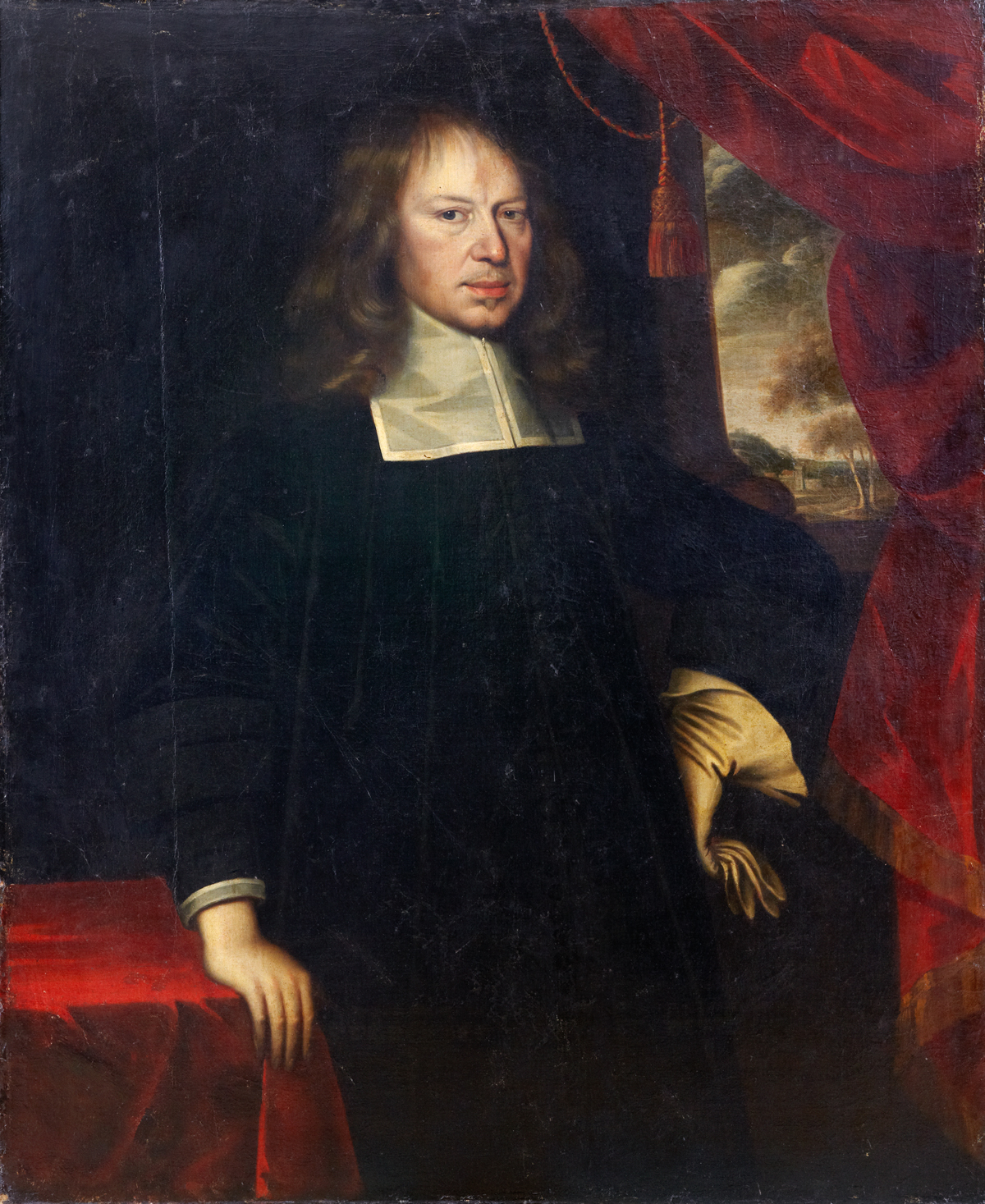
- Portrait of Steuart by David Scougall (c. 1658)

Lord Provost of Edinburgh
- In office 1658–1659
- Preceded by: Sir Andrew Ramsay, Lord Abbotshall
- Succeeded by: Robert Murray

Commissioner for Edinburgh
- In office 1649–1650
- Preceded by: Sir John Smyth
- Succeeded by: Samuel Desborrow

Lord Provost of Edinburgh
- In office 1648–1649
- Preceded by: Sir Archibald Tod
- Succeeded by: Sir Archibald Tod

Personal details
- Born: 1608
- Died: 31 March 1681 (aged 72–73)
- Spouses: Anne Hope (m. 1630; died 1646) Marion McCulloch Elliott (m. 1648)
- Children: Sir James Steuart; Sir Robert Steuart, Bt.
- Parent(s): James Steuart; Marion Carmichael
- Occupation: Merchant, banker, landowner, politician

Sir James Steuart of Coltness (1608 – 31 March 1681) was a Scottish merchant, banker, landowner, politician and Covenanter.

== Early life ==
Steuart was the second son of Marion Carmichael and James Steuart (1575–1607), of Allanton, Lanarkshire, and was born posthumously. Marion was sister of Sir James Carmichael, Justice General of Scotland.

== Career ==
He was a merchant and banker in Edinburgh, acquired a large fortune, then acquired the estates of Kirkfield (from Sir John Somerville of Cambusnethan) and Coldness (from Sir John Hamilton of Edston), both in Lanarkshire, in 1653.

He became a burgess of Edinburgh and guild member in 1631, apparently through his marriage to Thomas Hope's niece.

=== Public office ===
Steuart served as Provost of Edinburgh from 1648 to 1652, Commissioner for Edinburgh to the Parliament of Scotland from 1649 to 1650, and Lord Provost again in 1659. For a period of time, he was the Collector of Excise and Accountant-General for the Scottish Army.

His period of office as Provost included the decision to fortify the harbour of Leith and to create a new road between Edinburgh and Leith (later called Leith Walk.

=== Scottish Restoration ===
At the Restoration (1660) he was dismissed from public roles due to his being a Covenanter. After confinement in Edinburgh Castle, Steuart was sent to Dundee as a prisoner. He was granted a pardon in 1670.

== Personal life ==
In 1630, he married Anne Hope (d. 1646), daughter of Henry Hope and niece of Sir Thomas Hope of Craighall. Together, they had:

- Sir Thomas Steuart, 1st Baronet of Coltness (1631–1698)
- Sir James Steuart of Goodtrees (1635–1713)
- William Steuart (1640–1700)
- Sir Robert Steuart, 1st Baronet of Allanbank (1643–1707)
- Marion Steuart (1645–1706), who married John Maxwell (1648–1732)

In 1648, two years after Anne's death, Steuart married Marion McCulloch Elliott (d. 1690), widow of Sir John Elliott, and only daughter and heiress of David McCulloch, of Goodtrees.

Sir James Steuart died on 31 March 1681.

== See also ==
- Steuart baronets
