= David Calderwood =

Scottish minister of religion and historian (1575–1650)

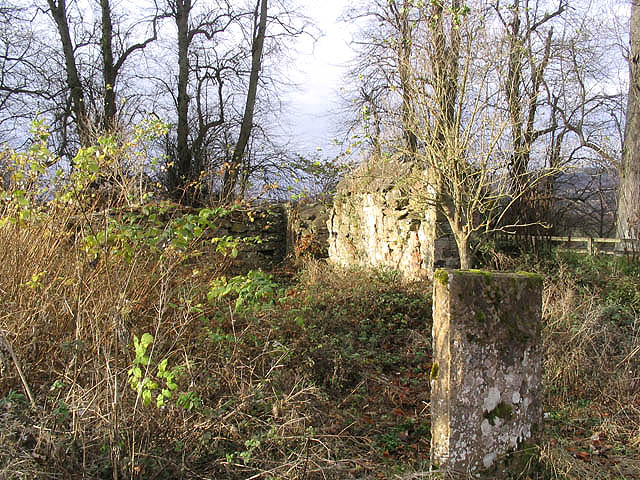
- The remains of Crailing Old Parish Church

Personal details
- Born: 1575 probably Dalkeith
- Died: 29 October 1650, age 75 Jedburgh
- Denomination: Church of Scotland
- Education: University of Edinburgh

David Calderwood (1575 – 29 October 1650) was a Scottish minister of religion and historian. Calderwood was banished for his nonconformity. He found a home in the Low Countries, where he wrote his great work, the Altare Damascenum which was an attack on Anglican episcopacy. He was present at the Glasgow Assembly in 1638, and saw episcopacy and the high church liturgy swept away from the Church of Scotland. He died at Jedburgh, a fugitive from his parish of Pencaitland; and buried in the churchyard of Crailing, where the first years of his ministry were spent.

== Royal conflict ==
David Calderwood was born at Dalkeith, Midlothian, and educated at the college of Edinburgh. In 1604 he was ordained minister of Crailing in Roxburghshire. It was the time when King James was attempting to introduce prelacy into the Church of Scotland, and Calderwood was one of the sturdiest opponents of the royal scheme. In 1608, when James Law, bishop of Orkney, came to Jedburgh, ordered a presbytery to be held, and set aside an election of members to the general assembly already made, in order to substitute other representatives more in favour of the king's views. Calderwood openly protested against the jurisdiction of the bishop, for which offence he was deprived of his right to attend church courts, and required to confine himself to the limits of his parish, Silenced in this way and prevented from taking any part in public proceedings, he applied himself the more earnestly to the authority. In 1617, when the king visited Scotland, an occasion occurred for a more open and important act of resistance. Some ministers were in the habit of meeting at that time in Edinburgh in an informal way, to discuss various matters; and when it was agreed by the lords of articles to pass a decree giving power to the king, with the archbishops, bishops, and such ministers as he might choose, to direct the external policy of the kirk, a number of the ministers met and signed a protest against the decree. Prominent among them was Calderwood. This led to his being summoned to the royal presence to give an account of his 'mutinous and seditious' deed. A singular colloquy took place between the king and the minister. The king had great confidence in his powers of argument and condescended to argue with Calderwood. Though on his knees, Calderwood replied to the king with great coolness and cleverness, baffling his royal opponent. The courtiers were shocked at his fearless style of reply, and some even of his own friends were tugging at him, to induce him to show more complaisance. Occasionally the king lost patience and scolded him as 'a false puritan' and 'a very knave.' The matter ended in Calderwood being deprived of his charge, confined first in the prison of St Andrews and then of Edinburgh, and finally ordered to leave the country.

== In Holland ==
Calderwood went to Holland, where he remained till the death of James in 1625. Here he had a severe attack of illness, and a rumour of his death was published along with a pretended recantation of his views, and an invitation to all to accept the "uniformity of the kirk". Proof was given that Calderwood was alive and in full vigour by the publication of a work entitled "Altare Damascenum", which, though appearing under the anagram of ‘Edwardus Didoclavius,’ was at once recognised as the production of Calderwood. ‘It was,’ says Thomson, in his life of Calderwood, prefixed to the Wodrow Society's edition of his history, ‘the great storehouse from which the prelatic arguments were subverted, and conversions to presbyterianism effected during the period of the second Scottish reformation. … It will only be from a correct translation of the "Altare Damascenum" that the public can derive a full idea of the eloquence, learning, and acute dialectic power of its author.’

== Return to Scotland ==
After Calderwood's return in 1625 to Scotland from Holland, he remained for some time without a charge. Powerful as a controversialist, he does not seem to have been either attractive as a speaker or of winning manner. It was not till 1640 that he obtained the charge of Pencaitland in East Lothian. He was employed, along with David Dickson and Alexander Henderson, in the drawing up of the Directory for Public Worship, which continued to be the recognised document for regulating the service in the Church of Scotland. But the great work of Calderwood was the compilation of his History of the Kirk of Scotland. When he had reached his seventy-third year, the general assembly, for the purpose of enabling him to perfect his work, granted him an annual pension of eight hundred pounds Scots. The history which he compiled was thrown into three different forms. The first and largest extended to 3,136 pages; less than a half of this work is now among the manuscripts of the British Museum. The second was a digest of the first, ‘in better order and wanting nothing of the substance;’ this was published by the Wodrow Society in 8 vols. 8vo, 1842–9. The third, another abbreviation, was first published in a folio volume in 1678, twenty-eight years after his death. Though little attractive in a literary sense, Calderwood's history is the great quarry for information on the ecclesiastical history of Scotland "beginning at Mr. Patrick Hamilton, and ending with the death of James the Sixth".

== Family ==
Calderwood does not appear ever to have been married. His papers were bequeathed to a brother's family, a member of which, William Calderwood, Lord Polton, presented the manuscripts of his history to the British Museum on 29 January 1765. Other collections of papers were given to Wodrow, in whose possession they were at the time of his death; these papers were purchased by the Faculty of Advocates in 1792.

== Works ==
The following list of Calderwood's published writings is extracted from the life prefixed to the Wodrow Society's edition of his history, having been inserted there "from the appendix to the Life of Henderson in the miscellaneous writings of Dr. McCrie":

- ‘Perth Assembly,’ 1619.
- ‘Parasynagma Perthense,’ 1620.
- ‘Defence of our Arguments against kneeling in the act of receiving the sacramental elements of bread and wine, impugned by Mr. Michelsone,’ 1620.
- ‘A Dialogue betwixt Cosmophilus and Theophilus anent the urging of new Ceremonies upon the Kirk of Scotland,’ 1620.
- ‘The Speech of the Kirk of Scotland to her beloved children,’ 1620.
- ‘The Solution of Dr. Resolutus, his Resolutions.’
- ‘The Altar of Damascus,’ 1621.
- ‘The Course of Conformitie,’ 1622.
- ‘Altare Damascenum: seu Ecclesiæ Anglicanæ Politia,’ 1623 (the Latin work is much fuller than the English).
- ‘A Reply to Dr. Morton's general Defence of Three Nocent Ceremonies,’ 1623.
- ‘A Reply to Dr. Morton's particular Defence of Three Nocent Ceremonies,’ 1623.
- ‘An Exhortation of the particular Kirks of Christ in Scotland to their sister Kirk in Edinburgh,’ 1624.
- ‘An Epistle of a Christian Brother,’ 1624.
- ‘A Dispute upon Communicating at our confused Communions,’ 1624.
- ‘The Pastor and the Prelate,’ 1628.
- ‘A Re-examination of the Five Articles enacted at Perth,’ 1636.
- ‘The Re-examination abridged,’ 1636.
- ‘An Answer to Mr. J. Forbes of Corse, his Peaceable Warning,’ 1638.

== Bibliography ==
- Life of David Calderwood, by Rev. Thomas Thomson, F.S.A. Scot., in Wodrow edition of his History 1849
- Preface to vol. viii. of History, with genealogical table and notices of the family of Calderwood, by David Laing, 1849
- Letters and Journals of Robert Baillie, A.M., edited by David Laing, 1842
- Correspondence of the Rev. Robert Wodrow, 1843
- Grub's Ecclesiastical History of Scotland, vols. ii. and iii. 1861
- Walker's Scottish Theology and Theologians, 1872. Walker says of the Altare Damascenum: ‘The Bible, the Fathers, the Canonists, are equally at his command. It does our church no credit that the Altare has never been translated. It seems to have been more in request out of Scotland than in it. … Among the Dutch divines he was ever Eminentissimus Calderwood.’

== EB summary ==
Calderwood was educated at Edinburgh, where he took the degree of MA in 1593. In about 1604, he became minister of Crailing, near Jedburgh in Roxburghshire, where he became conspicuous for his resolute opposition to the introduction of Episcopacy. In 1617, while James VI was in Scotland, a Remonstrance, which had been drawn up by the Presbyterian clergy, was placed in Calderwood's hands.

He was summoned to St Andrews and examined before the king, but neither threats nor promises could make him deliver up the roll of signatures to the Remonstrance. He was deprived of his charge, committed to prison at St Andrews and afterwards removed to Edinburgh. The privy council ordered him to be banished from the kingdom for refusing to acknowledge the sentence of the High Commission. He lingered in Scotland, publishing a few tracts, till 27 August 1619, when he sailed for Holland. During his residence in Holland he published his Altare Damascenum. Calderwood appears to have returned to Scotland in 1624-1625. He was appointed minister of Pencaitland in East Lothian, in about 1640, where he was one of those appointed to draw up the Directory for Public Worship.

He continued to take an active part in the affairs of the church, and introduced in 1649 the practice, now confirmed by long usage, of dissenting from the decision of the General Assembly, and requiring the protest to be entered in the record. His last years were devoted to the preparation of The Historie of the Kirk of Scotland which was published in an abridged form in 1646. The complete work was printed (1842–49) for the Wodrow Society. In 1648 the General Assembly urged him to complete the work he had designed, and voted him a yearly pension of £800.

Calderwood died at Jedburgh on 29 October 1650. He left behind him a historical work of great extent and of great value as a storehouse of authentic materials. An abridgment, which appears to have been prepared by Calderwood himself, was published after his death. An excellent edition of the complete work was published by the Wodrow Society, 8 vols, 1842-1849. The manuscript, which belonged to Calderwood Durham, was presented to the British Museum.
