= Thomas Kennedy (Scottish judge) =

Scottish lawyer, judge and Tory politician

Thomas Kennedy (1673 – 19 May 1754) was a Scottish lawyer from Dunure, Ayrshire, and a Tory politician. He sat in the House of Commons of Great Britain from 1720 to 1721, and then became a judge of the Scottish Court of Exchequer.

== Early life and family ==
He was the oldest son of Sir Thomas Kennedy of Kirkhill and Dunure (Lord Provost of Edinburgh from 1685 to 1687) and Agnes Halden. He was educated at the University of Edinburgh and at Utrecht University, and was admitted as an advocate in 1698.

In 1714 he married Grizel Kynynmont, daughter of Patrick Kynynmont of Kynynmont, Fife, and widow of Sir Alexander Murray, 1st Baronet, of Melgund, Forfar. They had no children.

== Career ==
Kennedy was joint Solicitor General for Scotland from 1709 to 1714, sharing the office with Sir James Stewart, 1st Baronet. He was appointed as Lord Advocate in March 1714, but he was dismissed in October 1714 after George I succeeded to the throne. He later supported the 2nd Duke of Argyll, who organised his return at a by-election in January 1720 as Member of Parliament (MP) for Ayr Burghs.

He ended his parliamentary career a year later, when he was appointed as a judge of the Scottish Court of Exchequer.

Parliament of Great Britain
Preceded by Charles Oliphant	Member of Parliament for Ayr Burghs; 1720–1721	Succeeded by Duncan Forbes
Legal offices
Preceded by William Carmichael	Solicitor General for Scotland; 1709–1714; With: Sir James Stewart, Bt	Succeeded by John Carnegie of Boyseck
Preceded by Sir James Stewart	Lord Advocate; 1714	Succeeded by Sir David Dalrymple, Bt
