= James Stewart (advocate, born 1635) =

Scottish lawyer and advocate

Sir James Stewart
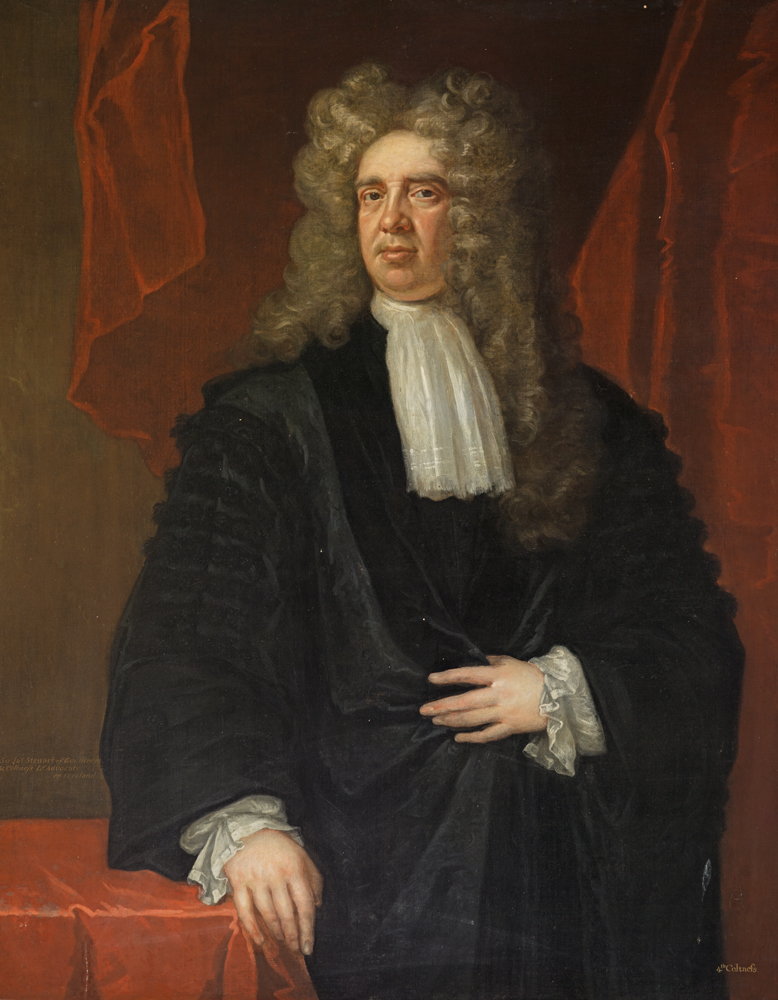
- Portrait of Sir James by John Baptist Medina

Lord Advocate
- In office 1711–1713
- Preceded by: David Dalrymple, 1st Baronet
- Succeeded by: Thomas Kennedy of Dunure
- In office 1692–1707
- Preceded by: John Dalrymple, Earl of Stair
- Succeeded by: David Dalrymple, 1st Baronet

Personal details
- Born: 1635
- Died: 1713 (aged 77–78)
- Spouse: Agnes Traill
- Children: Sir James Stewart, 1st Baronet; Ann Stewart
- Parent(s): Sir James Steuart; Anne Hope
- Relatives: Sir Robert Steuart, 1st Baronet (brother); William Mure (son-in-law); Sir James Steuart-Denham (grandson); William Mure (grandson)

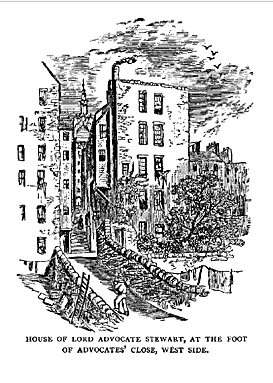
The Lord Advocates house at the foot of Advocates Close

Sir James Stewart (or Steuart) of Goodtrees (1635–1713) was a Scottish lawyer, political opponent of the Stuarts monarchy, and reforming Lord Advocate from 1692 to 1713. The Jacobites nicknamed him Jamie Wylie.

== Early life ==
James Stewart was the fourth son of Sir James Steuart of Coltness (1608–1681), a banker in Edinburgh and Lord Provost of Edinburgh, and Anne Hope, niece of Sir Thomas Hope.

He was the brother of Sir Robert Steuart, 1st Baronet of Allanbank (1643–1707) and Sir Thomas Stewart of Coltness, 1st Baronet.

== Career ==
He was called to the bar on 20 November 1661, but lost almost all his practice defending his father against a charge of embezzlement.

=== In exile ===
Stewart found it necessary to leave the country because of a pamphlet, and went to Rouen, where he became a merchant under the name of Graham. Some years afterwards he returned to Scotland, but he was suspected of having had a hand in a further political pamphlet, An Account of Scotlands Grievances by reason of the Duke of Lauderdale's Ministry (1675), an order was issued for his apprehension. He escaped, and lay in England under the name of Lawson.

In 1678, Stewart opened a small office in London, where he gave legal advice at half fees, his clerk meeting the clients and transmitting their statements to the invisible Stewart. Returning to Scotland in 1679, he again got into trouble in 1681, when among the papers of Archibald Campbell, 9th Earl of Argyll a memorandum in his hand was found, reflecting on the government. He took refuge in The Hague. He was present at the meeting at Amsterdam in 1685, when the expedition of Argyll was resolved on.

Stewart having prepared Argyll's declaration of war, he was accused of treasonably consulting and contriving Argyll's rebellion, He was found guilty in his absence. His sentence was to be executed whenever he could be found.

=== Later life ===
Stewart was pardoned by James II of Great Britain in 1687, and returned to London. His actions have been interpreted as those of a double agent. On account of his supposed influence with the presbyterian party, he was received into favour, and employed to conduct crown cases along with George Mackenzie.

In 1692, after the Glorious Revolution, Stewart was appointed Lord Advocate, and during his term of office introduced legal reforms in Scotland. He was elected Dean of the Faculty of Advocates until 1695. In December 1696 Stewart was the prosecutor in the last execution for blasphemy in the United Kingdom with the case of Thomas Aikenhead. Stewart demanded the death penalty to set an example to others who might otherwise express such opinions in the future. He resigned his position as Lord Advocate in 1709. He died in 1715 in his house at the foot of what is now Advocates Close, and was buried in Greyfriars Kirkyard.

Stewart is the advocate who gives his name to Advocates Close.

== Works ==
An anonymous work Naphthali, or, The Wrestlings of the Church of Scotland (1667) is now attributed to Stewart and the Covenanter minister James Stirling, with Stewart supplying the legal portion. It defended the Pentland Rising of 1666, in the context of the repression of the Presbyterians since 1660. In 1669 Stewart published a political pamphlet Jus Populi Vindicatum, or the People's Right to defend themselves, and their Covenanted Reign vindicated, as a reply to Andrew Honeyman's Survey of Naphtali (1668).

== Family ==
He was married to Agnes Traill (1646-1690), daughter of Rev. Robert Traill. Anne was the widow of James Maxwell of Blawarthill. Among Stewart's children, among which he had only one son, were:

- Sir James Stewart, 1st Baronet (1681–1727), the solicitor-general, who married Anne Dalrymple, daughter of the Lord North Berwick, the Lord President of the Court of Session
- Anne Stewart, who married William Mure of Caldwell.

=== Descendants ===
His grandson was Sir James Steuart-Denham 3rd Baronet of Goodtrees and 7th Baronet of Coltness, (1713–1780) the elder Sir James Steuart-Denham. Another grandson was William Mure (1718–1776), a Member of Parliament from Renfrewshire.

== In fiction ==
Sir James Stewart features as a character in Heather Richardson's novel, Doubting Thomas (2017)

== Notes ==
Notes

This article incorporates text from a publication now in the public domain: Lee, Sidney, ed. (1898). "Steuart, James". Dictionary of National Biography. Vol. 54. London: Smith, Elder & Co.
