= Denham baronets =

Extinct baronetcy in the Baronetage of Nova Scotia

The Denham of Westshield Baronetcy (after the family estate of Westshield in Lanark) was created on 31 January 1693 in the Baronetage of Nova Scotia for William Denham.

== Family ==
The Denham baronetcy was created for Sir William Denham, Master of the Mint for Scotland; he had purchased the estate of Westshield from the Earl of Carnwath. He had no children, and the patent of the baronetcy permitted him to assign the baronetcy, in default of natural heirs. In 1711, he entailed his property and title to the children of his sisters, as follows.

- Sir William Denham of Westshield (1630 – 1 January 1712), 1st Baronet, Master of the Mint for Scotland, cr. 1693. with special remainder to his assignees, failing the heirs of his body. Entail of his title and estate 1711, died without children 1 January 1712.
- Grizel Baillie, elder sister.
  - Sir Robert Denham, formerly Baillie (died before October 1737) 2nd Baronet, per entail
    - Sir Alexander Denham (died before January 1749), de jure 3rd Baronet.
    - Sir Robert Denham (died 29 September 1756) 4th Baronet
- Susan Lockhart, later Susan Steuart, younger sister, 2nd wife of Sir Thomas Steuart, 1st Baronet, of Coltness
  - Sir Archibald Steuart Denham, (20 July 1683 – 12 June 1773), 5th Baronet, also 6th Baronet of Coltness; son by second marriage.
  - William Lockhart of Waygateshaw; son by first marriage
    - Sir William Lockhart Denham (died 24 June 1776) 6th Baronet, died without children.

With the death of the sixth baronet, the entail expired, since nobody was left with a claim under it. At this point, the baronetcy presumably became extinct, since the first baronet's assignment was exhausted; Sir William Lockhart Denham was free to bequeath his property, and left the Westshields estate to Sir James Steuart, 3rd & 7th Baronet (of Goodtrees and Coltness), who then adopted the name of Denham.

== See also ==
- Steuart baronets
