= William Calderwood, Lord Polton =

Scottish lord of session

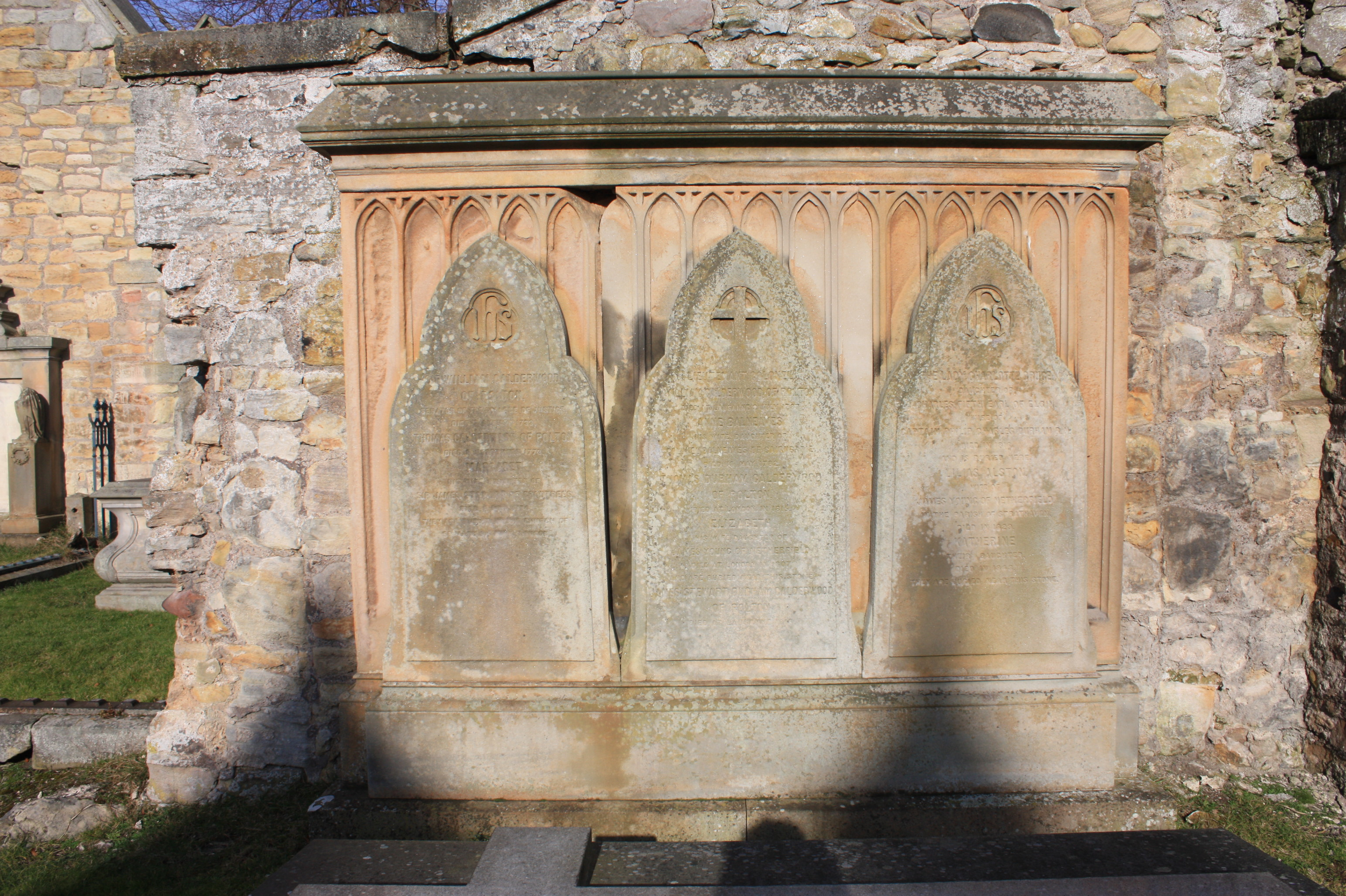
The grave of William Calderwood and family, Old Kirkyard, Lasswade

Sir William Calderwood, Lord Polton (1660?–1733) was a Scottish lord of session.

== Life ==
He was the son of Alexander Calderwood, baillie of Dalkeith, and was admitted advocate at the Scottish bar in July 1687. After the Glorious Revolution he was made deputy-sheriff of the county of Edinburgh, and some time before 1707 received the honour of knighthood. He was appointed to succeed Sir William Anstruther of Anstruther as an ordinary lord in 1711, under the title of Lord Polton. He was at the same time nominated a lord of justiciary.

Calderwood died on 7 August 1733, in his seventy-third year. He is buried in the Old Kirkyard of Lasswade on the outer south side of the Dundas Vault.

In 1723 Rev Robert Stark (1697–1766) began a period as chaplain to Calderwood's family prior to being ordained at Torryburn in 1725.

== Notes ==
Attribution

This article incorporates text from a publication now in the public domain: Stephen, Leslie, ed. (1886). "Calderwood, William". Dictionary of National Biography. Vol. 8. London: Smith, Elder & Co.
