= Allanbank, Scottish Borders =

Village in Scottish Borders, Scotland

Coordinates: 55.78425°N 2.2337°W

Allanbank is a village near Allanton, in the Scottish Borders area of Scotland, in the historic county of Berwickshire.

Allanbank Chapel was dedicated to St. Mary and was located in a small field named Chapel Haugh. Nearby places include Blackadder Water, Duns, Earlston, Edrom, Gavinton, Kelloe, Kimmerghame House, and the Whiteadder Water.

== See also ==
- Pearlin Jean
- List of places in the Scottish Borders
