= 1730 in Scotland =

- Centuries: 16th; 17th; 18th; 19th; 20th
- Decades: 1710s; 1720s; 1730s; 1740s; 1750s
- See also: List of years in Scotland; Timeline of Scottish history 1730 in: Great Britain • Wales • Elsewhere

Events from the year 1730 in Scotland.

== Incumbents ==
- Secretary of State for Scotland: vacant

=== Law officers ===
- Lord Advocate – Duncan Forbes
- Solicitor General for Scotland – John Sinclair, jointly with Charles Erskine

=== Judiciary ===
- Lord President of the Court of Session – Lord North Berwick
- Lord Justice General – Lord Ilay
- Lord Justice Clerk – Lord Grange

== Events ==
- 12 March – John Glas deposed from the Church of Scotland; the Glasite sect forms around him.
- The Glasgow Linen Society is formed.
- Francis Hutcheson takes office as Professor of Moral Philosophy in the University of Glasgow, where he will lecture in English rather than Latin.
- Iron smelting at Abernethy using ore from Tomintoul.
- Perth–Dunkeld–Inverness road completed.
- Lebanon cedar tree introduced to Scotland.

== Births ==
- 14 December – James Bruce, explorer of the Nile (died 1794)
- James Christie, auctioneer (died 1803 in England)
- John Murray, 4th Earl of Dunmore, governor of the Province of New York (died 1809 in England)
- Probable year – Charlotte Lennox, novelist and poet (born in Gibraltar; died 1804 in England)

== Deaths ==
- 25 December – Henry Scott, 1st Earl of Deloraine, army officer (born 1676)
- James Johnstone, 2nd Marquess of Annandale, art collector (born c. 1687/8; died in Italy)

== The arts ==
- James Thomson's poem cycle The Seasons is first published complete.

== See also ==
- Timeline of Scottish history
