= 1728 in Scotland =

- Centuries: 16th; 17th; 18th; 19th; 20th
- Decades: 1700s; 1710s; 1720s; 1730s; 1740s
- See also: List of years in Scotland; Timeline of Scottish history 1728 in: Great Britain • Wales • Elsewhere

Events from the year 1728 in Scotland.

== Incumbents ==
- Secretary of State for Scotland: vacant

=== Law officers ===
- Lord Advocate – Duncan Forbes
- Solicitor General for Scotland – John Sinclair, jointly with Charles Erskine

=== Judiciary ===
- Lord President of the Court of Session – Lord North Berwick
- Lord Justice General – Lord Ilay
- Lord Justice Clerk – Lord Grange

== Events ==
- 13 May – 3 men and 8 boys from Hirta are retrieved from Stac an Armin where they have been accidentally marooned for about 9 months, the longest recorded period anyone has spent on the sea stack.
- 31 May – The Royal Bank of Scotland extends the first overdraft (to Edinburgh merchant William Hogg for £1,000).
- Iron smelting at Invergarry begins.
- Inverness – Fort William road through the Great Glen completed.
- First larch trees in Scotland planted at Dunkeld.
- First publication of Robert Lindsay of Pitscottie's The Historie and Chronicles of Scotland, 1436–1565, written about 1575 in the Scots language.

== Births ==
- 13 February – John Hunter, surgeon (died 1793)
- 16 April – Joseph Black, physicist and chemist (born in France; died 1799)
- 3 July – Robert Adam, architect (died 1792)

== Deaths ==
- 3 April – James Anderson, lawyer, antiquary and historian (born 1662)

== See also ==
- Timeline of Scottish history
