= 1727 in Scotland =

- Centuries: 16th; 17th; 18th; 19th; 20th
- Decades: 1700s; 1710s; 1720s; 1730s; 1740s
- See also: List of years in Scotland; Timeline of Scottish history 1727 in: Great Britain • Wales • Elsewhere

Events from the year 1727 in Scotland.

== Incumbents ==
- Secretary of State for Scotland: vacant

=== Law officers ===
- Lord Advocate – Duncan Forbes
- Solicitor General for Scotland – John Sinclair, jointly with Charles Erskine

=== Judiciary ===
- Lord President of the Court of Session – Lord North Berwick
- Lord Justice General – Lord Ilay
- Lord Justice Clerk – Lord Grange

== Events ==
- 31 May – the Royal Bank of Scotland is founded by Royal Charter in Edinburgh. Co-founder Lord Ilay is its first governor.
- Board of Trustees for Fisheries, Manufactures and Improvements in Scotland established.
- An old woman known as Janet (Jenny) Horne of Loth, Sutherland, becomes the last alleged witch in the British Isles to be executed when she is burned at the stake in Dornoch. (Some sources give the date as June 1722.)
- Outbreak of smallpox on Hirta.
- The first Palladian villa in Scotland, Mavisbank House, designed by William Adam in collaboration with his client, Sir John Clerk of Penicuik, is completed.

== Births ==
- 7 September – William Smith, Episcopalian priest and theologian, first provost of the University of Pennsylvania, poet and historian (died 1803 in the United States)
- Niel Gow, fiddler (died 1807)

== Deaths ==
- Elizabeth, Lady Wardlaw, ballad writer (born 1677)

== See also ==
- Timeline of Scottish history
