= 1729 in Scotland =

- Centuries: 16th; 17th; 18th; 19th; 20th
- Decades: 1700s; 1710s; 1720s; 1730s; 1740s
- See also: List of years in Scotland; Timeline of Scottish history 1729 in: Great Britain • Wales • Elsewhere

Events from the year 1729 in Scotland.

== Incumbents ==
- Secretary of State for Scotland: vacant

=== Law officers ===
- Lord Advocate – Duncan Forbes
- Solicitor General for Scotland – John Sinclair, jointly with Charles Erskine

=== Judiciary ===
- Lord President of the Court of Session – Lord North Berwick
- Lord Justice General – Lord Ilay
- Lord Justice Clerk – Lord Grange

== Events ==
- 8 January – two women arrested in Edinburgh for wearing men's clothing.
- 6 August – Royal Infirmary of Edinburgh established as the "Hospital for the Sick Poor" or "Physicians' Hospital" in Edinburgh.
- Mackintosh of Borlum publishes An essay on ways and means for inclosing, fallowing, planting, &c. Scotland; and that in sixteen years at farthest, "by a lover of his country", in Edinburgh.

== Births ==
- October – Sir William Pulteney, 5th Baronet, born William Johnstone, advocate, landowner and politician (died 1805 in London)
- William Buchan, physician (died 1805 in London)
- John Moore, physician and writer (died 1802 in London)

== Deaths ==
- 21 March – John Law, economist (born 1671; died in Venice)
- 13 September – Colen Campbell, architect (born 1676; died in London)
- Gershom Carmichael, philosopher (born c. 1672)
- Sìleas na Ceapaich, Gaelic poet (born c. 1660)

== The arts ==
- Society of St. Luke, Scotland's first art institute, established in Edinburgh.

== See also ==
- Timeline of Scottish history
