= 1732 in Scotland =

- Centuries: 16th; 17th; 18th; 19th; 20th
- Decades: 1710s; 1720s; 1730s; 1740s; 1750s
- See also: List of years in Scotland; Timeline of Scottish history 1732 in: Great Britain • Wales • Elsewhere

Events from the year 1732 in Scotland.

== Incumbents ==
- Secretary of State for Scotland: vacant

=== Law officers ===
- Lord Advocate – Duncan Forbes
- Solicitor General for Scotland – John Sinclair, jointly with Charles Erskine

=== Judiciary ===
- Lord President of the Court of Session – Lord North Berwick
- Lord Justice General – Lord Ilay
- Lord Justice Clerk – Lord Grange

== Events ==
- This year's General Assembly of the Church of Scotland gives rise to the First Secession of 1733.
- Construction of a new Haddo House near Tarves in Aberdeenshire for William Gordon, 2nd Earl of Aberdeen, by William Adam in Georgian Palladian style begins.

== Births ==
- 21 February – William Falconer, poet (lost at sea c.1770)
- 21 July – James Adam, architect (died 1794 in England)
- 6 October – John Broadwood, piano maker (died 1812 in England)

== Deaths ==
- 20 May – Thomas Boston, church leader (born 1676)

== See also ==
- Timeline of Scottish history
