= 1731 in Scotland =

- Centuries: 16th; 17th; 18th; 19th; 20th
- Decades: 1710s; 1720s; 1730s; 1740s; 1750s
- See also: List of years in Scotland; Timeline of Scottish history 1731 in: Great Britain • Wales • Elsewhere

Events from the year 1731 in Scotland.

== Incumbents ==
- Secretary of State for Scotland: vacant

=== Law officers ===
- Lord Advocate – Duncan Forbes
- Solicitor General for Scotland – John Sinclair, jointly with Charles Erskine

=== Judiciary ===
- Lord President of the Court of Session – Lord North Berwick
- Lord Justice General – Lord Ilay
- Lord Justice Clerk – Lord Grange

== Events ==
- Cumbernauld House, to designs by William Adam, is built.
- Publication in Edinburgh of The Poor Man's Physician, or The receipts of the famous John Moncrief of Tippermalloch; being a choice collection of simple and easy remedies for most distempers, very useful for all persons, especially those of a poorer condition ... To which is added The method of curing the small pox and scurvy, by the eminent Dr. Archibald Pitcairn (3rd edition).

== Births ==
- 1 July – Adam Duncan, admiral, victor of the Battle of Camperdown (died 1804 in Northumberland)
- date unknown – William Aiton, botanist (died 1793)

== Deaths ==
- 28 April – Robert Gordon, merchant and philanthropist (born 1668)
- 6 November – James Smith, architect (b. c.1645)

== See also ==
- Timeline of Scottish history
