= 1737 in Scotland =

- Centuries: 16th; 17th; 18th; 19th; 20th
- Decades: 1710s; 1720s; 1730s; 1740s; 1750s
- See also: List of years in Scotland; Timeline of Scottish history 1737 in: Great Britain • Wales • Elsewhere

Events from the year 1737 in Scotland.

== Incumbents ==
- Secretary of State for Scotland: vacant

=== Law officers ===
- Lord Advocate – Duncan Forbes, then Charles Erskine
- Solicitor General for Scotland – Charles Erskine, then William Grant of Prestongrange

=== Judiciary ===
- Lord President of the Court of Session – Lord North Berwick until 20 June; then Lord Culloden
- Lord Justice General – Lord Ilay
- Lord Justice Clerk – Lord Milton

== Events ==
- The Lord Provost of Edinburgh is debarred from office following the previous year's Porteous Riots.
- Aberdeen Royal Infirmary founded as Woolmanhill Hospital.
- Royal Society of Edinburgh formed as the Edinburgh Society for Improving Arts and Sciences and particularly Natural Knowledge.
- Kilmichael Bridge in Argyll built.
- Construction of a new Glasgow town hall begins.
- Andrew Rodger, a farmer on the estate of Cavers, south Roxburghshire, develops a winnowing machine for corn, called a 'fanner'.

== Births ==
- 25 March (bapt.) – William Forsyth, horticulturist (died 1804 in London)
- 17 July – John Bowes, 9th Earl of Strathmore and Kinghorne, born John Lyon (died 1776 at sea)
- 29 August – John Hunter, Royal Navy officer and governor of New South Wales (died 1821 in London)
- 14 September – Alexander Geddes, Catholic theologian and scholar (died 1802 in London)
- James Clark, physician and plantation owner in Dominica (died 1819 in London)
- John Donaldson, miniature painter (died 1801 in London)

== Deaths ==
- 29 January – George Hamilton, 1st Earl of Orkney, soldier (born 1666; died in London)
- 1 February – Hew Dalrymple, Lord North Berwick, judge and politician (born 1652)

== The arts ==
- Allan Ramsay co-writes and edits the last volume of The Tea-Table Miscellany, a collection of Scots songs.

== See also ==
- Timeline of Scottish history
