= 1733 in Scotland =

- Centuries: 16th; 17th; 18th; 19th; 20th
- Decades: 1710s; 1720s; 1730s; 1740s; 1750s
- See also: List of years in Scotland; Timeline of Scottish history 1733 in: Great Britain • Wales • Elsewhere

Events from the year 1733 in Scotland.

== Incumbents ==
- Secretary of State for Scotland: vacant

=== Law officers ===
- Lord Advocate – Duncan Forbes
- Solicitor General for Scotland – Charles Erskine

=== Judiciary ===
- Lord President of the Court of Session – Lord North Berwick
- Lord Justice General – Lord Ilay
- Lord Justice Clerk – Lord Grange

== Events ==
- 23 April–end of October – Wade's Bridge, Aberfeldy, designed by William Adam, built.
- May–December – First Secession from the Church of Scotland.

== Births ==
- 4 January – Robert Mylne, architect (died 1811 in London)
- 3 February – Alexander Wedderburn, 1st Earl of Rosslyn, Lord Chancellor of Great Britain (died 1805 in England)
- 1 May – Archibald McLean, Baptist minister (died 1812)
- 22 May – Alexander Monro, anatomist (died 1817)
- 24 December – Thomas Bell, theologian (died 1802)
- John Forbes, general in Portuguese service (died 1808 in Brazil)
- Lewis Hutchinson, serial killer (hanged 1773 in Jamaica)

== Deaths ==
- January – Alexander Duncan, Episcopal Bishop of Glasgow (born c. 1655)
- 27 January – Patrick Vanse, Member of Parliament (born c. 1655)
- 31 October – David Boyle, 1st Earl of Glasgow, politician (born c. 1666)
- 29 December – Sir Robert Grierson, 1st Baronet (born 1655/6)

== The arts ==
- William Thomson publishes Orpheus caledonius: or, A collection of Scots songs.

== See also ==
- Timeline of Scottish history
