= 1735 in Scotland =

- Centuries: 16th; 17th; 18th; 19th; 20th
- Decades: 1710s; 1720s; 1730s; 1740s; 1750s
- See also: List of years in Scotland; Timeline of Scottish history 1735 in: Great Britain • Wales • Elsewhere

Events from the year 1735 in Scotland.

== Incumbents ==
- Secretary of State for Scotland: vacant

=== Law officers ===
- Lord Advocate – Duncan Forbes
- Solicitor General for Scotland – Charles Erskine

=== Judiciary ===
- Lord President of the Court of Session – Lord North Berwick
- Lord Justice General – Lord Ilay
- Lord Justice Clerk – Lord Grange, then Lord Milton

== Events ==
- 8 August – Wade's Bridge, Aberfeldy, built and opened in 1733, is formally opened in the presence of General George Wade.

== Births ==
- 22 January – Robert Aitken, printer and publisher in Philadelphia, first to publish an English language Bible in the U.S. (died 1802 in the United States)
- 17 May (bapt.) – John Brown, physician (died 1788 in London)
- 20 September – James Keir, geologist, chemist and industrialist (died 1820 in West Bromwich)
- 25 October – James Beattie, poet and moralist (died 1803)
- 14 November – John Howie, biographer (died 1793)
- James Tassie, portrait engraver (died 1799 in London)

== Deaths ==
- 27 February – John Arbuthnot, satirist and polymath (born 1667; died in London)

== See also ==
- Timeline of Scottish history
