= 1734 in Scotland =

- Centuries: 16th; 17th; 18th; 19th; 20th
- Decades: 1710s; 1720s; 1730s; 1740s; 1750s
- See also: List of years in Scotland; Timeline of Scottish history 1734 in: Great Britain • Wales • Elsewhere

Events from the year 1734 in Scotland.

== Incumbents ==
- Secretary of State for Scotland: vacant

=== Law officers ===
- Lord Advocate – Duncan Forbes
- Solicitor General for Scotland – Charles Erskine

=== Judiciary ===
- Lord President of the Court of Session – Lord North Berwick
- Lord Justice General – Lord Ilay
- Lord Justice Clerk – Lord Grange

== Events ==
- 8 April – 6 August: Siege of Gaeta in the Kingdom of Naples (War of the Polish Succession) at which Charles Edward Stuart is present, his only military experience prior to the Jacobite rising of 1745.

== Births ==
- 28 April – John Johnstone, nabob with the East India Company and landowner (died 1795)
- 7 May – James Byres, architect and antiquary (died 1817)
- 29 September – William Julius Mickle, poet (died 1788)
- 7 October – Ralph Abercromby, British Army general and politician (died 1801 of wounds received at Battle of Alexandria)
- 15 December – John Maclaurin, judge and poet (died 1796)

== Deaths ==
- 21 March – Robert Wodrow, historian (born 1679)
- May – Alexander McGill, architect (born c. 1680)
- 28 December – Rob Roy MacGregor, clan chief (born 1671)

== See also ==
- Timeline of Scottish history
