= 1736 in Scotland =

- Centuries: 16th; 17th; 18th; 19th; 20th
- Decades: 1710s; 1720s; 1730s; 1740s; 1750s
- See also: List of years in Scotland; Timeline of Scottish history 1736 in: Great Britain • Wales • Elsewhere

Events from the year 1736 in Scotland.

== Incumbents ==
- Secretary of State for Scotland: vacant

=== Law officers ===
- Lord Advocate – Duncan Forbes
- Solicitor General for Scotland – Charles Erskine

=== Judiciary ===
- Lord President of the Court of Session – Lord North Berwick
- Lord Justice General – Lord Ilay
- Lord Justice Clerk – Lord Milton

== Events ==
- 10 January – emigrants from the Scottish Highlands arrive in North America on the Prince of Wales to establish the defensive town of Darien, Georgia, originally called New Inverness, among them being Lachlan McGillivray, Lachlan McIntosh and other members of the Clan Mackintosh.
- 14 April – Porteous Riots in Edinburgh. John Porteous, captain of the city guard, orders his men to fire into the crowd, causing six deaths.
- 5 July – Captain Porteous found guilty of murder by the High Court of Justiciary.
- 7 September – the Edinburgh mob drags Captain Porteous out of his cell in Tolbooth prison and lynches him, beats him and hangs him to death.
- George Hamilton, 1st Earl of Orkney, becomes the first Field Marshal of Great Britain.
- Royal Infirmary of Edinburgh receives its royal charter.
- Grand Lodge of Scotland founded within Freemasonry in Scotland.
- Publication in Glasgow of John M'Ure's Glasghu facies: a view of the city of Glasgow; or, An account of its origin..., the first comprehensive history of the city.
- Approximate date – Scots Mining Company House built at Leadhills.

== Births ==
- 19 January – James Watt, inventor (died 1819 in England)
- 11 May – Alexander Murray, Lord Henderland, judge and politician (died 1795)
- 15 August – Alexander Runciman, painter of historical and mythological subjects (died 1785)
- 27 October – James Macpherson, poet, "translator" of Ossian (died 1796)
- 8 November – Lady Mary Hamilton, née Leslie, novelist (died 1821 in London)
- 18 November – George Fordyce, physician (died 1802 in London)
- William Ogilvie of Pittensear, land reformer (died 1819)

== Deaths ==
- 7 September – John Porteous, captain of the guard (born c. 1695)

== The arts ==
- 8 November – poet Allan Ramsay establishes the first regular public theatre company in Scotland, at Carrubber's Close in Edinburgh.

== See also ==
- Timeline of Scottish history
