= Robert Erskine (physician) =

Scottish physician (1677–1718)

Robert Erskine FRS (1677–1718) was a Scottish physician remembered as an advisor to Tsar Peter the Great. He became one of the Tsar's most powerful advisors. He was known in Russia as Robert Karlovich Areskin.

== Life ==
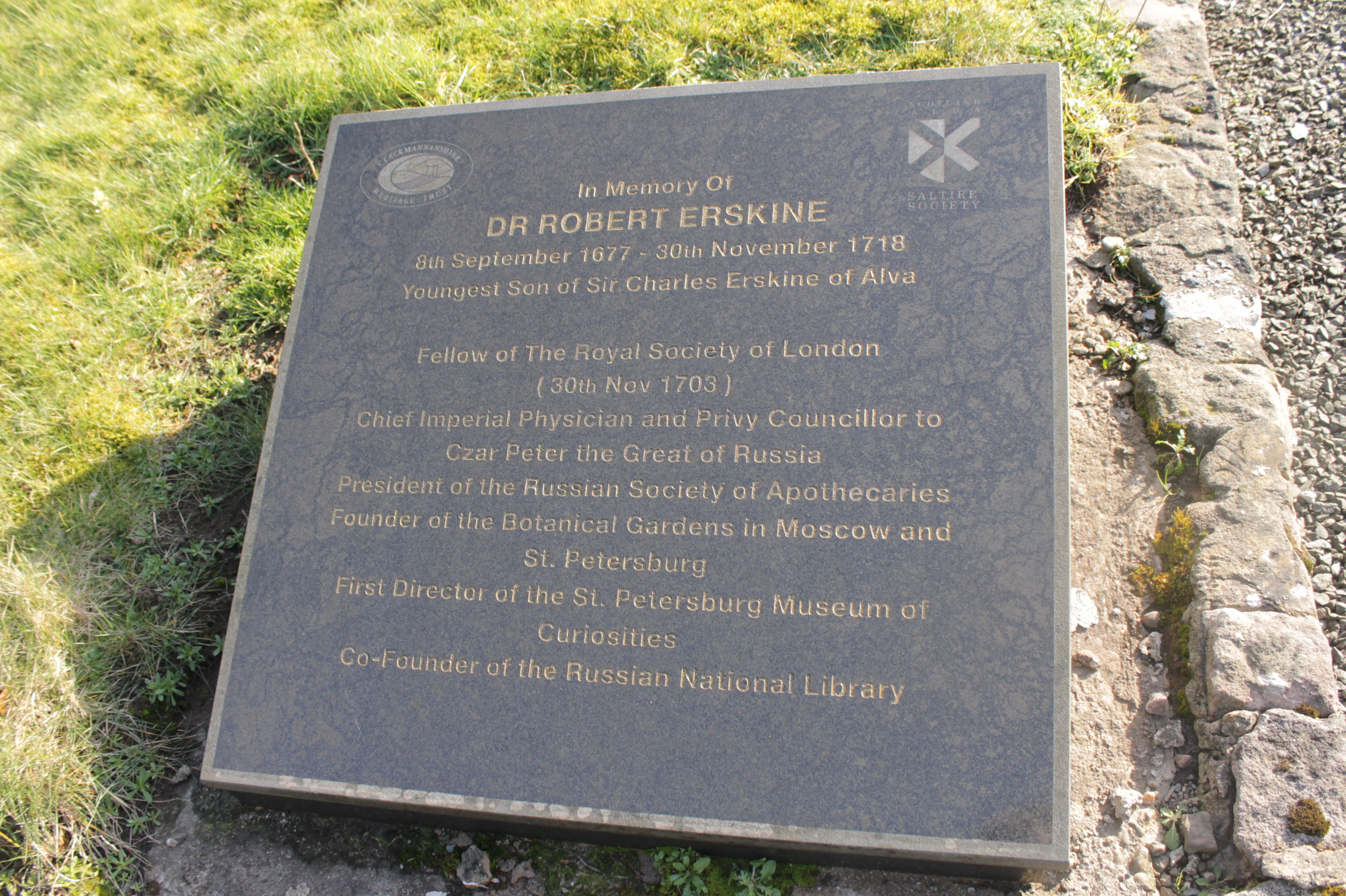
Memorial to Erskine, old Alva churchyard

He was born on 8 September 1677 a third son of Sir Charles Erskine, 1st Baronet of Alva and his wife Christian Dundas of Arniston. He was born in the family home of Alva House in Clackmannanshire. His younger brother was Charles Erskine, Lord Tinwald. He was also a first cousin of John Erskine, Earl of Mar (1675–1732) and Robert Dundas of Arniston, the Elder, and uncle to James Erskine, Lord Alva.

He engaged in medical studies in Edinburgh, Paris and Utrecht receiving a doctorate in medicine in the latter, and was made a Fellow of the Royal Society in 1703. He arrived in Russia in the summer of 1704 originally as physician to Alexander Menshikov but within 6 months had found favour in the court of the tsar. Head of the entire medical chancellery, he was the Tsar's chief physician. He was appointed the first director of the St. Petersburg Kunstkamera and library with Johann Daniel Schumacher as his assistant. He created Russia's first herbarium in 1709.

In 1716, the Tsar elevated him to privy councillor. In 1717 he escorted the Tsar on a trip to Germany, Holland and France. Two medical doctors who worked for Erskine, Thomas Garvine and John Bell, were members of trading expeditions to China from 1715 to 1720.

He died at Olonets near St Petersburg on St Andrew's Day, 30 November 1718 and was buried in the Alexander Nevsky Lavra in St Petersburg on 4 January 1719 being granted a full state funeral attended by the tsar. Erskine was a part of masonic network of Scottish Jacobites that influenced the Russian court. A memorial was erected in his memory in Alva churchyard on the 8th of September 2006. Dr Robert Erskine was also commemorated in St Petersburg, Russia on the 2nd of October 2008 by the unveiling of a plaque in the Aleksander Nevsky Lavra.

== Sources ==
- "Арескин, Роберт" . Brockhaus and Efron Encyclopedic Dictionary (in Russian). 1906.
- Collis, Robert (2009) "Hewing the Rough Stone: Masonic Influence in Peter the Great's Russia, 1689-1725". In Andreas Önnerfors, Robert Collis (eds.) Freemasonry and Fraternalism in Eighteenth-Century Russia. Sheffield Lectures on the History of Freemasonry and Fraternalism. Volume Two. The University of Sheffield.
- Jozien J. Driessen-Van het Reve (2006) De Kunstkamera van Peter de Grote. De Hollandse inbreng, gereconstrueerd uit brieven van Albert Seba en Johann Daniel Schumacher uit de jaren 1711-1752, p. 184. Hilversum, Verloren. ISBN 9789065509277
