= 1834 in the United Kingdom =

Events from the year 1834 in the United Kingdom. Uniquely, four Prime Ministers serve during the year.

== Incumbents ==
- Monarch – William IV
- Prime Minister – Charles Grey, 2nd Earl Grey (Whig) (until 16 July); William Lamb, 2nd Viscount Melbourne (Whig) (starting 16 July, until 14 November); Arthur Wellesley, 1st Duke of Wellington (Tory) (starting 14 November, until 10 December); Robert Peel (Conservative) (starting 10 December)
- Foreign Secretary – Henry John Temple, 3rd Viscount Palmerston (until 14 November) Arthur Wellesley, 1st Duke of Wellington (starting 14 November)
- Home Secretary – William Lamb, 2nd Viscount Melbourne (until 16 July) John Ponsonby, 4th Earl of Bessborough (until 15 November) Arthur Wellesley, 1st Duke of Wellington (until 15 December) Henry Goulburn (starting 15 December)
- Secretary of War – Edward Smith-Stanley (until 5 June) Thomas Spring Rice (5 June until 14 November) Duke of Wellington (17 November to 9 December) Lord Aberdeen (starting 20 December)

== Events ==
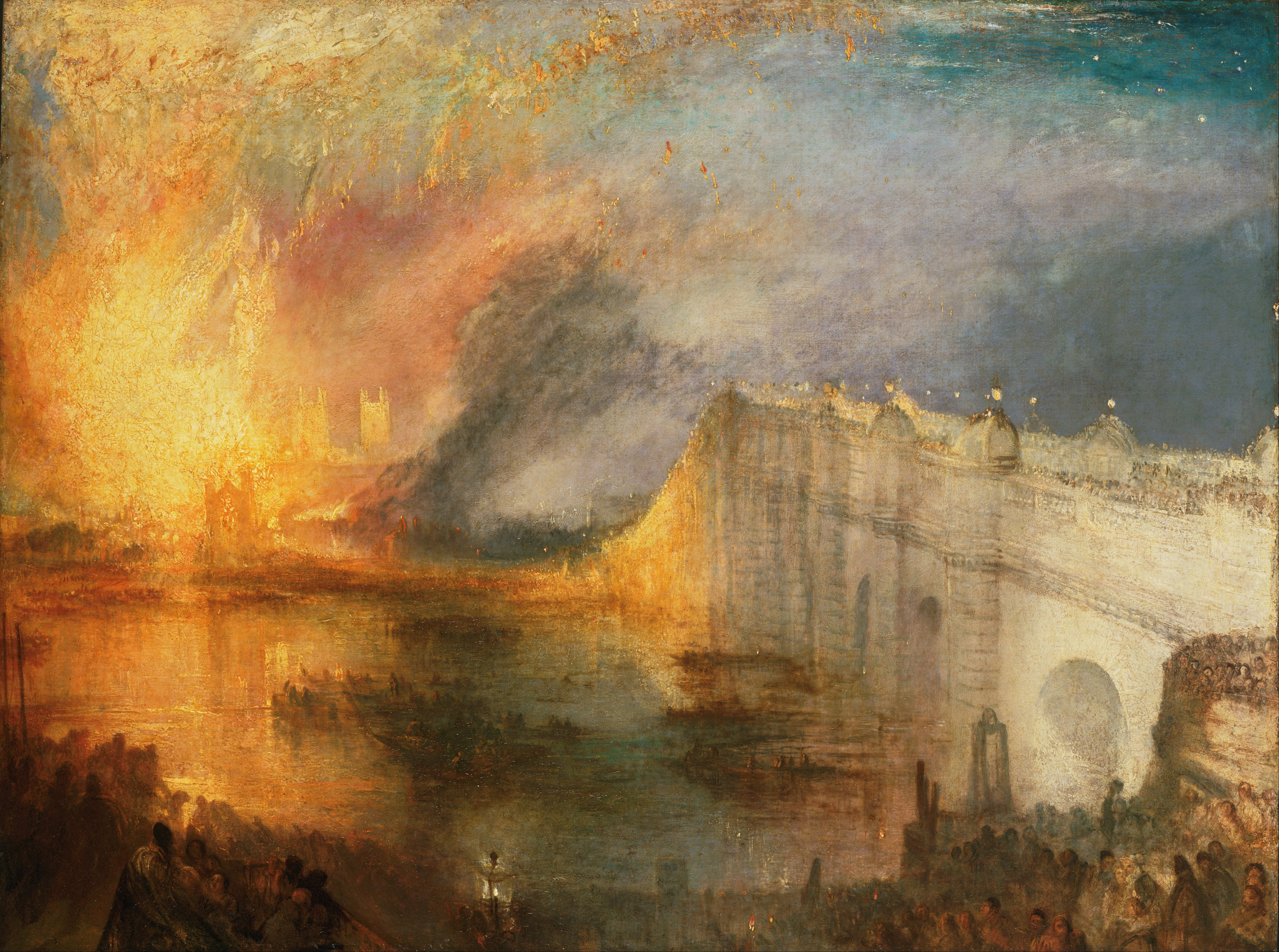
The Burning of the Houses of Lords and Commons by J. M. W. Turner (1835). Turner witnessed the fire (16 October 1834), and painted the subject several times.

- February – Robert Owen organises the Grand National Consolidated Trades Union.
- March – William Whewell (anonymously) first publishes the term scientist in the Quarterly Review (but notes it as "not generally palatable").
- 18 March – The Tolpuddle Martyrs, six Dorset farm labourers, are sentenced to be transported to a penal colony for forming a trade union.
- 22 April – The UK, France, Spain and Portugal sign the Quadruple Alliance.
- 23 May – The Exchequer is abolished as a revenue collecting department of the British government by the Office of Receipt of Exchequer Act.
- 23 June – HMS Tartarus is launched at Pembroke Dock. It is the Royal Navy's first steam-powered man-of-war (a paddle gunvessel).
- 16 July – Lord Melbourne succeeds Earl Grey as Prime Minister of the United Kingdom.
- 25 July – Hanging in chains upon a gibbet after execution is abolished in England by the Hanging-in-Chains Abolition Act.
- August – Foresters Friendly Society formed as the Ancient Order of Foresters in Rochdale.
- 1 August – Slavery abolished in most of the British Empire by the Slavery Abolition Act 1833. Construction begins on a Wilberforce Monument in Kingston upon Hull.
- 14 August – Poor Law Amendment Act states the able-bodied cannot receive assistance unless they enter a workhouse; poor-law authorities should no longer attempt to identify the fathers of illegitimate children to recover support from them.
- 15 August – Parliament approves the creation of the colony of South Australia.
- 11 September – Emigrant ship Sybelle out of Cromarty (Scotland) is wrecked off St. Paul Island (Nova Scotia) with the loss of all 316 passengers and all but six of her crew.
- 22 September – The Leeds and Selby Railway in Yorkshire is officially opened. At 700 yards (640 m) long, its Marsh Lane tunnel through Richmond Hill, Leeds, is the world's longest railway tunnel at this date and the first through which passengers are hauled by steam locomotives.
- 7 October – Birmingham Town Hall, designed by Joseph Hansom and Edward Welch, is opened for the Birmingham Triennial Music Festival.
- 16 October – Burning of Parliament: Much of the Palace of Westminster is destroyed by fire resulting from the burning of tally sticks formerly used by the Exchequer.
- 14 November – William IV dismisses the government of Melbourne, after proposals for Church reform are made. The Duke of Wellington forms a caretaker government. This will be the last time a British sovereign chooses a Prime Minister contrary to the will of Parliament.
- 24 November – Opening of the first purpose-built Temperance Hall in Britain, at Garstang in Lancashire.
- 10 December – Sir Robert Peel forms his first government.
- 17 December – The Dublin and Kingstown Railway, the first public railway in Ireland, opens between Dublin and Kingstown.
- 18 December
  - Tamworth Manifesto published: Peel outlines his guiding principles of government, regarded as the basis of the modern Conservative Party.
  - Tithe War in Ireland: "Rathcormac massacre": At Gortroe, near Rathcormac, County Cork, armed Constabulary reinforced by the regular British Army kill at least nine and wound thirty protesters against tithes.
- 23 December – Architect and inventor Joseph Hansom patents the Hansom cab.
- 26 December – Ursulines of Jesus take up residence at St Margaret's Convent in the Whitehouse in Edinburgh, the first Roman Catholic convent established in Scotland since the Reformation; it will be another 5 years before the first such modern establishment in England.

=== Undated ===
- British East India Company monopoly on China trade ended.
- The Institute of British Architects in London, predecessor of the Royal Institute of British Architects, is formed.
- Harrods founded as a wholesale tea dealer in Stepney in the East End of London.
- Augustus Smith acquires the lease on the Isles of Scilly from the Duchy of Cornwall.
- History of computing hardware: Charles Babbage begins the conceptual design of an "analytical engine", a mechanical forerunner of the modern computer. It will not be built in his lifetime.
- A "Fancy Toy Dog Show" is held at Elephant and Castle in London.
- With an average Central England temperature of 10.51 °C or 50.92 °F, this narrowly overtakes 1733 as the hottest calendar year in the CET record until equalled in 1921 and beaten in 1949.

== Publications ==
- W. Harrison Ainsworth's (anonymous) first novel Rookwood, an historical romance featuring the highwayman Dick Turpin.
- Edward Bulwer's (anonymous) novel The Last Days of Pompeii.
- Cuthbert Sharp's collection The Bishoprick Garland.

== Births ==
- 28 January – Sabine Baring-Gould, hagiographer, antiquarian, novelist, Anglican rector and eclectic scholar (died 1924)
- 17 February – John Thelwall, radical (born 1764)
- 15 February – William Henry Preece, electrical engineer and inventor (died 1913)
- 19 February – Charles Davis Lucas, Irish Victoria Cross recipient (died 1914)
- 28 February – Charles Santley, baritone (died 1922)
- 6 March – George du Maurier, cartoonist and novelist (died 1896)
- 16 March – James Hector, geologist (died 1907)
- 24 March – William Morris, artist, writer, socialist and activist (died 1896)
- 30 April – John Lubbock, banker, archaeologist, Liberal politician, philanthropist and polymath (died 1913)
- 19 June – Charles Spurgeon, Baptist preacher (died 1892)
- 28 June – Samuel Pasco, United States Senator from Florida from 1887 to 1899 (died 1917)
- 4 July – Christopher Dresser, designer influential in the Anglo-Japanese style (died 1904)
- 4 August – John Venn, mathematician (died 1923)
- 23 August – Hugh Owen Thomas, Welsh-born orthopaedic surgeon (died 1891)
- 9 September – Joseph Henry Shorthouse, novelist (died 1903)
- 23 November – James Thomson ("B.V."), Scottish-born poet (died 1882)
- 24 December – Augustus George Vernon Harcourt, chemist (died 1919)

== Deaths ==
- 12 January – William Wyndham Grenville, 1st Baron Grenville, Prime Minister of the United Kingdom (born 1759)
- 11 April – John 'Mad Jack' Fuller, philanthropist and patron of the arts and sciences (born 1757)
- 12 July – David Douglas, botanist (born 1799)
- 25 July – Samuel Taylor Coleridge, poet, critic, and philosopher (born 1772)
- 1 August – Robert Morrison, Protestant missionary to China (born 1782)
- 2 September – Thomas Telford, engineer (born 1757)
- 16 September – William Blackwood, writer (born 1776)
- 11 October – William John Napier, 9th Lord Napier, Navy officer, politician and diplomat (born 1786)
- 5 December – Thomas Pringle, poet (born 1789)
- 23 December – Thomas Malthus, demographer and economist (born 1766)
- 27 December – Charles Lamb, essayist (born 1775)
