= 1727 in Wales =

- Centuries: 16th; 17th; 18th; 19th; 20th
- Decades: 1700s; 1710s; 1720s; 1730s; 1740s
- See also: List of years in Wales; Timeline of Welsh history 1727 in Great Britain Scotland Elsewhere

This article is about the particular significance of the year 1727 to Wales and its people.

== Incumbents ==
- Lord Lieutenant of North Wales (Lord Lieutenant of Anglesey, Caernarvonshire, Denbighshire, Flintshire, Merionethshire, Montgomeryshire) – George Cholmondeley, 2nd Earl of Cholmondeley
- Lord Lieutenant of Glamorgan – vacant until 1729
- Lord Lieutenant of Brecknockshire and Lord Lieutenant of Monmouthshire – Sir William Morgan of Tredegar
- Lord Lieutenant of Cardiganshire – John Vaughan, 2nd Viscount Lisburne
- Lord Lieutenant of Carmarthenshire – vacant until 1755
- Lord Lieutenant of Pembrokeshire – Sir Arthur Owen, 3rd Baronet
- Lord Lieutenant of Radnorshire – James Brydges, 1st Duke of Chandos
- Bishop of Bangor – William Baker (until 19 December)
- Bishop of Llandaff – Robert Clavering
- Bishop of St Asaph – John Wynne (until 17 December); Francis Hare (from 17 December)
- Bishop of St Davids – Richard Smalbroke

== Events ==
- 22 June - On the death of his father, King George I of Great Britain, the Prince of Wales becomes King George II of Great Britain.
- 25 August - Herbert Mackworth inherits the Gnoll estate, Neath, on his father's death.
- 17 October - In the general election:
  - Bussy Manse becomes MP for Cardiff.
  - Hugh Williams (of Chester) retains his seat as MP for Anglesey.
- date unknown
  - The Piercefield estate is sold for £3,366, 5.6d to Thomas Rous of Wotton-under-Edge.
  - Sir Roger Mostyn, 3rd Baronet, becomes Custos Rotulorum of Flintshire.

== Arts and literature ==
=== New books ===
- Rowland Ellis - English translation of Ellis Pugh's Annerch ir Cymru (the first Welsh book printed in America)
- William Gambold - A Grammar of the Welsh Language
- Matthias Maurice - Y Wir Eglwys

== Births ==
- 4 May - Paul Panton, antiquarian collector (died 1797)
- 8 June - Thomas Morgan (of Rhiwpera), politician (died 1771)
- date unknown - John Dafydd, hymn-writer (died 1783)

== Deaths ==
- 25 August - Sir Humphrey Mackworth, industrialist and politician, 70
- 6 September - George Hooper, Bishop of St Asaph 1703-4, 86
- date unknown - Ann Maddocks, the "Maid of Cefn Ydfa", 23
