= 1728 in Wales =

- Centuries: 16th; 17th; 18th; 19th; 20th
- Decades: 1700s; 1710s; 1720s; 1730s; 1740s
- See also: List of years in Wales; Timeline of Welsh history 1728 in Great Britain Scotland Elsewhere

This article is about the particular significance of the year 1728 to Wales and its people.

== Incumbents ==
- Lord Lieutenant of North Wales (Lord Lieutenant of Anglesey, Caernarvonshire, Denbighshire, Flintshire, Merionethshire, Montgomeryshire) – George Cholmondeley, 2nd Earl of Cholmondeley
- Lord Lieutenant of Glamorgan – vacant until 1729
- Lord Lieutenant of Brecknockshire and Lord Lieutenant of Monmouthshire – Sir William Morgan of Tredegar
- Lord Lieutenant of Cardiganshire – John Vaughan, 2nd Viscount Lisburne
- Lord Lieutenant of Carmarthenshire – vacant until 1755
- Lord Lieutenant of Pembrokeshire – Sir Arthur Owen, 3rd Baronet
- Lord Lieutenant of Radnorshire – James Brydges, 1st Duke of Chandos
- Bishop of Bangor – Thomas Sherlock (from 4 February)
- Bishop of Llandaff – Robert Clavering
- Bishop of St Asaph – Francis Hare
- Bishop of St Davids – Richard Smalbroke

== Events ==
- 4 February - Thomas Sherlock is consecrated Bishop of Bangor.
- August - Richard Smalbroke, Bishop of St Davids, commends the treatise on the authority of Scripture by Faustus Socinus, with the result that the work is translated into English and published in 1731 with a dedication to the Queen, Caroline of Ansbach.
- date unknown
  - The Coronet of Frederick, Prince of Wales, is made, probably by royal goldsmith Samuel Shales, at a cost of £140 5/- (one hundred and forty pounds and five shillings)
  - Poet John Morgan becomes vicar of Matching, Essex, which leads to his commonly being known as John Morgan Matchin.
  - Main Street North Wales, Pennsylvania, originally an old Indian trail, is laid out as the "Great Road".
  - Watkin Williams-Wynn, the future 3rd Baronet, is mayor of Oswestry.

== Arts and literature ==
=== New books ===
- Richard Lewis, Muscipula, a translation of Edward Holdsworth's Latin satire on the Welsh
- John Roderick, Grammadeg Cymraeg

=== Music ===
- The traditional Welsh folk tune, "The Ash Grove", or something very similar, is featured in John Gay's The Beggar's Opera.

== Births ==
- date unknown
  - John "Iron-Mad" Wilkinson, English industrialist, owner of Bersham Ironworks and Brymbo Hall (died 1808)
- probable
  - Daines Barrington, judge in North Wales (died 1800
  - Edward Owen, translator (died 1807)

== Deaths ==
- 13 September - William Gambold, grammarian, 56
