= Sir Charles Erskine, 1st Baronet =

Scottish politician

Sir Charles Erskine, 1st Baronet (4 July 1643– 1690), of Alva, Fife, was a Scottish politician who sat in the Scottish Conventions in 1665 and 1667 and in the Parliament of Scotland from 1689 to 1690.

== Life ==
Coat of arms of Erskine of Alva: Quarterly: 1st and 4th Azure a bend between six cross crosslets fitchée or, 2nd and 3rd Argent a pale sable, all within a bordure quartered or and vert

He was born in Alva House which had been built by his father in 1636.

Erskine was the third, but eldest surviving son of Sir Charles Erskine of Alva and Cambuskenneth, and his wife Mary Hope, daughter of Sir Thomas Hope, 1st Baronet of Craighall. He succeeded his father as laird of Alva House on 8 July 1663 and purchased a baronetcy in Nova Scotia on 30 April 1666. Very few of the Nova Scotia baronets visited their lands, and the exercise was largely a money-raising exercise on the part of the Scottish Parliament, creating a new wave of baronets in the New World.

Erskine was returned as Shire Commissioner for Clackmannanshire to the Conventions in 1665 and in 1667. In 1689 he was elected MP for Stirlingshire in the Scottish Parliament.

He was returned as Shire Commissioner for Stirlingshire in 1689.

Erskine died on 4 June 1690 aged 46.

== Family ==
In about 1670 he married Christian Dundas, daughter of Sir James Dundas of Arniston (just south of Edinburgh).

They had at least four sons.

- Sir James Erskine, 2nd Baronet (c.1672-1693). He was killed at the Battle of Landen.
- Sir John Erskine, 3rd Baronet (1672-1739) Scottish Shire Commissioner and British Member of Parliament
- Robert Erskine (1677-1718) archiater (physician) to Peter the Great in Russia
- Charles Erskine, Lord Tinwald (1680-1763) Judge and Member of Parliament

His daughter Catherine married Patrick Campbell, Lord Monzie, one of the legal colleagues of her brother Lord Tinwald. His daughter Helen Erskine (-1724) married John Haldane (1660-1721), 14th baronet of Gleneagles His grandchildren included James Erskine, Lord Alva.

Parliament of Scotland
| Preceded by Sir Henry Bruce | Commissioner for Clackmannanshire; 1665 and 1667; With: Sir Henry Bruce | Succeeded by Sir Henry Bruce |
| Preceded by Not known | Commissioner for Stirlingshire; 1689-1690 | Succeeded by Sir John Houston |
Baronetage of Nova Scotia
| New creation | Baronet (of Alva); 1666-1690 | Succeeded by James Erskine |
