= 1730 in Wales =

- Centuries: 16th; 17th; 18th; 19th; 20th
- Decades: 1710s; 1720s; 1730s; 1740s; 1750s
- See also: List of years in Wales; Timeline of Welsh history 1730 in Great Britain Scotland Elsewhere

This article is about the particular significance of the year 1730 to Wales and its people.

== Incumbents ==
- Lord Lieutenant of North Wales (Lord Lieutenant of Anglesey, Caernarvonshire, Denbighshire, Flintshire, Merionethshire, Montgomeryshire) – George Cholmondeley, 2nd Earl of Cholmondeley
- Lord Lieutenant of Glamorgan – Charles Powlett, 3rd Duke of Bolton
- Lord Lieutenant of Brecknockshire and Lord Lieutenant of Monmouthshire – Sir William Morgan of Tredegar
- Lord Lieutenant of Cardiganshire – John Vaughan, 2nd Viscount Lisburne
- Lord Lieutenant of Carmarthenshire – vacant until 1755
- Lord Lieutenant of Pembrokeshire – Sir Arthur Owen, 3rd Baronet
- Lord Lieutenant of Radnorshire – James Brydges, 1st Duke of Chandos
- Bishop of Bangor – Thomas Sherlock
- Bishop of Llandaff – John Harris
- Bishop of St Asaph – Francis Hare
- Bishop of St Davids – Richard Smalbroke

== Events ==
- August - Sir John Glynne succeeds to the family baronetcy, following the deaths of his father and elder brother in successive years.
- William Hogarth is commissioned by Robert Jones of Fonmon Castle to paint The Jones Family Conversation Piece.
- Construction work is carried out on the north-east wing of Bodysgallen Hall.

== Arts and literature ==
=== New books ===
==== English language ====
- Joseph Harris - A Treatise on Navigation

==== Welsh language ====
- James Lewis & Christmas Samuel - Y Cyfrif Cywiraf o'r Pechod Gwreiddiol
- William Wotton (ed.) - Cyfreithieu Hywel Dda ac eraill, seu Leges Wallicae (Laws of Hywel Dda)

== Births ==
- date unknown
  - Samuel Levi Phillips, banker (died 1812)
  - Nathaniel Thomas, writer (died c.1768)
- probable – Thomas Nowell, academic (died 1801)

== Deaths ==
- 16 May – John Evans, clergyman, 50?
- 19 June – Thomas Trevor, 1st Baron Trevor, politician, 72
- August - Sir William Glynne, 5th Baronet, 21
- 28 November – James Phillips, MP for Carmarthen, 58
- December – Owen Gruffydd, poet, 86/87
