= 1733 in Wales =

- Centuries: 16th; 17th; 18th; 19th; 20th
- Decades: 1710s; 1720s; 1730s; 1740s; 1750s
- See also: List of years in Wales; Timeline of Welsh history 1733 in Great Britain Scotland Elsewhere

This article is about the particular significance of the year 1733 to Wales and its people.

== Incumbents ==
- Lord Lieutenant of North Wales (Lord Lieutenant of Anglesey, Caernarvonshire, Denbighshire, Flintshire, Merionethshire, Montgomeryshire) – George Cholmondeley, 2nd Earl of Cholmondeley (until 7 May); George Cholmondeley, 3rd Earl of Cholmondeley (from 14 June)
- Lord Lieutenant of Glamorgan – Charles Powlett, 3rd Duke of Bolton
- Lord Lieutenant of Brecknockshire and Lord Lieutenant of Monmouthshire – Thomas Morgan
- Lord Lieutenant of Cardiganshire – John Vaughan, 2nd Viscount Lisburne
- Lord Lieutenant of Carmarthenshire – vacant until 1755
- Lord Lieutenant of Denbighshire – Sir Robert Salusbury Cotton, 3rd Baronet (from 21 June)
- Lord Lieutenant of Pembrokeshire – Sir Arthur Owen, 3rd Baronet
- Lord Lieutenant of Radnorshire – James Brydges, 1st Duke of Chandos
- Bishop of Bangor – Thomas Sherlock
- Bishop of Llandaff – John Harris
- Bishop of St Asaph – Thomas Tanner (from 23 January)
- Bishop of St Davids – Nicholas Clagett

== Events ==
- 21 June - The post of Lord Lieutenant of Denbighshire is combined with that of Custos Rotulorum of Denbighshire.
- 29 November - Charles Talbot is appointed Lord Chancellor.
- 5 December - Charles Talbot, 1st Baron Talbot of Hensol, is raised to the peerage.
- date unknown
  - Legal proceedings in the Welsh courts to be conducted in the English language.
  - John Myddelton, politician, inherits the estates of his brother Robert, including Chirk Castle.

== Arts and literature ==
=== New books ===
- "Gwinfrid Shones" (popular ballad)
- William Wynn writes his first poem, while a student at Oxford.

== Births ==
- March - John Lloyd, Rector of Caerwys, antiquary (died 1793)

== Deaths ==
- 22 January - Thomas Herbert, 8th Earl of Pembroke, about 66
- 2 February - Robert Price, judge, 80
- 28 February - John Morgan, poet, 45
- 7 May - George Cholmondeley, 2nd Earl of Cholmondeley, Lord Lieutenant of North Wales, 66/67
- June/July - Michael Pritchard, poet, 24
- date unknown - Robert Myddelton, owner of the Myddelton estates
