= Charles Erskine (1716–1749) =

Scottish lawyer and politician

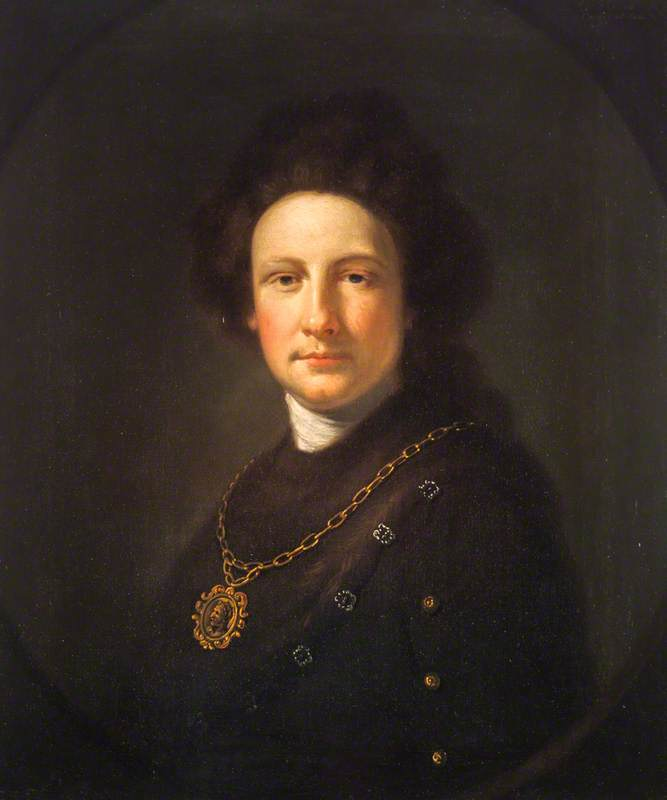
Charles Erskine, 1747 portrait by Thomas Hudson

Charles Erskine (21 October 1716 – 25 June 1749) was a Scottish lawyer and politician. He sat in the House of Commons of Great Britain from 1747 to 1749.

The oldest son of Charles Erskine, Lord Tinwald, he was educated at Corpus Christi College, Cambridge and at the Middle Temple, where he was called to the bar in 1739. He was called to Lincoln's Inn in 1743.

At the 1747 general election he was returned by the 3rd Duke of Argyll as Member of Parliament (MP) for Ayr Burghs. However, he died only two years later, aged 32.

His younger brother was James Erskine, Lord Alva.

Parliament of Great Britain
Preceded by The Earl of Granard	Member of Parliament for Ayr Burghs; 1747–1749	Succeeded by Sir Henry Erskine, Bt
