= John Gambold =

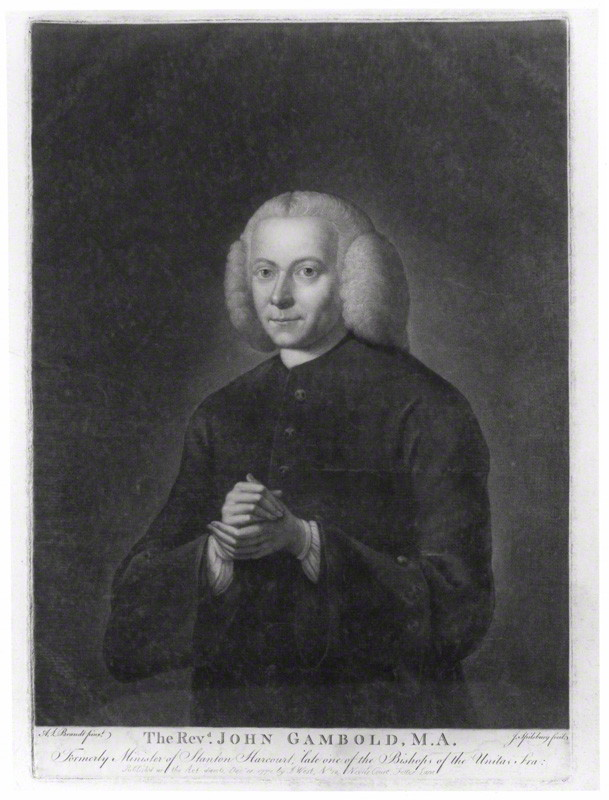
John Gambold

John Gambold (10 April 1711 – 13 September 1771), was bishop of the Unitas Fratrum.

== Early life ==
John Gambold was born in Puncheston, Pembrokeshire, the son of William Gambold, a clergyman in the Church of England. He received his early education at home. In 1726 he became a servitor at Christ Church, Oxford. He enjoyed poetry and drama. His father's death in 1728 affected him, and for a couple of years he abandoned himself to religious melancholy. In March 1730 he became friends with Charles Wesley, who had entered at Christ Church in the same year. Charles brought him under the influence of John Wesley, and he joined the "Holy Club" which was a forerunner to the Methodist church. Gambold wrote an account of this time in the club in 1736, which is one of the most important primary sources.

He was influenced by the Wesley brothers, but preferred quietism to evangelistic activity preferring the study of the earlier Greek Fathers, and was captivated by their mysticism.

== Ordination and priesthood ==
Gambold entered for the Anglican priesthood and was ordained in September 1733 by John Potter, the bishop of Oxford. In 1735 he became vicar of Stanton Harcourt, in Oxfordshire. For about two years (1736–1768) Keziah Wesley, a sister of the Wesley brothers, was a member of his household.

Gambold attended to the duties of his small parish, but spent much time in contemplation. When John Wesley returned from Georgia in 1738 he introduced Gambold to the Moravian missionary, Peter Boehler, and Gambold acted as Boehler's interpreter when he was giving lectures at Oxford. In 1739 he became influenced by a meeting with Count Zinzendorf, later translating Zinzendorf's German addresses.

His religious musings found expression in a dramatic piece, the most important of his poems, written in 1740. In December 1740 he had a visit from his younger brother, who gave him an account of the London Moravians; he was attracted by the homely warmth of their fellowship. Accompanying his brother to London (1741) he came under the influence of Philip Henry Molther.

Gambold broke with Wesley on 2 July 1741. He preached before the University of Oxford on 27 December 1741 a sermon of rather high church tinge. In October 1742 he resigned his living, having been for some little time with the Moravians in London. He was admitted a member of their society in November, while teacher in a boarding-school at Broadoaks, Essex. On 14 May 1743 he married Elizabeth Walker (7 December 1719 – 13 November 1803), a daughter of Joseph Walker of Littletown in the West Riding of Yorkshire, and became master at a school at Haverfordwest in Pembrokeshire.

== Return to London ==
In November 1744 Gambold returned to London and became a stated preacher at Fetter Lane. In December 1745 Wesley found him unwilling to renew their former intercourse; they met again in 1763, but Gambold was still shy, yet Wesley spoke of him to the last (1770) as one of the most "sensible men in England". Gambold took part, in March 1747, in a synod of the brethren at Herrnhaag in the Rhine provinces. In 1749 he addressed a letter to Zinzendorf, proposing the formation of an "Anglican tropus", a plan for the admission, as Moravian brethren, of persons who should still remain members of the church of England. Gambold was willing to concede that an Anglican prelate should exercise some supervision in Moravian affairs, and assist at their ordinations; also that the common prayer-book should be adopted in their assemblies. The latter provision was not carried out; but, at a synod in London in September 1749, Thomas Wilson, the bishop of Sodor and Man, was chosen "antistes" of the "reformed tropus" (with permission to employ his son as substitute).

In 1753 the Moravian community lost by secession Benjamin Ingham and his following. Gambold exerted himself to repair the loss. At a synod held at Lindsey House, Chelsea, he was consecrated a 'chorepiscopus' in November 1754 by Bishops Johannes de Watteville, John Nitschmann, and David Nitschmann the younger. Till 1768 his home was in London, but his duties often took him on his travels. He had much to do with the reorganisation of Moravianism at the synod of Marienborn in July and August 1764, four years after Zinzendorf's death. In 1765 he founded the community at Cootehill, co. Cavan. His health failed in 1768, owing to a "dropsical asthma", and he retired in the autumn to Haverfordwest. There he continued his ministrations until five days before his death, which occurred on 13 September 1771. He left a son and daughter. His portrait was painted by Abraham Louis Brandt, a Moravian minister; from this there is mezzotint (1771) by Spilsbury, a copy drawn by Hibbart (1789), and a small engraving by Topham (1816).

Gambold never had an enemy, but he made few friends. The hesitations of his career are in part to be explained by the underlying scepticism of his intellectual temperament, from which he found refuge in an anxious and reclusive piety. This appears in his poems, e.g. "The Mystery of Life", his epitaph for himself, in which occurs the line, "He suffered human life—and died"; and still more in his letters. His very remarkable "Letter to a Studious Young Lady" (1737) contains a curious argument to show that any absorbing pursuits will elevate the mind equally well. In an unpublished letter (15 April 1740) to Wesley he writes: "I hang upon the Gospel by a mere thread, this small unaccountable inclination towards Christ." He draws his own picture in the character of Claudius, the Roman soldier of his drama. His verse is often striking, and never conventional; many of his hymns have become widely known.

== List of works ==
=== Self-published ===
- Christianity, Tidings of Joy, &c., Oxford [1741], 8vo (university sermon).
- Ἡ καινὴ διαθήκη, &c., Oxford, 1742, 12mo (Mill's text, Bengel's divisions; Gambold's name does not appear).
- Maxims ... of Count Zinzendorf, &c., 1751, 8vo.
- A Modest Plea, &c., 1754, 8vo.
- A Collection of Hymns, &c., 1754, 8vo, 2 vols. (to this collection, edited by Gambold, he contributed eleven translations and twenty-eight original hymns; he had previously contributed to collections of Moravian hymns, printed in 1748, 1749, and 1752; a hymn-book for children is said to have been printed by his own hand at Lindsey House).
- The Reasonableness and Extent of Religious Reverence, &c., 1756, 8vo.
- A Short Summary of Christian Doctrine, &c., 1765, 12mo; 2nd edit. 1767, 12mo (catechism, in which the answers are entirely in the language of the Book of Common Prayer).
- The Martyrdom of St. Ignatius, &c., 1773, 8vo (written 1740; edited by Benjamin La Trobe).

=== Collaborative ===
- Assisted in editing the Acta Fratrum Unitatis in Anglia, &c., 1749;
- Edited an edition of Lord Bacon's Works, 1765, 5 vols.
- Revised the translation of Cranz's History of Greenland, 1767, 2 vols.,
- Contributed prefaces, &c., to many Moravian publications from 1752 onward.
- He is said to have translated Rhys Prichard's Divine Poems from Welsh into English. His works were first published at Bath in 1789, with anonymous Life by Benjamin La Trobe. Thomas Erskine of Linlathen re-edited them, Glasgow, 1822; 2nd edit. 1823.
- His Poetical Works (not including the hymns) were published in 1816, (preface dated "Darlington, 17 April").
