= Barjarg Tower =

Coordinates: 55.1919°N 3.7641°W

Barjarg Tower is an L-plan tower house probably dating from 1680, four miles south-east of Penpont, Dumfriesshire, Scotland. It is attached to a 19th-century mansion.

== History ==
The land appears to have been given to Thomas Grierson by the Earl of Morton in 1587. His son John Grierson and his wife Grizel Kilpatrick built the tower. Subsequent owners included the judge Lord Tinwald and the minister Andrew Hunter.

== Structure ==
The castle, which has been modernised within, has a crenellated parapet, which may be a later addition. It has one open round turret at one corner and two conically capped turrets at two others. The castle, which has four storeys and an attic, is built of red rubble.

It is a category B listed building.
