= John Donaldson (painter) =

Scottish miniature painter (1737–1801)

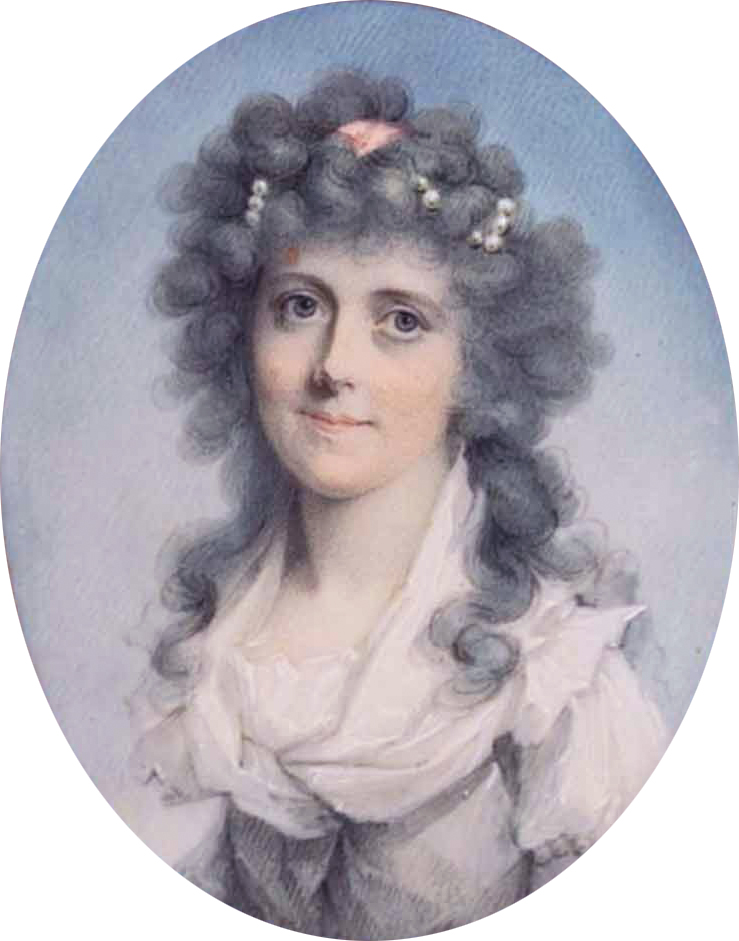
Sarah Garrow, née Dore by John Donaldson, painted miniature on ivory

John Donaldson was born at Edinburgh in 1737, and distinguished himself as a miniature painter, both in enamel and water-colours. In the year 1764, and again in 1768, he obtained the premium given by the Society of Arts for the best picture in enamel. He occasionally amused himself with the point, and etched several plates of beggars, after Rembrandt, which possess considerable merit. He died in London in 1801.
