= 1727 in Great Britain =

Events from the year 1727 in Great Britain. This year sees a change of monarch.

== Incumbents ==
- Monarch – George I (until 11 June), George II (starting 11 June)
- Prime Minister – Robert Walpole (Whig)

== Events ==
- February – Spain besieges Gibraltar in order to recapture the territory.
- 20 February – the German composer George Frideric Handel becomes a British subject under terms of the Handel's Naturalisation Act 1727.
- 31 May – the Royal Bank of Scotland is founded by Royal Charter in Edinburgh.
- 11 June – King George I dies en route to Hanover (where he will be buried). His son, George, Prince of Wales, becomes King George II of Great Britain.
- 30 August – Anne, eldest daughter of George II, is given the title Princess Royal.
- 8 September – a barn fire during a puppet show in the village of Burwell, Cambridgeshire, kills 78 people, many of them children.
- 11 October – coronation of George II at Westminster Abbey. Handel's Coronation Anthems are composed for the event, including Zadok the Priest which is sung at every subsequent coronation.

=== Unknown date ===
- An old woman known as Janet (Jenny) Horne of Loth, Sutherland, becomes the last alleged witch in the British Isles to be executed when she is burned at the stake in Dornoch, Scotland. (Some sources give the date as June 1722.)

== Births ==
- 2 January – James Wolfe, general, Hero of Quebec by defeating the invading French (died 1759)
- 14 May – Thomas Gainsborough, artist (died 1788)
- 9 October – David Murray, 2nd Earl of Mansfield, politician (died 1796)

== Deaths ==
- 31 March – Sir Isaac Newton, scientist (born 1642)
- 11 June – King George I (born 1660, Hanover)
- 23 July – Simon Harcourt, 1st Viscount Harcourt, Lord Chancellor of Great Britain (born c. 1660)
- 14 August – William Croft, composer (born 1678)

== See also ==
- 1727 in Wales
