= James Clark (physician in Dominica) =

Scottish physician (1737–1819)

Dr James Clark or Clarke FRS FRSE (1737-1819) was a Scottish doctor and plantation-owner strongly linked to the history of the Dominica. His treatise on yellow fever earned him instant fame and Fellowship in both the Royal Society of London and Royal Society of Edinburgh. He was a physician, chemist and natural historian. He made significant advances on the understanding of the nature of contagious diseases.

== Life ==
James Clark was a doctor in Aberdeen working there in the mid-18th century.

Around 1770 he sailed to Dominica. Here he acquired a sugar plantation which still exists today, known either as Clark Hall Estate or Clarke Hall Estate. He also owned coffee plantations. In his 40 years on the island he amassed a considerable fortune. He also served a role in the governance of the island, serving on HM Council.

In Dominica he spent much time with fellow-Scot and fellow-plantation-owner, Dr James Laing, who owned the Shillingford Estate which made Macoucherie Rum. Laing is noted as being the donator of the famous 61-minute clock on Crimond Church which originally came from Laing’s estate at Haddo.

In 1793 an epidemic of yellow fever, one of the most lethal tropical diseases of its day, hit Dominica, beginning on 15 June, from a white sailor in the harbour, having originated in Grenada on the ship Hankey. Dr Clark made a first-hand study of the outbreak, which lasted three years and published his findings in 1797. The study hypothesised about the reasons for the outbreak and was one of the first studies to hint at the role of mosquitoes in the spread of disease. He also discusses symptoms of the disease and possible means of prevention. The study also branches into commentary on other diseases such as typhus, dysentery, cholera and tetanus. It also made a chemical analysis and assessment of the curative properties of the hot mineral springs on the island. James also observed that newcomers (regardless of race) were particularly susceptible to yellow fever, hinting at a degree of immunity within the static population.

He was elected a Fellow of the Royal Society of Edinburgh in 1791 (prior to his famous treatise), his main proposer being James Hutton, and elected a Fellow of the Royal Society of London in 1799 (due to his treatise). He was also a Fellow of the Royal College of Physicians of Edinburgh (1792), and a Fellow of both the Society of Antiquaries and Society of Arts.

He returned to Britain around 1810, presumably in a state of retiral. He appears to have then resided in the Hatton Garden district of London at or near the house of his daughter. He died in the Hatton Garden district of London on 21 January 1819.

== Family ==
Clark had an Afro-European common law wife in Dominica known as Mary Clark. Four children survived: two sons and two daughters. His two daughters, Ann Eliza Clark and Sarah Clark, returned to Britain, the former marrying Mr Sim of Hatton Garden. George Clark became a millwright in Jamaica and later a merchant in Rotterdam. Edward Clark was a clerk on Dominica.

On the death of James Clark, George inherited the Clark Hall Estate. George was one of the many thousands of persons compensated when Britain passed the Slavery Abolition Act 1833.

== Publications ==
- A Treatise on the Yellow Fever as it appeared in the Island of Dominica in the years 1793-1796 (published in London, 1797)
