= 1728 in Great Britain =

Events from the year 1728 in Great Britain.

== Incumbents ==
- Monarch – George II
- Prime Minister – Robert Walpole (Whig)

== Events ==
- 10 January – The Provoked Husband a comedy based on an unfinished John Vanbrugh play completed by Colley Cibber premieres at the Theatre Royal, Drury Lane. It appears to be the hit of the theatre season until eclipsed by The Beggars Opera a few weeks later.
- 29 January – The first performance of John Gay's The Beggar's Opera at the Lincoln's Inn Fields Theatre. A major success it leads to a theatre boom and is followed by a number of other ballad operas imitating its style.
- March – Spain ends its siege of Gibraltar.
- 31 May – The Royal Bank of Scotland extends the first overdraft (to Edinburgh merchant William Hogg for £1,000).
- 14 June – Congress of Soissons begins in an effort to end the Anglo-Spanish War.
- Late Summer – Voltaire ends his exile in England.
- September – Astronomer James Bradley uses stellar aberration (first observed in 1725) to calculate the speed of light.
- James Bradley observes nutation of the Earth's axis.
- The King's son Frederick, Prince of Wales, arrives in Britain for the first time, aged 21. He has previously lived in Hanover as the House of Hanover's principal resident there since the Hanoverian Succession to the British throne in 1714.
- Probable date at which the brown rat first enters Britain.

== Publications ==
- Ephraim Chambers' Cyclopaedia, or Universal Dictionary of Arts and Sciences.
- James Gibbs' A Book of Architecture, containing designs of buildings and ornaments.
- Alexander Pope's satirical poem The Dunciad.
- Daniel Defoe's A Plan of the English Commerce.

== Births ==
- 9 January – Thomas Warton, poet (died 1790)
- 3 July – Robert Adam, architect (died 1792)
- 3 September – Matthew Boulton, manufacturer and engineer (died 1809)
- 27 October (O.S.) – James Cook, naval captain and explorer (died 1779)

== Deaths ==
- 3 April – James Anderson, Scottish lawyer, antiquary and historian (born 1662)

== See also ==
- 1728 in Wales
