= Owen Gruffydd =

Welsh poet

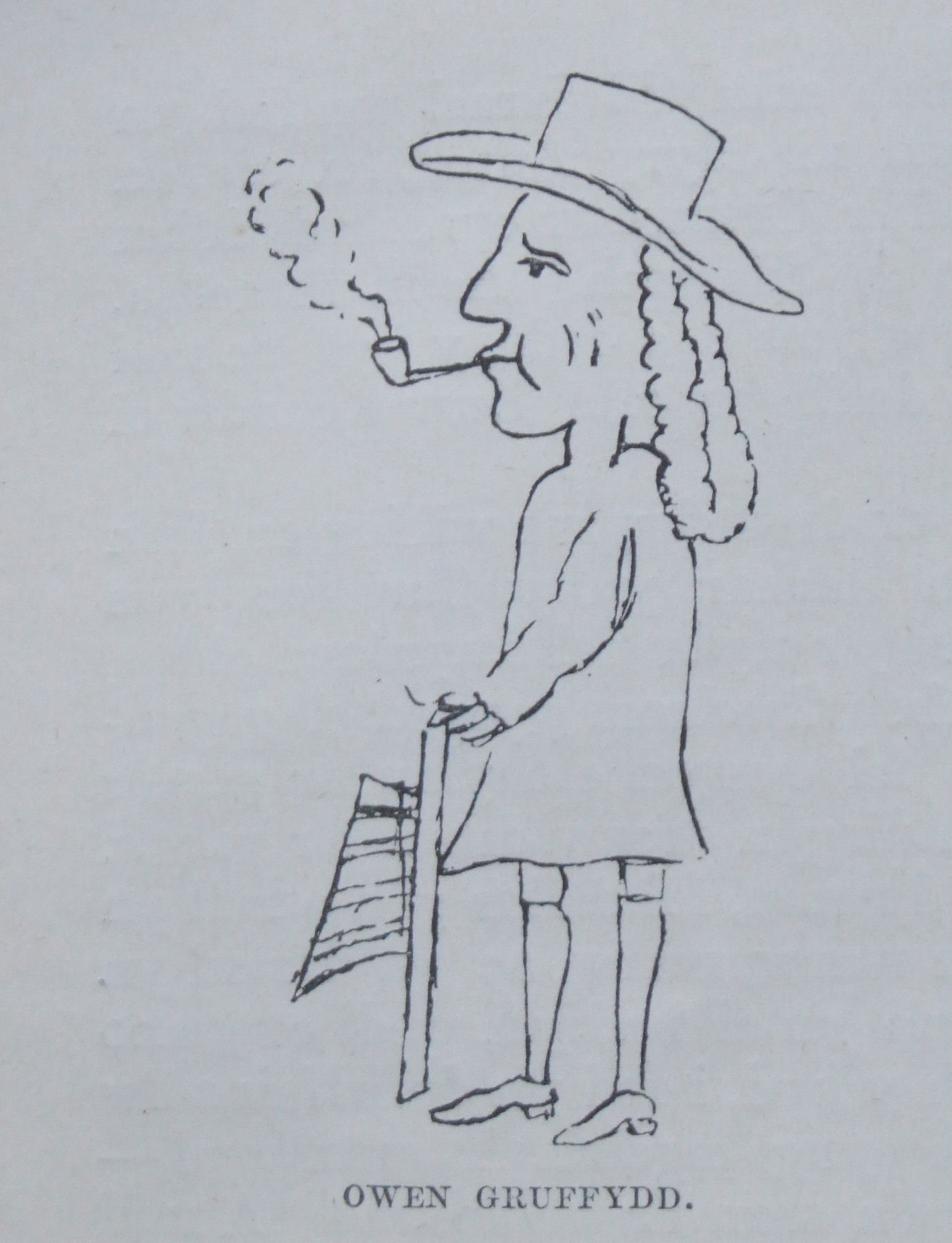
Contemporary caricature portrait of Welsh-language poet, antiquary and genealogist Owen Gruffydd (1643-1730). Reproduced from an early 18th century MS. in the literary journal Y Llenor (Book 2, 1895)

Owen Gruffydd (1643-1730) was a Welsh poet partly noted for a lament on the decline of the Welsh language in the early 18th century.

Not much is known about Owen Gruffydd's early life and career except that he was born in the parish of Llanystumdwy, Caernarfonshire. It is likely that he lived much of his life there and in the outlying parishes. Gruffydd was a weaver by profession. He was, however, known more for his poetic gifts. He also earned a name as a genealogist.

== Poems ==
Gruffydd's poems, generally in the strict metres, were mostly composed in honor of the aristocracy living in the surrounding countryside, and it has been suggested that he may have been the last Welsh poet to travel in search of aristocratic patronage in the manner which had sustained Welsh poets for centuries. He also wrote some other types poems which were more popular verse. An example of these were the carols for Christmastide. Selected works of Gruffydd were published in Carolau a Dyriau Duwiol (1688), in Blodeu Gerdd Cymry (1759) and in Gwaith Owen Gruffydd (1904), edited by O. M. Edwards. A large collection of his works is archived in the British Museum and the National Library of Wales.

== Later life ==
Gruffydd gradually lost his sight with old age and he dictated his verse to friends.
