= HMS Tartarus (1834) =

History

United Kingdom
- Name: Tartarus
- Namesake: Tartarus
- Ordered: 27 July 1833
- Builder: Pembroke Dockyard
- Laid down: September 1833
- Launched: 23 June 1834
- Completed: 3 October 1834
- Commissioned: 27 August 1834
- Fate: Broken up by 6 November 1860

General characteristics (as built)
- Class & type: Tartarus-class gunvessel
- Displacement: 560 long tons (570 t)
- Tons burthen: 523 24/94 bm
- Length: 145 ft (44.2 m) (Gun deck); 125 ft 6 in (38.3 m) (Keel)
- Beam: 28 ft 4 in (8.6 m)
- Draught: 10 ft 6 in (3.2 m)
- Depth: 14 ft 9 in (4.5 m)
- Installed power: 200 nhp
- Propulsion: 2 × Side-lever steam engines
- Complement: 80
- Armament: 2 × 9-pdr cannon

HMS Tartarus was a paddle steamer gunvessel, the name ship of her class, built for the Royal Navy during the 1830s.

== Description ==
Tartarus had a length at the gun deck of 145 feet (44.2 m) and 125 feet 6 inches (38.3 m) at the keel. She had a beam of 28 feet 4 inches (8.6 m), a draught of 10 feet 6 inches (3.2 m) and a depth of hold of 14 feet 9 inches (4.5 m). The ship's tonnage was 523 24/94 tons burthen and she displaced 560 long tons (570 t). The Tartarus class was initially armed with a pair of 9-pounder cannon, but these were later exchanged for a single 32-pounder smoothbore cannon on a pivot mount and a pair of 32-pounder carronades. The ships had a crew of 80 officers and ratings.

== Construction and career ==
Tartarus, the third ship of her name to serve in the Royal Navy, was ordered on 2 July 1833, laid down in September 1833 at Pembroke Dockyard, Wales, and launched on 23 June 1834. She was completed on 3 October 1834 at Woolwich Dockyard and commissioned on 27 August of the same year.
