= 1730 in Great Britain =

Events from the year 1730 in Great Britain.

== Incumbents ==
- Monarch – George II
- Prime Minister – Robert Walpole (Whig)

== Events ==
- 3 February – The Daily Advertiser is founded in London as the first newspaper funded by advertising.
- 12 March – John Glas deposed from the Church of Scotland; the Glasite sect forms around him.
- 15 May – Walpole–Townshend ministry dissolved when Charles Townshend, 2nd Viscount Townshend resigns as Secretary of State for the Northern Department after a dispute with Robert Walpole.

=== Undated ===
- The population of the UK exceeds 10 million for the first time.
- Reputedly the last originally native roe deer in England is killed at Hexham, Northumberland.

== Births ==
- 9 January – John Scott of Amwell, Quaker poet and landscape gardener (died 1783)
- 27 March – Thomas Tyrwhitt, classical scholar and critic (died 1786)
- 16 April – Henry Clinton, general (died 1795)
- 26 April – John Moore, Archbishop of Canterbury (died 1805)
- 13 May – Charles Watson-Wentworth, 2nd Marquess of Rockingham, Prime Minister (died 1782)
- 12 July – Josiah Wedgwood, pottery manufacturer and abolitionist (died 1795)
- 1 August – Frederick Hervey, 4th Earl of Bristol, Anglican Bishop of Derry, art collector and philanthropist (died 1803)
- 7 September – Elisabetta de Gambarini, composer (died 1765)
- 1 November – George Horne, bishop (died 1792)
- 14 December – James Bruce, Scottish explorer of the Nile (died 1794)
- 30 December – William Hamilton, diplomat and antiquary (died 1803)
- date unknown – John Murray, 4th Earl of Dunmore, Scottish peer and colonial governor in the Americas (died 1809)

== Deaths ==
- 1 January – Daniel Finch, 2nd Earl of Nottingham, politician (born 1647)
- 13 May – Sir Justinian Isham, 4th Baronet, landowner and politician (born 1658)
- 30 May – Arabella Churchill, mistress of King James II (born 1648)
- 19 June – Thomas Trevor, 1st Baron Trevor, judge and politician (born 1658)
- 9 September – Charles FitzRoy, 2nd Duke of Cleveland, courtier (born 1662)
- 27 September – Laurence Eusden, poet laureate (born 1688)
- 23 October – Anne Oldfield, actress (born 1683)

== See also ==
- 1730 in Wales
