= 1733 in Great Britain =

Events from the year 1733 in Great Britain.

== Incumbents ==
- Monarch – George II
- Prime Minister – Robert Walpole (Whig)

== Events ==
- 23 January – first performance of George Frideric Handel's opera Orlando, at the His Majesty's Theatre in London.
- 12 February – British colonist James Oglethorpe founds Savannah, Georgia.
- 25 March – English replaces Latin and Law French as the official language of English and Scottish courts on coming into effect of the Proceedings in Courts of Justice Act 1730.
- 6 April – after Prime Minister Robert Walpole's proposed excise tax bill to replace tariffs on wine and tobacco results in rioting over the imposition of additional taxes and the use of government agents to collect them, Walpole informs the House of Commons that he will withdraw the legislation.
- 17 May – the Molasses Act becomes law: intended to regulate the colonial molasses trade in favour of the British West Indies, it causes resentment in British North America.
- 26 May – John Kay patents the flying shuttle.
- 7 November – France and Spain sign the treaty of Escurial and form an alliance against Britain.
- Undated – with an average Central England temperature of 10.50 °C or 50.90 °F, this is the hottest calendar year for which reliable records exist until being exceeded in 1834.

== Births ==
- 13 February – Alexander Wedderburn, 1st Earl of Rosslyn, Lord Chancellor (died 1805)
- 13 March – Joseph Priestley, scientist and minister (died 1804)
- 27 July – Jeremiah Dixon, surveyor and astronomer (died 1779)
- Elizabeth Raffald, née Whitaker, cookery writer and entrepreneur (died 1781)

== Deaths ==
- 21 January – Bernard Mandeville, economic philosopher (born 1670 in the Dutch Republic)
- 25 January – Gilbert Heathcote, Mayor of London (born 1652)
- 27 January – Thomas Woolston, theologian (born 1668)
- 19 April – Elizabeth Villiers, mistress of William III of England (born 1657)
- 10 May – Barton Booth, actor (born 1681)
- 16 August – Matthew Tindal, deist (born 1657)

== See also ==
- 1733 in Wales
