= James Erskine, Lord Alva =

Scottish lawyer (1722–1796)

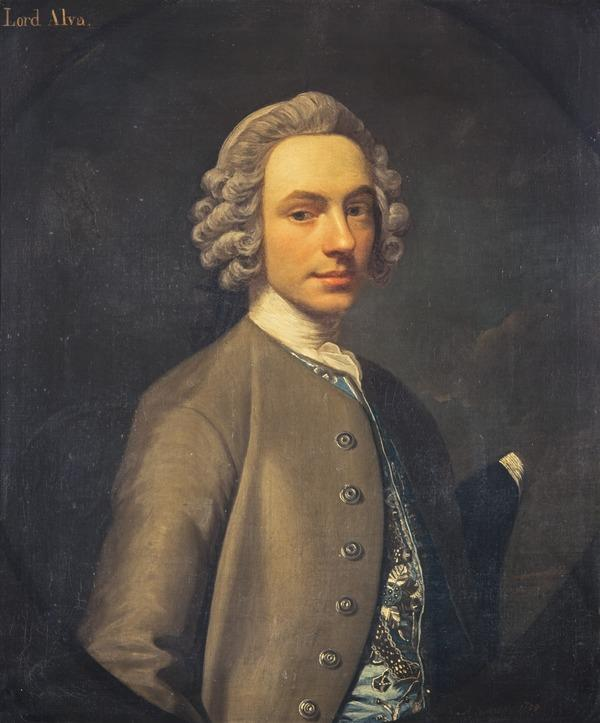
James Erskine, Lord Barjarg and Alva

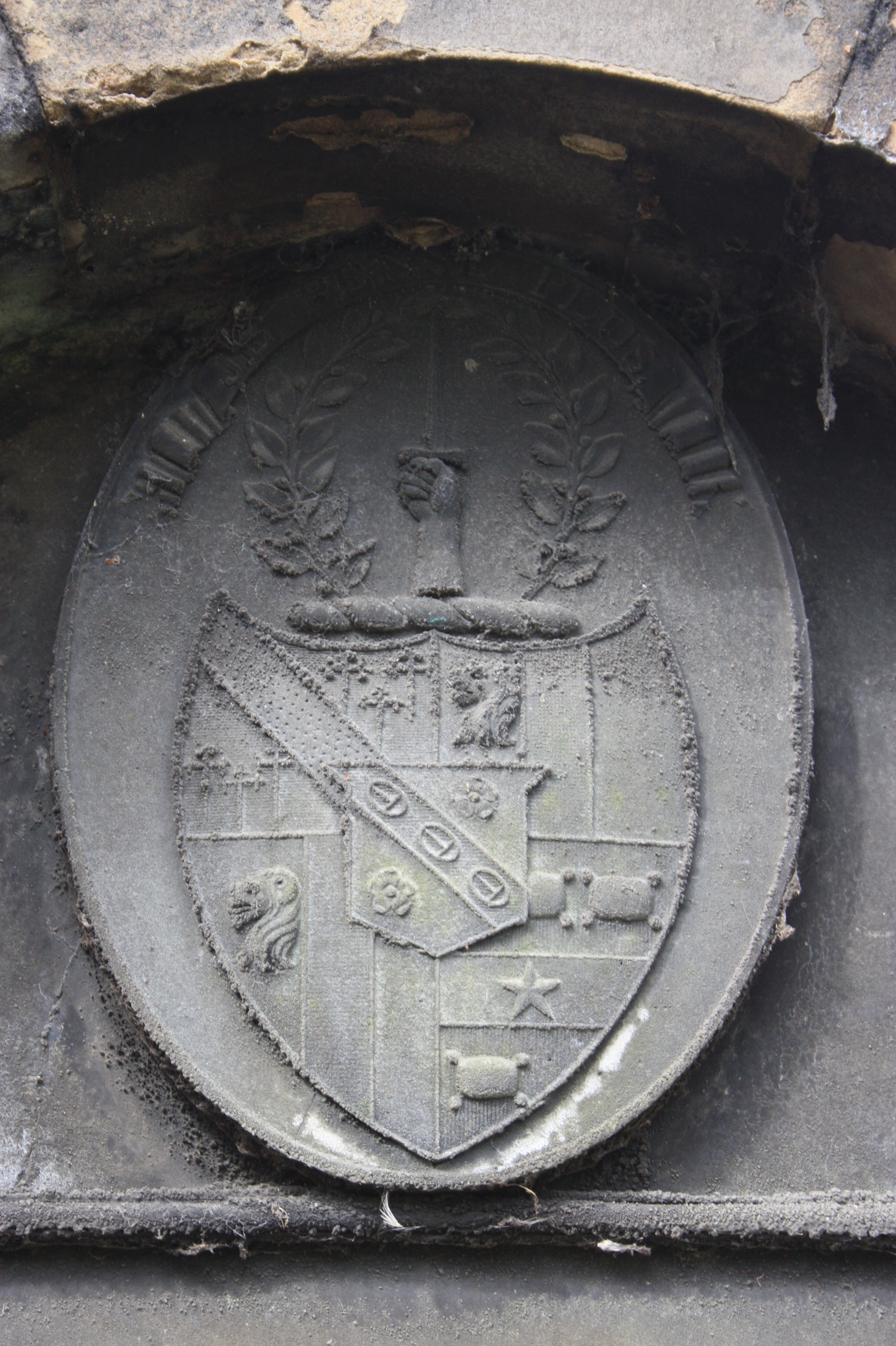
The coat of arms of James Erskine, Lord Alva

James Erskine, Lord Barjarg and Alva (20 June 1722 – 13 May 1796) was an 18th-century Scottish lawyer who rose to be a Senator of the College of Justice. For convenience his name was usually contracted to James Erskine, Lord Alva.

== Life ==
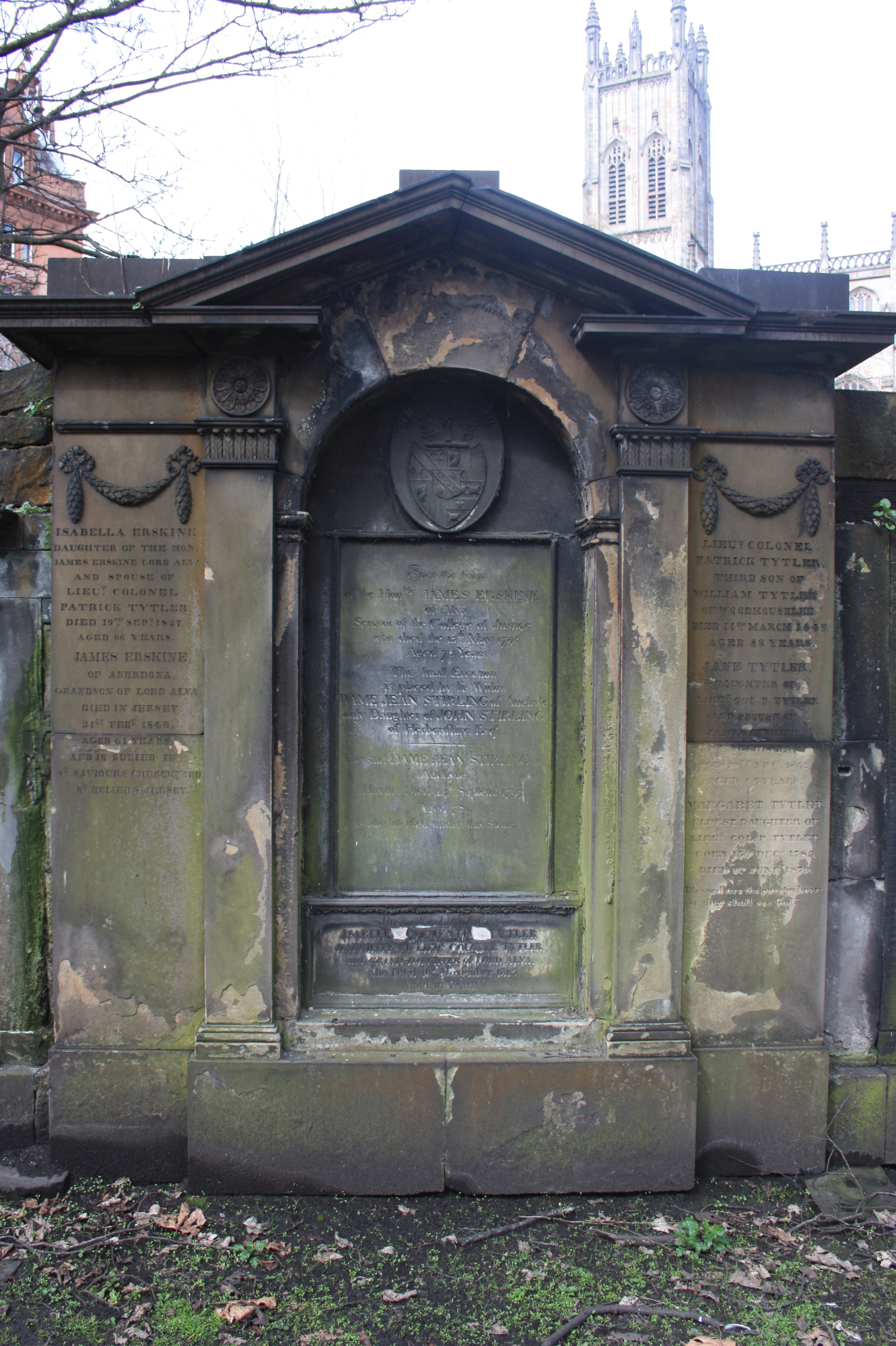
The grave of James Erskine, Lord Alva, St Cuthberts Churchyard, Edinburgh

He was born in Edinburgh, the son of Charles Erskine, Lord Tinwald, Lord Justice Clerk of Scotland, and his wife, Grisel Grierson.

He became an advocate in 1743 and made Sheriff-Depute of Perthshire in 1748. In 1754 he became a Baron of the Exchequer and in 1758 Knight Marshal of Scotland. In 1761 he replaced Patrick Boyle, Lord Shewalton as a Senator of the College of Justice.

On the death of his father in 1763 he inherited both his Edinburgh property, Drumsheugh House, and Alva House in Clackmannanshire.

In 1772, he changed his title to Lord Alva when he inherited the estate of the Erskines of Alva, Clackmannanshire. He lived at Drumsheugh House in western Edinburgh. In 1758, he was appointed Knight Marischal.

He died on 13 May 1796 at Drumsheugh House in western Edinburgh and was buried in St Cuthberts Churchyard. The grave lies on the first dividing wall north of the church, just west of the large monument to Alexander Murray, Lord Henderland.

His place as Senator was filled by Robert Cullen, Lord Cullen.

Drumsheugh House was demolished around 1860 to build the link road between the Moray Estate and the Haymarket area, now called Drumsheugh Gardens.

== Family ==
He was married to Jean Stirling (1719–1797), daughter of John Stirling of Herbertshire.

Their daughter, Isabella Erskine (d.1827), married Lt Col Patrick Tytler, son of Lord Alva's legal colleague, William Tytler and grandson of Alexander Fraser Tytler.

His older brother was Charles Erskine (1716–1749) but as Charles died before the father he inherited neither title nor land.
