= William Gambold =

- Born: 10 August 1672; Cardigan, Wales
- Died: 13 September 1728 (aged 56)
- Occupations: Grammarian, lexicographer
- Children: John Gambold

Reverend William Gambold (10 August 1672 – 13 September 1728) was a Welsh clergyman and grammarian.

== Early life ==
William Gambold was born on 10 August 1672 in Cardigan.

== Education ==
William Gambold matriculated at St Mary Hall, Oxford on 23 May 1693, but then transferred to Exeter College in 1694, where he trained for the Church. At Oxford, he became friends with Edward Lhuyd.

== Career ==
=== Clergyman ===
In November 1707, he opened a charity school in Llanychaer, Pembrokeshire, and ran it until 1709.

On 1 December 1709, he became rector of Puncheston with Llanychaer, Pembrokeshire. He retired from parochial work when he became disabled after an accident.

=== Grammarian ===
Gambold spent 15 years working on an English and Welsh Dictionary. Originally the dictionary also included Latin, but this was dropped. He finished the dictionary in 1722, but failed to get the money necessary to publish it. It is now in the Nationary Library of Wales.

In 1727, William Gambold published A Grammar of the Welsh Language.

== Personal life ==
Gambold married Elizabeth and had four sons, including John Gambold (1711 – 1771), and a daughter.

Gambold died on 13 September 1728.

== Legacy ==
In 1972, for the Haverfordwest Eisteddfod, a memorial to Gambold was unveiled at St Mary’s Church, Puncheston, by a family member from Coatesville, Indiana.
