= John Sinclair, Lord Murkle =

Scottish judge

John Sinclair, Lord Murkle (died 5 June 1755) was a Scottish judge.

A son of John Sinclair, 8th Earl of Caithness and Janet Carmichael of the Hyndford family, he was admitted to the Faculty of Advocates on 7 February 1713. On 18 January 1721 he was appointed one of the Solicitors General for Scotland. He was elevated to the bench on the death of Sir William Calderwood of Polton on 3 November 1733, with the judicial title Lord Murkle. He died in Edinburgh on 5 June 1755.

Legal offices
Preceded by Walter Stewart	Solicitor General for Scotland; 1721–1733	Succeeded by Charles Binning
