= James Erskine, Lord Grange =

Scottish advocate, judge and politician

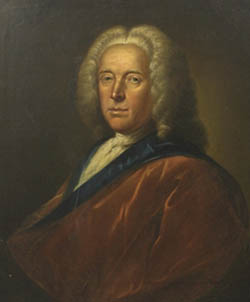
James Erskine (circa 1750)

James Erskine, Lord Grange (1679 – 20 January 1754) was a Scottish advocate, judge and politician. He served as Lord Justice Clerk and a Lord of Justiciary.

== Life ==
The son of Charles Erskine, Earl of Mar, by his spouse Lady Mary, eldest daughter of George Maule, 2nd Earl of Panmure, he was also brother of John Erskine, 6th Earl of Mar. Educated as an advocate, he was raised to the bench on 18 October 1706. He was nominated a Lord of Justiciary in place of David Home, Lord Crocerig on 6 June the same year, and took the title Lord Grange. On 27 July 1710 he succeeded Adam Cockburn of Ormiston as Lord Justice Clerk.

He took no part in the Jacobite rising of 1715, although there is little doubt that at times he was in communication with the Jacobites; but was rather known for his piety and for his sympathy with the Presbyterians.

In 1724 he, and David Erskine, Lord Dun purchased the forfeited Earldom of Mar from the government, which they promptly reorganised, and sold off.

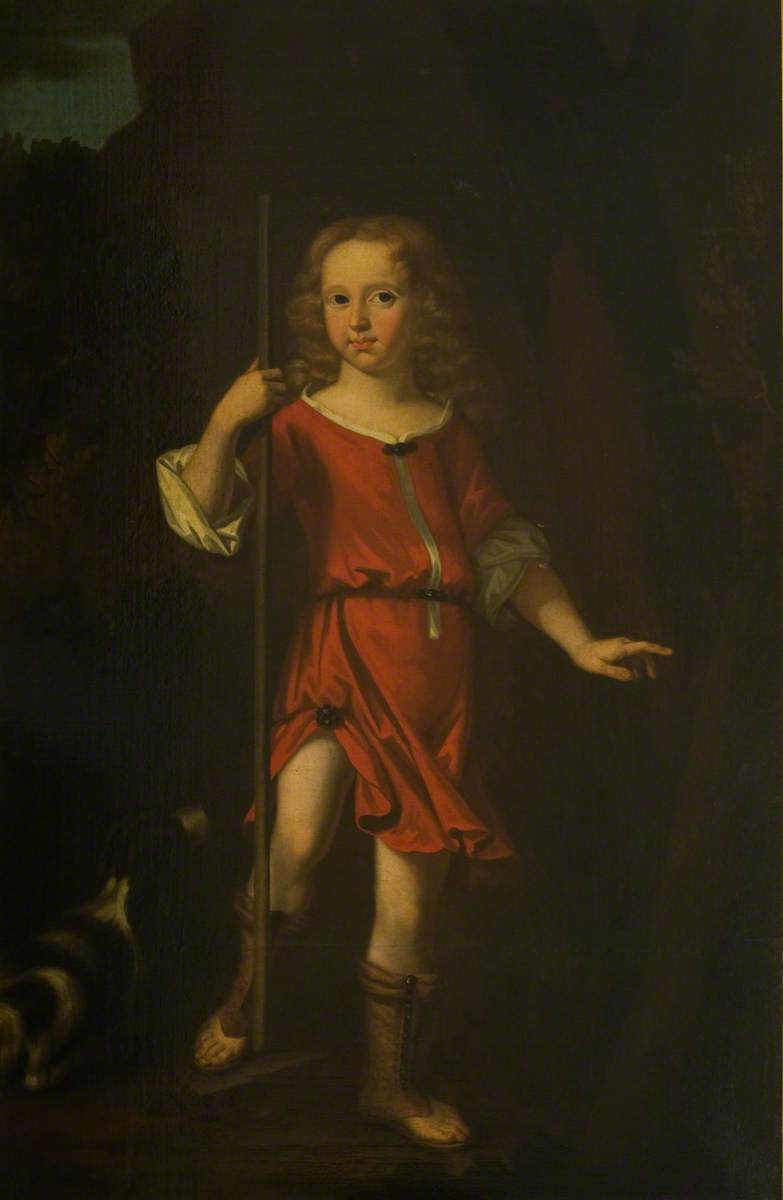
Portrait of James Erskine as a boy, painted by John Scougall

His wife, Rachel Chiesley, suspected her husband of infidelity, and after some years of unhappiness Grange arranged a plan for her abduction. In January 1732 she was taken in secret from Edinburgh to the Monach Islands for two years, thence Hirta in St Kilda, where she remained for about ten years. From there, she was taken to Assynt in Sutherland, and finally to Skye. To complete the idea that she was dead her funeral was publicly celebrated, but she survived until May 1745. Erskine himself was a "singular compound of good and bad qualities". In addition to his legal career he was elected to Parliament in 1734 and he survived the vicissitudes of the Jacobite rebellions unscathed. He was a philanderer and over-partial to claret, whilst at the same time deeply religious. This last quality would have been instrumental in any decision not to have his wife assassinated, and he did not marry his long-term mistress Fanny Lindsay until after he had heard of the first Lady Grange's death.

Meanwhile, in 1734 Grange resigned his offices in the Court of Session and Justiciary, and became a Member of Parliament where he was a bitter opponent of Sir Robert Walpole. His objective of being appointed Secretary of State for Scotland was a failure. For a short time after leaving parliament he returned to the Bar.

Erskine stood in opposition to the Witchcraft Act 1735, which – unlike previous laws – did not assume that witches actually existed and made pacts with Satan, but rather assumed that anyone who claimed to be actually practising witchcraft was a cheater seeking to defraud people. The only figure to offer significant opposition to the Act was Erskine. Erskine not only fervently believed in the existence of witchcraft, but, it has been argued, also held beliefs that were deeply rooted in "Scottish political and religious considerations" and which caused him to reject the Act. His objection to the Act "marked him out as an eccentric verging on the insane" among Members of Parliament, and in turn his political opponents would use it against him; one of his staunchest critics, Robert Walpole, who was then the de facto Prime Minister of the country, allegedly stating that he no longer considered Erskine to be a serious political threat as a result of his embarrassing opposition to the Act.

His Edinburgh mansion was on the east side of Niddry Wynd (later replaced by Niddry Street) off the Royal Mile.

He died in London on 20 January 1754, aged 75 years.

== Family ==
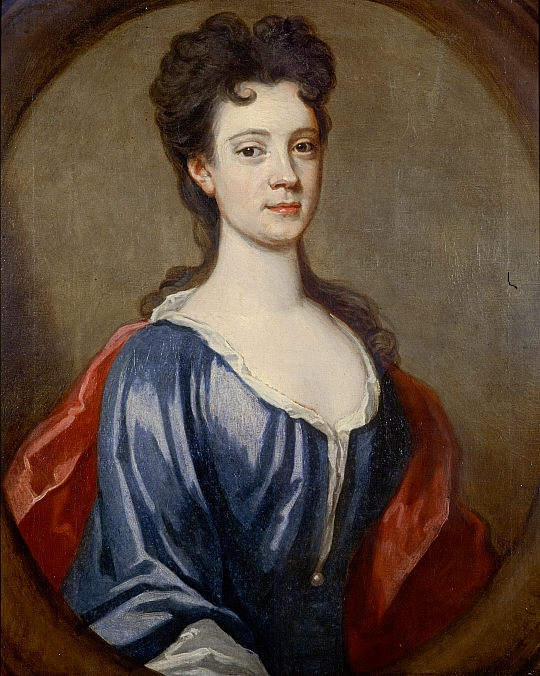
Lady Grange

He married Rachel Chiesley, daughter of John Chiesley, who murdered George Lockhart, Lord Carnwath in 1689. Rachel was thereafter raised by her uncle Robert Chieslie, Lord Provost of Edinburgh. Rachel had inherited a fortune paid in compensation to her uncles Robert and James who each lost a fortune in the Darien scheme, but who were posthumously compensated in the Act of Union 1707.

== In fiction ==
James Erskine, Lord Grange, features as a character in Andrew Drummond's fantasy novel. The Books of the Incarceration of the Lady Grange (2016).

== Sources ==
- Davies, Owen (1999). Witchcraft, Magic and Culture 1736-1951. Manchester and New York: Manchester University Press. ISBN 978-0-7190-5656-7.

Parliament of Great Britain
Preceded by Sir John Shaw (until 1727)	Member of Parliament for Clackmannanshire; 1734–1741	Succeeded by Thomas Erskine (from 1747)
Preceded by Peter Halkett	Member of Parliament for Stirling Burghs; 1741–1747	Succeeded by George Haldane
Legal offices
Preceded by Lord Ormiston	Lord Justice Clerk; 1710–1714	Succeeded by Lord Ormiston
