= Charles Erskine, Lord Tinwald =

Scottish judge and politician

Charles Erskine
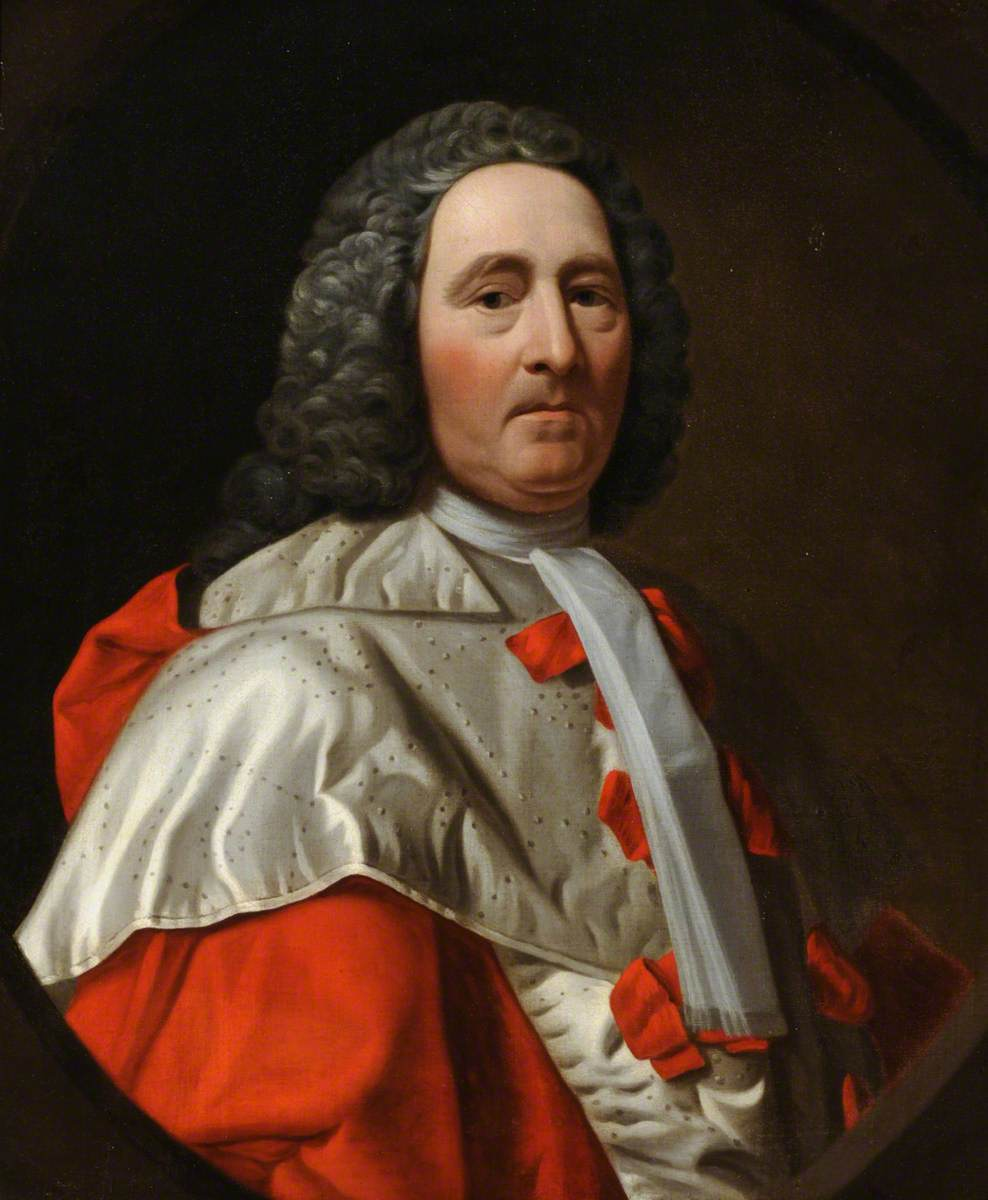
- Portrait of Erskine, 1750

Lord Justice Clerk
- In office 1748–1763
- Preceded by: Andrew Fletcher
- Succeeded by: Gilbert Elliot

Lord Advocate
- In office 1737–1742
- Preceded by: Duncan Forbes
- Succeeded by: Robert Craigie

Solicitor General for Scotland
- In office 1725–1737
- Preceded by: Charles Binning
- Succeeded by: William Grant

Personal details
- Born: 1680
- Died: 5 April 1763 (aged 82–83) Edinburgh, Scotland, Great Britain
- Spouse(s): Grizel Grierson (m. 1712, divorced) Elizabeth Maxwell
- Children: Charles and James
- Parent(s): Charles Erskine; Christian Dundas

Charles Erskine also spelled Areskine (1680 – 5 April 1763), of Tinwald and Barjarg, Dumfries, and Alva, Clackmannan was Lord Advocate, a Scottish judge, and a politician who sat in the House of Commons from 1722 to 1742.

== Life ==
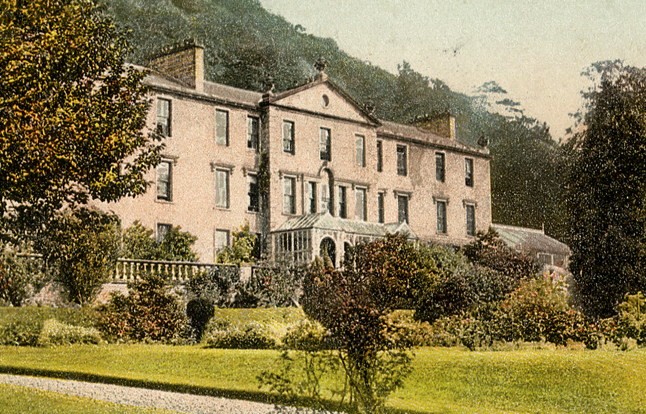
Alva House early 20th c postcard

Erskine was the fourth son of Charles Erskine of Alva, Clackmannanshire and his wife Christian Dundas, daughter of James Dundas. His older brothers included Robert Erskine, physician to Peter the Great.

He was educated at the High School of Edinburgh and studied law at the University of Edinburgh from 1693. At the age of 20, he was a candidate for the office of one of the four Regents of the University of Edinburgh, and after an examination with several competitors obtained that appointment on 26 November 1700 until 17 October 1707. On 7 November 1707, he was appointed the first Professor of Public Law at the University, despite the protests of the council. He was at Utrecht around 1710 and became a member of the Faculty of Advocates on 14 July 1711.

Erskine was elected Member of Parliament for Dumfriesshire in 1722, 1727, and 1734, for the Dumfries Burghs in 1734, for the Tain Burghs in 1741. He was Solicitor General for Scotland from 2 June 1725, Lord Advocate from 20 January 1737 to 1742. He was raised as a Lord of Justiciary, and also to the bench on 23 November 1744 as Lord Tinwald. He was also Lord Justice Clerk from 15 June 1748 until his death.

In 1749, he purchased Alva House from his nephew and enlarged and remodelled the property. His Edinburgh property at this time (required to attend the Edinburgh courts) was at Mylne's Square, opposite the Tron Kirk 200m east of the courts.

In 1755, he purchased Drumsheugh House west of Edinburgh. He commissioned James Adam to extend the property and refront in a more modern idiom. The house was two storey and basement in form. The house was demolished to create Drumsheugh Place.

== Family ==
He married Grizel Grierson, daughter of John Grierson of Barjarg on 21 December 1712, through whom he inherited Barjarg Tower.

Erskine married as his second wife Elizabeth Maxwell, widow of Dr William Maxwell of Preston, Lancashire, and daughter of William Harestanes of Craigs, Kirkcudbright on 26 August 1753. He died in Edinburgh on 5 April 1763 leaving two sons by his first wife:

- Charles Erskine (1716–1749) - a lawyer, and MP for Ayr Burghs from 1747 to 1749.
- James Erskine, Lord Alva (1722 – 1796)

Erskine's brother John Erskine was also an MP.

== Ancestry ==
Ancestors of Charles Erskine, Lord Tinwald

Charles Erskine
Charles Erskine
Thomas Hope
Mary Hope
Elizabeth Bennet
Charles Erskine
James Dundas
James Dundas
Christian Dundas
George Home
Marie Home
Jean Haldane

== In fiction ==
Charles Erskine, Lord Tinwald, features as a character in Andrew Drummond's fantasy novel, The Books of the Incarceration of the Lady Grange (2016).

Parliament of Great Britain
Preceded by Sir William Johnstone, 2nd Bt	Member of Parliament for Dumfriesshire; 1722–1741	Succeeded by Sir John Douglas, 3rd Bt
Preceded by Archibald Douglas	Member of Parliament for Dumfries Burghs; 1734	Succeeded by William Kirkpatrick
Preceded by Sir Robert Munro, 6th Bt	Member of Parliament for Tain Burghs; 1734–1742	Succeeded by Robert Craigie
Legal offices
Preceded by Charles Binning	Solicitor General for Scotland; 1725–1737	Succeeded by William Grant
Preceded by Duncan Forbes	Lord Advocate; 1737–1742	Succeeded by Robert Craigie
Preceded by Andrew Fletcher	Lord Justice Clerk; 1748–1763	Succeeded by Sir Gilbert Eliot of Minto
