= Hew Dalrymple, Lord North Berwick =

Scottish judge and politician

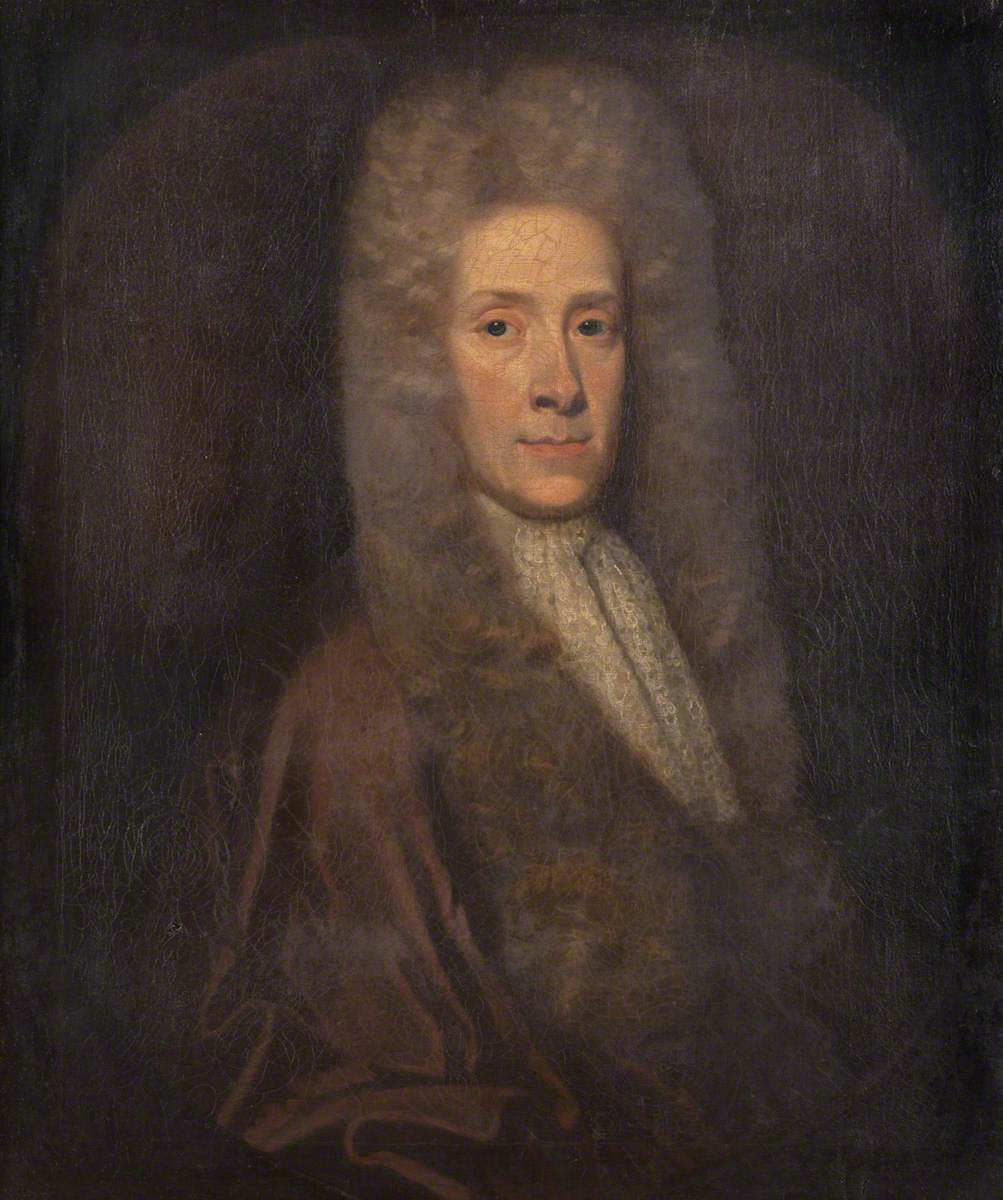
Portrait attributed to Henry Alexander, 1737

Sir Hew Dalrymple, Lord North Berwick (1652–1737) was a Scottish judge and politician.

The third son of James Dalrymple, 1st Viscount of Stair, he was Commissary of Edinburgh; Commissioner to the Parliament of Scotland for New Galloway burgh from 1690, and for North Berwick burgh from 1702. His two elder brothers were John Dalrymple, 1st Earl of Stair and Sir James Dalrymple, 1st Baronet of Cranstoun and a younger brother was Sir David Dalrymple, 1st Baronet of Hailes. He was a supporter of the Court interest.

In 1681, Dalrymple became an investor in the New Mills cloth manufactory in Haddingtonshire. On 3rd April 1696 he was elected to the court of directors of the Company of Scotland trading to Africa and the Indies.

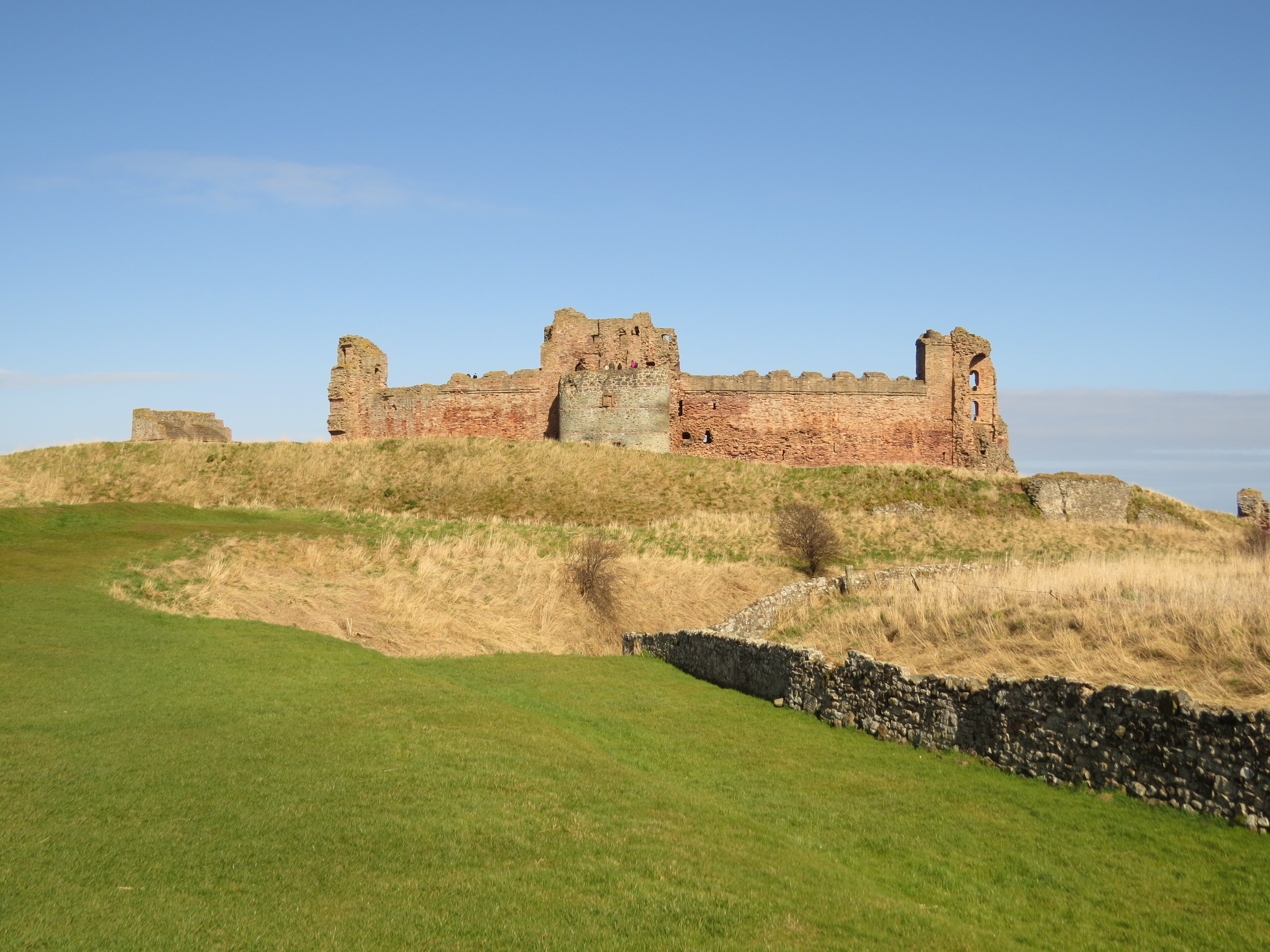
Tantallon Castle

Dalrymple was Dean of the Faculty of Advocates from 1695. He was created a baronet in the baronetage of Nova Scotia in 1698 and succeeded his father in the same year as Lord President of the Court of Session, taking the judicial title Lord North Berwick. He held this post until his death. He was a Commissioner for the articles of union between England and Scotland in 1702 and 1703. He planted the Act of Union Beech trees to commemorate the event and six of these survive to this day (2009).

In 1699 Dalrymple bought the barony and Castle of Tantallon from James Douglas, 2nd Marquess of Douglas, but allowed the castle to fall into further ruin.

He married twice, to Marion Hamilton and Elizabeth Dundas and had a large family. His second son Sir Hew Dalrymple became a Lord of Session as Lord Drummore.

He was succeeded in the baronetcy by his grandson Sir Hew Dalrymple, 2nd Baronet of Castleton, his eldest son Sir Robert Dalrymple having predeceased him in 1734.

Legal offices
Preceded by Viscount Stair	Lord President of the Court of Session; 1698–1737	Succeeded by Duncan Forbes
Baronetage of Nova Scotia
New creation	Baronet (of North Berwick); 1697–1737	Succeeded by Hew Dalrymple
