= Rowland (surname) =

Rowland is an English surname.

== Notable people with the surname "Rowland" include ==
=== A ===
- Adele Rowland (1883–1971), American actress
- Albert Rowland (1885–1918), New Zealand race walker
- Alf Rowland (1920–1997), English footballer
- Alfred Rowland (1844–1898), American politician
- Alice Rowland (1894–1971), American politician
- Andy Rowland (footballer, born 1954) (1954–2024), English footballer
- Andy Rowland (footballer, born 1965) (born 1965), English footballer
- Austen Rowland (born 1981), American basketball player

=== B ===
- Barrington Rowland (born 1980), Indian cricketer
- Barry Rowland (born 1961), British administrator
- Bart Rowland (born 1977), American politician
- Beryl Rowland (1918–2003), Scottish-Canadian scholar
- Bo Rowland (1903–1964), American football coach
- Brad Rowland (born 1928), American football player
- Brian Rowland (born 1980), Canadian soccer player
- Bruce Rowland (composer) (born 1942), Australian composer
- Bruce Rowland (drummer) (1941–2015), English drummer

=== C ===
- Cameron Rowland (born 1988), American artist
- Caroline Rowland (disambiguation), multiple people
- Cathy Rowland (born 1950), American model
- Charles H. Rowland (1860–1921), American politician
- Chris Rowland (born 1997), American football player
- Christopher Rowland (1929–1967), British politician
- Christopher Rowland (theologian) (born 1947), English priest
- Chuck Rowland (1899–1992), American baseball player
- Craig Rowland (born 1971), Australian squash player
- Cyril Rowland (1905–1971), Welsh cricketer

=== D ===
- Daniel Rowland (disambiguation), multiple people
- David Rowland (disambiguation), multiple people
- Dennis Rowland (born 1948), American singer
- Derrick Rowland (born 1959), American basketball player
- Diana Rowland, American writer
- Diana K. Rowland, American skydiver
- Dick Rowland (1902–??), American shoeshiner
- Donna Rowland (born 1969), American politician
- Doug Rowland (born 1940), Canadian politician
- Dunbar Rowland (1864–1937), American historian

=== E ===
- Edwin Lionel Rowland (Eddie Roberts) (boxer) (1903–1968) Boxer, actor
- Edward Fraser Rowland (1911–2004), Canadian miner and politician
- E. J. Rowland (born 1983), American-Bulgarian basketball player
- Elden Rowland (1915–1982), American artist
- Enda Rowland (born 1995), Irish hurler
- Ernest Rowland (1864–1940), Welsh rugby union footballer
- Eron Rowland (1861–1851), American historian
- Essie Wick Rowland (1871–1957), American socialite

=== F ===
- Frederick Rowland (1874–1959), English politician
- Frank Rowland (cricketer) (1892–1957), Australian cricketer
- Frank L. Rowland (1891–1949), American politician from Maryland
- F. Sherwood Rowland (1927–2012), American chemist

=== G ===
- Geoffrey Rowland, English politician
- Gilbert Rowland, (born 1946), Scottish harpsichordist
- Gord Rowland (1930–2018), Canadian soccer player and gridiron football player
- Guy Rowland (born 1964), English cyclist

=== H ===
- Helen Rowland (1875–1950), American journalist
- Helen Rowland (actress) (1918/1919-?), American actress
- Helena Rowland (born 1999), English rugby union footballer
- Henry Rowland (disambiguation), multiple people
- Herb Rowland (1911–1995), Canadian wrestler

=== I ===
- Ian Rowland (born 1961), English writer
- Ian Rowland (footballer) (born 1941), Australian rules footballer

=== J ===
- Jacky Rowland, English broadcaster
- Jada Rowland (born 1943), American illustrator
- James Rowland (disambiguation), multiple people
- Jason Rowland (born 1970), British boxer
- Jeff Rowland (disambiguation), multiple people
- Jeffrey Rowland (born 1974), American author
- Jenny Rowland (born 1974), American gymnastics coach
- John Rowland (disambiguation), multiple people
- Josh Rowland (born 1988), New Zealand rugby union footballer
- J. Roy Rowland (1926–2022), American politician and physician
- Julie Rowland, New Zealand structural geologist
- Justin Rowland (born 1937), American football player

=== K ===
- Kate Mason Rowland (1840–1916), American author
- Keith Rowland (born 1971), Northern Irish footballer
- Kelly Rowland (born 1981), American singer-songwriter
- Kevin Rowland (born 1953), English singer-songwriter

=== L ===
- Landon H. Rowland (1937–2015), American railway executive
- Laura Joh Rowland, American writer
- Len Rowland (1925–2014), English footballer
- Leonard Rowland (1862–1939), Welsh politician
- Levi L. Rowland (1831–1809), American educator
- Lewis Rowland (1925–2017), American neurologist
- Lloyd Rowland, American intelligence officer
- Lorna Rowland (1908–1988), English journalist
- Lyle Rowland (born 1954), American politician

=== M ===
- Mabel Rowland (1879–1943), American actress
- Marcus Rowland (disambiguation), multiple people
- Mark Rowland (born 1963), British athlete
- Mary M. Rowland (born 1961), American judge
- Melissa Rowland (born 1989), Australian netball player
- Michael Rowland (disambiguation), multiple people
- Michelle Rowland (born 1971), Australian politician
- Mitch Rowland (born 1988), American songwriter

=== O ===
- Oliver Rowland (born 1992), British racing driver

=== P ===
- Pants Rowland (1879–1969), American baseball manager
- Pleasant Rowland (born 1941), American educator

=== R ===
- Rebecca Rowland, American author
- Rich Rowland (born 1964), American baseball player
- Richard Rowland (disambiguation), multiple people
- Robert Rowland (politician) (1966–2021), British politician
- Robert R. Rowland (1917–2003), American general
- Robin Rowland (disambiguation), multiple people
- Rodney Rowland (born 1964), American actor
- Roger Rowland (1935–2011), British actor
- Rory Rowland, American politician
- Ross Rowland (1940–2025), American preservationist
- Roy Rowland (film director) (1910–1995), American film director

=== S ===
- Steve Rowland (disambiguation), multiple people
- Sydney Domville Rowland (1872–1917), English physician

=== T ===
- Thomas F. Rowland (1831–1907), American engineer and shipbuilder
- Tiny Rowland (1917–1998), British businessman
- Toby Rowland (??–1994), American impresario
- Tom Rowland (American football) (born 1945), American football player
- Tom Rowland (politician), American politician
- Tommy Rowland, American football player
- Tracey Rowland (born 1963), Australian theologian
- Tyler Rowland (born 1999), Canadian rugby union footballer

=== V ===
- Victoria Rowland, Australian actress

=== W ===
- Wade Rowland (born 1944), Canadian author
- Wick Rowland, American television executive
- Wirt C. Rowland (1887–1946), American architect

== See also ==
- Roland (disambiguation), a disambiguation page for "Roland"
- Rowland (disambiguation), a disambiguation page for "Rowland"
- Rowland (given name), a page for people with the given name "Rowland"
