= Rowlands =

Rowlands is a surname, and may refer to:

- Anna Rowlands (born 1975), British theologian and academic
- Clive Rowlands, Welsh rugby player and coach
- David Rowlands (disambiguation), multiple people
- Gena Rowlands, American actress (1930–2024)
- Graham Rowlands, Australian poet
- Hugh Rowlands, Captain in the British Army and recipient of the Victoria Cross
- Jim Rowlands, Welsh singer based in France
- John Rowlands (disambiguation), multiple people
- June Rowlands, Canadian politician and first female mayor of Toronto
- Keith Rowlands, Welsh international rugby player and administrator
- Mark Rowlands, Welsh writer, philosopher, and university professor
- Martin Rowlands, English-born Irish footballer
- Patsy Rowlands, English actress
- Richard Rowlands, Anglo-Dutch antiquary, publisher, humorist and translator
- Samuel Rowlands, English pamphleter of the 17th century societey
- Ted Rowlands, Baron Rowlands, Welsh Labour politician
- William Bowen Rowlands, 19th century British politician
- William Penfro Rowlands, composer of the hymn tune Blaenwern

== See also ==
- Rowland (disambiguation)
- Roelands, a town in Western Australia
- Rolands, a given name
