= Henry Rowland =

Henry Rowland may refer to:

- Henry Augustus Rowland (1848–1901), American physicist
- Henry Augustus Rowland (minister) (1804–1859), American minister
- Henry Rowland (actor) (1913–1984), American actor
- Henry C. Rowland (1874–1933), surgeon and writer

== See also ==
- Henry Rowland-Brown (1865–1921), English entomologist
- Henry Rowlands (1655–1723), author
