= Rowland =

Rowland may refer to:

== Places ==
=== United States ===
- Rowland Heights, California, an unincorporated community in Los Angeles County
- Rowland, Kentucky, an unincorporated community
- Rowland Township, Michigan
- Rowland, Missouri, an unincorporated community
- Rowland Township, North Carolina
  - Rowland, North Carolina, a town
- Rowland, Nevada, a ghost town
- Rowland, Oregon, a ghost town

=== Elsewhere ===
- Rowland, Derbyshire, England, a village and civil parish
- Rowland (crater), on the Moon

== People ==
- Rowland (given name), people so named
- Rowland (surname), people so named

== Other ==
- The title character of Childe Rowland, a fairy tale by Joseph Jacobs, based on a Scottish ballad
- Rowland Institute for Science, now part of Harvard University
- Rowland Theater, Pittsburgh, Pennsylvania, United States

== See also ==
- Rowland House (disambiguation)
- Rowland Park (disambiguation)
- Roland (disambiguation)
- Rowlands
- Rowlan
