= Ó Rothláin =

Irish surname

Ó Rothláin Rowlan, Rowland, Rowlands, Rollan, Rollin, Rolan, Rowley
- Map of Connacht, c. tenth century
- Parent family: Uí Fiachrach
- Place of origin: Connacht, Ireland
- Titles: Chieftains of the Principality of Coolcarney

Ó Rothláin (/oʊ ˈroʊlɔːn/ oh-ROH-lawn) is an Irish surname of Gaelic origin. It is a patronym meaning "descendant of Rothlán." The name is historically associated with a sept of the Uí Fiachrach in western Connacht, particularly in present-day County Mayo and County Sligo.

The surname represents the pre-anglicised Irish form of several modern surnames, including Rowlan, Rowland, Rowlands, Rollan, Rollin, Rolan, and Rowley.

The Irish scholar John O'Donovan noted in the 19th century that the name was "now always anglicised Rowley."

Alternative spellings include Ó Rothlán, Ó Rothlain, O'Rothlain, and Rothlan.

== Etymology ==
The surname Ó Rothláin derives from the personal name Rothlán. The prefix Ó denotes "descendant of" or "grandson of," a standard feature of Gaelic patronymic surnames.

The meaning of the personal name Rothlán is uncertain. The first element is generally associated with Old Irish roth, meaning "wheel" or "disc," derived from Proto-Celtic *rotos.

In early Irish society, the concept of the wheel was closely associated with chariot warfare (carbad), which formed an important part of elite martial culture.

While the precise interpretation of the compound remains unclear, the name has been interpreted as reflecting symbolic or aspirational qualities consistent with early Irish naming traditions.

== Pronunciation and anglicisation ==
The pronunciation of Ó Rothláin reflects features of Connacht Irish. The prefix Ó is pronounced as a long "oh," while the lenited consonants in Rothláin soften the medial sounds, producing an approximate pronunciation of "Oh ROH-lawn".

During the early modern period, Gaelic surnames were rendered into English forms by administrative and clerical systems. The phonetic form of Rothláin gave rise to several anglicised variants, including Rowlan, Rowland, and Rowley.

== Historical overview ==
=== Dynastic context ===
The Ó Rothláin were a Gaelic Irish sept of the Uí Fiachrach, one of the principal dynastic groupings of the Connachta. They belonged specifically to the Uí Fiachrach Muaidhe branch, a northern Connacht lineage centred along the River Moy, and functioned as subordinate chieftains under the overlordship of the Ó Dubhda (O'Dowd) kings.

The Uí Fiachrach traced their descent from Fiachrae, a son of the legendary High King Eochaid Mugmedón, and controlled territories in western Ireland during the early medieval period.

The political organisation of Gaelic Ireland has been described as a network of related kindreds exercising authority within defined territories rather than a centralised state.

=== Territory and political structure ===
The Ó Rothláin were hereditary chieftains (taoisigh) of Cúil Cearnadha (Coolcarney), located between the River Moy and the borders of present-day Counties Mayo and Sligo.

The Ó Rothláin chieftains are associated with the district of Coill Fothaidh within Coolcarney, suggesting that their principal residence or power centre lay in the eastern portion of the territory, along the River Moy between Foxford and Castleconnor, in the vicinity of present-day Attymass and Bonniconlon.

Archaeological evidence within the modern parish of Attymass, corresponding to eastern Coolcarney, indicates a dense concentration of early medieval settlement sites, including numerous ringforts, souterrains, and enclosures. This distribution is characteristic of a Gaelic lordship centre, suggesting that the Ó Rothláin chieftains maintained their principal residence within a clustered settlement zone rather than a single fixed site. The concentration of sites in the Corradrishy, Corrower, and Ballymore areas has been identified as a likely core of this settlement pattern.

Coolcarney formed part of the Uí Fiachrach domain and operated within the Gaelic túath system of governance.

A topographical poem attributed to Seán Mór Ó Dubhagáin records:

O’Rothláin its chieftain, and Ua Cuinn, Ua Iarnáin, and Ua Fináin.

This statement reflects the hierarchical structure of Gaelic lordship, identifying Ó Rothláin as the principal chieftain of the territory, alongside other subordinate or associated ruling families, including Ua Cuinn (modern: O'Quinn or Quinn), Ua Iarnáin (modern: O'Harnan, Harnan, or Yarnan), and Ua Fináin (modern: Finan or Finnan).

=== Medieval annals ===
The Ó Rothláin sept is recorded in several Irish annals, confirming its role in the political life of medieval Connacht.

The Annals of the Four Masters record:

Amlaibh Ua Rothláin, Chief of Calry of Coolcarney, was slain by Ua Móráin (1208).

Further references appear in the 14th century:

Master Ó Rothláin rested in Christ (1337).

The title "Master" indicates a learned individual, suggesting that members of the family were associated with ecclesiastical or scholarly traditions.

=== Literary references ===
"Chief of the whitestoned goblets and spears".

The Ó Rothláin chieftains are described in medieval bardic poetry by Seán Mór Ó Dubhagáin in the mid–14th century as the "chief of the whitestoned goblets and spears," a conventional Gaelic praise formula signifying both aristocratic hospitality and martial authority. The imagery of "goblets and spears" reflects two central expectations of Gaelic lordship: references to goblets evoke the tradition of aristocratic hospitality, in which a chieftain was expected to maintain an open household, provide feasting, and patronise poets and retainers, while the depiction of spears signifies martial authority, including the obligation to command armed followers, defend territorial boundaries, and participate in regional warfare. Together, such motifs form part of a conventional language of praise in medieval Irish literature, expressing the balance of hospitality and military leadership expected of Gaelic rulers.

== See also ==
- Uí Fiachrach
- Coolcarney
- Annals of the Four Masters
- Annals of Connacht
- History of Ireland
