= Gareth Alban Davies =

Welsh poet (1926–2009)

- Born: Gareth Alban Davies; 30 July 1926 Ton Pentre, Wales
- Died: 9 February 2009 (aged 82) Aberystwyth, Wales
- Occupation: Professor
- Literary movement: Cadwgan Circle
- Spouse: Caryl Davies

Gareth Alban Davies (30 July 1926 – 9 February 2009) was a Welsh poet, educator and Hispanist who was Cowdray Professor of Spanish at the University of Leeds. Davies translated many Spanish texts into English and Welsh, and was a noted expert on the works of Fernando Arrabal and Federico García Lorca.

== Early life and education ==
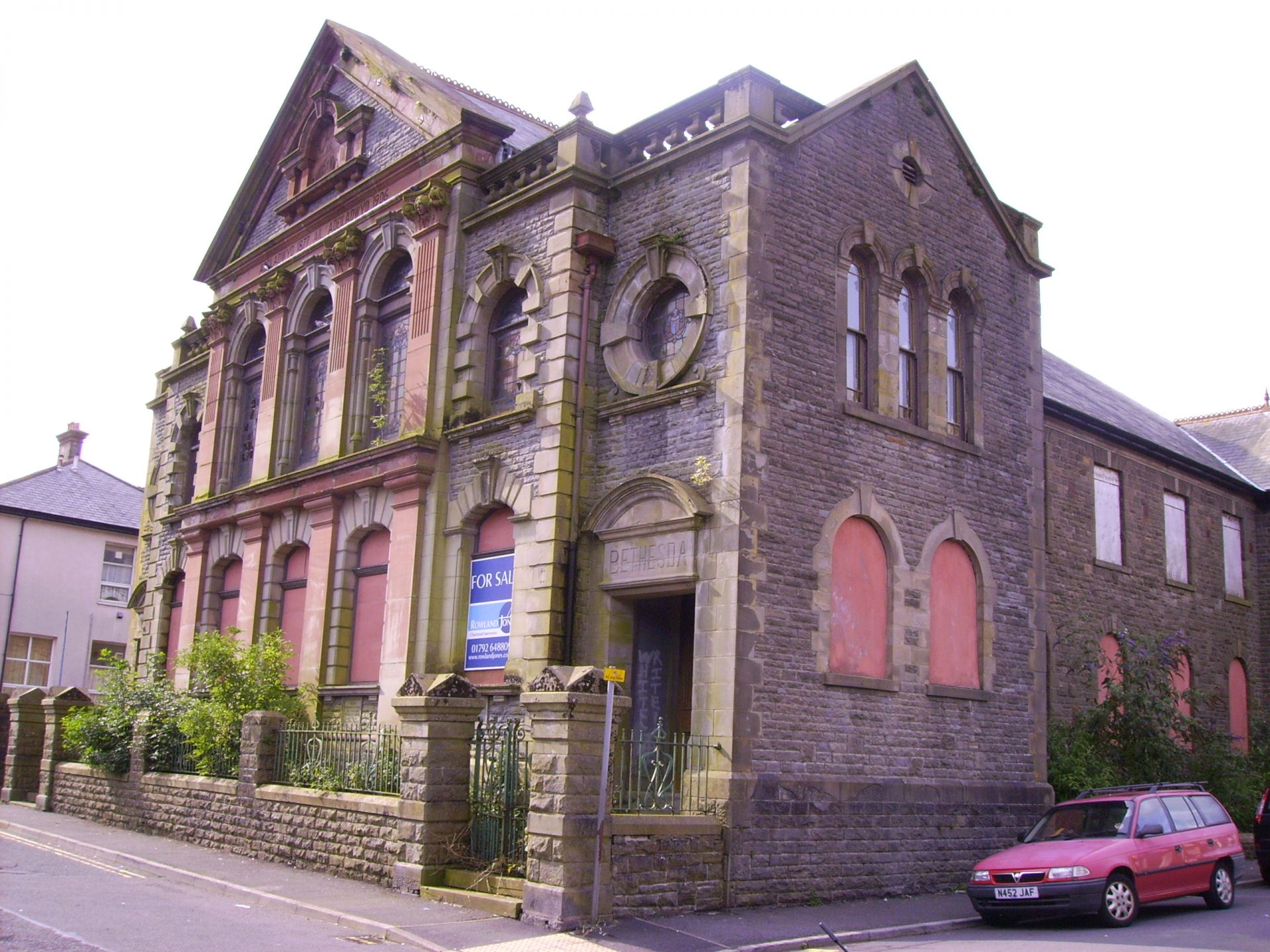
Bethesda Chapel, where Davies' father preached

Davies was born in Ton Pentre on 20 July 1926. His father was The Reverend T. Alban Davies, a Congregationalist preacher who practised at Bethesda Church in Ton Pentre. His father was a Welsh speaker and an early member of Plaid Cymru, the Nationalist political party of Wales. His father was a large influence on Davies' moral viewpoint, and instilled in him a nationalistic and egalitarian ethos. While still a schoolboy, Davies was introduced to the Cadwgan Circle, a group of writers and thinkers from the Rhondda, who met at the house of J. Gwyn Griffiths and his wife Käthe Bosse-Griffiths. Although the youngest of the group, he contributed poems to an anthology published by the movement, and used his time with the group to discuss the French and Spanish literature he was studying at Porth Grammar School.

At the age of 18, and with Britain still at war, Davies was conscripted as a Bevin Boy, which saw him working as a coal miner rather than serve active military duty. He continued his studies during this period, relying on discounted books from London's foremost specialised antiquarian book-seller of Catalan and Castilian language, Joan Gili. Despite his educated background, and his chaste values of refraining from smoking, drinking and womanising, in sharp contrast to many of his collier work-mates, Davies enjoyed his three years spent as a coal miner, believing it brought him closer to the working-class man of the Rhondda.

In 1948, Davies was released from service in the coal mines, and won a scholarship to The Queen's College, Oxford. At Oxford he studied Romance Languages and received an MA and a DPhil.

== Academic career ==
Davies joined the University of Leeds as an Assistant Lecturer in Spanish in 1952. He was promoted to Lecturer in 1955 and to Senior Lecturer in 1968. In 1975, he was appointed Cowdray Professor of Spanish and Head of the Department of Spanish and Portuguese Languages and Literatures. During his time at Leeds Davies held visiting appointments at the University of Cardiff in Wales, Dartmouth College in the United States and at the Australian National University in Canberra.

Davies' main field of study was the Golden Age of Spanish poetry, but he was also interested in nineteenth-century Spanish literature, the Spanish songbooks of the German Romantics and other Spanish and Argentine works, having himself visited Welsh Patagonia. As a translator, Davies found the works of fellow countryman David Rowland of interest. Rowland had translated the anonymous Spanish text La vida de Lazarillo de Tormes y de sus fortunas y adversidades in 1586 and Davies edited a 1991 version published by Gregynog Press.

He retired in 1986 as Emeritus Professor.

== Marriage and children ==
In 1953, whilst in Leeds, he married fellow Rhondda linguist Catherine Glyn Jones. They settled near Otley and had four children: Eleri, Catrin, Gwen and Rhodri. Although the couple spent thirty years in Yorkshire, they kept a strong connection to Welsh culture and taught all their children to speak Welsh.

== Death ==
After his retirement, Davies moved back to Wales, settling in Llangwyryfon, Ceredigion. He died in Aberystwyth on 8 February 2009, aged 82, having survived Caryl who died in 2007.

== Selected works ==
=== Poetry ===
- Baled Lewsyn a'r Mor (1964)
- Trigain (1986)
- Galar y Culfor (1992)

=== Factual work ===
- A Poet at Court: Antonio Hurtado de Mendoza, 1586–1644 (1971)
- Tan Tro Nesaf (1976)
- Dyddiadur Awstralia (1986)
