= Daniel Rowland =

Daniel Rowland may refer to:

- Daniel Rowland (preacher) (1711–1790), leader in the Welsh Calvinistic Methodist revival
- Daniel Rowland (runner) (born 1984), Zimbabwean long-distance trail runner
- Daniel Rowland (cricketer) (1826–1891), English cricketer
- Daniel Rowland (antiquary), English antiquarian
