= Martin Sherlock =

Martin Sherlock was an Anglican priest in Ireland during the late Eighteenth century.

Sherlock was educated at Trinity College, Dublin. He was Chaplain to the Earl of Bristol; Vicar of Castleconnor and Kilglass; and Archdeacon of Killala from 1789 until his death in 1799.
