= Thomas Beard =

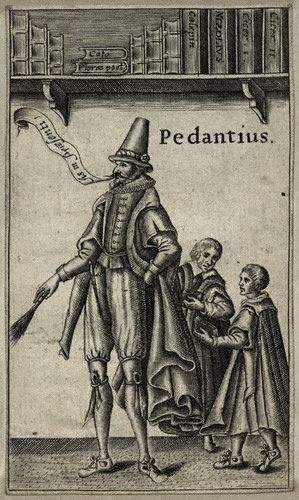
Thomas Beard

Thomas Beard (d. 1632) was an English clergyman and theologian, of Puritan views. He is known as the author of The Theatre of Gods Judgements, and the schoolmaster of Oliver Cromwell at Huntingdon.

== Life ==
He was, it is believed, a native of Huntingdon, but the date of his birth is unknown. He received his education at Jesus College, Cambridge, where he was a sizar and matriculated in 1584. He graduated B.A. in 1588, M.A. in 1591, B.D. in 1602 and D.D. in 1614. He became rector of Kimbolton in 1595. On 21 January 1598 he was collated to the rectory of Hengrave, Suffolk, which he held for a very short time, moving as rector to Aythorpe Roding, Essex, later in the year. In 1605, Beard became master of Huntingdon hospital and grammar school, where he remained for twenty years. It was at this school that Cromwell was educated from around 1604, and was prepared for entrance to Cambridge; he acted in Beard's school plays, and Beard became a friend of the Cromwell family. In March 1614, Beard asked Sir Robert Bruce Cotton for the rectory of Conington, being tired of teaching. He held various rectories with his teaching job, in the end at Wistow where he settled in 1618 for the rest of his life. In 1626, Beard also held a popular lectureship at Huntingdon.

In 1628, when Richard Neile went before the House of Commons of England accused of anti-puritan practices, Beard was summoned as a witness against him. Cromwell's speech in the debate on the subject covers his likely testimony (the parliament was dissolved before Beard could testify). Beard had been appointed in 1617 to preach a sermon on the Sunday after Easter in London, in which, according to custom, he was to recapitulate three sermons previously preached before the lord mayor from an open pulpit in Spital Square. William Alabaster was the preacher whom Beard had to follow, but he announced his intention of exposing Alabaster's support of certain tenets of popery. On Cromwell's account, Neile as Beard's diocesan bishop (diocese of Lincoln) told him not to preach against Alabaster; and reprimanded him later when on the advice of Nicholas Felton he did so.

In 1630 he was made a justice of the peace for the county. He was married, and had children by Mary Heriman; they were married 9 July 1628. Edward Wedlake Brayley in his Beauties of England and Wales recorded the inscription on a brass in the nave of All Saints' Church, Huntingdon, to Beard's memory. In 1633 Archbishop William Laud succeeded in putting the lectureship down.

== Works ==
The Theatre of Gods Judgements, Beard's earliest and most famous book, first appeared in 1597; a work in the tradition of John Foxe's Acts and Monuments, it was popular, plagiarised and pirated. It was itself translated, in part, from the Histoires memorables des grans et merveilleux jugemens et punitions de Dieu by Jean de Chassanion (1531–1598), a Huguenot pastor from Monistrol-sur-Loire, from which it derives its account of the bullet catch trick.

Chassingnon's book provided hundreds of the examples, while Beard added in a scattering from other sources closer to home: Foxe, John Stowe, Raphael Holinshed, pamphlets and ballads. Beard's exposition of the workings of Providence against sinners and persecutors has been called "theatrical moralism". It was in the Theatre of Judgement that first appeared an account of Christopher Marlowe's death by stabbing; Beard takes Marlowe to be the first modern atheist. Other editions followed in 1612 and 1631, with additions, and a fourth edition in folio of 1648.

In 1625 he published a work on the Pope as Antichrist. Beard left in manuscript an Evangelical Tragoedie: or, A Harmonie of the Passion of Christ, according to the four Evangelistes. A Latin comedy Pedantius has been attributed to him, but also to Walter Hawkesworth, Anthony Wingfield and (by modern scholars) to Edward Forsett.
