= Lars Schmidt (producer) =

Swedish theater producer

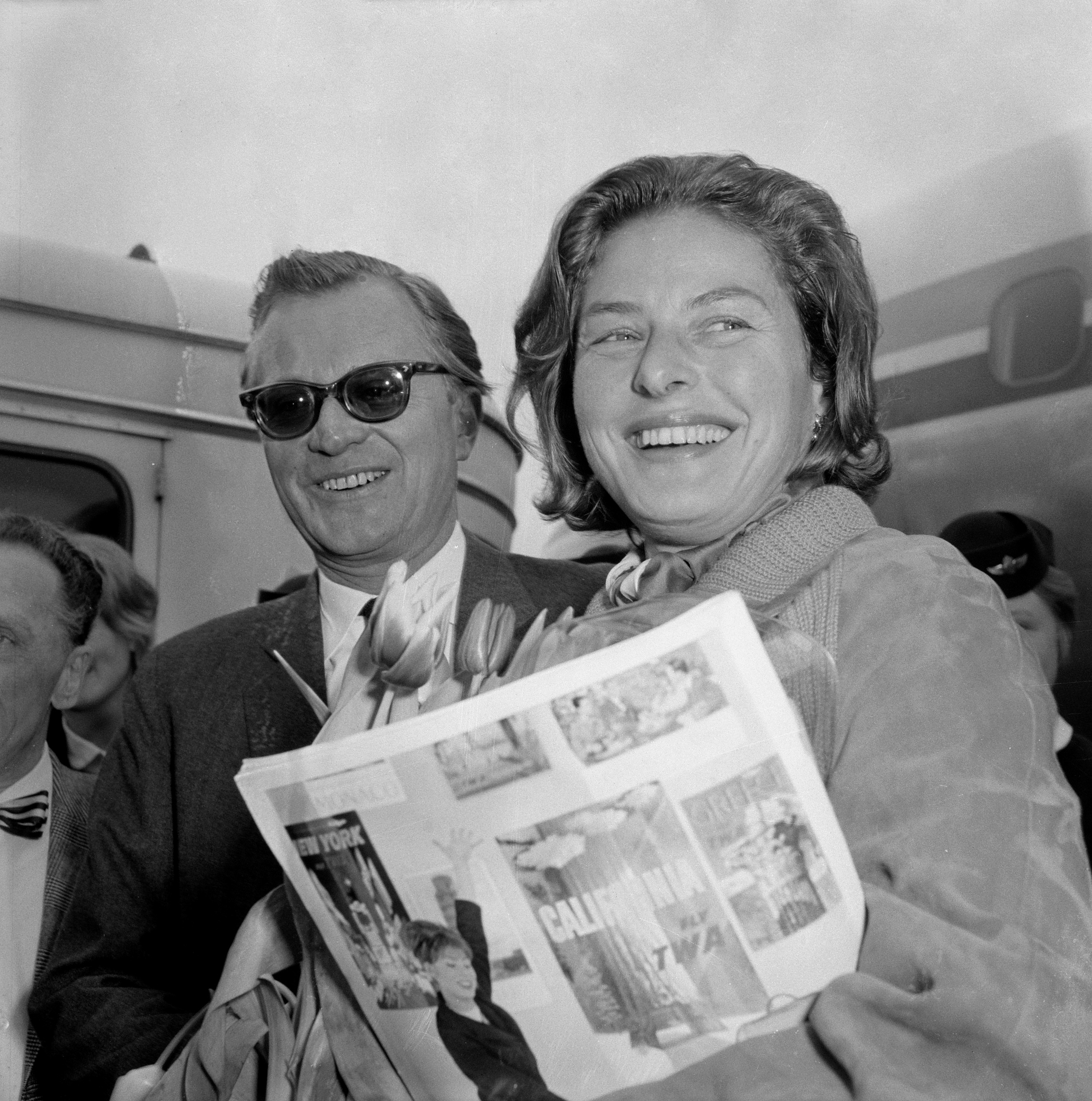
- Lars Schmidt with his first wife Ingrid Bergman, 1961
- Born: Lars Reinhold Schmidt; 11 June 1917; Uddevalla, Sweden
- Died: 18 October 2009 (aged 92); Tanumshede, Sweden
- Occupations: Theatrical producer, director, publisher
- Spouse: Ingrid Bergman (m. 1958; div. 1975)
- Children: 1

Lars Reinhold Schmidt (11 June 1917 – 18 October 2009) was a Swedish theatrical producer, director and publisher. He owned theaters in Paris, France, and Sweden. Schmidt was instrumental in bringing American theater to the European stage. He produced and translated numerous post-war American plays in Europe; including A Streetcar Named Desire, Cat on a Hot Tin Roof, Oklahoma! and Anne Frank. He is considered one of the most important cultural personalities of the 20th century evolution and commercialization of European theatre. In a 1964 Life magazine article, he was called "Europe's most important theatrical producer." Lars Schmidt married three-time Academy Award-winning film star Ingrid Bergman in December 1958.

== Early life ==
He was born in Uddevalla, Sweden. After working in coal mines in Swansea, Wales, he attended the City of London College in 1939. Schmidt returned to Sweden to serve in the army with the Bohuslän Regiment, and the following year he founded Lars Schmidt & Company to procure plays for the Gothenburg City Theatre.

In 1941 aged 24, Lars Schmidt moved to New York with the dream to become a writer for theater. His first Atlantic crossing during World War II to the United States was eventful. His vessel M/S Carolina Thorden was bombed and sunk by two German war planes off Tórshavn in the Faroe Islands, after departing from Finland. A British trawler rescued the survivors, and left them on the Faroe Islands. Schmidt lost his passport, letters of introduction and only had the clothes on his back when he finally arrived in New York, via Havana and Miami.

He spent six months in New York, and during that time forged relationships with theater heavyweights such as Richard Rodgers, Oscar Hammerstein II and Russel Crouse. He returned to Europe as a Swedish diplomatic courier. On the return leg of his journey, he had to travel through Germany by train, surviving bombing raids and hiding in ditches, while carrying both the Swedish diplomatic bag and the Scandinavian rights to Arsenic and Old Lace.

== Career ==
=== Bringing American theater to Scandinavia ===
In 1942, he founded the publishing company Lars Schmidt Teaterforlaget as a holding vehicle for the Scandinavian rights to American plays, and held the European premier of Arsenic and Old Lace in Gothenburg, Sweden.

He returned to New York in 1945, and during a three-month trip bought the rights to over 100 plays; including The Little Foxes, A Bell for Adano, and Life with Father. Upon returning from America, Schmidt held the European premier of Tennessee Williams's The Glass Menagerie in Stockholm, Sweden on 8 February 1946.

In 1947, he set up Schmidt and Bratt Advertising Agency and produced Peter Ustinov's Frenzy on the stage in London, and adaptation of Ingmar Bergman's Swedish film script Hets.

After acquiring the rights of 50 titles by Rodgers and Hammerstein, Schmidt produced the European premier of Oklahoma! in Malmö, Sweden in 1947, and Annie Get Your Gun in Gothenburg in 1949. In 1951, Schmidt produced the European premier of Tennessee Williams's The Rose Tattoo in Gothenburg.

In 1959, he produced the European premier of My Fair Lady in Oslo, Norway. Schmidt had acquired the Scandinavian rights to the musical before it premiered in New York, from his friend the librettist Alan Jay Lerner. Over 820,000 people saw the play after it opened in Stockholm, Sweden, the city at the time had a population of 810,000. Schmidt bought further rights for other European territories. By 1964, the production had grossed over $12 million ($100 million inflation adjusted in 2020), in over 4,000 performances in Sweden, Denmark, Norway, Italy, Germany, Holland, Belgium and Luxembourg.

=== Producing in Paris and London ===
In 1956 he produced his first play in Paris, France; Tennessee Williams's Cat on a Hot Tin Roof, directed by Peter Brook. In 1958 he became co-producer at the Théâtre de l'Athénée in Paris. During this period he produced numerous American stage plays across various theaters in Paris, including Who’s Afraid of Virginia Woolf, 12 Angry Men, How to Succeed in Business Without Really Trying, and Diary of Anne Frank.

In 1957 he had founded International Playwrights Theatre, along with Toby Rowland and Peter Hall; producing Camino Real at the Phoenix Theater, and Brouhaha starring Peter Sellers at the Aldwych Theater on the West End.

In 1962 he produced Ibsen's Hedda Gabler starring his wife Ingrid Bergman at the Théâtre Montparnasse. Schmidt recalled the contract of casting his wife in the Ibsen play, in her presence:

"Ingrid is very expensive, when I asked her to play Hedda Gabler, she told me for Tea and Sympathy she got 25% of the gross. So I paid her that, and she got really quite rich. Then one day I saw the Tea and Sympathy books and found out that she had actually got only 20% of the net. It was too late. I had already paid her."

In 1965, he bought the Théâtre Montparnasse in Paris. In 1977, he opened Petit Montparnasse for avant garde and experimental theater.

In 1983, he produced K2 at Theatre de la Porte Saint Martin in Paris, and in 1986 'night, Mother at Theatre Actuel in Paris. In 1988, he staged La Metamorphose with Roman Polanski at Theatre Gymnase-Marie Bell in Paris.

==== Theater director ====
He directed A. R. Gurney's Love Letters at the Petit Marigny in Paris in 1990, and Sylvia at Théâtre des Bouffes-Parisiens in 1995.

=== New York ===
In 1989 he produced Metamorphosis with Mikhail Baryshnikov at Barrymore Theater in New York City, and in 1994 was nominated for a Tony Award as a member of the production team of Arthur Miller's Broken Glass on Broadway.

=== Television producer ===
In 1961, he produced the TV movie Twenty-Four Hours in a Woman's Life, in 1962 Hedda Gabler, and in 1966 The Human Voice all starring his wife Ingrid Bergman.

== Personal life ==
Lars Schmidt married Ingrid Bergman in 1958, at Caxton Hall in London, England, and they divorced in 1975. He married the Hungarian model Kristina Belfrage in 1977, with whom he had one son, Kristian Schmidt. In 1998, he married Danish Art Nouveau dealer Yanne Norup.

He died in Tanumshede, Sweden, in 2009.

== Awards ==
1980: Chevalier of French Legion of Honor

1981: Illis quorum

1994: Tony Award Nomination for Best Pay; Broken Glass

1997: Officer of French Legion of Honor

2005: Commander of French Legion of Honor
