= Coolcarney =

Former Irish district

Coolcarney (Irish: Cuil Cearnadha), also called Callraighe of Cuill, was an Irish district located in Connacht, within the Barony of Gallen stretching across both County Mayo, and County Sligo. It was unique in that it was a separate principality of the Uí Fiachrach from the rest of the Barony of Gallen.

Coolcarney (Ireland)
Approximate extent of Coolcarney (Cúil Cearnadha)

== Overview ==
Dubhaltach Mac Fhirbhisigh states in a poem written in 1417 that, Coolcarney "embraced the territory between Beel Lasa (or Foxford) and the Brosnach river in Castleconnor." Historically there were four hereditary tribes of the area: O'Fionain, O'Rothlain, O'Tuathalain, and O'Cuinn, with the O'Rothlain being its chieftain. Over time the region was reduced to an area within the modern parishes of Attymass and Kilgarvan. Further description is given by John O'Donovan:

“Cuil-Cearnadha is called Calraidhe Cuile from its being in the corner or angle of Fith-Gathlaidh; and, if the learned say truly, it is to it the appellation of Calraidhe Innse-Nisc should be given.”
