= William Phiston =

English translator and author (fl. 1571 – 1609)

William Phiston or Fiston (fl. 1571 – 1609), was an English translator and author. He describes himself as "a student of London", and had some leading figures of the time as patrons. The Oxford Dictionary of National Biography points out that a William Phiston matriculated at Magdalene College, Cambridge in 1572. It also notes the strong Protestant tone to the Testimonie, intended as a cheaper substitute for the Actes and Monuments.

== Works ==
Phiston's works are:

- A Testimonie of the True Church of God … translated out of the French by William Phiston, London; c. 1570. From Simon Voyon, dedicated to Alexander Nowell.
- A Lamentacion of Englande for John Ivele [i.e. John Jewel], bishop of Sarisburie, by W. Ph. London [1571].
- Certaine Godly Sermons … First set foorthe by Master Bernardine Occhine … and now lately collected and translated out of the Italian tongue into the English by William Phiston of London, student, London, 1580; from Bernardino Ochino, and dedicated to Edmund Grindal.
- The Welspringe of Wittie Conceites … translated out of the Italian by W. Phist., student, London, 1584; Phiston added other matter, "partly the invention of late writers and partly mine own". Publisher's dedication to David Lewis.
- The Estate of the Germaine Empire, with the Description of Germanie, London, 1595; a translation from two works, one Italian the other Latin. Dedicated to Robert Radclyffe, 5th Earl of Sussex. It was an ambitious historical, ecclesiastical and military guide to the Holy Roman Empire.
- The Auncient Historie of the Destruction of Troy … translated out of the French [of Le Fevre] into English by W. Caxton Newly corrected and the English much amended by William Fiston, London, 1596; another edit. 1607.
- The Most Pleasant and Delectable Historie of Lazarillo de Tormes, a Spanyard; and of his marvellous Fortunes and Adversities. The second part, translated out of Spanish by W. P., London, 1596. A sequel to Lazarillo de Tormes, the first part having been translated by David Rowland.
- An edition of Francis Segar's conduct book, Schoole of Good manners, or a new Schoole of Vertue … by William Fiston, London, 1609; another edition, "newly corrected" by Phiston, appeared in 1629; but Phiston is not known to have been alive then.
