= Robin Rowland =

Robin Rowland is the name of:

- Robin Rowland (author), Canadian author
- Robin Rowland (judge), British judge
