= Rowland ring =

Rowland's ring (a.k.a. Rowland ring) is an experimental arrangement for the measurement of the hysteresis curve of a sample of magnetic material. It was developed by Henry Augustus Rowland.

The geometry of a Rowland's ring is usually a toroid of magnetic material around which is closely wound a magnetization coil consisting of a large number of windings to magnetize the material, and a sampling coil consisting of a smaller number of windings to sample the induced magnetic flux. The electric current flowing in the magnetization coil dictates the magnetic field intensity $\mathbf{H}$ in the material. The sampling coil produces a voltage proportional to the rate of change of the magnetic field $\mathbf{B}$ in the material. By measuring the time integral of the voltage in the sampling coil versus the current in the magnetization coil, one obtains the hysteresis curve.

== See also ==
- Electromagnetic induction
