= Mercedes Agulló =

Spanish historian (1925–2019)

CBE Mercedes Agulló
- Agulló in her Biblioteca Nacional de España library card, 1946
- Born: Mercedes Agulló y Cobo; 23 October 1925; Madrid, Spain
- Died: 4 January 2019 (aged 93); El Puerto de Santa María, Spain

Academic background
- Education: Complutense University of Madrid

Academic work
- Discipline: Historiography
- Sub-discipline: Palaeography

Mercedes Agulló y Cobo CBE (born in Madrid on 23 October 1925; died in El Puerto de Santa María on 4 January 2019) was a Spanish historian known for her research on Lazarillo de Tormes and Don Quixote made public in 2010.

Her work in the field of the historiography of books, painting, sculpture and theatre stands out, which led to the creation of the Mercedes Agulló and Cobo Digital Library at the University of Massachusetts (Boston), where all her publications are collected and her latest works are presented. Her research work in national and parish archives is also important, and she is considered an outstanding palaeographer, which is reflected in her large number of documentary works, always based on her transcriptions.

In March 2010, Mercedes Agulló in her book "A vueltas con el autor del Lazarillo" published an investigation in which, based on the discovery in some papers by Diego Hurtado de Mendoza with the phrase "a file of corrections made for the printing of Lazarillo and Propaladia", she postulated "a serious hypothesis about the authorship of Lazarillo that, strengthened by other facts and circumstances, points solidly in the direction of Don Diego".

The hypothesis takes up again a traditional attribution, since in 1607, in the catalogue of Spanish writers Catalogus Clarorum Hispaniae scriptorum, which was written by the flamenco Valerio Andrés Taxandro, it is said that Diego Hurtado de Mendoza "composed [...] the entertainment book called Lazarillo de Tormes". Other authors from the 17th century, as well as the Diccionario de Autoridades de la Real Academia Española (1726-1739), mention this attribution, which reached a certain fortune, especially in the 19th century.
