= Rolands =

Male given name

- Gender: Male
- Name day: 18 October

Origin
- Region of origin: Latvia

Other names
- Related names: Roland

Rolands is a Latvian masculine given name. It is the Latvian spelling of Roland and may refer to:

- Rolands Bērziņš (born 1975), Latvian chess International Master
- Rolands Broks (born 1969), Latvian politician
- Rolands Bulders (born 1965), Latvian footballer
- Rolands Freimanis (born 1988), Latvian basketball player
- Rolands Kalniņš (1922-2022), Latvian film director
- Rolands Rikards, Latvian scientist, preofessor and politician
- Rolands Šmits (born 1995), Latvian basketball player
- Rolands Štrobinders (born 1992), Latvian javelin thrower
- Rolands Upatnieks (1932–1994), Latvian luger

== See also ==
- Roelands, a town in Western Australia
- Rowlands, a surname
