= Ginés de Pasamonte =

- Don Quixote character
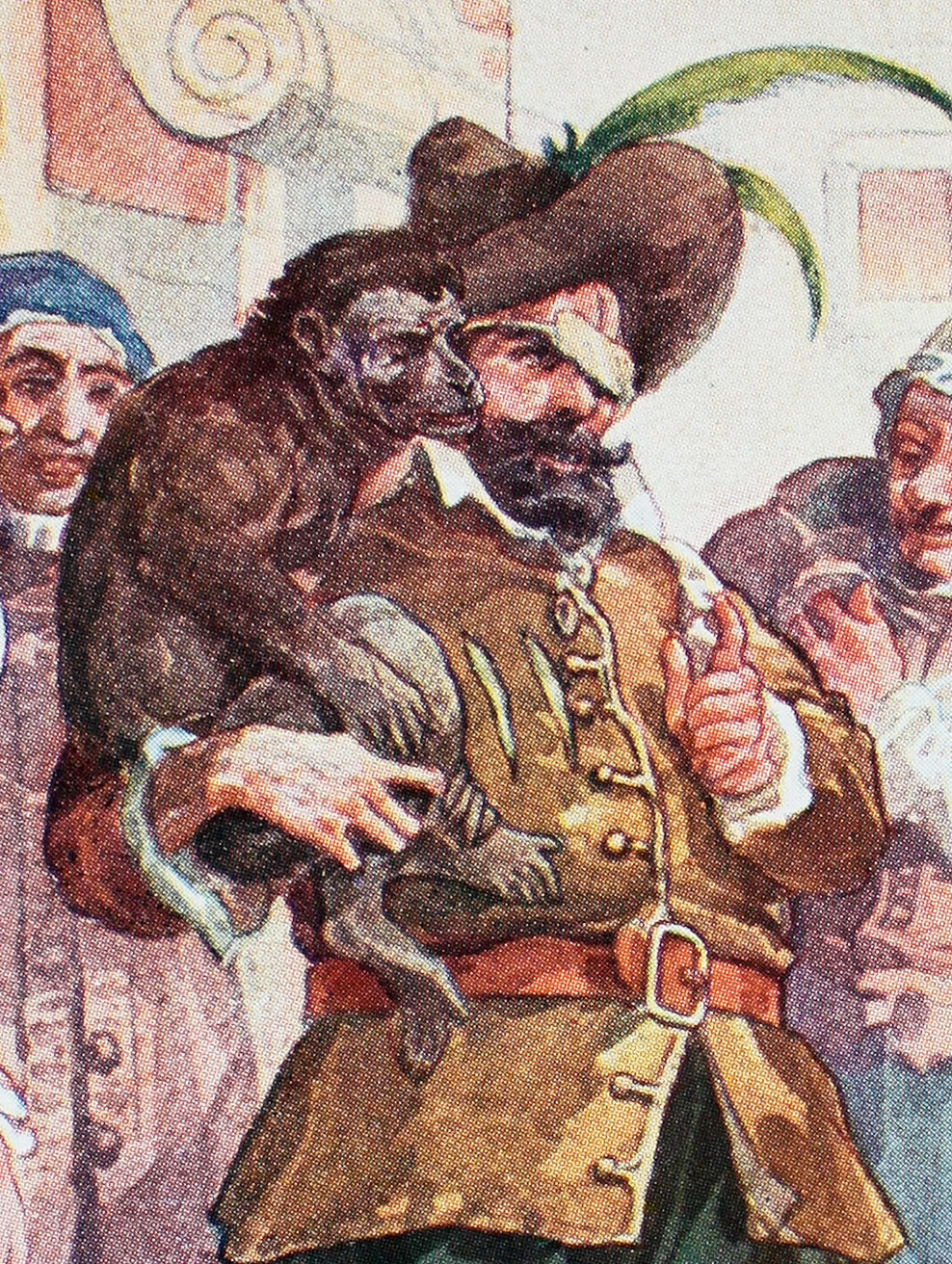
- First appearance: Part I, Chapter 22 (as prisoner)
- Last appearance: Part II, Chapter 26 (as puppet master)
- Created by: Miguel de Cervantes

In-universe information
- Alias: Ginesillo de Parapilla
- Gender: Male
- Occupation: Thief, writer, puppeteer
- Nationality: Spanish

Ginés de Pasamonte is a fictional character in Miguel de Cervantes' novel Don Quixote.

Ginés first appears as a criminal freed by Don Quixote in the 22nd chapter of the first part of the novel. After his release, he escapes Don Quixote and the guards. He later reappears as Maese Pedro, a puppeteer who claims that he can talk to his monkey, in the 25th and 26th chapters of the second part.

He also stole Sancho's donkey, a part that was omitted from the first edition.

Prior to his release by Don Quixote, Ginés tells him that he is in the process of writing his autobiography. Don Quixote interrogates this writer about his book;

"Is it so good?" said Don Quixote.

"So good is it," replied Gines, "that a fig for 'Lazarillo de Tormes,' and all of that kind that have been written, or shall be written compared with it: all I will say about it is that it deals with facts, and facts so neat and diverting that no lies could match them."

"And how is the book entitled?" asked Don Quixote.

"The Life of Ginés de Pasamonte," replied the subject of it.

"And is it finished?" asked Don Quixote.

"How can it be finished," said the other, "when my life is not yet

finished?

— Literature Network: Miguel de Cervantes: Don Quixote,

This is the only reference to the popular novel Lazarillo de Tormes in the main narrative of the book (Lazarillo, specifically an episode in which he uses a straw to steal wine from a blind man, is also mentioned in one of the "commendatory verses" before the narrative), and it acts as a foil for Don Quixote's will to be a literary hero in his own lifetime.

== See also ==
- List of Don Quixote characters
