= Julie Rowland =

New Zealand structural geologist

Academic background
- Education: University of Auckland, University of Otago
- Thesis: Hydrothermal fluid redistribution in a magmatic rift: The Ruaumoko Rift System, Taupo Volcanic Zone, New Zealand (2001)

Julie Varina Rowland is a New Zealand structural geologist, and is a full professor at the University of Auckland, specialising in tectonic-magmatic-hydrologic interactions, particularly in rift systems. In 2015 she became the first woman to win the Geoscience Society of New Zealand's McKay Hammer Award.

== Academic career ==
Rowland undertook her undergraduate training at the University of Auckland, and has a Diploma in Secondary Education from the Auckland College of Education. She taught at a number of Auckland schools, including Tangaroa College, James Cook High School, and St Cuthberts College, and Western Springs College, where she was head of the department of physical education.

In 2001 Rowland completed a PhD titled Hydrothermal fluid redistribution in a magmatic rift: The Ruaumoko Rift System, Taupo Volcanic Zone, New Zealand at the University of Otago. Rowland then joined the faculty of the University of Auckland, rising to full professor in 2024. Rowland was the Head of School of Environment, and as of 2024 is the Deputy Dean of the Faculty of Science Administration. In 2024 Rowland was elected to serve two years as Vice President of Regional Affairs for the international Society of Economic Geologists.

Rowland's research interests focus on tectonic-magmatic-hydrologic interactions. Her work is of relevance for understanding geological hazards, fundamental tectonics, and mineral exploration.

== Honours and awards ==
In 2015 Rowland was awarded the Geoscience Society of New Zealand's major award, the McKay Hammer Award. She was the first woman to win the award.

== Selected works ==
- Rowland, Julie Varina; Sibson, Richard Hugh (2001). "Extensional fault kinematics within the Taupo Volcanic Zone, New Zealand: Soft‐linked segmentation of a continental rift system". New Zealand Journal of Geology and Geophysics. 44 (2): 271–283. doi:10.1080/00288306.2001.9514938. Wikidata Q125534353.
- Rowland, Julie Varina; Sibson, Richard Hugh (2004). "Structural controls on hydrothermal flow in a segmented rift system, Taupo Volcanic Zone, New Zealand". Geofluids. 4 (4): 259–283. doi:10.1111/j.1468-8123.2004.00091.x. Wikidata Q125534354.
- Hamling, Ian; Sigrún Hreinsdóttir; Clark, Kate; et al. (2017). "Complex multifault rupture during the 2016 Mw 7.8 Kaikōura earthquake, New Zealand". Science. 356 (6334). doi:10.1126/science.aam7194. PMID 28336563. Wikidata Q38881059.
- Rowland, Julie Varina; S. F. Simmons (2012). "Hydrologic, Magmatic, and Tectonic Controls on Hydrothermal Flow, Taupo Volcanic Zone, New Zealand: Implications for the Formation of Epithermal Vein Deposits". Economic Geology and the Bulletin of the Society of Economic Geologists. 107 (3): 427–457. doi:10.2113/econgeo.107.3.427. Wikidata Q59665014.
- Nicolas Le Corvec; Spörli, Bernhard Klaus; Rowland, Julie Varina; Lindsay, Marie Jan (2013). "Spatial distribution and alignments of volcanic centers: Clues to the formation of monogenetic volcanic fields". Earth-Science Reviews. 124: 96–114. Bibcode:2013ESRv..124...96L. doi:10.1016/j.earscirev.2013.05.005. Wikidata Q60059621.
- Ebinger, Cynthia; Atalay Ayele; Keir, Derek; Rowland, Julie Varina; Gezahegn Yirgu; Wright, Tim; Manahloh Belachew; Hamling, Ian (2010). "Length and Timescales of Rift Faulting and Magma Intrusion: The Afar Rifting Cycle from 2005 to Present". Annual Review of Earth and Planetary Sciences. 38 (1): 439–466. Bibcode:2010AREPS..38..439E. doi:10.1146/annurev-earth-040809-152333. Wikidata Q60706633.
