= Diego Hurtado de Mendoza (poet) =

Spanish novelist and poet

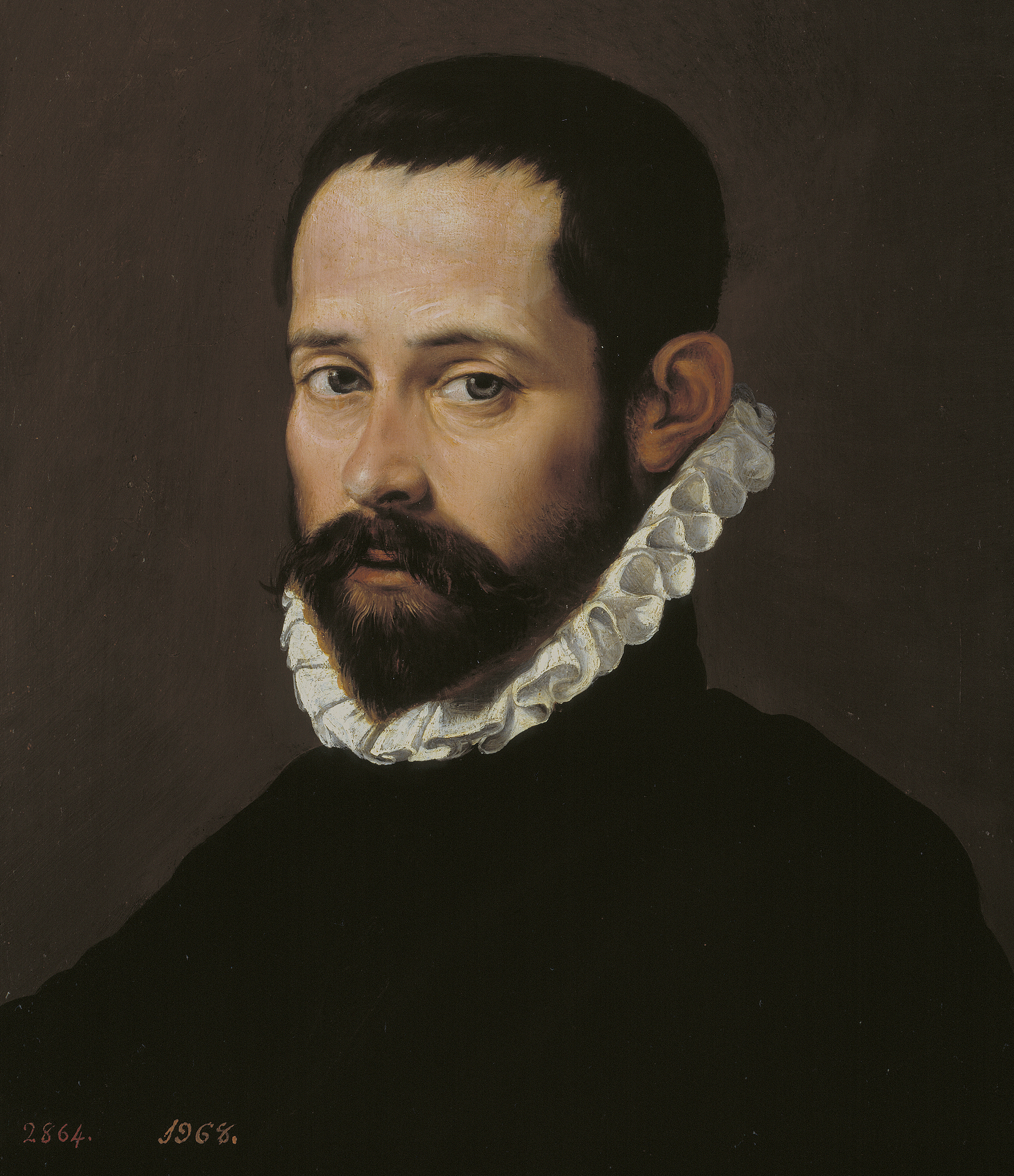
An anonymous 16th-century painting of Mendoza (Museo del Prado).

Diego Hurtado de Mendoza (Spanish pronunciation: [ˈdjeɣo wɾˈtaðo ðe menˈdoθa]; 1503/4 – 14 August 1575), Spanish novelist, poet, diplomat and historian.

== Life ==
Diego Hurtado de Mendoza was born in Granada in late 1503 or early 1504.

He was a younger son of the second Conde de Tendilla Íñigo López de Mendoza y Quiñones and Francisca Pacheco. His older siblings were: Luis de Mendoza y Pacheco, II Marquis de Mondejar, III Count Tendilla, governor of Granada; Antonio de Mendoza y Pacheco, first Viceroy of New Spain and later Peru; Bernardino de Mendoza y Pacheco, Captain of the Spanish Galleys most noted for the (temporary) victory over Tunis; Francisco de Mendoza y Pacheco, Bishop of Úbeda; and Maria Mendoza y Pacheco (María Pacheco), a leader of the 1519 Revolt of the Comuneros. The Marquis of Santillana was his great-grandfather.

On leaving the University of Salamanca, Mendoza abandoned his intention of taking orders, served under Charles V in Italy, and attended lectures at the universities of Bologna, Padua and Rome. In 1537 he was sent to the Kingdom of England to arrange a marriage between Henry VIII and Christina of Denmark, the widowed Duchess of Milan, as well as a marriage between Prince Louis of Portugal and Mary Tudor. Despite the failure of his mission, he retained the confidence of the emperor, and in 1539 was appointed ambassador at Venice. During his years in Venice he built up his library, buying books printed by the Aldine Press and employing scribes to copy Greek manuscripts. He procured copies of the Greek manuscripts belonging to Cardinal Bessarion, and acquired other rare codices from the monastery of Mount Athos. The first printed Greek edition of the works of Josephus, based on texts from Mendoza's collection, was edited by the Flemish humanist Arnoldus Arlenius, who worked in Mendoza's library, and published in Basle by Hieronymus Froben in 1544.

He acted for some time as military governor of Siena, represented Spain diplomatically at the Council of Trent, and in 1547 was nominated special plenipotentiary at Rome, where he remained till 1554. He was never a favourite of Philip II, and a quarrel with a courtier resulted in his banishment from court in June 1568. The remaining years of his life, which were spent at Granada, he devoted to the study of Arabic (which he had learned at home when growing up), to poetry, and to his history of the Moorish insurrection of 1568–1570. He died in 1575, leaving his library to the king.

== Writings ==
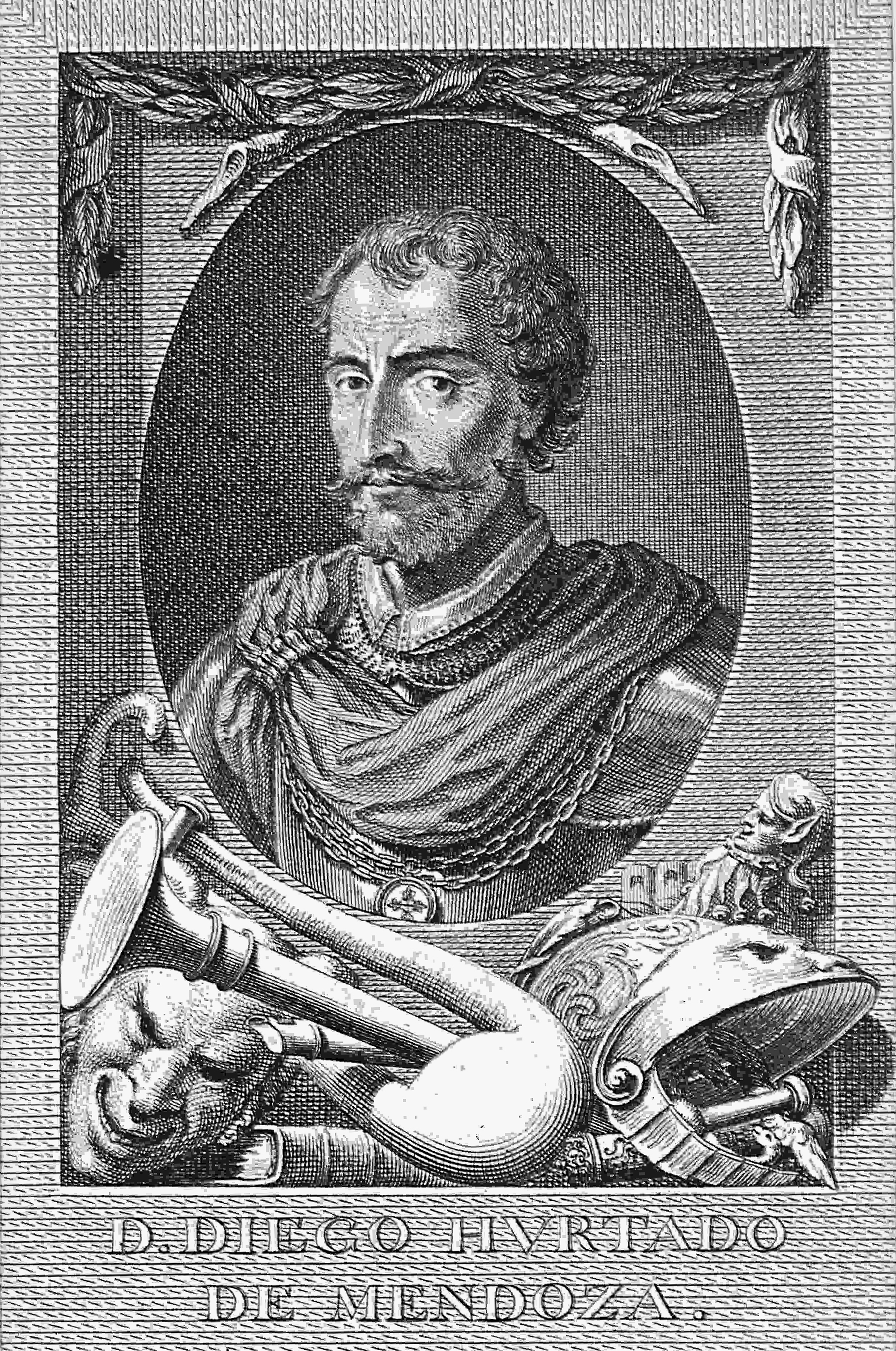
Diego Hurtado de Mendoza, frontispiece to his Works, Madrid 1770

His Guerra de Granada (concerning the 1568 Morisco Revolt in the Alpujarras) was published in Madrid in 1610 and in Lisbon by Luis Tribaldos de Toledo in 1627; the delay was doubtless due to Mendoza's severe criticism of contemporaries who survived him. A complete edition was not published until 1730. In some passages the author deliberately imitates Sallust and Tacitus; his style is, on the whole, vivid and trenchant, his information is exact, and in critical insight he is not inferior to Juan de Mariana.

The attribution to Mendoza of Lazarillo de Tormes is disputed, but documents recently discovered by the Spanish paleographer Mercedes Agulló reinforce the hypothesis. That he excelled in picaresque malice is proved by his indecorous verses written in the old Castilian metres and in the more elaborate measures imported from Italy. Mendoza is also believed to be the author of the letters to Feliciano de Silva and to Captain Salazar, published by Antonio Paz y Melia in Sales Espanolas (Madrid, 1900).

== List of publications ==
- A. Senn y Alonso, D. Diego Hurtado de Mendoza, apuntes biográfico-críticos (Granada, 1886)
- Calendar of Letters and Papers foreign and domestic, Henry VIII., vols. xii. and xiii.
- C. Graux, Essai sur l'origine du fonds grec de l'Escurial (Paris, 1880)
- R. Foulch-Delbosc, Étude sur la Guerra de Granada in the "Revue hispanique" (Paris, 1894), vol. i.
- A. Morel-Fatio, "Quelques remarques sur La Guerre de Grenade de D. Diego Hurtado de Mendoza," in Annuaire de l'Ecole des Hautes Etudes, 1914-15 (Paris, 1914).
- Erika Spivakovsky, The son of the Alhambra. Don Diego Hurtado de Mendoza, 1504-1575, Austin : University of Texas Press, 1970.
- Michael J. Levin, Agents of Empire. Spanish Ambassadors in Sixteenth-Century Italy, New York: Cornell University Press, 2005.
