= David Rowlands =

David Rowlands may refer to:

- David Rowlands (civil servant), British civil servant
- David Rowlands (Dewi Môn), Welsh Congregational minister, college head and poet
- David Rowlands (politician), Welsh politician
- David Rowlands (surgeon), Welsh naval surgeon

== See also ==
- David Rowland (disambiguation), multiple people
