= David Rowland =

David Rowland may refer to:

- David Rowland (industrial designer) (1924–2010), American industrial designer
- David Rowland (property developer) (born 1945), British property developer
- David Rowland (translator) (1569–1586), Welsh translator
