= Rowland Park =

Rowland Park may refer to:

- Rowland Park (New Jersey)
- Rowland Park (New South Wales)

== See also ==
- Roland Park, Baltimore, Maryland, US
