= Caroline Rowland =

Caroline Rowland may refer to:

- Caroline Rowland (filmmaker), British-Swiss filmmaker
- Caroline Ann Rowland (1852–1912), Australian nun
- Caroline F. Rowland (born 1971), British psychologist
