= Daniel Rowland (preacher) =

Welsh Calvinistic Methodist leader (1713–1790)

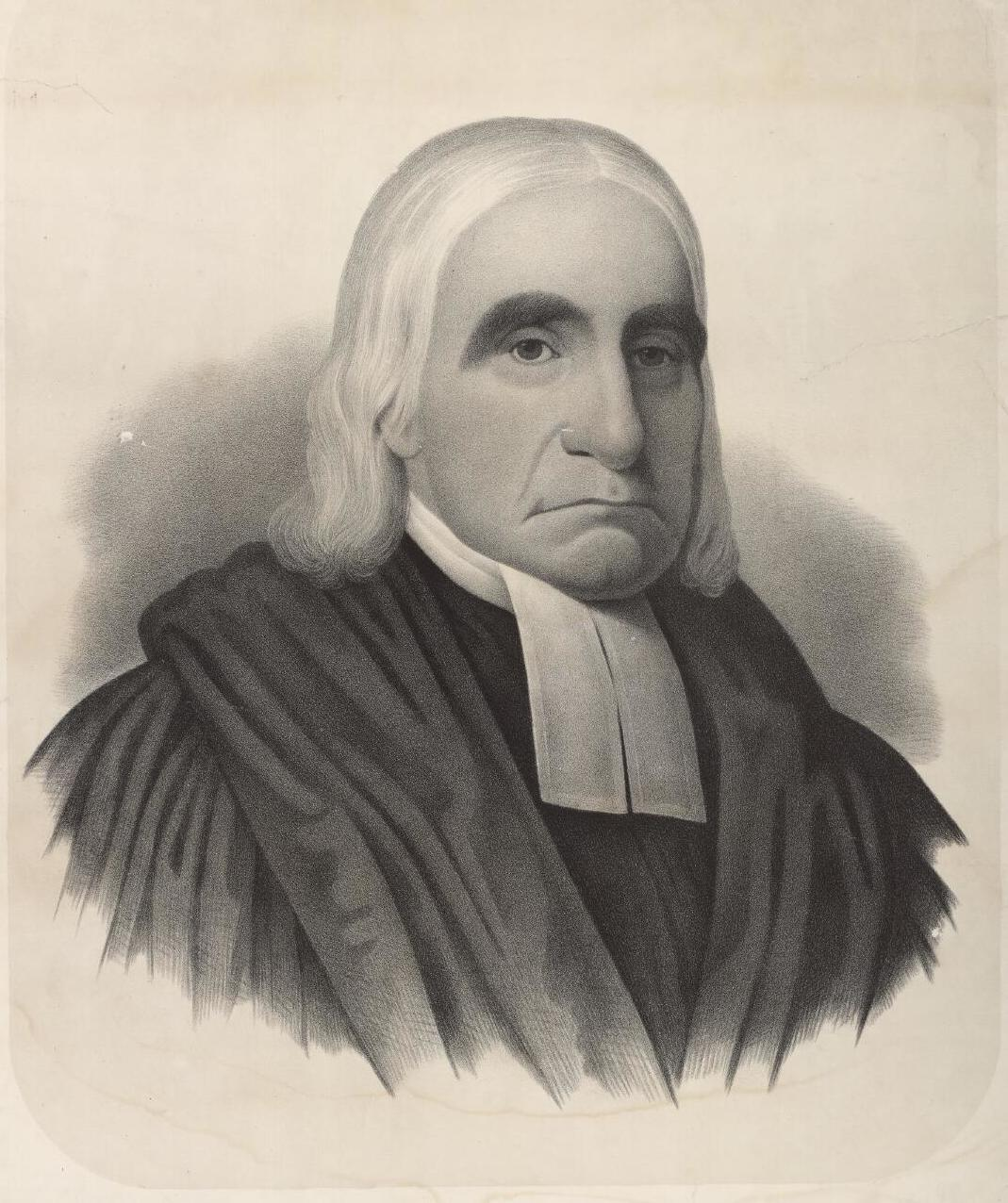
- Born: c. 1711; Pantybeudy, Nantcwnlle, Cardiganshire, Wales
- Died: 1790 (aged 78–79)
- Occupations: Minister, evangelist
- Spouse: Elinor Rowland (née Davies)
- Children: 2
- Parent(s): Daniel Rowland, Janet Rowland (née Thomas)

Ecclesiastical career
- Religion: Calvinistic Methodism

Daniel Rowland (also spelt Rowlands, 1713 – 16 October 1790) served as an Evangelist and early on as an Anglican curate. He was one of the foremost figures in the Welsh Calvinistic Methodist revival, along with the evangelist Howell Harris and the hymnist William Williams. For 55 years Daniel Rowland was one of the leading evangelists in Wales.

== Curacies ==
Rowland was born in Nantcwnlle, Ceredigion, in either 1713 or 1711. For most of his life he was curate in the parishes of Nantcwnlle and Llangeitho.

Following his conversion by Griffith Jones, Llanddowror, in 1735, he became renowned as a preacher and made Llangeitho memorable as a centre for Calvinistic Methodism in Wales.

The Anglican Church authorities deprived him of his Nantcwnlle curacy in about 1763, an action which was unpopular with parishioners. Following this, he established a Methodist "cause" in Llangeitho, and by 1770 was said to be attracting congregations of over a thousand, making it necessary to preach outdoors. This practice became an influence on the English Methodist preacher George Whitefield.

== Preaching and relations with Howell Harris ==
Rowland's early preaching gave much attention to God's judgement in his sermons. As he matured in his ministry, he placed more emphasis on the saving work of Jesus on the Cross. His theology and character were seen as more consistent and stable than those of his counterpart Howell Harris, whom he met in 1737. One of the best-known of Rowland's sermons is "The Redeemer's Voice", which takes as its text a passage from the Book of Revelation.

At first Rowland and Harris worked together as leaders of the Methodist revival, but by 1741, they had fallen out, and in 1750 they ceased to cooperate.

== Family ==
One of Rowland's great-grandchildren was the novelist Anne Adalisa Puddicombe (Allen Raine). His grandson was the antiquarian Daniel Rowland.
