= Jan Lindsay =

New Zealand geologist

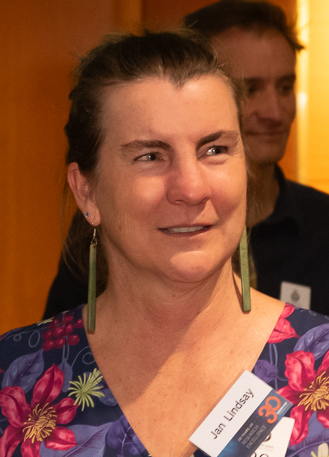
Lindsay in 2024

Jan Marie Lindsay (born 1970) is a New Zealand geologist and Professor of Volcanology at the University of Auckland in New Zealand.

== Early life and education ==
Jan Lindsay was born in 1970 in Rotorua, New Zealand. She attended Westbrook Primary School and Sunset Intermediate. She moved to Apia in Western Samoa when she was 11 and lived there for 2 years, attending Leififi Intermediate School and then Samoa College. After returning to New Zealand, she lived with her family in Glenfield, Auckland and attended Glenfield College. She developed a love for travel at an early age – spending several months in Adelaide Australia at age 15 as a Rotary exchange student, and 1 year in Hildesheim, West Germany in 1988/1989 as an AFS exchange student.

She attended the University of Auckland where she was awarded a Bachelor of Science degree in Geology in 1993 and a Master of Science in Geology in 1995. She was awarded a Dr. rer. nat. in Geowissenschaften (doctorate in geoscience) from the Justus-Liebig-Universität Gießen in 2000, for research on La Pacana caldera, a late Miocene age supervolcano in Chile. During her PhD studies she was based at the GeoForschungsZentrum (GFZ) in Potsdam, Germany.

== Career and impact ==
Between 1995 and 1996 Lindsay worked as a research assistant at the Wairakei Research Centre of GNS Science in Taupō (1995–1996), this was during the time of the Ruapehu 1995/1996 eruption. After her PhD studies at the GeoForschungsZentrum (GFZ) in Potsdam, Germany (1996–1999) she moved to the University of the West Indies Seismic Research Unit (now Centre) in Trinidad where she was a Research Fellow from 2000–2003. Since 2006 she has worked in the Faculty of Science at the University of Auckland, where she was promoted to Professor in 2020, becoming New Zealand’s first woman Professor in Volcanology.

She has served as Vice President of the International Association of Volcanology and Chemistry of the Earth's Interior (IAVCEI) (2019–2023) and has co-led the IAVCEI Working Group on Volcanic Hazard Mapping since 2014. She has served as Editor-in-Chief of the Journal of Applied Volcanology (2018–2022) and as President of the Geoscience Society of New Zealand (2010–2011). She is also a member of the New Zealand Volcano Science Advisory Panel (2012 – present). She has held leadership roles within Auckland University, including as Associate Dean of Science (Research) between 2018 and 2024.

Lindsay's research aims to enhance society's resilience to volcanic hazards by studying magmatic and volcanic processes. She also works on developing and testing methods to improve communication between scientists and stakeholders, facilitating the efficient adoption of hazard and risk research. She has worked on projects in the broad area of volcanic geology, hazard and risk in New Zealand, Chile, Argentina, the Lesser Antilles, Hawai’i and Saudi Arabia. Her work on volcanic hazard assessment in the Caribbean led to publication of the Volcanic hazard atlas of the Lesser Antilles. She has co-led the long-lived transdisciplinary Determining Volcanic Risk in Auckland (DEVORA) project since 2008 and co-leads the Urban Theme of the MBIE-funded Resilience to Nature’s Challenges National Science Challenge (2019–2024). She co-led the Volcanic Risk in Saudi Arabia (VORISA) project, funded by King Abdulaziz University in Saudi Arabia between 2011 and 2013. Her work on volcanic hazard and risk assessment informs Volcanic Emergency Plans and outreach campaigns in New Zealand and other regions.

== Selected works ==
Ang, P. S., Bebbington, M. S., Lindsay, J. M., & Jenkins, S. F. (2020). From eruption scenarios to probabilistic volcanic hazard analysis: An example of the Auckland Volcanic Field, New Zealand. Journal of Volcanology and Geothermal Research, 397. doi:10.1016/j.jvolgeores.2020.106871

Bertin D, Lindsay JM, Cronin SJ, de Silva SL, Connor CB, Caffe PJ, Grosse P, Báez W, Bustos E and Constantinescu R (2022) Probabilistic Volcanic Hazard Assessment of the 22.5–28°S Segment of the Central Volcanic Zone of the Andes. Front. Earth Sci. 10:875439. doi:10.3389/feart.2022.875439

Clive M.A., Lindsay J.M., Leonard G.S., Lutteroth C., Bostrom A., Corballis P. (2021) Volcanic hazard map visualisation affects cognition and crisis decision-making. International Journal of Disaster Risk Reduction 55 doi:10.1016/j.ijdrr.2021.102102

Le Corvec, N., Spörli, K. B., Rowland, J., & Lindsay, J. (2013). Spatial distribution and alignments of volcanic centers: Clues to the formation of monogenetic volcanic fields. Earth-Science Reviews, 124, 96–114. doi:10.1016/j.earscirev.2013.05.005

Lindsay, J. M., & Robertson, R. E. A. (2018). Integrating Volcanic Hazard Data in a Systematic Approach to Develop Volcanic Hazard Maps in the Lesser Antilles. Frontiers in Earth Science, 6. doi:10.3389/feart.2018.00042

Lindsay, J. M., & Rashad Moufti, M. (2014). Assessing Volcanic Risk in Saudi Arabia. Eos, Transactions American Geophysical Union, 95(31), 277–278. doi:10.1002/2014EO310002

Lindsay, J. M., Trumbull, R. B., Schmitt, A. K., Stockli, D. F., Shane, P. A., & Howe, T. M. (2013). Volcanic stratigraphy and geochemistry of the Soufriere Volcanic Centre, Saint Lucia with implications for volcanic hazards. JOURNAL OF VOLCANOLOGY AND GEOTHERMAL RESEARCH, 258, 126–142. doi:10.1016/j.jvolgeores.2013.04.011

Lindsay, J. M., Trumbull, R. B., Schmitt, A. K., DeSilva, S. L., & Siebel, W. (2001). Magmatic evolution of the La Pacana Caldera system, Central Andes, Chile: Compositional variation of two cogenetic, large volume felsic ignimbrites. Journal of Petrology, 42(3), 459–486. doi:10.1093/petrology/42.3.459

Lindsay, J. M., de Silva, S., Trumbull, R., Emmermann, R., & Wemmer, K. (2001). La Pacana caldera, N. Chile: a re-evaluation of the stratigraphy and volcanology of one of the world's largest resurgent calderas. JOURNAL OF VOLCANOLOGY AND GEOTHERMAL RESEARCH, 106(1–2), 145–173. doi:10.1016/S0377-0273(00)00270-5

Lindsay, J. M., Marzocchi, W., Jolly, G., Constantinescu, R., Selva, J., & Sandri, L. (2010). Towards real-time eruption forecasting in the Auckland Volcanic Field: application of BET_EF during the New Zealand National Disaster Exercise 'Ruaumoko'. Bulletin of Volcanology, 72, 185–204. doi:10.1007/s00445-009-0311-9

Lindsay, J. M., Robertson, R., Shepherd, J., & Ali, S. (2005). Volcanic hazard atlas of the Lesser Antilles. Trinidad and Tobago: Seismic Research Unit, University of the West Indies. Pp 275. ISBN 976-95142-0-9

Needham, A. J., Lindsay, J. M., Smith, I. E. M., Augustinus, P., & Shane, P. A. (2011). Sequential eruption of alkaline and sub-alkaline magmas from a small monogenetic volcano in the Auckland Volcanic Field, New Zealand. Journal of Volcanology and Geothermal Research, 201(1–4), 126–142. doi:10.1016/j.jvolgeores.2010.07.017

Schmitt, A. K., Stockli, D. F., Lindsay, J. M., Robertson, R., Lovera, O. M., & Kislitsyn, R. (2010). Episodic growth and homogenization of plutonic roots in arc volcanoes from combined U-Th and (U-Th)/He zircon dating. Earth and Planetary Science Letters, 295(1–2), 91–103. doi:10.1016/j.epsl.2010.03.028

Thompson MA, Lindsay JM, Gaillard, JC (2015): The influence of probabilistic volcanic hazard map properties on hazard communication. Journal of Applied Volcanology 4:6, doi:10.1186/s13617-015-0023-0
