= Jeff Rowland =

Jeff(rey) or Geoff(rey) Ro(w)land may refer to:

- Jeffrey Rowland (born 1974), creator of the webcomic WIGU
- Jeff Roland (born 16 June 1969), French artist and curator
- Jeff Rowland (soccer) (born 1984), American soccer player
- Geoffrey Rowland, Bailiff of Guernsey, 2005–2012
