= Lorna Rowland =

English/New Zealand journalist

Lorna Waring Rowland (1908– October 1988) was a journalist and writer who was born in England and emigrated to New Zealand.

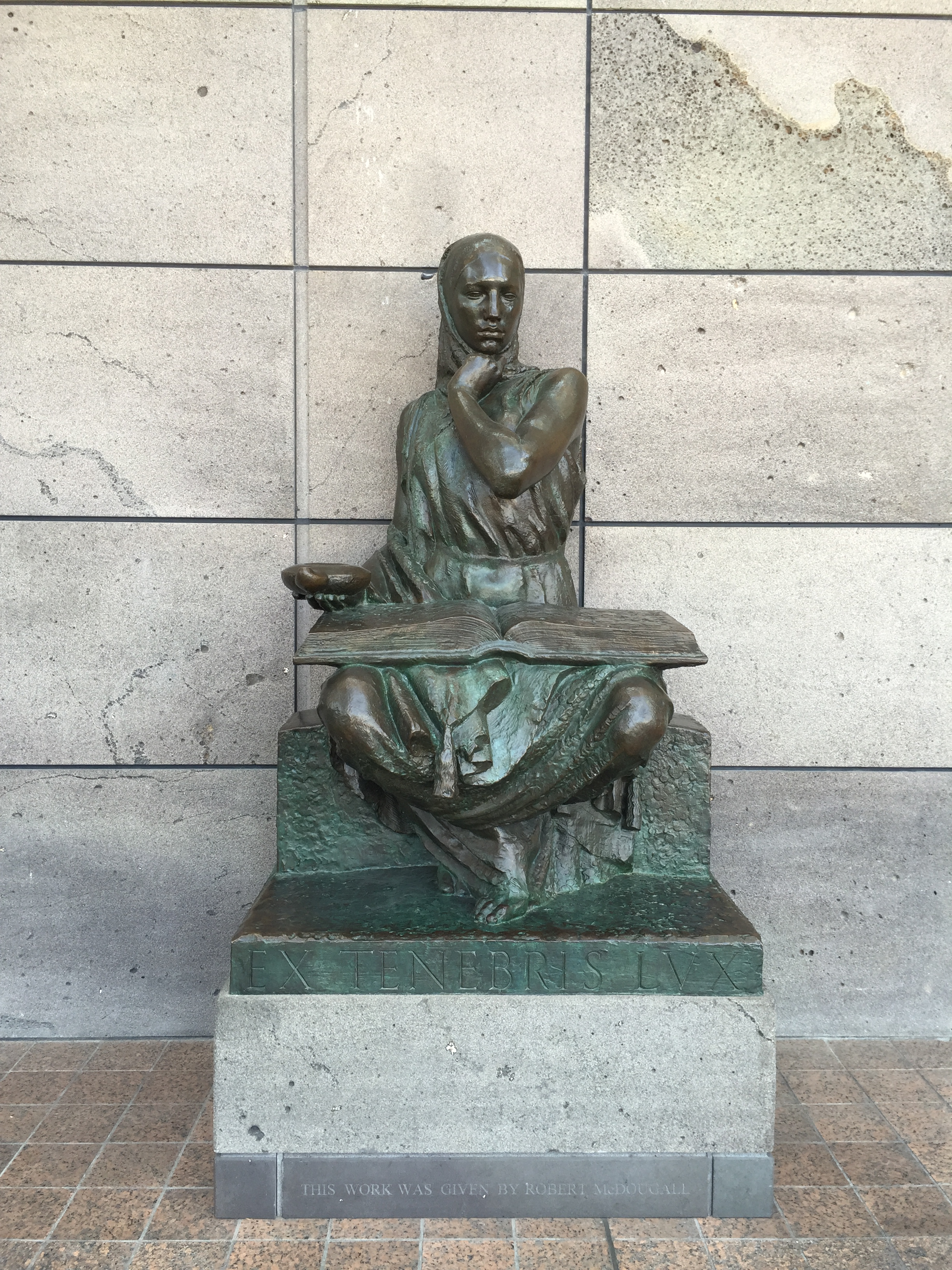
Ex Tenebris Lux, for which Rowland was the model

== Biography ==
Rowland was born in Norfolk, England, to William Domville Rowland and Evelyn Harriet Waring. She sat for artist Ernest Gillick in his Chelsea studio; one of the most notable works she sat for was Gillick's Ex Tenebris Lux, a bronze sculpture purchased by the founding donor of the Robert McDougall Art Gallery (now the Christchurch Art Gallery) and delivered to the gallery in 1938. Other than the period during which the gallery was closed for repairs following the Christchurch earthquakes of 2011, the sculpture has been on permanent public display from 1938 onwards. Rowland also sat for James Quinn, a royal portrait painter, who used her as a model when working on a portrait of the Duchess of York (later Queen Elizabeth The Queen Mother).

She later mocked the stereotype of the artist's model: "Her career is generally pictured by the public as a glamorous whirl through life, to the accompaniment of hectic bottle parties, illicit love-affairs, tinsel and velvet surroundings, and of course, a good deal of nudity."

In 1936 Rowland emigrated to New Zealand and worked as a governess for the McIndoe family in Dunedin. She later moved to Wellington and became a journalist for the New Zealand Free Lance. She also had columns in The Dominion and Truth newspapers. Much of her writing was on travel and she took her own photographs to supplement her articles, travelling to Stewart Island as well as extensively across both the North and South Islands. In the 1950s she travelled in Australia and published pieces of travel writing in New Zealand papers; she also reported on the 1954 Royal Tour of Australia.

In her retirement Rowland explored her love of gardening, particularly herb gardening. She established the Wellington Herb Society and edited a journal for the members. She wrote a book Growing Herbs (published in 1979) and successfully campaigned in Wellington to establish a herb garden in the city.
