= Lazarillo de Tormes =

16th-century Spanish picaresque novella

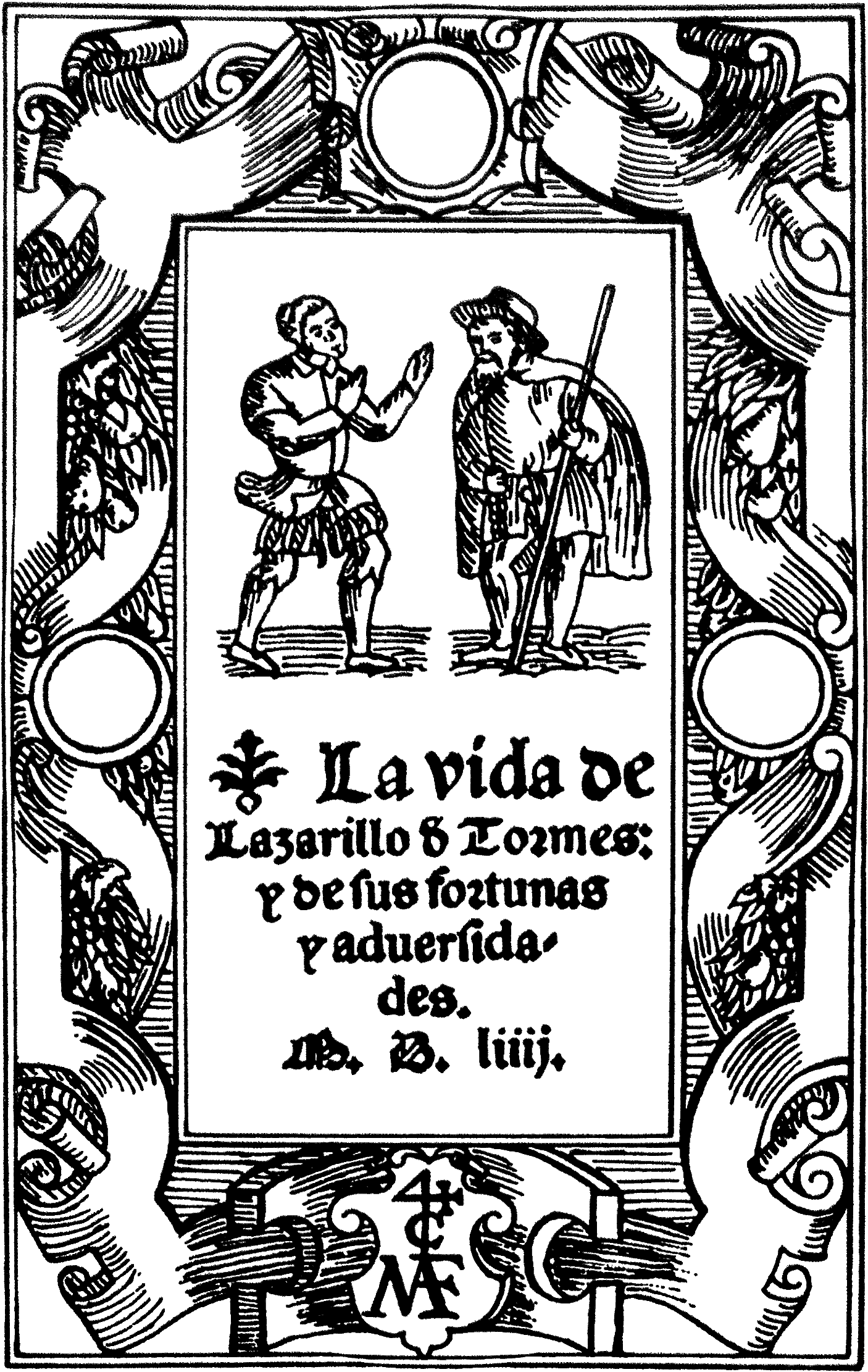
- Title page of the 1554 edition printed in Medina del Campo by Mateo and Francisco del Canto
- Author: anonymous
- Original title: La vida de Lazarillo de Tormes y de sus fortunas y adversidades
- Language: Spanish
- Genre: Picaresque
- Publication date: 1554
- Publication place: Spain, Spanish Netherlands
- Media type: Print (Hardback & Paperback)

The Life of Lazarillo de Tormes and of His Fortunes and Adversities (Spanish: La vida de Lazarillo de Tormes y de sus fortunas y adversidades; [la ˈβiða ðe laθaˈɾiʎo ðe ˈtoɾmes i ðe sus foɾˈtunas jaðβeɾsiˈðaðes]) is a Spanish novella, published anonymously because of its anticlerical content. The oldest editions were published in 1554 in four locations: Alcalá de Henares, Burgos, and Medina del Campo in Spain and Antwerp in the Spanish Netherlands. It is assumed that it is not the original edition of the novella, since scholars believe that a now-lost original may have preceded it. The Alcalá de Henares edition adds some episodes that a second author most likely wrote. Lazarillo de Tormes is the first book establishing the style of the picaresque satirical novel.

== Summary ==
Lázaro is a boy of humble origins from Salamanca. After his stepfather is accused of thievery, his mother asks a wily blind beggar to take on Lazarillo (little Lázaro) as his apprentice. Lázaro develops his cunning while serving the blind beggar and several other masters, and also learns to take up his father's practice.

Table of contents:

- Prologue
- Chapter 1: childhood and apprenticeship to a blind man.
  - Lazarillo is from a humble family and his father works at a sawmill; he is given the surname Tormes because of the river Tormes near which he was born.
  - Lazarillo father is accused of stealing and sent to the military where he eventually dies in a battle.
  - Lazarillo's mother then obtains another lover, a black man who steals to support their family. When his master gets suspicious, soldiers question the young Lazarillo who innocently details the moor's thievery. The moor is lashed and whipped.
  - His mother asks a blind beggar to take on Lazarillo who is cruel and mistreats Lazarillo.
  - Lazarillo is forced to steal food and wine from the blind man and often gets caught and receives punishment.
  - After one especially painful punishment, Lazarillo tricks the blind man into hitting a stone pillar and leaves him.
- Chapter 2: serving a priest.
  - In Chapter 2, Lazarillo finds a new master, a priest from Manqueda who feeds Lazarillo even less than the blind man. He keeps his bread in a strong wood chest.
  - Lazarillo trades a loaf of bread for the key to the chest from a travelling tinker.
  - Lazarillo steals from the priest's chest, chipping away wood tricking the priest into thinking mice are causing the damage.
  - After the priest plugs the holes, he creates new ones and the priest concludes that a snake must be slithering in.
  - Lazarillo hides his stolen key from his master in his mouth and accidentally makes a whistling sound which his master supposes to be a snake.
  - His master hits the "snake" in the night and hurts Lazarillo realizing the tricks Lazarillo used.
  - Lazarillo is injured for three days and heals up and then clergyman sends him out of his house.
- Chapter 3: serving a squire.
- Chapter 4: serving a friar.
- Chapter 5: serving a pardoner.
- Chapter 6: serving a chaplain.
- Chapter 7: serving a pardoner and an archpriest.

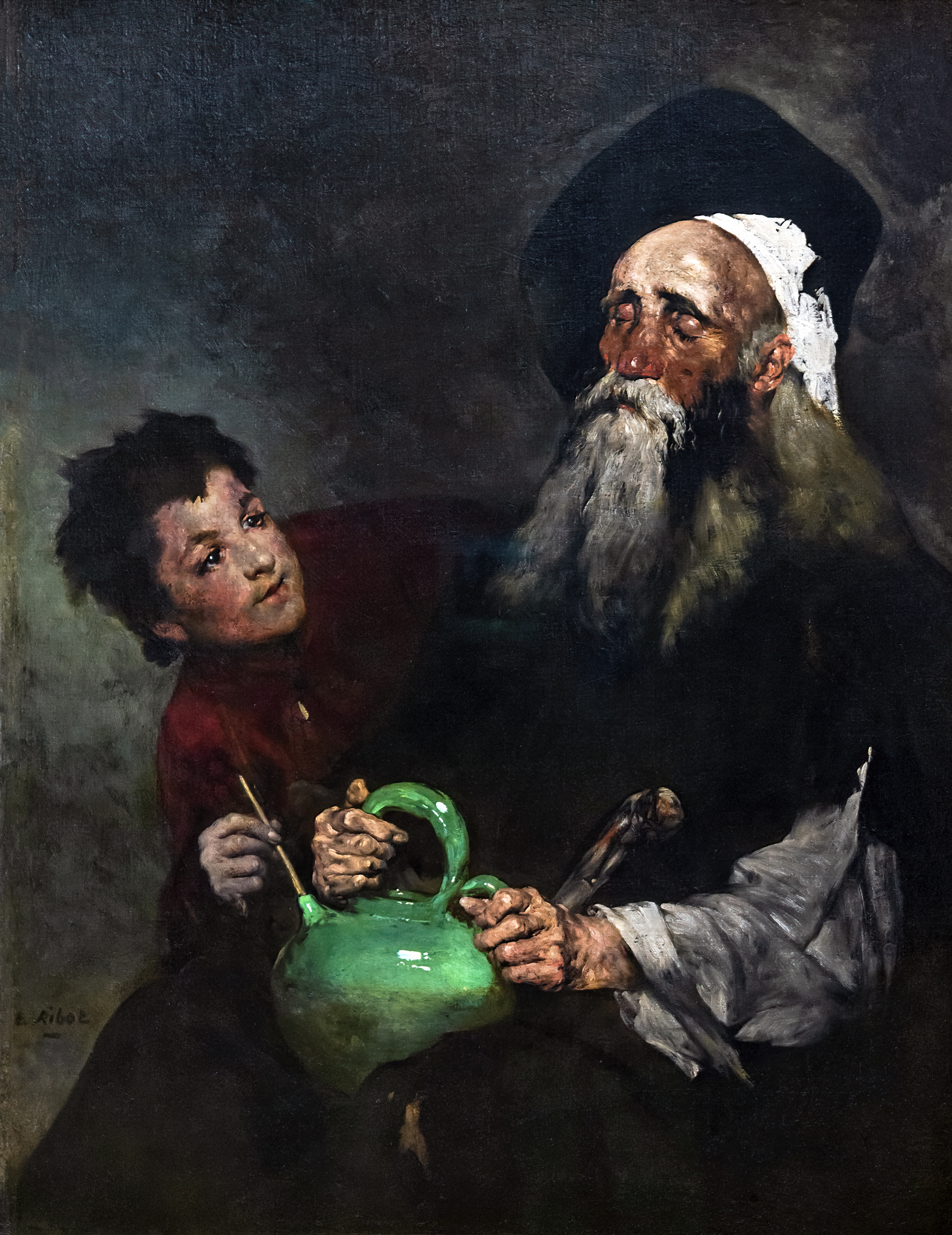
Lazarillo de Tormes and his blind master by Théodule Ribot (Cleveland Museum of Art)

== Importance as a novella ==
Besides its importance in the Spanish literature of the Golden Age, Lazarillo de Tormes is credited with founding a literary genre, the picaresque novel, from the Spanish word pícaro, meaning "rogue" or "rascal." In novels of this type, the adventures of the pícaro expose injustice while amusing the reader. This extensive genre includes Cervantes' Rinconete y Cortadillo and El coloquio de los perros, Henry Fielding's Tom Jones and Mark Twain's Adventures of Huckleberry Finn. Its influence extends to twentieth-century novels, dramas, and films featuring the antihero.

== Prohibition ==
Lazarillo de Tormes was banned by the Spanish Crown and included in the Index of Forbidden Books of the Spanish Inquisition; this was at least in part due to the book's anti-clerical flavor. In 1573, the Crown allowed the circulation of a version which omitted Chapters 4 and 5 and assorted paragraphs from other parts of the book. An unabridged version did not appear in Spain until the nineteenth century. It was the Antwerp version that circulated throughout Europe, translated into French (1560), English (1576), Dutch (after the northern, largely Protestant Seven Provinces of the Low Countries revolted against Spain in 1579), German (1617), and Italian (1622).

Spanish first edition title pages in 1554 of Lazarillo de Tormes.

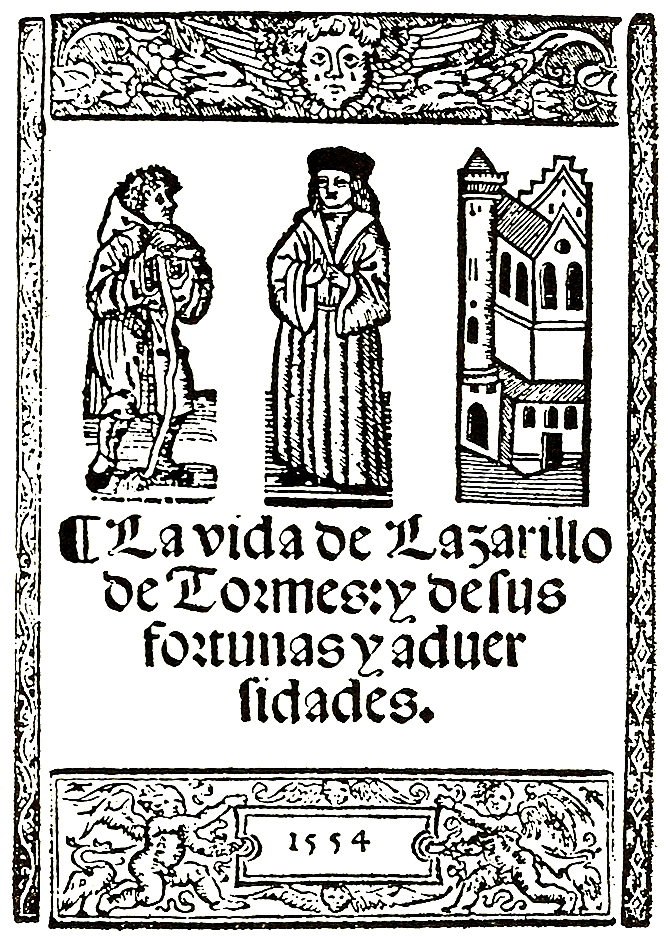
Burgos, Juan de Junta

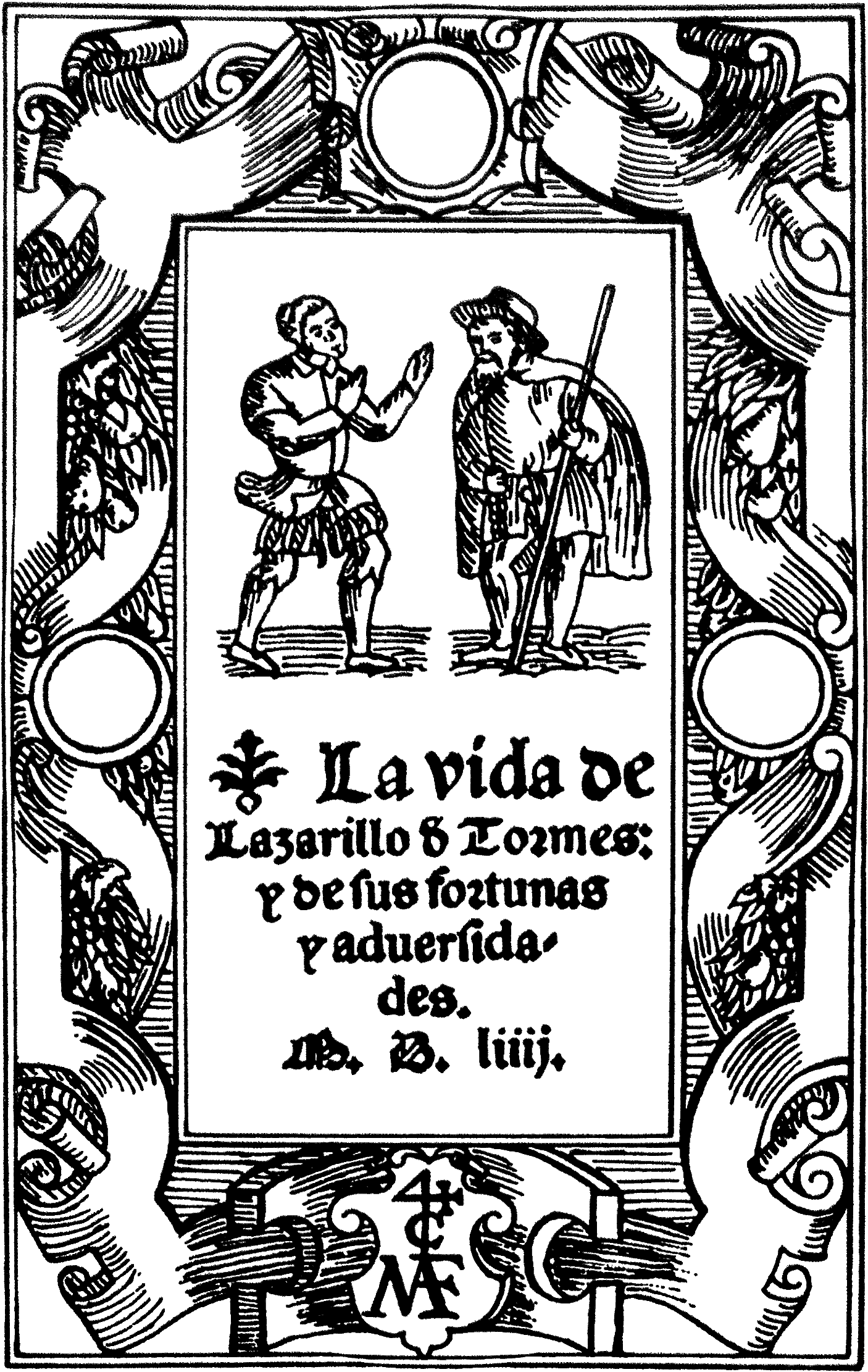
Medina del Campo, Mateo and Francisco del Canto

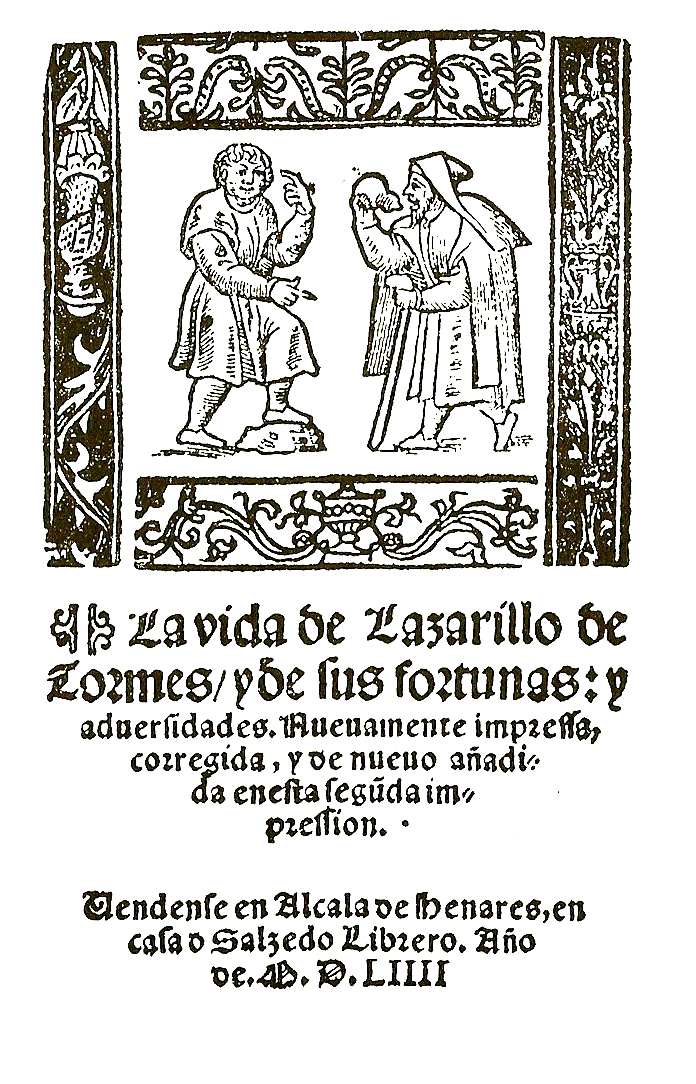
Alcalá de Henares, Salcedo

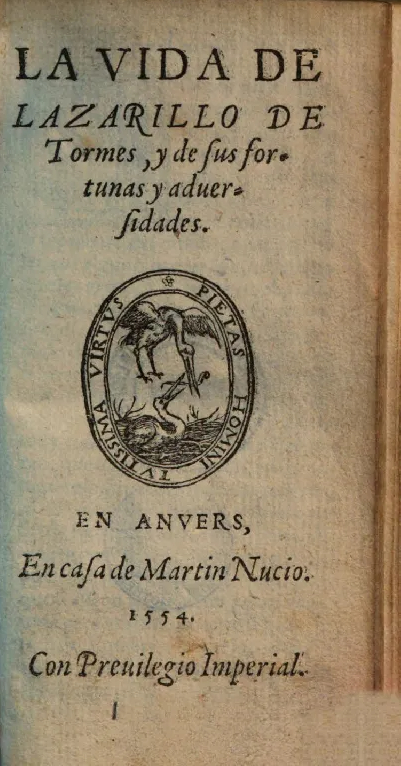
Antwerp, Martín Nucio (Martinus Nutius)

== Literary significance and criticism ==
The primary objections to Lazarillo had to do with its vivid and realistic descriptions of the world of the pauper and the petty thief. The "worm's eye view" of society contrasted sharply with the more conventional literary focus on superhuman exploits recounted in chivalric romances such as the hugely popular Amadís de Gaula. In Antwerp, it followed the tradition of the impudent trickster figure Till Eulenspiegel.

Lazarillo introduced the picaresque device of delineating various professions and levels of society. A young man or woman describes masters or "betters" with ingenuously presented realistic details. But Lazarillo speaks of "the blind man," "the squire," "the pardoner," presenting these characters as types.

Significantly, the only named characters are Lazarillo and his family: his mother Antona Pérez, his father Tomé Gonzáles, and his stepfather El Zayde. The surname de Tormes comes from the river Tormes. In the narrative, Lazarillo explains that his father ran a mill on the river, where he was literally born on the river. The Tormes runs through Lazarillo's hometown, Tejares, a then small village, now a neighborhood in Salamanca, a Castilian-Leonese university city. (There is an old mill on the river, and a statue of Lazarillo and the blind man next to the Roman bridge [puente romano] in the city.)

Lazarillo is the diminutive of the Spanish name Lázaro. There are two appearances of the name Lazarus in the Bible, and not all critics agree as to which story the author was referring when he chose the name. The more well-known tale is in John 11 (John 11:41–44), in which Jesus raises Lazarus from the dead. The second is in Luke 16 (Luke 16:19–31), a parable about a beggar named Lazarus at the gate of a stingy rich man's house.

In contrast to the fancifully poetic language devoted to fantastic and supernatural events about unbelievable creatures and chivalric knights, the realistic prose of Lazarillo described suppliants purchasing indulgences from the Church, servants forced to die with their masters on the battlefield (as Lazarillo's father did), thousands of refugees wandering from town to town, poor beggars flogged away by whips because of the lack of food. The anonymous author included many popular sayings and ironically interpreted popular stories.

The Prologue with Lázaro's extensive protest against injustice is addressed to a high-level cleric, and five of his eight masters in the novel serve the church. Lazarillo attacks the appearance of the church and its hypocrisy, though not its essential beliefs, a balance not often present in following picaresque novels.

Besides creating a new genre, Lazarillo de Tormes was critically innovative in world literature in several aspects:

1. Long before Emile (Jean-Jacques Rousseau), Oliver Twist (Charles Dickens) or Adventures of Huckleberry Finn, the anonymous author of Lazarillo treated a boy as a boy, not a small adult.
2. Long before Moll Flanders (Daniel Defoe), Lazarillo describes the domestic and working life of a poor woman, wife, mother, climaxing in the flogging of Lazarillo's mother through the streets of the town after her black husband Zayde is soundly flogged and his flesh tickled with drops of scalding fat as the punishment for thievery.
3. Long before modern treatment of "persons of color", this author treats the pleasures and pains of an interracial family in his descriptions of life with his black stepfather and negrito half-brother, though their characterization is based on stereotypes of the period.

== Reference in Don Quixote ==
In his book Don Quixote, Cervantes introduces a gypsy thief called Ginés de Pasamonte who claims to be a writer (and who later in Part II masquerades as a puppeteer while on the run). Don Quixote interrogates this writer about his book:

"Is it so good?" said Don Quixote.

"So good is it," replied Gines, "that a fig for 'Lazarillo de Tormes,' and all of that kind that have been written, or shall be written compared with it: all I will say about it is that it deals with facts, and facts so neat and diverting that no lies could match them."

"And how is the book entitled?" asked Don Quixote.

"The Life of Ginés de Pasamonte," replied the subject of it.

"And is it finished?" asked Don Quixote.

"How can it be finished," said the other, "when my life is not yet finished?"

— Don Quixote

== Social criticism ==
The author criticises many organisations and groups in his book, most notably the Catholic Church and the Spanish aristocracy.

These two groups are clearly criticised through the different masters that Lazarillo serves. Characters such as the Cleric, the Friar, the Pardoner, the Priest and the Archbishop all have something wrong either with them as a person or with their character. The self-indulgent cleric concentrates on feeding himself, and when he does decide to give the "crumbs from his table" to Lazarillo, he says, "toma, come, triunfa, para ti es el mundo" ("take, eat, triumph – the world is yours"), a clear parody of a key communion statement.

In Chapter 3, Lazarillo becomes the servant of a Squire. The Squire openly flaunts his wealth despite not being able to feed himself, let alone Lázaro. This is a parody of the importance of having a strong image among the nobility.

In Chapter 4, Lazarillo mentions his stay with a friar who gave him his first pair of shoes which he broke due to extreme use. The friar is described as disliking normal church activities: staying in a convent, and monastic duties serving as criticism of religious figures who broke their vows. Furthermore, Lazarillo's phrase "por otras cosillas que no digo" where he chooses to leave out much of his adventures is interpreted as a sexual euphemism, criticizing monks who choose to ignore celibacy.

In Chapter 5, Lazarillo demonstrates the corruption among pardoners at the time. The pardoner stages a fake miracle along with the town sherrif to fool the townspeople into buying indulgences. This is a condemnation of the law and religion working in accordance to fool and trick people.

In the final chapter, Lazarillo works for an Archpriest, who arranges his marriage to the Archpriest's maid. It is clear that Lazarillo's wife cheats on him with the Archpriest, and all vows of celibacy are forgotten.

== Authorship ==
The identity of the author of Lazarillo has been a puzzle for nearly four hundred years. Given the subversive nature of Lazarillo and its open criticism of the Catholic Church, it is likely that the author chose to remain anonymous out of fear of religious persecution.

Neither the author nor the date and place of the first appearance of the work is known. It appeared anonymously, and no author's name was accredited to it until 1605, when the Hieronymite monk José de Sigüenza named as its author Fray Juan de Ortega. Two years later, it was accredited by the Belgian Valère André to Diego Hurtado de Mendoza. In 1608, André Schott repeated this assertion, although less categorically. The earliest known editions are the four of Alcalá de Henares, Antwerp, Medina del Campo, and Burgos, all of which appeared in 1554. Two continuations (or second parts) appeared – one, anonymously, in 1555, and the other, accredited to H. Luna, in 1620.

There has been some suggestion that the author was originally of Jewish extraction, but in 1492 had had to convert to Catholicism to avoid being expelled from Spain; that might explain the animosity towards the Catholic Church displayed in the book. Apart from the chronological difficulties this hypothesis presents, Catholic criticism of Catholic clergy, including the Pope, had had a long and even reputable tradition that can be seen in the works of famous Catholic writers such as Chaucer, Dante, or Erasmus.

Documents brought to light by the Spanish palaeographer Mercedes Agulló in 2010 support the hypothesis that the author was, in fact, Diego Hurtado de Mendoza. In 2023, researchers Mariano Calvo and José María Martínez have proposed and documented that the most likely author of "El Lazarillo" might be Juan de Valdés. They found their hypothesis on biographical, historical and linguistic recurrences between "El Lazarillo" and Valdes' works, and specially, Valdés' Diálogo de la lengua.

== Sequels ==
In 1555, only a year after the first edition of the book, a sequel by another anonymous author was attached to the original Lazarillo in an edition printed in Antwerp, Low Countries. This sequel is known as El Lazarillo de Amberes, Amberes being the Spanish name for Antwerp.

Lázaro leaves his wife and child with the priest, in Toledo, and joins the Spanish army in their campaign against the Moors. The ship carrying the soldiers sinks, but before it does, Lázaro drinks as much wine as he can. His body is so full of wine that there is no place for the water to enter him, and by that means, he survives under the sea. Threatened by the tuna fish there, Lázaro prays for mercy and is eventually metamorphosed into a tuna himself. Most of the book tells about how Lázaro struggles to find his place in tuna society.

In 1620, another sequel, by Juan de Luna, appeared in Paris. In the prologue, the narrator (not Lázaro himself but someone who claims to have a copy of Lázaro's writings) tells the reader that he was moved to publish the second part of Lázaro's adventures after hearing about a book which, he alleges, had falsely told of Lázaro being transformed into a tuna (obviously a disparaging reference to Lazarillo de Amberes).

== Adaptations ==
- 1617: a play Spaansche Brabander by Gerbrand Adriaenszoon Bredero.
- 1959: a film adaptation El Lazarillo de Tormes, film director César Fernández Ardavín, which won the Golden Bear at the Berlin Film Festival.
- 1973: a Soviet Georgian adaptation The Adventures of Lazare (ლაზარეს თავგადასავალი / Приключения Лазаре) by Ramaz Khotivari.
- 1987: a loose film adaptation The Rogues, film director Mario Monicelli.
- 2001: a film adaptation Lázaro de Tormes, film directors Fernando Fernán Gómez, José Luis García Sánchez.
- 2015: animation adaptation, El Lazarillo de Tormes, film director Pedro Alonso Pablos.

== Non-literary influence ==
Because of Lazarillo's first adventures, the Spanish word lazarillo has taken on the meaning "guide", as to a blind person. Consequently, in Spanish, a guide dog is still informally called a perro lazarillo, as it was called before perro guía became common.

== Translations into English ==
- David Rowland (1586)
- Anonymous translator, printed for R. Bonwick (1708; revised in 1726 and 1745)
- W. S. Merwin (1962)
- Michael Alpert (1969)
- Robert S. Rudder (1973)
- Alfonso J. García Osuna (2005)
- Ilan Stavans (2016)
