= John Rowland =

John Rowland may refer to:

- Bo Rowland (1903–1964), American football player and coach, basketball player
- John A. Rowland (1791–1873), California pioneer
- John G. Rowland (born 1957), American (former) Governor of Connecticut
- John Sharpe Rowland (1798–1863), 19th-century American politician
- John Rowland (diplomat) (1925–1996), Australian diplomat
- John Rowland (footballer, born 1936) (1936–2002), Welsh footballer
- John Rowland (footballer, born 1941) (1941–2020), English footballer
- John Cambrian Rowland (1819–1890), Welsh painter
- John T. Rowland (1871–1945), American architect
- John Rowland (MP), represented Winchelsea

== Characters ==
- John Rowland (Desperate Housewives), character in the U.S. television series Desperate Housewives
- John Rowland: the main protagonist in the 1898 novella The Wreck of the Titan: Or, Futility by Morgan Robertson

== See also ==
- John Roland (1941–2023), American news presenter and reporter
- John Rowlands (disambiguation)
