= Henry Rowland-Brown =

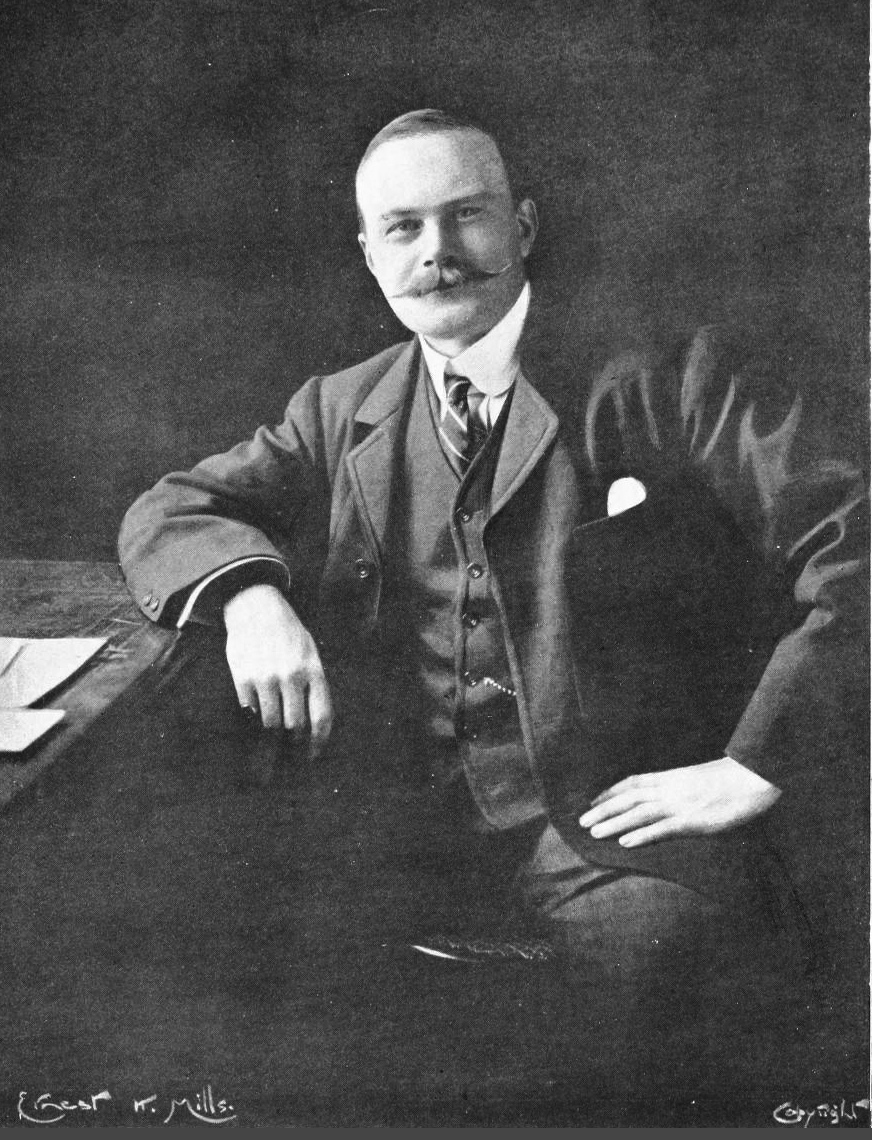

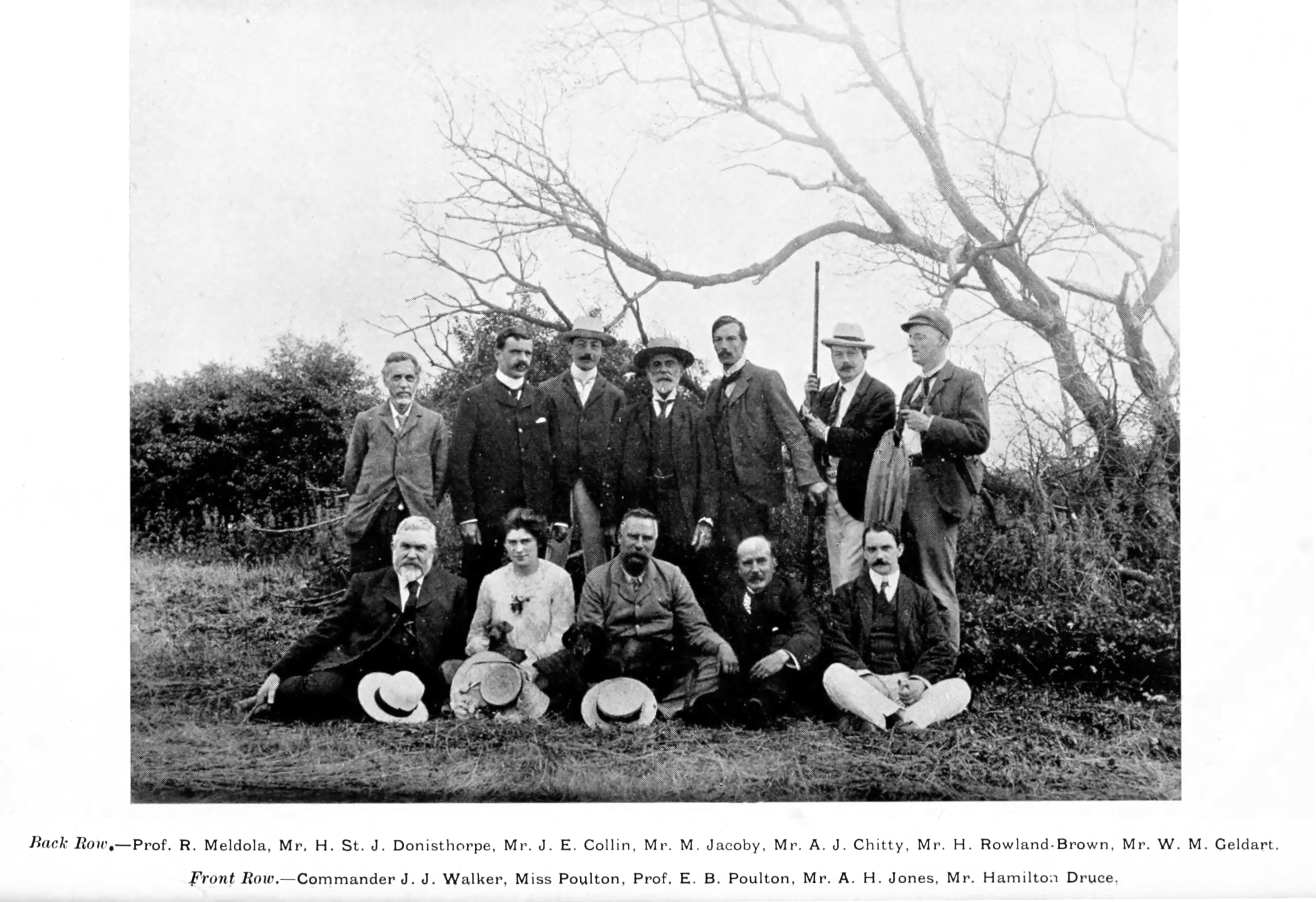
Rowland-Brown with the Entomological Society in 1904 (standing, 2nd from right)

Henry Rowland-Brown (19 May 1865, Woodridings, Pinner – 23 May 1922, Harrow Weald, London) was an English entomologist who specialised in Lepidoptera.

Henry was the son of barrister Henry Rowland Brown (1837-1921) and Kate or Catherine Tucker Woodgates (d. 1923). (Note: Henry Rowland Brown (sr.) born in Lyme was among the first to write about the contributions of the amateur fossil hunter Mary Anning in his guidebook Beauties of Lyme Regis and Charmouth. (1859).) Henry (jr.) went to study at Rugby in 1879 where he was influenced by the hymenopterist Rev. F.D. Morice, before graduating in 1883 He then went to Oxford receiving a BA in 1887 and an MA in 1891. He took an interest in the lepidoptera and was a regular visitor at the Hope Museum. He then studied law and was called to the bar in 1889. By profession Rowland-Brown was a journalist and author. He wrote "The distribution and variation of Coenonympha tullia in the UK", which was published in Etudes de Lépidoptérologie comparée, Volume 7, Ed by Oberthür, C., 85-193 (1919) (Oberthür was a personal friend), several scientific papers on Colias croceus and the popular work Butterflies and Moths at Home and Abroad. London, 1912. He was a fellow of the Royal Entomological Society and a member of the Garrick and Savage Clubs. He also wrote to various magazines such as the Strand, Cornhill, and the Times sometimes under the pen-name "Oliver Grey" while his sister Lilian Kate Rowland Brown (1863–1959), also a noted novelist wrote as "Rowland Grey." He also wrote some poetry. He was a close friend of W.S. Gilbert.
