= David Rowland (translator) =

Welsh author and translator (fl. 1569–1586)

David Rowland (fl. 1569–1586) was a Welsh author, best known as the translator of Lazarillo de Tormes.

== Life ==
A native of Anglesey, he entered St. Mary's Hall, Oxford, and studied logic and grammar, but did not take a degree. On leaving university he became tutor to Charles Stuart, the son of Matthew Stewart, 4th Earl of Lennox, and with him travelled through France and Spain. After his return he became a teacher of Greek and Latin in London.

== Works ==
In 1569 Rowland published An Epytaphe of my Lorde of Pembroke, licensed to Thomas Colwell. For the use of his pupils he also wrote A Comfortable Aid for Scholers, London, 1578, a collection of renderings of English phrases in Latin. It was based on a work of Giovanni Andrea Grifoni.

Rowland's major work was the translation of the first part of Lazarillo de Tormes, which he published under the title of The Pleasant History of Lazarillo de Tormes. The translation was influenced by the earlier French version of Jean Saugrain. It was itself an influence on English theatre, with the 1603 play Labyrinthus of Walter Hawkesworth combining a plot of Giambattista della Porta with a subplot from the book; and possibly on William Shakespeare and Edmund Spenser.

The translation appeared in 1576, printed by Henry Bynneman and with a dedication to Sir Thomas Gresham, but it had apparently been licensed by 1568 to Colwell. No copy of the first edition is extant. Another edition of 1586, London, contains laudatory verses by George Turberville. The Spanish original was imperfect, having been expurgated. The translation ran through several editions, the last being that of 1677, which was supplemented by a translation of the second part of the history by James Blakeston. An earlier translation of the second part was by William Phiston. Rowland's translation was superseded in 1708 by an anonymous translation into more modern English.

== Notes ==
Attribution

This article incorporates text from a publication now in the public domain: Lee, Sidney, ed. (1897). "Rowland, David". Dictionary of National Biography. Vol. 49. London: Smith, Elder & Co.
