= Henry Augustus Rowland =

American physicist (1848–1901)

Henry Augustus Rowland ForMemRS HonFRSE
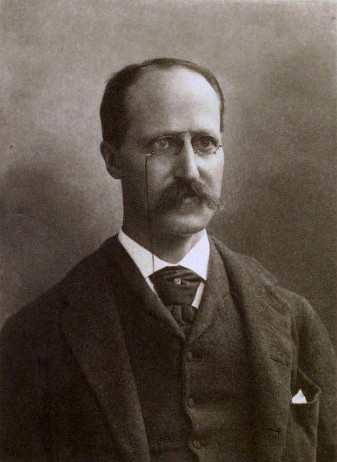
- Born: November 27, 1848; Honesdale, Pennsylvania, U.S.
- Died: April 16, 1901 (aged 52); Baltimore, Maryland, U.S.
- Education: Rensselaer Polytechnic Institute
- Known for: Diffraction grating Rowland circle Rowland ring
- Awards: Rumford Prize (1883); Henry Draper Medal (1890); Matteucci Medal (1895)
- Scientific career
- Fields: Physicist
- Workplaces: University of Wooster; Rensselaer Polytechnic Institute; Johns Hopkins University
- Academic advisors: Hermann von Helmholtz
- Doctoral students: Joseph Sweetman Ames; Louis Bell; Edwin Hall; William Jackson Humphreys; Charles Elwood Mendenhall; Harry Fielding Reid; Albert Francis Zahm

Henry Augustus Rowland (November 27, 1848 – April 16, 1901) was an American physicist and Johns Hopkins educator. Between 1899 and 1901 he served as the first president of the American Physical Society. He is remembered for the high quality of the diffraction gratings he made and for the work he did with them on the solar spectrum.

== Early life, family and education ==
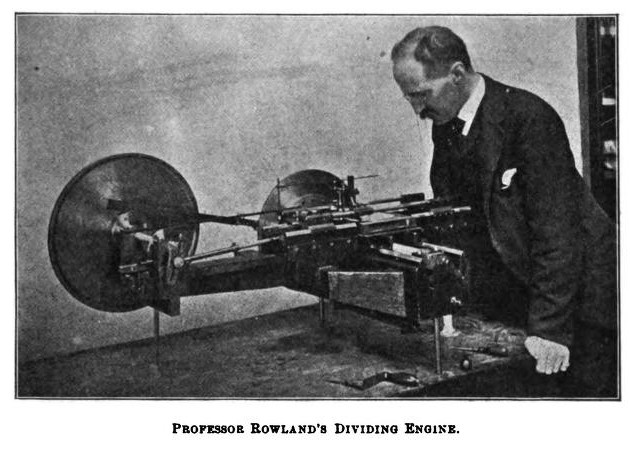
Rowland with his dividing machine

Rowland was born in Honesdale, Pennsylvania, where his father Henry Augustus Rowland was a Presbyterian pastor. His mother, Harriette Heyer, the daughter of a wealthy New York merchant, was of Knickerbocker descent. From an early age, the younger Rowland exhibited marked scientific tastes and spent his spare time in electrical and chemical experiments.

He graduated from Rensselaer Polytechnic Institute in Troy, New York in 1870.

== Career ==
After college, Rowland worked for the Western New York railway, but he did not like the work. He became an instructor in natural science at the University of Wooster in Wooster, Ohio. He resigned in order to return to Troy as assistant professor of physics at Rensselaer.

Rowland was considered one of the most brilliant American scientists of his day. However, initially his merits were not perceived in his own country. He was unable to secure the publication of many of his early scientific papers; but James Clerk Maxwell at once saw their excellence, and had them printed in Philosophical Magazine. When the managers of Johns Hopkins University in Baltimore, Maryland, asked advice in Europe as to whom they should make their professor of physics, Rowland was overwhelmingly recommended as the best choice. In 1876, he became the first occupant of the chair of physics at Johns Hopkins University, a position which he retained until his death in Baltimore on April 16, 1901.

In the interval between his selection to Johns Hopkins and the assumption of his duties there, he studied physics under Hermann von Helmholtz in Berlin (1875–76), and carried out a well-known research on the effect of an electrically charged body in motion, showing it to give rise to a magnetic field.

After settling in Baltimore, Rowland focused on two important pieces of work. One was a redetermination of the ohm. For this he obtained a value which was substantially different from that ascertained by the committee of the British Association appointed for the purpose, but ultimately he had the satisfaction of seeing his own result accepted as the more correct of the two. The other was a new determination of the mechanical equivalent of heat. In this he used J. P. Joule's paddle-wheel method, though with many improvements, the whole apparatus being on a larger scale and the experiments being conducted over a wider range of temperature. He obtained a result distinctly higher than Joule's final figure. Additionally, he made many valuable observations on the thermodynamics involved, and on the variation of the specific heat of water, which Joule had assumed to be the same at all temperatures.

In 1882, before the Physical Society of London, Rowland gave a description of the diffraction gratings, with which his name is specially associated, (Note: He was so closely associated with diffraction gratings that his 1897 portrait by Thomas Eakins shows him holding one in his hand.) and which have been of enormous advantage to astronomical spectroscopy. These gratings consist of pieces of metal or glass ruled by means of a diamond point with a very large number of parallel lines, on the extreme accuracy of which their efficiency depends. For their production, therefore, dividing engines of extraordinary trueness and delicacy were required, and in the construction of such machines Rowland's engineering skill brought him conspicuous success. The results of his labors may be found in the elaborate Photographic Map of the Normal Solar Spectrum (1888) and the Table of Solar Wave-Lengths (1898).

In his later years, Rowland was engaged in developing a system of multiplex telegraphy. He authored A Plea for Pure Science, in 1883 an important document for the understanding of the relationship between science in university and in commercial contexts in the late nineteenth and early twentieth century.

== Honors and awards ==
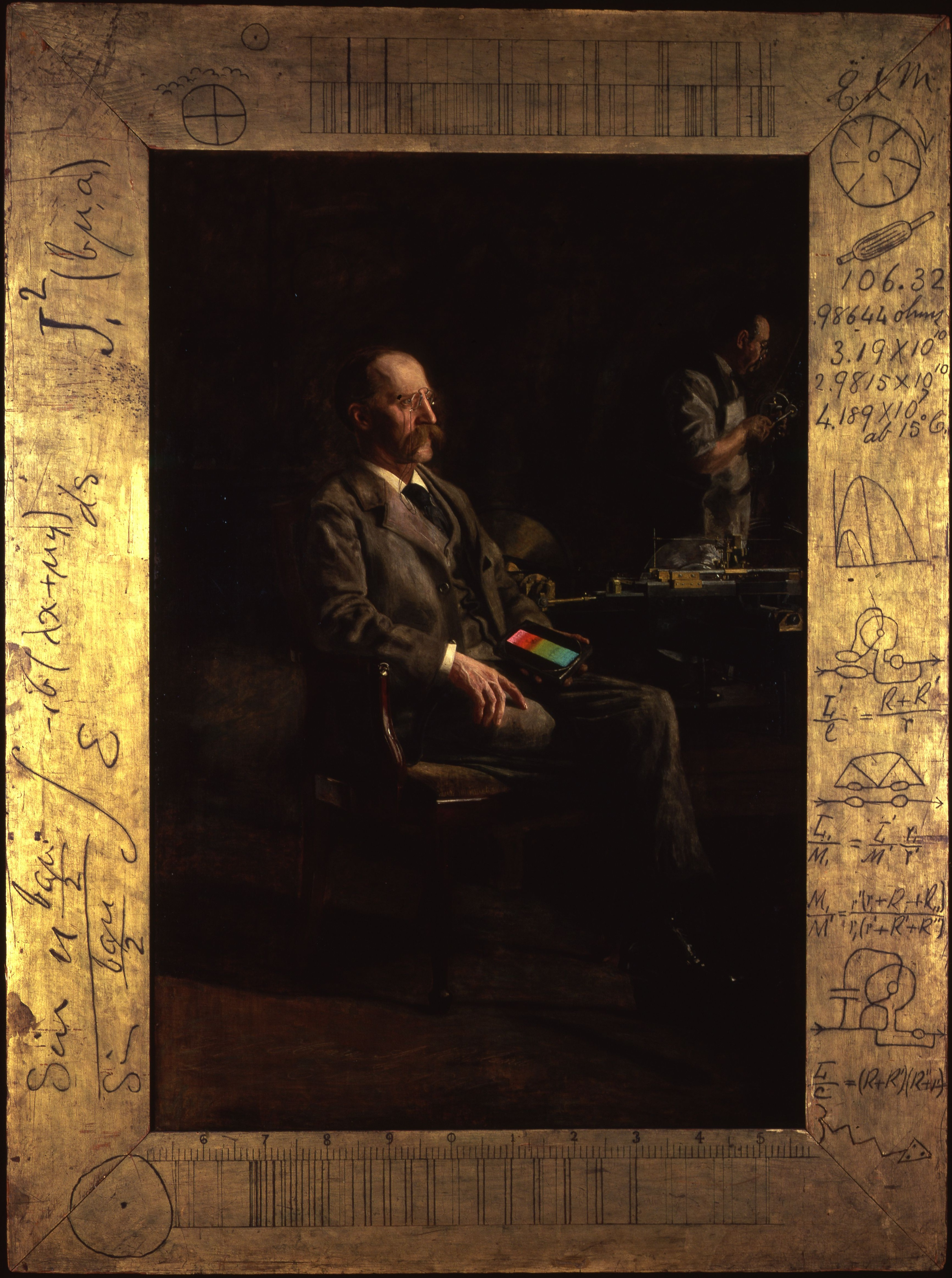
Rowland holding a diffraction grating by Thomas Eakins (1897)

Rowland was elected to the American Academy of Arts and Sciences in 1876. The National Academy of Sciences, of which Rowland was a member, awarded him the Henry Draper Medal in 1890 for his contributions to astrophysics, he was elected to honorary membership of the Manchester Literary and Philosophical Society, in 1894. He won the Matteucci Medal in 1895. In 1896, he was elected to the American Philosophical Society. Also, the Henry August Rowland House in Baltimore was designated a National Historic Landmark.

== See also ==
- History of the Tesla coil
- Hopkinson's law
- Magnetomotive force
- Magnetic reluctance
- X-ray emission spectroscopy
- X-ray fluorescence
