= Jim Rowlands =

Welsh singer-songwriter (born 1972)

James Rowlands
- Also known as: Jim
- Born: January 27, 1972 (age 54)
- Occupations: Songwriter; Producer; Teacher

Jim Rowlands (born 27 January 1972) is a Welsh singer, songwriter, and author who lives in Loyat, Brittany, France, where he serves as a town councillor in the opposition. Over a career spanning more than 30 years, Rowlands has toured France extensively to promote Welsh music and culture, performing at major venues and festivals including the Printemps de Bourges, the Stade de France, and the Cirque Bouglione.

== Musical career ==
Rowlands has recorded numerous albums featuring his signature Welsh Celtic style. In 1999, he released the album Gobaith on the SMC label, followed by Pasbort in 2001. Pasbort was distributed in Wales via SAIN and featured the radio single "Cysgu Tawel". His track "And I've Seen" remains one of his most enduring compositions.

In 2004, his music was featured on an English-language BBC radio program, and he is cataloged as a featured artist by BBC Radio Cymru. He also composed and performed the score for The Naked Isle, a documentary focusing on British prisoners of war.

Between 1997 and 2020, Rowlands performed regularly in collaboration with harpist Hywel John and with the folk-rock group Mirrorfield. With Mirrorfield, he toured South Korea and opened for Deep Purple. Following the COVID-19 pandemic, he transitioned primarily to performing as a solo artist.

His back catalog has seen modern updates, including the remastered releases of Stranded (2015) and The Night Watchmen (2017). His subsequent studio album, Beirdd do Mar, synthesizes Welsh and Portuguese musical traditions. In November 2025, Rowlands premiered a Bob Dylan tribute program .

== Recent projects and events ==
On 18 March 2023, Rowlands performed the Welsh national anthem, Hen Wlad Fy Nhadau, before a crowd of 80,000 spectators at the Stade de France preceding the France v Wales 6 Nations rugby match.

In 2025, he began publishing a serialized weekly audiobook titled Hoose, establishing a semi-fictional setting that acts as the backdrop for his broader literary portfolio, which includes novels, short stories, poetry, and theater.

In March 2026, he was invited by the Welsh Government to perform at the Saint David's Day celebrations held in Rennes, Brittany . He is scheduled as an official billing at the Festival Interceltique de Lorient on 6 and 7 August 2026 .
