= Marcus Rowland =

Marcus Rowland may refer to:

- Marcus Rowland (author) (born 1953), British author
- Marcus Rowland (athlete) (born 1990), American athlete
