= Steve Rowland =

Steve Rowland may refer to:

- Steve Rowland (record producer) (born 1932), American singer, columnist, record producer and actor
- Steve Rowland (footballer) (born 1981), Welsh footballer
