= Daniel Rowland (antiquary) =

English antiquarian

- Born: 11 July 1778; Shrewsbury
- Died: 20 October 1859 (aged 81)
- Occupation: Antiquarian

Daniel Rowland (11 July 1778 – 20 October 1859) was an English antiquarian.

== Biography ==
Rowland was born at Shrewsbury on 11 July 1778. He was the second surviving son of John Rowland or Rowlands (d. 1815), rector of Llangeitho, Cardiganshire, and incumbent of Clive, Shropshire, by Mary, daughter of William Gorsuch, vicar of the Abbey parish, Shrewsbury. His paternal grandfather was Daniel Rowland. William Gorsuch Rowland (d. 1851), his eldest brother, was prebendary of Lichfield and incumbent of St. Mary's, Shrewsbury; he spent much money in beautifying his church, more especially by the gift of some fine stained-glass windows.

Rowland, after being educated at Shrewsbury, practised for some years as a barrister in London. He subsequently removed to Frant in Sussex, where he built Saxonbury Lodge in mediæval style (Lower, Sussex, i. 192). He devoted his leisure to literature, the fine arts, and philanthropy. At Shrewsbury he built and endowed in 1853, at a cost of over 4,000l., the Hospital of the Holy Cross, for five poor women. He was high sheriff of Sussex in 1824. In 1846 he returned to London, settling at 28 Grosvenor Place. He died at Clifton on 20 Oct. 1859, and was buried in the crypt of the chapel of the Foundling Hospital, Guildford Street, London, of which he had been a governor. He married, in 1818, Katherine Erskine, daughter of Pelham Maitland, esq., of Belmont, near Edinburgh. She died on 10 Dec. 1829, without surviving issue.

A fellow of the Society of Antiquaries, he printed in 1830, for private circulation, in one large folio volume, an ‘Historical and Genealogical Account of the Noble Family of Nevill, particularly the House of Abergavenny,’ with appendix and four genealogical tables. The plates are not so well executed as the letterpress. He also edited G. B. Blakeway's ‘Sheriffs of Shropshire,’ bringing the work down to 1830, and privately printing it in 1831.
