= Richard Rowland =

Richard Rowland may refer to:

- Richard A. Rowland (1880–1947), American studio executive and film producer
- Rich Rowland (born 1964), former baseball player
- Dick Rowland (1902–?), African-American shoe shiner

== See also ==
- Richard Rowlands (1550s–1640), Anglo-Dutch antiquary
