= John Rowlands =

John Rowlands may refer to:

- birth name of Henry Morton Stanley (1841–1904), Welsh-American journalist and explorer
- John Rowlands (footballer) (1947–2020), English professional footballer
- John Rowlands (author) (1938–2015), Welsh language novelist and academic
- John Rowlands (RAF officer) (1915–2006), George Cross recipient, World War II bomb disposal expert, post-war developer of British A-bomb
- John Rowlands (priest) (1925–2004), Anglican Dean of Gibraltar
- John Rowlands (Giraldus) (1824–1891), Welsh antiquary and educator
- John J. Rowlands (1892–1972), journalist, writer, and outdoorsman
- John Rowlands, programmer of Mayhem in Monsterland and other video games

== See also ==
- John Rowland (disambiguation)
