= Rowland House =

Rowland House may refer to:

- John A. Rowland House, Industry, California, listed on the NRHP in California
- Henry August Rowland House, Baltimore, Maryland, listed on the NRHP in Maryland
- Alfred Rowland House, Lumberton, North Carolina, listed on the NRHP in North Carolina
- Rowland House (Cheltenham, Pennsylvania), listed on the NRHP in Pennsylvania

== See also ==
- Rowland Site, Greenwood MS, listed on the NRHP in Mississippi
