= Henry Augustus Rowland (minister) =

American minister

Personal life
- Born: September 18, 1804 Windsor, Connecticut
- Died: September 4, 1859 (aged 54) Boston
- Education: Yale University; Andover Theological Seminary

Henry Augustus Rowland (September 18, 1804 – September 4, 1859) was an American minister.

He was the son of Rev. Henry A. Rowland of Windsor, Connecticut, and was born in that town September 18, 1804; his family was related to the preacher Jonathan Edwards.

He graduated from Yale University in 1823. After the completion of a course of theological studies at Andover Theological Seminary in 1827 he was ordained to the ministry, and spent a year at the South as an agent of the American Bible Society. In 1833, he was settled as Pastor of the Presbyterian Church at Fayetteville, North Carolina, from which place he removed after several years, to take charge of the Pearl Street Presbyterian Church, in New York City. From New York he was called to Honesdale, Pennsylvania, where he labored as Pastor ten years. About 1856, he left that place, and became the Pastor of the Park Presbyterian Church in Newark, New Jersey, which station he occupied at the time of his death. Six months previous to this event, his health gave way, and while travelling for its restoration he died at Boston. He was a frequent contributor to the religious periodicals, and was the author of several works, entitled The Common Maxims of Infidelity, The Path of Life, The Way of Peace, and Light in a Dark Alley.

He died in Boston, Massachusetts on September 4, 1859.

He was the father of physicist Henry Augustus Rowland.
