= Alice Rowland =

American politician (1894–1971)

- Rowland c. 1946

Member of the Connecticut Senate from the 24th district
- In office 1943–1951
- Preceded by: Arthur J. Hurley
- Succeeded by: Harold B. Iles

Member of the Connecticut House of Representatives from Ridgefield
- In office 1931–1935 Serving with Hugh Shields (1931–1933); Harvey B. Lown (1933–1935)
- Preceded by: Hugh Shields; Mortimer C. Keeler
- Succeeded by: Harvey B. Lown; Caro H. Northrop

Personal details
- Born: Alice V. McSherry; July 18, 1894 New York City, U.S.
- Died: February 11, 1971 (aged 76) Fort Lauderdale, Florida, U.S.
- Party: Republican
- Spouse: Joseph S. Rowland (m. 1913; died 1962)
- Children: 2

Alice V. Rowland (July 18, 1894 – February 11, 1971) was an American politician from Connecticut. A Republican, Rowland represented the town of Ridgefield in the Connecticut House of Representatives from 1931 to 1935. She represented the 24th district of the Connecticut State Senate from 1943 to 1951.

== Personal life ==
Alice V. McSherry was born in New York City on July 18, 1894, to Frank and Ellen McSherry. She graduated from Washington Irving High School. Both her parents died in 1907, and she became a schoolteacher at age 16. She married Joseph S. Rowland on September 24, 1913. They had two children. Joseph died in 1962.

== Political career ==
A Republican, Rowland was first elected to the Connecticut House of Representatives in 1930, and she served two terms representing the town of Ridgefield. She served her first term alongside Hugh Shields and the second alongside Harvey B. Lown. She did not run for reelection in 1934, instead running to represent the 24th district of the Connecticut State Senate. Her campaign was unsuccessful, and she left office in 1935.

In 1942, Rowland again ran to represent the 24th district. She was elected and served four terms. She did not run for reelection in 1950 and left office in 1951.

== Death ==
Rowland died on February 11, 1971, in Fort Lauderdale, Florida. She was 76.
