= Michael Rowland =

Michael or Mike Rowland may refer to:

== Arts and media ==
- Michael Rowland (journalist) (born 1968), Australian journalist
- Michael James Rowland (born 1964), Australian film director

== Sport ==
- Michael Rowland (jockey) (1963–2004), American jockey
- Mike Rowland (baseball) (born 1953), Major League Baseball pitcher

== Others ==
- Mike Rowland (wheelwright) (1937–2026), English wheelwright and coachbuilder in Devon
- Michael Rowland (prelate) (1929–2012), Roman Catholic bishop of Dundee, KwaZulu-Natal, South Africa

== See also ==
- Michael Rowlands (1944–2025), British anthropologist
