= Robin Rowland (judge) =

British judge (1922–2022)

Robin Rowland (1922–2022) was a British soldier, barrister, and judge. He attended Ballyclare High School, later enrolling at Queen's University Belfast, studying law.
