= Walter Hawkesworth =

Walter Hawkesworth (c. 1573 – 1606) was an English playwright and actor, and briefly was secretary of the ambassador to Spain.

== Life ==
Hawkesworth is thought to have been the son of John Hawkesworth, an attorney in the Exchequer of Pleas and a member of the Hawkesworth family of Hawkesworth, Yorkshire. He matriculated as a pensioner of Trinity College, Cambridge on 30 March 1588, was elected a scholar in 1589 (gaining BA in 1592, and MA 1595), was admitted a minor fellow in October 1593, and a major fellow in April 1595.

He became known as a writer and actor of comedies; he introduced to England the Italian commedia erudita as source material. His play Labyrinthus, in Latin, is based on La cintia by Giambattista della Porta. It was performed at Trinity College in March 1603, and is thought to have been performed before James I in the 1620s, during a visit by the King to Cambridge. Leander, also in Latin, is thought to have been written by Hawkesworth. It was performed at Trinity College in 1598, and in 1603 on the day after Labyrinthus. Hawkesworth played the principal roles in both of these plays. They were evidently popular, as several manuscript copies of the plays survive.

About Michaelmas 1605, Hawkesworth resigned his fellowship, and travelled to Spain as secretary of Sir Charles Cornwallis, who had been appointed ambassador in Madrid earlier in the year. He was soon sent back to England on a special mission by Cornwallis, who wrote to the earl of Salisbury that Hawkesworth left him "with a body weak, and a mind not very strong". In March 1606 he returned to Spain, with instructions from the council. He died of the plague at Cornwallis's house in Madrid in September 1606. He was unmarried, and had no children. In his will he named Edward Goldingham, who played the role of Hawkesworth's servant in Labyrinthus, as his sole heir and executor.
