= Toby Rowland =

American theatrical impresario

Toby Rowland (died 1994) was an American theatrical impresario who staged around 30 hit shows in London. His wife was Millie Rowland.
