= Castleconnor =

Civil parish in County Sligo, Ireland

Coordinates: 54.16°N 9.12°W

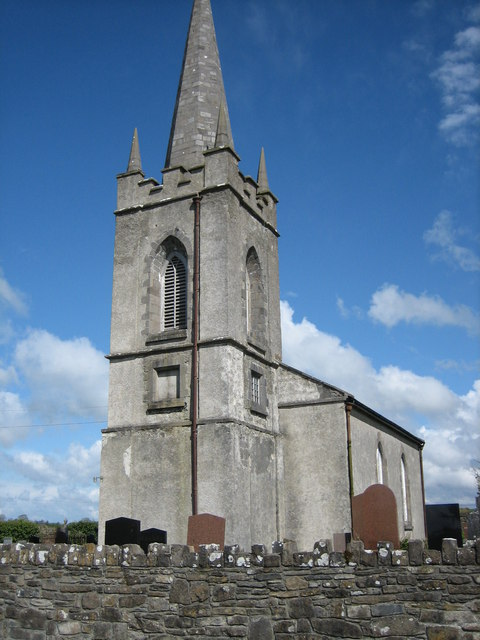
Killanley church (Church of Ireland)

Castleconnor (Irish: Caisleán Mhic Conchúir) is a civil parish in west County Sligo in Ireland. It lies in the historic barony of Tireragh.

The Church of Ireland church at Killanley in Castleconnor was built in 1818. The Roman Catholic church of Castleconnor parish has provided service to the community since at least the 1830s.

Many residents of Castleconnor parish emigrated to the United States in the 1840s.
