= Roland (name) =

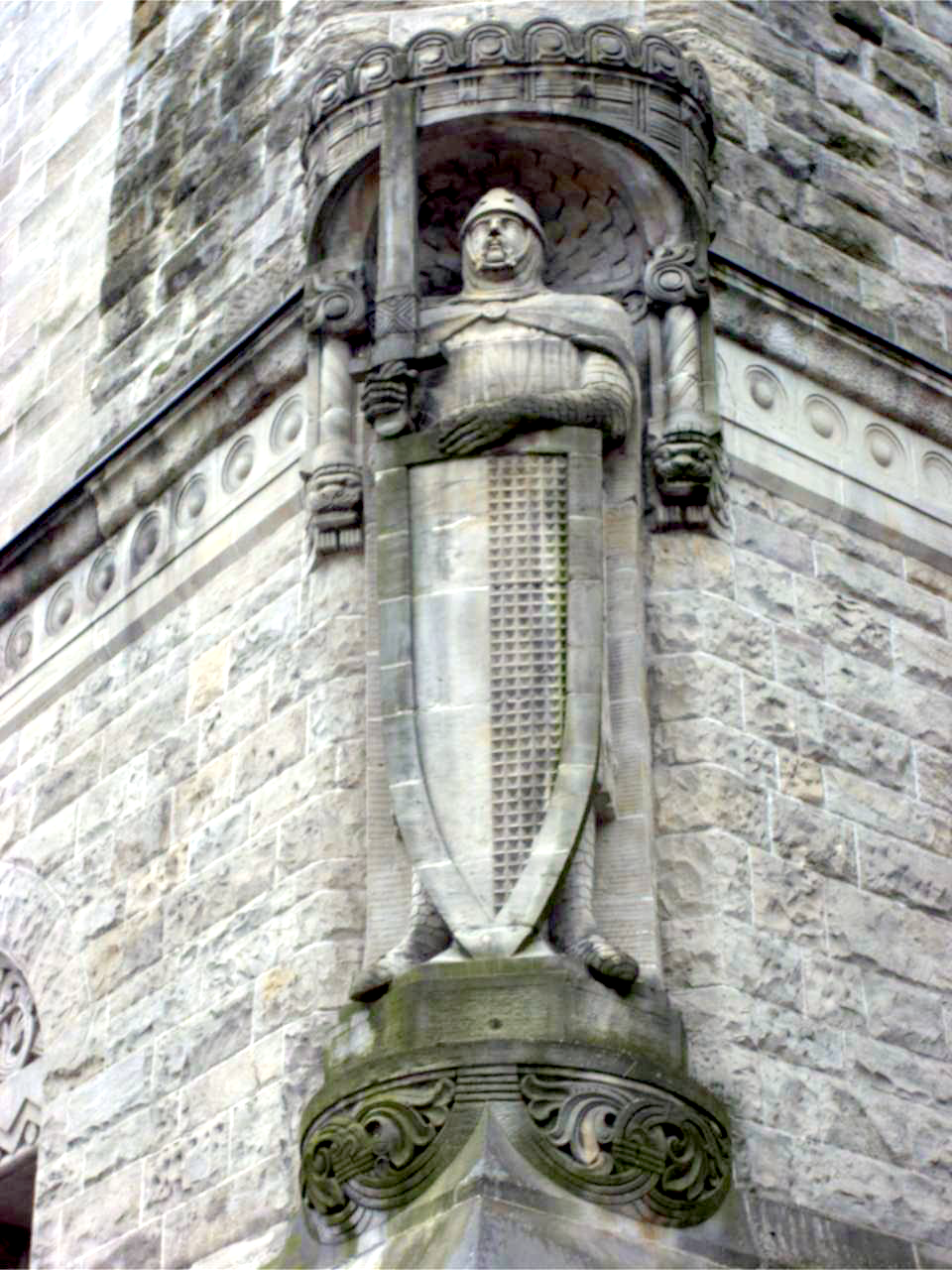
- Roland is a chivalrous old name made famous by the supposedly eight-foot-tall (2.4 m) romantic hero and nephew of Charlemagne, celebrated in medieval poetry and song.
- Pronunciation: /ˈroʊlənd/
- Gender: Male
- Language: Frankish
- Name day: 15 September

Origin
- Origin: hruod- + land
- Meaning: famed-land
- Region of origin: Rhineland

Other names
- Variant forms: Rolando, Orlando, Roldán
- Nicknames: Roly, Rollie
- Derived: Roldán, Lóránt, Roeland
- Related names: Rolands, Rolland, Rowland, Roeland, Loránd, Lóránt

Roland is a masculine Frankish given name that is also used as a family name. Forms in other languages include: Orlando (Italian), Rolando (Italian, Portuguese, Spanish), Roldán (Spanish), Lóránt and Loránd (Hungarian).

== Origin ==
The name Roland originates from Frankish. Its meaning has usually been identified as "famous land," "from the famous land," or "fame of the land", derived from the stems "Hrōð" or "χrōþi" meaning fame, and "land" (Hrōþiland). Some claim that "land" was derived from "nand," meaning "brave.",

The name became widespread after the semi-legendary military hero Roland who served in the Frankish army under Charlemagne circa 778 A.D. and whose exploits were celebrated in the Chanson de Roland or Song of Roland.

Variations include "Rollo" in British English and "Rolle" in Scandinavian languages.

== Given name ==
- Roland (bishop of Treviso) (fl. 1073–1089), Italian prelate
- Roland, Pope Alexander III
- Roland of Cremona (1178–1259), Italian Dominican friar and theologian
- Roland of Sicily (1296–1361), Sicilian nobleman and general

=== A–E ===
- Roland Bäckman (born 1960), Swedish politician
- Roland Bailey, American football player
- Roland Bardet, Swiss canoeist
- Roland Barthes (1915–1980), French literary critic and theorist
- Roland Bauer (1928–2017), German politician
- Roland Baumann (born 1992), Austrian politician
- Roland Beaulieu (born 1944), Canadian politician
- Roland Bervillé (born 1966), French businessman and racing driver
- Roland Bleyer (1946–2018), Australian businessman and entrepreneur
- Roland Bock (1944–2025), German Olympic wrestler
- Roland Bocquet (1878–1956), British composer, pianist and teacher
- Roland Siegfried Borchardt (1953–2021), German neo-Nazi
- Roland Borsa (died 1301), voivode of Transylvania
- Roland L. Bragg (1923–1999), American Army paratrooper during World War II
- Roland Brown, Tanzanian attorney general
- Roland Peter Brown (1926–2019), American physician
- Roland W. Brown (1893–1961), American paleobotanist and geologist
- Roland Rino Büchel (born 1965), Swiss businessman and politician
- Roland Burris (born 1937), American politician
- Roland Burrows (1882–1952), British judge and legal writer
- Roland Busch (born 1964), German business executive and physicist
- Roland Butcher, Barbados born English cricketer
- Roland C. Butler (1887–1961), American circus press agent and illustrator
- Roland Chaplain, English author and lecturer
- Roland A. Chicoine (1922–2016), American politician
- Roland Clark, multiple people
- Roland Collins (1918–2015), English painter
- Roland R. Conklin (1858–1938), American financier
- Roland Conway (1882–1960), Australian actor
- Roland Crump (1930–2023), American animator
- Roland Cziurlock (born 1967), German bodybuilder
- Roland Dancs (born 1985), Hungarian footballer
- Roland de Vries, South African military personnel
- Roland Desné (1931–2020), French writer
- Roland Dickey Jr., American businessman
- Roland Doré, multiple people
- Roland Dumas (1922–2024), French politician and lawyer
- Roland Duncan (1879–1958), Australian rules footballer
- Roland J. Ealey (1914–1992), American politician
- Roland Ekenberg (born 1957), Swedish Army major general
- Roland Emmerich (born 1955), German film director, screenwriter, and producer
- Roland Ertl (1934–2015), Austrian architect
- Roland Étienne (born 1944), French archaeologist

=== F–M ===
- Roland Faber-Castell (1905–1978), German nobleman and businessman
- Roland John Farrer (1873–1956), British colonial administrator
- Roland Faure (1926–2023), French journalist
- Roland Fomundam (born 1981), Cameroonian agricultural entrepreneur
- Roland Freisler (1893–1945), jurist and judge of Nazi Germany
- Roland of Galloway (d. 1200), Norse-Gaelic king of Galloway
- Roland Garros (aviator) (1888–1918), French aviator
- Roland Gerber, multiple people
- Roland Gibbs (1921–2004), British military officer
- Roland Gift (born 1961), British singer
- Roland Gigolayev (born 1990), Georgian-Russian footballer
- Roland Glaser (born 1935), German biophysicist
- Roland Göhler (1943–2025), German rower
- Roland Grapow (born 1959), German heavy metal guitarist
- Roland J. Green (1944–2021), American writer
- Roland Gutierrez, multiple people
- Roland Hampe (1908–1981), German archaeologist
- Roland Harrah III (1973–1995), American actor
- Roland Hattenberger (born 1948), Austrian footballer
- Sir Rowland Hill, (d. 1561) publisher of the Geneva Bible
- Roland N. Horne (born 1952), English engineer, author and academic
- Roland Howell (1892–1973), American baseball player
- Roland Huntford (1927–2026), British biographer
- Roland Idowu (born 2002), Irish footballer
- Roland Israelashvili, American poker player
- Roland James (born 1958), American footballer
- Roland James (footballer) (1897–1979), English footballer
- Roland Joffe (born 1945), British film director
- Roland Kaiser, multiple people
- Roland Kirk (a.k.a. Rahsaan Roland Kirk, 1935–1977), American jazz musician
- Roland Lee Knight (1917–1941), British flying ace
- Roland Koch (born 1958), German politician
- Roland Kun (born 1970), Nauruan politician
- Roland Kupers (born 1959), Dutch theoretical physicist, academic, and author
- Roland Le Clerc (born 1963), French cyclist
- Roland Lehoczky (born 2002), Hungarian footballer
- Roland Lynch (died 1625), Irish Anglican bishop
- Roland Lynch (footballer) (1893–1971), Australian rules footballer
- Roland Mall (1951–2025), German footballer
- Roland Mangles (1874–1948), English rugby union player
- Roland Maxwell (born 1902), English Anglican archdeacon
- Roland Mayer (classicist) (born 1947), Classical scholar
- Roland Mertelsmann (born 1944), German oncologist
- Roland Michener (1900–1991), Canadian politician, Governor General of Canada
- Roland S. Morris (1874–1945), American lawyer and diplomat
- Roland Affail Monney (born 1956), Ghanaian journalist and media professional
- Roland Mqwebu (1941–2015), South African actor

=== N–Z ===
- Roland Nenaj (born 1978), Albanian footballer
- Roland Orzabal (born 1961), English musician, songwriter and record producer
- Roland Paoletti (1931–2013), British-Italian architect
- Roland Paskoff (1933–2005), French geographer
- Roland Peelman, Belgian conductor
- Roland Penrose (1900–1984), British surrealist artist and poet
- Roland Pope (1864–1952), Australian cricketer and ophthalmologist
- Roland Posner (1942–2020), Czech-German semiotician and linguist
- Roland Quignon (1897–1984), French art director
- Roland Raforme (born 1966), Seychellois boxer
- Roland I Rátót (died 1277 or 1278), Hungarian influential lord
- Roland II Rátót (died 1301), Hungarian baron
- Roland III Rátót (died 1336), Hungarian baron
- Roland Ratzenberger (1960–1994), Austrian racing driver
- Roland Repiský (born 1990), Slovak footballer
- Roland Roche (born 1952), French alpine skier
- Roland Romanelli (born 1946), French musician
- Roland Rotherham, British historian and lecturer
- Roland Rudd (born 1961), English businessman
- Roland Rust (born 1952), American marketing scientist and consultant
- Roland Sallai (born 1997), Hungarian footballer
- Roland Salm (born 1950), Swiss cyclist
- Roland Salvador (born 1982), Filipino chess player
- Roland Schär (born 1950), Swiss cyclist
- Roland W. Scholz (born 1950), German mathematician, psychologist and professor
- Roland Schwarz, multiple people
- Roland Scott, multiple people
- Roland Siegwart (born 1959), Swiss robotics expert
- Roland Stănescu (1990–2022), Romanian footballer
- Roland Tan (c. 1948–2020), Singaporean-Danish gangster and fugitive wanted for murder
- Roland Tanner, Swiss bobsledder
- Roland Tay (born 1947), Singaporean funeral director
- Roland Stephen Tennekoon, Sri Lankan Sinhala politician, elected member of the State Council of Ceylon
- Roland the Farter, 12th century jester
- Roland J. Thornhill (born 1935), Canadian politician
- Roland Tong (born 1979), Irish dressage rider
- Roland Topor (1938–1997), French illustrator and writer
- Roland Evelyn Turnbull (1905–1960), British colonial administrator
- Roland Utbult (born 1951), Swedish politician and musician
- Roland Van Campenhout (born 1944), Flemish blues musician
- Roland Van Gerpen (1926–1983), American politician
- Roland Varga, multiple people
- Roland Varno (1908–1996), American actor
- Roland Venables Vernon (1877–1942), British civil servant
- Roland Vickers (1896–1947), English golfer
- Roland Wagner, multiple people
- Roland Watson, British journalist
- Roland Wiik (1915–1976), Finnish footballer
- Roland Wlodyka (1938–2020), American NASCAR driver
- Roland Wohlfarth (born 1963), German footballer
- Roland Wood (1933–2002), English Anglican bishop
- Roland Woolsey (born 1953), American football player
- Saint Roland (died 1200), French abbot

== Surname ==
- Blessed Nicolas Roland (1642–1678), Catholic priest
- C. Michael Roland (1952–2021), American polymer scientist
- Dean Roland (born 1972), American musician
- Dennis Roland (born 1983), American football player
- Ed Roland (born 1963), American musician
- Edwin J. Roland (1905–1985), American Coast Guard commandant
- Floyd Roland (born 1961), Canadian politician
- Gene Roland (1921–1981), American jazz composer and musician
- Gérard Roland, multiple people
- Gilbert Roland (1905–1994), American actor
- Ida Roland (1881–1951), Austrian actress
- Jannon Roland (born 1975), American basketball player
- Jean-Marie Roland (1734–1793), French politician, leader of the Girondist faction in the French Revolution
- Jeanne Roland (born 1937), Burmese-English model and actress
- Jeff Roland (1969–2024), French artist
- Joe Roland (1920–2009), American jazz musician
- John Roland (1941–2023), American journalist
- Johnny Roland (born 1943), American football player
- Isabella Roland (born 1994), American actress and comedian
- Madame Roland (1754–1793), wife of Jean-Marie
- Pauline Roland (1805–1852), French feminist
- Pierre Roland (born 1979), Indonesian actor
- Ruth Roland (1892–1937), American actress
- Seth Roland (born 1957), American soccer player and coach
- Walter Roland (1902–1972), American blues, boogie-woogie and jazz musician

== Fictional characters ==
- Roland Pryzbylewski, a character from The Wire
- Roland Deschain, a character from Stephen King’s The Dark Tower series
- Roland "Wee-Bey" Brice, a character from The Wire
- Roland, a character from Library Of Ruina

== Variations ==
- Rolando
- Rolly
- Rowland

== See also ==
- Roland (disambiguation)
- Orlando (given name)
- Rowland (given name)
- Rowland (surname)
- Robert
- Rodrick (disambiguation)
- Rudolph
- Roger
- Rowlandson
- Roland (game character)
- Roland Rat (British television puppet)
