= Rollo (name) =

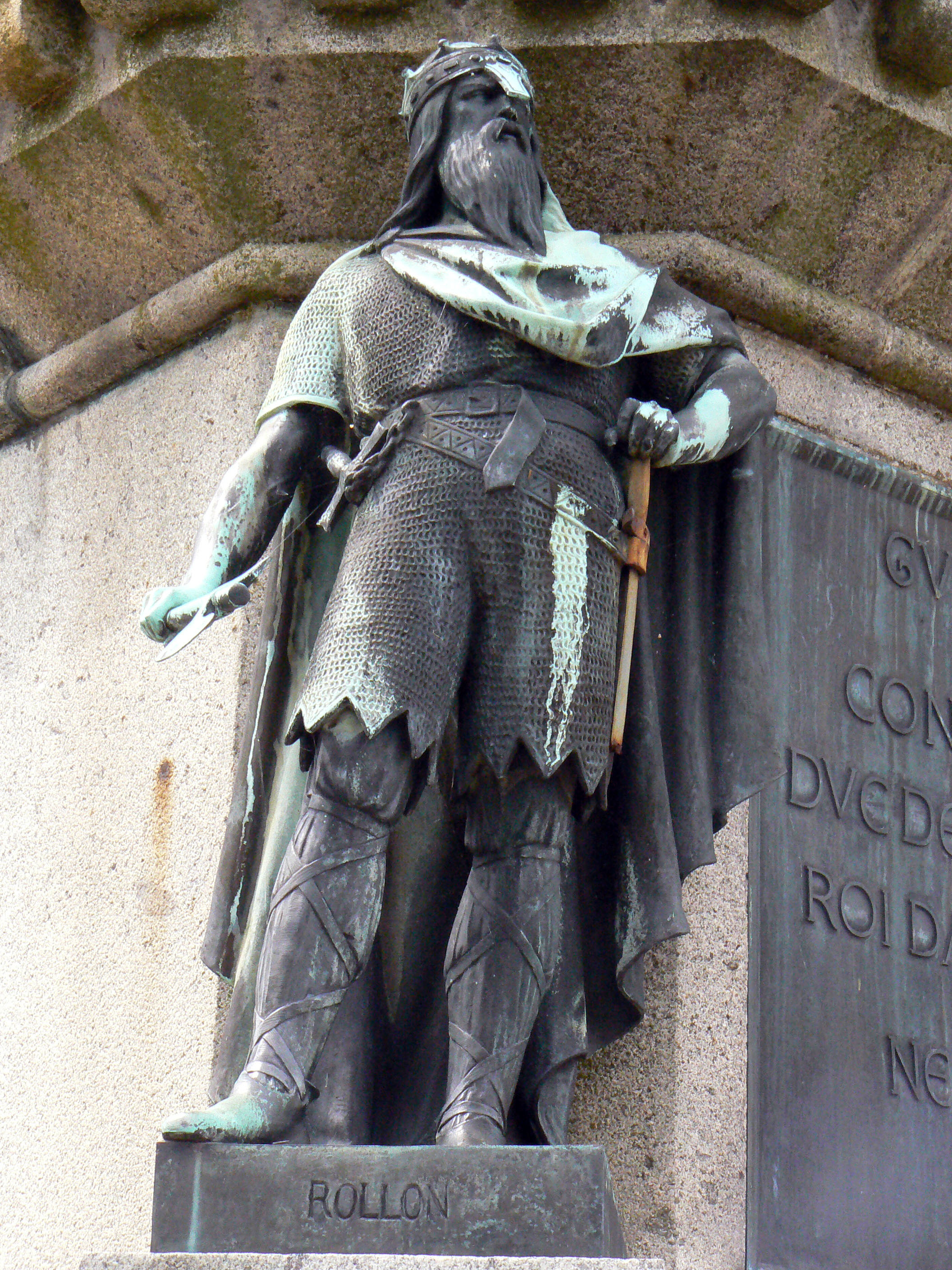
- Rollo of Normandy
- Language: Germanic; Old Norse; Scottish Gaelic

Origin
- Origin: Old Norse
- Derivation: Hrólfr
- Meaning: "fame-wolf"

Other names
- Related names: Rolf, Rudolph, Rollon, Roland

Rollo is a given name and surname derived from a Latinized form of the Old Norse Hrólfr or Rolfr (Rolf, Rudolf) meaning "famed wolf".

The name was first attested to with Viking warlord Rollo of Normandy, ancestor of William the Conqueror. In Scotland the Clan Rollo were supporters of Charles II and rewarded with the title of Lord Rollo.

Notable people with the name include:

== Given name ==
- Rollo of Normandy (fl. 10th century), Viking leader and first count of Normandy
- Rollo Armstrong (born 1966), English dancer and music producer
- Rollo Beck (1870–1950), American ornithologist
- Rollo Walter Brown (1880–1956), American writer and teacher of rhetoric
- Rollo Graham Campbell (1903–1978), Anglican Bishop of Colombo
- Rollo Carpenter (born 1965), British computer scientist
- Rollo Davidson (1944–1970), British mathematician
- Rollo Feilding, 11th Earl of Denbigh (1943–1995), British peer and racing driver
- Robert Rollo Gillespie (1766–1814), British Army major-general
- Rollo Hayman (1925–2008), Rhodesian politician
- Rollo Jack (1902–1994), English footballer
- Rollo Mainguy (1901–1979), Canadian vice-admiral
- Rollo May (1909–1994), American psychologist
- Rollo Pain (1921–2005), British Army lieutenant-general
- Rollo Weeks (born 1987), British actor

== Last name ==
- Andrew Rollo, 5th Lord Rollo (1703–1765), British army general in Canada and Dominica
- Alex Rollo (1926–2004), Scottish football player and manager
- Bill Rollo (born 1955), British Army officer
- David Rollo (footballer) (1891–1963), Northern Ireland Association Football player
- David Rollo (rugby union) (born 1934), Scottish rugby union footballer
- Deanna Rollo, American politician
- Hamish Rollo (1955–2009), British Army Officer
- Jim Rollo (1937–2012), Scottish footballer
- Jimmy Rollo (born 1976), English footballer
- John Rollo (dead 1809), Scottish military surgeon
- Marcus Di Rollo (born 1978), Scottish rugby union footballer
- Maria Fernanda Rollo (born 1965), Portuguese university history professor and former Secretary of State for Science, Technology and Higher Education
- Robert Rollo (footballer) (1887–1917), Scottish footballer
- Robert Rollo, 4th Lord Rollo (1679–1758), Scottish nobleman and Jacobite; father of Andrew Rollo
- William Rollo (academic) (1894–1960), South African linguist and classicist
- Sir William Rollo (died 1645), Scottish Royalist soldier

== Fictional characters ==
- Rollo, in books by Jacob Abbott
- King Rollo, a children's cartoon character
- Rollo Haveall, the rich little kid in Nancy comic books and the comic strip
- Rollo Lawson, on the American television show Sanford and Son
- Rollo Lee, the lead character in the film Fierce Creatures, played by John Cleese
- Rollo the Hippo, on the American children's television show Captain Kangaroo
- Rollo Tomasi, imaginary character from the 1997 film L.A. Confidential
- Rollo Rhubarb, the teacher's pet and foil to Hans and Fritz in The Katzenjammer Kids comic strip by Harold Knerr
- Rollo Lothbrok, a character in the TV series Vikings
- Rollo Fitzgerald, the antagonist in Ken Follett's 2017 novel A Column of Fire
- Rollo the Clown, from the 1991 film The Little Engine That Could
- Rollo the Clown, from the Adventures of Superman episode titled "The Clown Who Cried"

== See also ==
- Clan Rollo, a Scottish clan
