= Rollie =

Rollie is a nickname, often for Roland or Rolland, and occasionally a given name which may refer to:

== Rolands ==
- Rollie Boutin (born 1957), Canadian retired ice hockey goaltender
- Rollie Cook (born 1952), Canadian politician
- Rollie Dotsch (1933-1988), American professional football coach
- Rollie Fingers (born 1946), American retired Major League Baseball Hall-of-Fame pitcher
- Granville Roland Fortescue (1875-1952), American soldier, presidential aide (to cousin Theodore Roosevelt), journalist and war correspondent
- Rollie Free (1900-1984), American motorcycle racer who broke the American former land speed record in 1948
- Rollie Massimino (1934–2017), American college basketball coach and former player
- Roland McLenahan (1921-1984), Canadian National Hockey League player
- Roland Melanson (born 1960), Canadian retired ice hockey goaltender and coach, nicknamed "Rollie the goalie"
- Rollie Miles (1927-1995), Canadian Football League player
- Roland Paulhus (1901-1964), Canadian National Hockey League player
- Roland Pemberton (born 1986), Canadian rapper under the stage name Cadence Weapon
- Rollie Robinson (born 1985), Canadian curler
- Felix Rossignol (1920-1981), Canadian ice hockey player
- Rollie Sheldon (born 1936), American retired Major League Baseball pitcher
- Roland "Rollie" Page Dimick (born 1969), American, Pediatrician, artist, philosopher, designer, entrepreneur.

== Rollands ==
- Rolland Busch (1920-1985), Australian theologian and Presbyterian and Uniting Church minister
- Rollie Greeno (1926-2010), American college football coach
- Rolland W. Redlin (1920-2011), American politician
- Rollie Seltz (1924–2022), American retired basketball player who played in the National Basketball Association's first season
- Rollie Stiles (1906-2007), American Major League Baseball pitcher
- Rollie Williams (1897-1968), American National Football League player in 1923 and college basketball and football coach

== Presumed given name ==
- Rollie Cook (Canadian football) (born c. 1936), former Canadian Football League player
- Rollie Zeider (1883-1967), American Major League Baseball player

== Other ==
- Stratton Rollins Rollie Heath (born 1937), American politician, Democratic Majority Leader of the Colorado State Senate
- Ralston Rollie Hemsley (1907-1972), American Major League Baseball catcher
- Roleine Rollie Naylor (1892-1966), American Major League Baseball pitcher
- Rollin Prather (1925-1996), Canadian Football League player
- Rollie Lynn Riggs (1899-1954), American author, poet and playwright

== Fictional characters ==
- Roland Tyler, protagonist of the films F/X and F/X2, played by Bryan Brown

== See also ==
- Rolly (disambiguation)
