= Lóránt =

Lóránt is both a Hungarian masculine given name and a surname, a Hungarian equivalent of Roland. Other spellings include Lorànt and Lorant. The name day in Hungary is 15 January. Notable people with the name include:

== Given name ==
- Lorant de Bastyai (1910–1993), Hungarian-British falconer and sportswriter
- Lorànt Deutsch (born 1975), French actor and writer
- Lóránt Hajdú (born 1937), Hungarian classical pianist and composer
- Lóránt Hegedüs (1872–1943), Hungarian politician
- László Lóránt Keresztes (born 1975), Hungarian economist and politician
- Lóránt Kovács (born 1993), Romanian football player
- Lóránt Méhes Zuzu (born 1951), Hungarian visual artist and painter
- Lóránt Oláh (born 1979), Serbian-born Hungarian football player
- Lóránt Szabó (born 1966), Hungarian boxer
- Lóránt Vincze (born 1977), Romanian politician

== Surname ==
- Gabor Lorant (1930–2005), Hungarian-American architect
- Gyula Lóránt (1923–1981), Hungarian football player and manager
- José María Lorant (1955–2014), Argentine football player and coach
- Michael Lorant, American singer-songwriter and musician
- Péter Lóránt (born 1985), Hungarian basketball player
- Stefan Lorant (Hungarian: Lóránt István; 1901–1997), Hungarian-American filmmaker, photojournalist, and author
- Werner Lorant (1948–2025), German football player and manager

== See also ==
- Lorand, people named Lorand, Loránd or Lóránd
