= Rolland =

Rolland is a surname and masculine given name which may refer to:

== Surname ==
- Alain Rolland (born 1966), Irish rugby player and referee
- Andy Rolland (born 1942), Scottish footballer
- Antonin Rolland (born 1924), French cyclist
- Benjamin Rolland (1773–1855), French painter and museum director
- Colette Rolland (born 1943), French computer scientist
- Douglas Rolland (1861–1914), Scottish golfer
- Elohim Rolland (born 1989), French footballer
- George Rolland (1869–1910), British recipient of the Victoria Cross
- Georges Rolland (1852–1910), French geologist, explorer and industrialist
- Gustave Rolland (1809–1871), French engineer and politician
- James Rolland (1802–1889), New Zealand politician
- Jean-Baptiste Rolland (1815–1888), Canadian printer, bookseller, businessman and politician
- Jean-Christophe Rolland (born 1968), French rower
- Kayla Rolland (1993–2000), child shot and killed by another child
- Kevin Rolland (born 1989), French freestyle skier
- Léon Louis Rolland (1841–1912), French mycologist
- Madeleine Rolland (1872–1960), French translator and peace activist
- Matthias Rolland (born 1979), French rugby player
- Marion Rolland (born 1982), French alpine skier
- Michel Rolland (1947–2026), French oenologist
- Monique Rolland (1913–1999), French actress
- Pierre Rolland (disambiguation), several people
- Romain Rolland (1866–1944), French writer, novelist, essayist, art historian and mystic
- Roy Rolland (1921–1997), comedian and actor who played Old Mother Riley
- Stéphane Rolland, French fashion designer
- Vincent Rolland (born 1970), French politician

== Given name ==
- Rolland Busch (1920–1985), Australian theologian and minister
- Rolland Courbis (1953–2026), French football player and manager
- Rolland Fisher (1900–1982), American minister and evangelist
- Rollie Greeno (1926–2010), American college football coach
- D. Rolland Jennings (born 1951), American politician
- Rolland Lawrence (born 1951), American football player
- Rolland McMaster, American trade unionist
- Rolland O'Regan (1904–1992), New Zealand surgeon, activist and politician
- Rolland W. Redlin (1920–2011), American politician
- Rollie Seltz (1924–2022), American basketball player
- Rolland H. Spaulding (1873–1942), American manufacturer and politician from New Hampshire
- Rollie Stiles (1906–2007), American baseball player
- Rolland Todd, American basketball player first coach
- Rollie Williams (1897–1968), American football player and coach

== See also ==
- Roland (disambiguation)
- Rowland (disambiguation)
- Rollie, a list of people with the nickname
