= 1968 United States presidential election in Indiana =

- November 5, 1968
- Turnout: 69.5% ▼2.2 pp

Nominee	Richard Nixon	Hubert Humphrey	George Wallace
Party	Republican	Democratic	American Independent
Home state	New York (Note: Although he was born in California and he served as a U.S. senator from California, in 1968 Richard Nixon’s official state of residence was New York, because he moved there to practice law after his defeat in the 1962 California gubernatorial election. During his first term as president, Nixon re-established his residency in California. Consequently, most reliable reference books list Nixon's home state as New York in the 1968 election and his home state as California in the 1972 (and 1960) election.)	Minnesota	Alabama
Running mate	Spiro Agnew	Edmund Muskie	Curtis LeMay
Electoral vote	13	0	0
Popular vote	1,067,885	806,659	243,108
Percentage	50.29%	37.99%	11.45%
County results
Nixon
40–50%
50–60%
60–70%
Humphrey
40–50%
President before election
Lyndon B. Johnson
Democratic
Elected President
Richard Nixon
Republican

A presidential election was held in Indiana on November 5, 1968. The Republican ticket of the former vice president of the United States Richard Nixon and the governor of Maryland Spiro Agnew defeated the Democratic ticket of the incumbent vice president Hubert Humphrey and the junior U.S. senator from Maine Edmund Muskie. The American Independent ticket of the former governor of Alabama George Wallace and the chief of staff of the United States Air Force Curtis LeMay finished third. Nixon defeated Humphrey in the national election with 301 electoral votes.

Nixon ran unopposed in the May Republican primary, garnering just over half a million votes. The junior U.S. senator from New York Robert F. Kennedy won the Democratic primary with the overwhelming support of the state's Black voters. Kennedy's assassination a month later preceded the 1968 Democratic National Convention, which nominated Humphrey amidst protests against the United States' involvement in the Vietnam War.

Republicans were expected to flip Indiana four years after the Democratic landslide victory in 1964. Some polls showed Wallace running even with Humphrey in late October; however, by Election Day his share of the vote had fallen drastically, finishing at 11 percent. Wallace performed best in counties with large concentrations of Black voters, where white support for Wallace counterbalanced Black support for the Democratic ticket.

Nixon's victory was the first of ten consecutive Republican victories in the state, as Indiana would not vote for a Democratic candidate again until Barack Obama in 2008.

== Background ==
Although it was considered a reliably Republican state, Indiana defected from the Republican column in 1964 to support the Democratic incumbent president Lyndon Johnson, who became the first Democratic presidential candidate to carry Indiana since Franklin D. Roosevelt in 1936. The defeated Republican candidate, Barry Goldwater, faced powerful hostility from Northern and Southern Indiana that doomed his campaign in the state.

Wallace contested the 1964 Democratic Party presidential primaries and won significant support in Indiana counties that would soon become part of the Rust Belt. He nevertheless lost the Indiana primary by a greater than two-to-one margin to the governor of Indiana Matthew E. Welsh, who ran as a stalking horse for Johnson. Regression analysis conducted after the election revealed significant blue-collar support for Wallace, in contrast to Wisconsin, where middle class conservatism underlay Wallace's strong performance in the Democratic primary.

Republicans recovered some ground in the 1966 United States House of Representatives elections in Indiana. The party made significant gains in Southern Indiana and in the significantly German-American Central region, but did less well in Northern Indiana.

== Primary elections ==
=== Republican Party ===
Indiana Republican primary, May 7, 1968
Party	Candidate	Votes	%
Republican	Richard Nixon	508,362	100.00
Total votes		508,362	100.00

=== Democratic Party ===
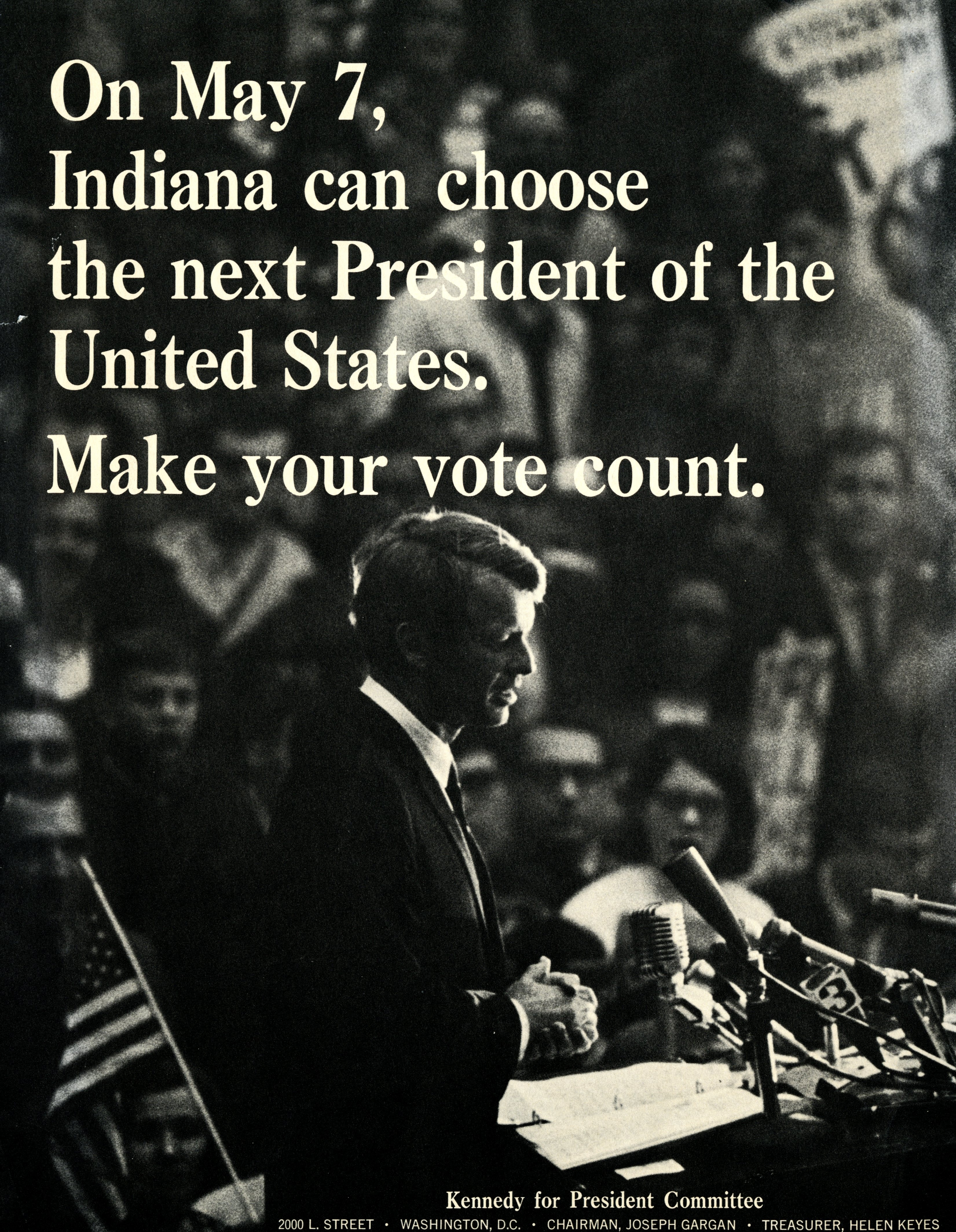
Campaign advertisement promoting the candidacy of Robert F. Kennedy in the Indiana primary.

Kennedy defeated the governor of Indiana Roger D. Branigin and the senior U.S. senator from Minnesota Eugene McCarthy in the Indiana Democratic primary. The senator had selected the Indiana primary as the first event of his candidacy after entering the race in March and hoped that a strong showing in the state would catapult him to the nomination, much as his brother John F. Kennedy's victory in the 1960 West Virginia Democratic primary had done eight years earlier.

Kennedy made his first appearance in Indianapolis on April 4, 1968, hours after the assassination of Martin Luther King, Jr. in Memphis, Tennessee. Kennedy's speech to the crowd of mourners is sometimes credited for the peaceful response to King's assassination in Indianapolis, in contrast to riots in other major cities.

Branigin had initially agreed to run as a stalking horse for Johnson prior to the latter's withdrawal from the race in March. Some Kennedy backers believed their candidate could not prevail against the popular and erudite governor, and instead hoped for a strong second-place finish. Branigin's perceived apathy to the economic demands of the civil rights movement alienated Black organizations like the Radical Action Program, whose president, Charles Hendricks, was a fervent Kennedy supporter.

Kennedy's position as an anti-war candidate placed him in competition with McCarthy, who was known for his opposition to United States involvement in the Vietnam War. Kennedy enjoyed the support of most of the Black community, while McCarthy was enormously popular with the student movement.

Kennedy ultimately did carry the state by a 12-point margin over Branigin, while McCarthy finished third with 27 percent of the vote. Kennedy was the overwhelming choice of Black voters, winning 90 percent of the vote in the Black-majority precincts of Gary, Indiana. In some Black-majority precincts in Indianapolis, Branigin and McCarthy together received only a few dozen votes. Kennedy carried nine of Indiana's 11 congressional districts, earning 56 of the state's 63 delegates to the 1968 Democratic National Convention. Branigin carried two districts and seven delegates, while McCarthy received no delegates.

Indiana Democratic primary, May 7, 1968
Party	Candidate	Votes	%
Democratic	Robert F. Kennedy	328,118	42.26
Democratic	Roger D. Branigin	238,700	30.74
Democratic	Eugene McCarthy	209,695	27.00
Total votes		776,513	100.00

== General election ==
=== Results ===
1968 United States presidential election in Indiana
Party	Candidate	Votes	%	±%
Republican	Richard Nixon Spiro Agnew	1,067,885	50.29	▲6.73
Democratic	Hubert Humphrey Edmund Muskie	806,659	37.99	▼17.99
American Independent	George Wallace Curtis LeMay	243,108	11.45	▲11.45
Prohibition	E. Harold Munn Rolland Fisher	4,616	0.22	▼0.18
Socialist Workers	Fred Halstead Paul Boutelle	1,293	0.06	▲0.06
Freedom and Peace	Dick Gregory (write-in) Mark Lane (write-in)	36	0.00	Steady
Total votes		2,123,597	100.00	

=== Results by county ===
1968 United States presidential election in Indiana by county
County	Richard Nixon Republican		Hubert Humphrey Democratic		George Wallace American Independent		Others		Margin		Total
County	Votes	%	Votes	%	Votes	%	Votes	%	Votes	%	Total
Adams	5,774	51.28%	4,667	41.45%	762	6.77%	56	0.50%	1,107	9.83%	11,259
Allen	59,211	54.34%	40,411	37.09%	9,121	8.37%	211	0.19%	18,800	17.25%	108,954
Bartholomew	13,628	55.80%	8,268	33.85%	2,438	9.98%	90	0.37%	5,360	21.95%	24,424
Benton	3,326	59.54%	1,854	33.19%	400	7.16%	6	0.11%	1,472	26.35%	5,586
Blackford	3,052	46.92%	2,898	44.56%	534	8.21%	20	0.31%	154	2.36%	6,504
Boone	7,905	58.96%	4,118	30.72%	1,346	10.04%	38	0.28%	3,787	28.24%	13,407
Brown	1,881	49.41%	1,327	34.86%	587	15.42%	12	0.32%	554	14.55%	3,807
Carroll	4,796	56.19%	2,816	32.99%	918	10.76%	5	0.06%	1,980	23.20%	8,535
Cass	9,441	51.54%	7,142	38.99%	1,678	9.16%	57	0.31%	2,299	12.55%	18,318
Clark	10,305	38.33%	11,493	42.75%	4,982	18.53%	106	0.39%	-1,188	-4.42%	26,886
Clay	5,743	50.83%	3,956	35.02%	1,569	13.89%	30	0.27%	1,787	15.81%	11,298
Clinton	7,929	53.91%	5,714	38.85%	1,033	7.02%	31	0.21%	2,215	15.06%	14,707
Crawford	2,132	49.81%	1,536	35.89%	589	13.76%	23	0.54%	596	13.92%	4,280
Daviess	7,036	56.77%	4,071	32.85%	1,274	10.28%	12	0.10%	2,965	23.92%	12,393
Dearborn	6,208	48.65%	4,842	37.95%	1,704	13.35%	6	0.05%	1,366	10.70%	12,760
Decatur	5,474	55.67%	3,602	36.63%	731	7.43%	26	0.26%	1,872	19.04%	9,833
DeKalb	7,650	56.93%	4,790	35.65%	931	6.93%	67	0.50%	2,860	21.28%	13,438
Delaware	23,554	47.56%	19,532	39.44%	6,349	12.82%	88	0.18%	4,022	8.12%	49,523
Dubois	5,865	43.24%	6,725	49.58%	958	7.06%	15	0.11%	-860	-6.34%	13,563
Elkhart	24,484	57.90%	14,222	33.63%	3,440	8.13%	143	0.34%	10,262	24.27%	42,289
Fayette	5,286	46.92%	4,549	40.38%	1,413	12.54%	18	0.16%	737	6.54%	11,266
Floyd	9,714	40.99%	10,671	45.02%	3,266	13.78%	50	0.21%	-957	-4.03%	23,701
Fountain	5,110	53.02%	3,237	33.59%	1,280	13.28%	10	0.10%	1,873	19.43%	9,637
Franklin	3,468	52.28%	2,386	35.97%	775	11.68%	5	0.08%	1,082	16.31%	6,634
Fulton	5,145	60.72%	2,561	30.22%	757	8.93%	11	0.13%	2,584	30.50%	8,474
Gibson	7,645	47.91%	6,777	42.47%	1,497	9.38%	38	0.24%	868	5.44%	15,957
Grant	16,170	52.46%	10,938	35.48%	3,602	11.68%	116	0.38%	5,232	16.98%	30,826
Greene	6,525	48.37%	5,493	40.72%	1,419	10.52%	54	0.40%	1,032	7.65%	13,491
Hamilton	14,250	67.63%	4,586	21.77%	2,202	10.45%	31	0.15%	9,664	45.86%	21,069
Hancock	7,516	56.23%	3,902	29.19%	1,896	14.19%	52	0.39%	3,614	27.04%	13,366
Harrison	4,410	45.32%	3,725	38.28%	1,557	16.00%	39	0.40%	685	7.04%	9,731
Hendricks	12,597	59.89%	5,155	24.51%	3,231	15.36%	49	0.23%	7,442	35.38%	21,032
Henry	11,626	52.61%	8,045	36.41%	2,366	10.71%	60	0.27%	3,581	16.20%	22,097
Howard	15,905	50.39%	11,026	34.93%	4,507	14.28%	128	0.41%	4,879	15.46%	31,566
Huntington	9,002	54.48%	6,238	37.75%	1,250	7.57%	33	0.20%	2,764	16.73%	16,523
Jackson	7,710	52.02%	5,140	34.68%	1,891	12.76%	80	0.54%	2,570	17.34%	14,821
Jasper	4,996	60.54%	2,201	26.67%	1,003	12.15%	52	0.63%	2,795	33.87%	8,252
Jay	5,460	51.00%	4,290	40.07%	918	8.58%	37	0.35%	1,170	10.93%	10,705
Jefferson	5,731	49.31%	4,635	39.88%	1,196	10.29%	61	0.52%	1,096	9.43%	11,623
Jennings	4,416	51.11%	2,996	34.68%	1,214	14.05%	14	0.16%	1,420	16.43%	8,640
Johnson	12,089	57.26%	5,946	28.17%	3,021	14.31%	55	0.26%	6,143	29.09%	21,111
Knox	8,369	46.97%	7,297	40.95%	2,053	11.52%	99	0.56%	1,072	6.02%	17,818
Kosciusko	12,633	63.98%	5,342	27.06%	1,700	8.61%	69	0.35%	7,291	36.92%	19,744
LaGrange	3,328	61.54%	1,691	31.27%	380	7.03%	9	0.17%	1,637	30.27%	5,408
Lake	77,911	36.48%	99,897	46.77%	35,099	16.43%	667	0.31%	-21,986	-10.29%	213,574
LaPorte	20,295	49.76%	15,780	38.69%	4,587	11.25%	121	0.30%	4,515	11.07%	40,783
Lawrence	8,830	54.35%	5,349	32.92%	1,995	12.28%	74	0.46%	3,481	21.43%	16,248
Madison	28,726	48.39%	23,886	40.23%	6,613	11.14%	143	0.24%	4,840	8.16%	59,368
Marion	162,503	52.26%	115,715	37.22%	32,043	10.31%	661	0.21%	46,788	15.04%	310,922
Marshall	9,290	56.67%	5,385	32.85%	1,685	10.28%	34	0.21%	3,905	23.82%	16,394
Martin	2,512	46.22%	2,315	42.59%	604	11.11%	4	0.07%	197	3.63%	5,435
Miami	7,295	53.42%	5,019	36.76%	1,294	9.48%	47	0.34%	2,276	16.66%	13,655
Monroe	13,752	50.78%	10,789	39.84%	2,361	8.72%	178	0.66%	2,963	10.94%	27,080
Montgomery	9,085	59.87%	4,752	31.31%	1,309	8.63%	29	0.19%	4,333	28.56%	15,175
Morgan	8,944	55.45%	4,042	25.06%	3,122	19.36%	22	0.14%	4,902	30.39%	16,130
Newton	3,145	61.75%	1,453	28.53%	483	9.48%	12	0.24%	1,692	33.22%	5,093
Noble	6,699	51.35%	5,075	38.90%	1,253	9.60%	19	0.15%	1,624	12.45%	13,046
Ohio	1,053	46.04%	991	43.33%	243	10.63%	0	0.00%	62	2.71%	2,287
Orange	4,666	54.82%	2,918	34.28%	915	10.75%	13	0.15%	1,748	20.54%	8,512
Owen	2,898	51.58%	1,932	34.39%	776	13.81%	12	0.21%	966	17.19%	5,618
Parke	3,738	52.47%	2,472	34.70%	907	12.73%	7	0.10%	1,266	17.77%	7,124
Perry	4,211	46.23%	4,343	47.68%	547	6.01%	7	0.08%	-132	-1.45%	9,108
Pike	3,087	45.38%	2,953	43.41%	745	10.95%	17	0.25%	134	1.97%	6,802
Porter	17,328	53.18%	8,914	27.36%	6,126	18.80%	214	0.66%	8,414	25.82%	32,582
Posey	5,045	49.70%	3,889	38.32%	1,204	11.86%	12	0.12%	1,156	11.38%	10,150
Pulaski	3,361	54.80%	2,071	33.77%	681	11.10%	20	0.33%	1,290	21.03%	6,133
Putnam	5,873	51.47%	3,692	32.36%	1,826	16.00%	19	0.17%	2,181	19.11%	11,410
Randolph	7,238	57.14%	3,962	31.28%	1,431	11.30%	36	0.28%	3,276	25.86%	12,667
Ripley	5,389	51.82%	3,787	36.42%	1,215	11.68%	8	0.08%	1,602	15.40%	10,399
Rush	5,004	59.42%	2,636	31.30%	761	9.04%	20	0.24%	2,368	28.12%	8,421
St. Joseph	47,114	44.09%	47,414	44.37%	11,948	11.18%	388	0.36%	-300	-0.28%	106,864
Scott	2,671	42.62%	2,796	44.61%	784	12.51%	16	0.26%	-125	-1.99%	6,267
Shelby	8,574	52.84%	5,417	33.38%	2,205	13.59%	30	0.18%	3,157	19.46%	16,226
Spencer	4,603	51.18%	3,767	41.89%	612	6.81%	11	0.12%	836	9.29%	8,993
Starke	4,011	47.95%	3,208	38.35%	1,097	13.11%	49	0.59%	803	9.60%	8,365
Steuben	4,762	62.51%	2,268	29.77%	577	7.57%	11	0.14%	2,494	32.74%	7,618
Sullivan	4,266	43.20%	4,453	45.10%	1,135	11.49%	20	0.20%	-187	-1.90%	9,874
Switzerland	1,515	44.07%	1,466	42.64%	452	13.15%	5	0.15%	49	1.43%	3,438
Tippecanoe	24,352	59.44%	14,528	35.46%	2,000	4.88%	88	0.21%	9,824	23.98%	40,968
Tipton	4,270	54.73%	2,646	33.91%	861	11.04%	25	0.32%	1,624	20.82%	7,802
Union	1,691	56.01%	920	30.47%	404	13.38%	4	0.13%	771	25.54%	3,019
Vanderburgh	38,231	49.28%	31,326	40.38%	7,737	9.97%	283	0.36%	6,905	8.90%	77,577
Vermillion	3,607	41.76%	3,845	44.52%	1,175	13.60%	10	0.12%	-238	-2.76%	8,637
Vigo	20,814	44.60%	20,328	43.56%	5,386	11.54%	136	0.29%	486	1.04%	46,664
Wabash	8,611	61.07%	4,598	32.61%	836	5.93%	56	0.40%	4,013	28.46%	14,101
Warren	2,475	57.00%	1,375	31.67%	483	11.12%	9	0.21%	1,100	25.33%	4,342
Warrick	5,742	47.53%	4,784	39.60%	1,503	12.44%	52	0.43%	958	7.93%	12,081
Washington	3,891	48.61%	2,936	36.68%	1,143	14.28%	34	0.42%	955	11.93%	8,004
Wayne	17,335	53.66%	10,686	33.08%	4,240	13.12%	47	0.15%	6,649	20.58%	32,308
Wells	5,361	53.07%	3,827	37.89%	882	8.73%	31	0.31%	1,534	15.18%	10,101
White	5,932	57.56%	3,395	32.95%	965	9.36%	13	0.13%	2,537	24.61%	10,305
Whitley	5,684	53.27%	3,848	36.06%	1,120	10.50%	19	0.18%	1,836	17.21%	10,671
TOTAL	1,067,885	50.29%	806,659	37.99%	243,108	11.45%	5,945	0.28%	261,226	12.30%	2,123,597

==== Counties that flipped from Democratic to Republican ====
- Delaware
- Madison
- Spencer
- Starke
- Tippecanoe
- Vanderburgh
- Vigo
- Crawford
- Gibson
- Jefferson
- Knox
- Pike
- Posey
- Switzerland
- Adams
- Allen
- Bartholomew
- Benton
- Brown
- Blackford
- Carroll
- Cass
- Clay
- Clinton
- Daviess
- Decatur
- Dearborn
- DeKalb
- Elkhart
- Fayette
- Fountain
- Franklin
- Grant
- Greene
- Hancock
- Harrison
- Henry
- Howard
- Huntington
- Jackson
- Jay
- Jennings
- LaGrange
- LaPorte
- Lawrence
- Marshall
- Martin
- Marion
- Miami
- Montgomery
- Monroe
- Noble
- Ohio
- Orange
- Owen
- Parke
- Pulaski
- Putnam
- Randolph
- Ripley
- Shelby
- Tipton
- Wabash
- Warren
- Warrick
- Washington
- Wells
- White
- Whitley

== See also ==
- United States presidential elections in Indiana

== Bibliography ==
- Boomhower, Ray E. (2008). Robert F. Kennedy and the 1968 Indiana Primary. Bloomington: Indiana University Press.
- Conway, M. Margaret (December 1968). "The White Backlash Re-examined: Wallace and the 1964 Primaries". Social Science Quarterly. 49 (3): 710–19. JSTOR 42858429.
- Congressional Quarterly (1985). Congressional Quarterly's Guide to U.S. Elections (2nd ed.). Washington D.C.: Congressional Quarterly.
- Madison, James H. (1986). The Indiana Way: A State History. Bloomington: Indiana University Press.
- McGillivray, Alice V.; Scammon, Richard M. (1994). America at the Polls, 1960–1992: Kennedy to Clinton; A Handbook of American Presidential Election Statistics. Washington, D.C.: Congressional Quarterly.
- Phillips, Kevin P. (1969). The Emerging Republican Majority. New Rochelle, NY: Arlington House. LCCN 76-79602.
- Salin, William N. (1968). General Election Report of the Secretary of State of the State of Indiana: 1968 General Election Statistics. Indianapolis: Indiana Secretary of State.
- Schaffer, William R.; Caputo, David A. (November 1972). "Political Continuity in Indiana Presidential Elections: An Analysis Based on the Key-Munger Paradigm". Midwest Journal of Political Science. 16 (4): 700–11. JSTOR 2110383.
