= Rolando (given name) =

- Gender: male

Origin
- Meaning: Famous throughout the land
- Region of origin: Spain, Italy, Portugal

Other names
- Related names: Roland, Orlando, Roldán

Rolando is a Spanish, Italian and Portuguese variant of Roland, the Frankish military hero who served under Charlemagne and whose life became the basis for the medieval French epic Chanson de Roland and various other works of European literature. The name appears most frequently as a Spanish given name. Its presence is said to be from Spain, however it has also been used in Italy, sometimes as a surname. Related names include Roland, Orlando and Roldán.

== List of people with the given name Rolando ==
- Rolando (footballer) (born 1985), Rolando Jorge Pires da Fonseca
- Rolando Aarons (born 1995), English footballer
- Rolando Alarcón (1929-1973), Chilean folk musician
- Rolando Bianchi (born 1983), Italian footballer
- Rolando Blackman (born 1959) American basketball player
- Rolando Cruz (born 1939), Puerto Rican pole vaulter
- Rolando Cubela Secades, Cuban revolutionary
- Rolando Fonseca (born 1974), Costa Rican footballer
- Rolando Frazer (born 1958), Panamanian basketball player
- Rolando Garibotti, Argentinian-American climber
- Rolando Jurquin (born 1987), volleyball player
- Rolando Pinedo Larrea (born 1994), Afro-Bolivian crown prince
- Rolando Masferrer, Cuban politician and counter-revolutionary
- Rolando McClain (born 1989), American football player
- Rolando Mendoza, Nicaraguan athlete
- Rolando Perez, American mixed martial artist
- Rolando Zárate (born 1978), Argentine football player
- Edson Rolando Silva Sousa (born 1983), Portuguese footballer
- Rolando Gonzalez-Bunster (born c. 1949), US-based Argentine businessman

== See also ==
- Roland (disambiguation)
- Rolanda
- Ronaldo (name)
