= Rolly =

Rolly is a masculine given name and nickname (often for Roland or Rolland) which may refer to:

== People ==
- Rolly Bester (1917-1984), radio personality (noted as first voice of Lois Lane) and wife of science fiction author Alfred Bester
- Rolly Crump (1930-2023), American animator and designer
- Rolly Jayewardene (1918–1999), Sri Lankan physician
- Rolly Lumbala (born 1986), Canadian Football League player
- Rolly Roulston (1911–1983), Canadian National Hockey League player
- Rolly Tasker (1926–2012), Australian Olympic sailor
- Rolly Teranishi (born 1963), Japanese musician, actor and music producer
- Rolly Xipu (born 1952), South African boxer

== Fictional characters ==
- Rolly Forbes, on the TV series Amen
- Rolly, a character on the animated children's TV series Puppy Dog Pals
- Rolly, a character in the Disney movie One Hundred and One Dalmatians
- Romy Rolly, a character played by Rishi Kapoor in the 2009 Indian film Luck By Chance

== Other uses ==
- Rolly Pistoia, Italian professional basketball team
- Raymonde Rolly (1917–1988), New Caledonian resistance member
- Sony Rolly, a digital audioplayer
- Typhoon Rolly, a typhoon name used in the Philippines by PAGASA

== See also ==
- Rollie, a nickname
