= Roldán =

Roldán may refer to:

- Los Roldán, Argentine telenovela
- Roldán (name), Spanish surname
- Roldán, Santa Fe, city in Argentina
