= Robert Rollo =

Robert Rollo may refer to:

- Robert Rollo (footballer) (1887–1917), Scottish footballer
- Robert Rollo, 4th Lord Rollo (1679–1758), Scottish nobleman and Jacobite

== See also ==
- Sir Robert Rollo Gillespie (1766–1814), officer in the British Army
