= 1968 United States presidential election in Kansas =

- November 5, 1968

Nominee	Richard Nixon	Hubert Humphrey	George Wallace
Party	Republican	Democratic	Conservative
Alliance			American Independent
Home state	New York (Note: Although he was born in California and he served as a U.S. senator from California, in 1968 Richard Nixon’s official state of residence was New York, because he moved there to practice law after his defeat in the 1962 California gubernatorial election. During his first term as president, Nixon re-established his residency in California. Consequently, most reliable reference books list Nixon's home state as New York in the 1968 election and his home state as California in the 1972 (and 1960) election.)	Minnesota	Alabama
Running mate	Spiro Agnew	Edmund Muskie	S. Marvin Griffin
Electoral vote	7	0	0
Popular vote	478,674	302,996	88,921
Percentage	54.84%	34.72%	10.19%
County results
Nixon
40–50%
50–60%
60–70%
70–80%
Humphrey
40–50%
President before election
Lyndon B. Johnson
Democratic
Elected President
Richard Nixon
Republican

The 1968 United States presidential election in Kansas was held on November 5, 1968 as part of the 1968 United States presidential election. Richard Nixon won Kansas against both Hubert Humphrey and George Wallace. Nixon carried every county except traditionally Democratic Wyandotte.

== Results ==
Electoral results
Presidential candidate	Party	Home state	Popular vote		Electoral vote	Running mate		
Presidential candidate	Party	Home state	Count	Percentage	Electoral vote	Vice-presidential candidate	Home state	Electoral vote
Richard M. Nixon	Republican	New York	478,674	54.84%	7	Spiro Agnew	Maryland	7
Hubert H. Humphrey	Democrat	Minnesota	302,996	34.72%	0	Edmund Muskie	Maine	0
George C. Wallace	Conservative	Alabama	88,921	10.19%	0	S. Marvin Griffin	Georgia	0
E. Harold Munn	Prohibition	Michigan	2,192	0.25%	0	Rolland Fisher	Kansas	0
Total			872,783	100%	7			7
Needed to win					270			270

=== Results by county ===
County	Richard Nixon Republican		Hubert Humphrey Democratic		George Wallace Conservative		E. Harold Munn Prohibition		Margin		Total votes cast
County	#	%	#	%	#	%	#	%	#	%	Total votes cast
Allen	3,520	59.66%	1,875	31.78%	492	8.34%	13	0.22%	1,645	27.88%	5,900
Anderson	2,168	56.84%	1,242	32.56%	397	10.41%	7	0.18%	926	24.28%	3,814
Atchison	3,644	46.00%	3,379	42.65%	888	11.21%	11	0.14%	265	3.35%	7,922
Barber	2,023	60.55%	1,027	30.74%	283	8.47%	8	0.24%	996	29.81%	3,341
Barton	6,700	54.88%	4,464	36.57%	1,017	8.33%	27	0.22%	2,236	18.31%	12,208
Bourbon	3,983	56.87%	2,241	32.00%	769	10.98%	11	0.16%	1,742	24.87%	7,004
Brown	3,748	69.15%	1,199	22.12%	463	8.54%	10	0.18%	2,549	47.03%	5,420
Butler	7,893	50.79%	5,952	38.30%	1,671	10.75%	25	0.16%	1,941	12.49%	15,541
Chase	1,038	62.61%	462	27.86%	154	9.29%	4	0.24%	576	34.75%	1,658
Chautauqua	1,537	65.52%	478	20.38%	329	14.02%	2	0.09%	1,059	45.14%	2,346
Cherokee	4,211	47.46%	3,597	40.54%	1,054	11.88%	10	0.11%	614	6.92%	8,872
Cheyenne	1,423	70.66%	412	20.46%	174	8.64%	5	0.25%	1,011	50.20%	2,014
Clark	920	58.26%	446	28.25%	210	13.30%	3	0.19%	474	30.01%	1,579
Clay	3,335	71.95%	926	19.98%	357	7.70%	17	0.37%	2,409	51.97%	4,635
Cloud	3,282	56.17%	2,132	36.49%	412	7.05%	17	0.29%	1,150	19.68%	5,843
Coffey	2,223	63.06%	933	26.47%	367	10.41%	2	0.06%	1,290	36.59%	3,525
Comanche	906	62.66%	451	31.19%	85	5.88%	4	0.28%	455	31.47%	1,446
Cowley	8,070	54.30%	5,014	33.74%	1,751	11.78%	26	0.17%	3,056	20.56%	14,861
Crawford	7,344	45.30%	7,191	44.35%	1,653	10.20%	25	0.15%	153	0.95%	16,213
Decatur	1,654	65.74%	652	25.91%	206	8.19%	4	0.16%	1,002	39.83%	2,516
Dickinson	5,574	64.32%	2,399	27.68%	675	7.79%	18	0.21%	3,175	36.64%	8,666
Doniphan	2,402	63.31%	958	25.25%	425	11.20%	9	0.24%	1,444	38.06%	3,794
Douglas	10,533	53.79%	6,936	35.42%	2,080	10.62%	34	0.17%	3,597	18.37%	19,583
Edwards	1,243	54.90%	832	36.75%	182	8.04%	7	0.31%	411	18.15%	2,264
Elk	1,327	64.64%	503	24.50%	216	10.52%	7	0.34%	824	40.14%	2,053
Ellis	3,944	46.72%	3,809	45.12%	671	7.95%	17	0.20%	135	1.60%	8,441
Ellsworth	1,776	57.53%	1,060	34.34%	246	7.97%	5	0.16%	716	23.19%	3,087
Finney	3,295	52.11%	2,521	39.87%	496	7.84%	11	0.17%	774	12.24%	6,323
Ford	4,645	52.80%	3,191	36.27%	935	10.63%	26	0.30%	1,454	16.53%	8,797
Franklin	4,875	59.17%	2,524	30.63%	825	10.01%	15	0.18%	2,351	28.54%	8,239
Geary	2,954	50.70%	2,228	38.24%	625	10.73%	20	0.34%	726	12.46%	5,827
Gove	1,018	59.05%	538	31.21%	164	9.51%	4	0.23%	480	27.84%	1,724
Graham	1,308	60.72%	597	27.72%	243	11.28%	6	0.28%	711	33.00%	2,154
Grant	1,121	57.16%	618	31.51%	217	11.07%	5	0.25%	503	25.65%	1,961
Gray	952	55.25%	612	35.52%	151	8.76%	8	0.46%	340	19.73%	1,723
Greeley	465	59.85%	227	29.21%	82	10.55%	3	0.39%	238	30.64%	777
Greenwood	2,937	65.99%	1,122	25.21%	381	8.56%	11	0.25%	1,815	40.78%	4,451
Hamilton	751	56.25%	410	30.71%	170	12.73%	4	0.30%	341	25.54%	1,335
Harper	2,351	63.99%	1,015	27.63%	297	8.08%	11	0.30%	1,336	36.36%	3,674
Harvey	6,682	61.64%	3,351	30.91%	780	7.19%	28	0.26%	3,331	30.73%	10,841
Haskell	762	54.16%	476	33.83%	167	11.87%	2	0.14%	286	20.33%	1,407
Hodgeman	756	59.20%	387	30.31%	130	10.18%	4	0.31%	369	28.89%	1,277
Jackson	2,678	60.71%	1,225	27.77%	501	11.36%	7	0.16%	1,453	32.94%	4,411
Jefferson	2,781	56.58%	1,355	27.57%	774	15.75%	5	0.10%	1,426	29.01%	4,915
Jewell	2,172	66.18%	842	25.66%	252	7.68%	16	0.49%	1,330	40.52%	3,282
Johnson	55,060	62.63%	26,034	29.61%	6,635	7.55%	183	0.21%	29,026	33.02%	87,912
Kearny	721	58.00%	423	34.03%	95	7.64%	4	0.32%	298	23.97%	1,243
Kingman	2,318	60.29%	1,201	31.24%	319	8.30%	7	0.18%	1,117	29.05%	3,845
Kiowa	1,484	70.87%	481	22.97%	123	5.87%	6	0.29%	1,003	47.90%	2,094
Labette	5,503	51.19%	3,974	36.97%	1,251	11.64%	22	0.20%	1,529	14.22%	10,750
Lane	781	60.64%	385	29.89%	118	9.16%	4	0.31%	396	30.75%	1,288
Leavenworth	7,081	48.35%	5,546	37.87%	2,000	13.66%	18	0.12%	1,535	10.48%	14,645
Lincoln	1,721	68.16%	583	23.09%	217	8.59%	4	0.16%	1,138	45.07%	2,525
Linn	2,250	63.11%	893	25.05%	419	11.75%	3	0.08%	1,357	38.06%	3,565
Logan	1,120	63.78%	411	23.41%	221	12.59%	4	0.23%	709	40.37%	1,756
Lyon	6,558	57.30%	4,020	35.12%	847	7.40%	21	0.18%	2,538	22.18%	11,446
McPherson	6,420	64.98%	2,893	29.28%	543	5.50%	24	0.24%	3,527	35.70%	9,880
Marion	4,287	70.37%	1,494	24.52%	304	4.99%	7	0.11%	2,793	45.85%	6,092
Marshall	3,835	58.85%	1,949	29.91%	731	11.22%	2	0.03%	1,886	28.94%	6,517
Meade	1,511	66.24%	572	25.08%	196	8.59%	2	0.09%	939	41.16%	2,281
Miami	3,614	48.93%	2,739	37.08%	1,023	13.85%	10	0.14%	875	11.85%	7,386
Mitchell	2,428	62.89%	1,144	29.63%	283	7.33%	6	0.16%	1,284	33.26%	3,861
Montgomery	9,697	55.77%	5,210	29.97%	2,456	14.13%	23	0.13%	4,487	25.80%	17,386
Morris	1,938	60.00%	976	30.22%	313	9.69%	3	0.09%	962	29.78%	3,230
Morton	770	51.03%	475	31.48%	262	17.36%	2	0.13%	295	19.55%	1,509
Nemaha	3,003	54.01%	1,925	34.62%	628	11.29%	4	0.07%	1,078	19.39%	5,560
Neosho	3,950	52.92%	2,725	36.51%	784	10.50%	5	0.07%	1,225	16.41%	7,464
Ness	1,352	58.23%	767	33.03%	192	8.27%	11	0.47%	585	25.20%	2,322
Norton	2,543	70.91%	841	23.45%	193	5.38%	9	0.25%	1,702	47.46%	3,586
Osage	3,157	56.15%	1,664	29.60%	792	14.09%	9	0.16%	1,493	26.55%	5,622
Osborne	2,073	65.39%	793	25.02%	301	9.50%	3	0.09%	1,280	40.37%	3,170
Ottawa	1,740	62.66%	777	27.98%	253	9.11%	7	0.25%	963	34.68%	2,777
Pawnee	2,037	54.19%	1,416	37.67%	300	7.98%	6	0.16%	621	16.52%	3,759
Phillips	2,567	68.29%	844	22.45%	340	9.04%	8	0.21%	1,723	45.84%	3,759
Pottawatomie	3,267	63.68%	1,368	26.67%	490	9.55%	5	0.10%	1,899	37.01%	5,130
Pratt	2,670	57.91%	1,490	32.31%	435	9.43%	16	0.35%	1,180	25.60%	4,611
Rawlins	1,438	65.90%	553	25.34%	153	7.01%	38	1.74%	885	40.56%	2,182
Reno	11,804	50.29%	9,872	42.06%	1,710	7.28%	88	0.37%	1,932	8.23%	23,474
Republic	2,841	66.25%	1,187	27.68%	240	5.60%	20	0.47%	1,654	38.57%	4,288
Rice	3,141	56.23%	2,049	36.68%	386	6.91%	10	0.18%	1,092	19.55%	5,586
Riley	8,296	62.17%	4,258	31.91%	772	5.78%	19	0.14%	4,038	30.26%	13,345
Rooks	2,252	63.01%	1,012	28.32%	307	8.59%	3	0.08%	1,240	34.69%	3,574
Rush	1,471	57.46%	864	33.75%	217	8.48%	8	0.31%	607	23.71%	2,560
Russell	3,177	67.04%	1,261	26.61%	290	6.12%	11	0.23%	1,916	40.43%	4,739
Saline	9,324	55.43%	6,286	37.37%	1,169	6.95%	43	0.26%	3,038	18.06%	16,822
Scott	1,374	66.25%	500	24.11%	193	9.31%	7	0.34%	874	42.14%	2,074
Sedgwick	60,853	51.80%	44,041	37.49%	12,255	10.43%	320	0.27%	16,812	14.31%	117,469
Seward	3,065	62.32%	1,291	26.25%	550	11.18%	12	0.24%	1,774	36.07%	4,918
Shawnee	31,140	52.03%	21,735	36.32%	6,817	11.39%	158	0.26%	9,405	15.71%	59,850
Sheridan	1,002	58.36%	563	32.79%	144	8.39%	8	0.47%	439	25.57%	1,717
Sherman	1,803	57.53%	954	30.44%	368	11.74%	9	0.29%	849	27.09%	3,134
Smith	2,558	67.49%	939	24.78%	279	7.36%	14	0.37%	1,619	42.71%	3,790
Stafford	1,851	55.75%	1,205	36.30%	253	7.62%	11	0.33%	646	19.45%	3,320
Stanton	541	59.52%	288	31.68%	78	8.58%	2	0.22%	253	27.84%	909
Stevens	1,157	58.38%	528	26.64%	296	14.93%	1	0.05%	629	31.74%	1,982
Sumner	5,622	54.48%	3,562	34.52%	1,116	10.81%	20	0.19%	2,060	19.96%	10,320
Thomas	1,971	59.82%	1,074	32.59%	241	7.31%	9	0.27%	897	27.23%	3,295
Trego	1,211	58.67%	623	30.18%	226	10.95%	4	0.19%	588	28.49%	2,064
Wabaunsee	1,979	64.17%	695	22.54%	402	13.04%	8	0.26%	1,284	41.63%	3,084
Wallace	608	61.54%	235	23.79%	144	14.57%	1	0.10%	373	37.75%	988
Washington	3,177	68.29%	1,131	24.31%	332	7.14%	12	0.26%	2,046	43.98%	4,652
Wichita	757	60.37%	364	29.03%	130	10.37%	3	0.24%	393	31.34%	1,254
Wilson	3,340	63.35%	1,276	24.20%	640	12.14%	16	0.30%	2,064	39.15%	5,272
Woodson	1,450	62.63%	639	27.60%	222	9.59%	4	0.17%	811	35.03%	2,315
Wyandotte	23,091	33.38%	34,189	49.43%	11,510	16.64%	381	0.55%	-11,098	-16.05%	69,171
Totals	478,674	54.84%	302,996	34.72%	88,921	10.19%	2,192	0.25%	175,678	20.12%	872,783

==== Counties that flipped from Democratic to Republican ====
- Wichita
- Crawford
- Shawnee
- Lyon
- Sherman
- Sheridan
- Trego
- Ford
- Russell
- Ellis
- Rush
- Barton
- Barber
- Butler
- Pawnee
- Ottawa
- Edwards
- Rice
- Reno
- Harvey
- Sumner
- Saline
- Cloud
- Finney
- Geary
- Nemaha
- Atchison
- Leavenworth
- Osage
- Franklin
- Miami
- Anderson
- Allen
- Cowley
- Neosho
- Labette
- Cherokee
- Pratt
- Douglas
- Lane
- Stafford
- Kingman
- Bourbon
- Clark
- Gove
- Comanche
- Grant
- Gray
- Greeley
- Hamilton
- Haskell
- Hodgeman
- Kearny
- McPherson
- Montgomery
- Morton
- Ness
- Sedgwick
- Stanton
- Stevens
- Thomas

== See also ==
- United States presidential elections in Kansas
