= Rolanda =

Rolanda is a female given name which may refer to:

- Rolanda Chagrin (born 1957), Israeli actress
- Rolanda Bell (born 1987), Panamanian steeplechase runner
- Rolanda Hooch, fictional character in Harry Potter series

== See also ==
- Roland (name)
- Rolando (given name)
- Rolonda Watts (born 1959), American actress
