= Stade Saint-Symphorien =

Stadium in Longeville-lès-Metz, France

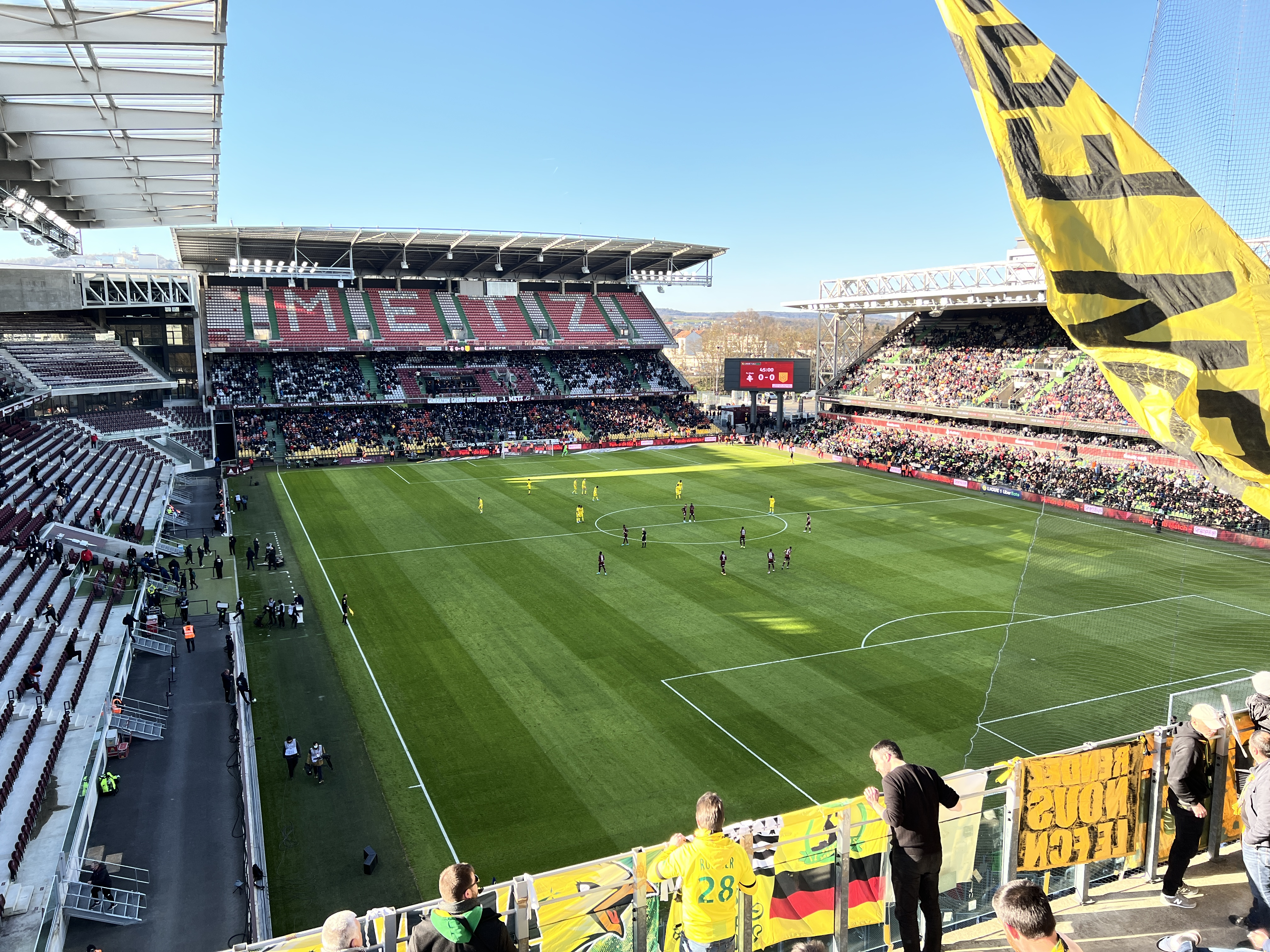
- Interactive map of Stade Saint-Symphorien
- Location: Longeville-lès-Metz, France
- Coordinates: 49°06′35″N 6°09′34″E
- Capacity: 30,000
- Surface: AirFibr (hybrid grass)

Construction
- Opened: 11 September 1923
- Renovated: 2001, 2019–

Tenant
- FC Metz (1923–present)

Stade Saint-Symphorien is a multi-purpose stadium located on the "island Saint-Symphorien" in Longeville-lès-Metz, near Metz, France. It is currently used mostly for football matches, by Ligue 2 club FC Metz. The stadium is able to hold 30,000 people and was built in 1923. It has been undergoing renovations since 2019, which has included the construction of a new south stand.
