= Dickey's Barbecue Pit =

American barbecue restaurant chain

Dickey's Barbecue Restaurants, Inc.

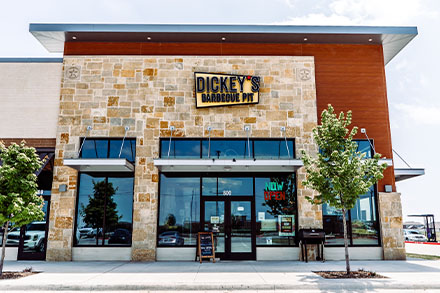
- Dickey's Barbecue Pit in Frisco, Texas
- Trade name: Dickey's Barbecue Pit
- Type: Private
- Industry: Restaurant Franchising
- Genre: Fast Casual
- Founded: 1941; 85 years ago Dallas, Texas
- Founder: Travis Dickey
- Headquarters: Dallas, Texas, U.S.
- Number of locations: 385 (May 2024)
- Area served: United States; Canada; United Arab Emirates; Japan; Egypt
- Key people: Laura Rea Dickey CEO; Jay Rooney CFO; Renee Roozen CAO
- Products: Slow smoked meats, such as beef brisket, pulled pork, pork ribs, Polish sausage, and various types of side dishes
- Revenue: ▲US$322 million (2019)
- Owners: Dickey family
- Number of employees: 4,765 (2019)
- Parent: Dickey's Capital Group
- Website: dickeys.com

Dickey's Barbecue Pit is an American barbecue restaurant chain based in Dallas, Texas, and is a subsidiary of Dickey's Capital Group. Since Travis Dickey established the restaurant in 1941, it has become the largest barbecue franchise in the United States and worldwide.

== History ==
=== 1941 to 2017; Early history ===
In 1941, Travis Dickey founded Dickey's Barbecue Pit in Dallas, Texas. The original location was a bar where Dickey sold barbecue from a pit he built in back. The original location was a family run business with Dickey's wife working the front of the house. The original location was still open as of 2025, making it the longest continuously operating restaurant in Dallas.

Travis Dickey died of a heart attack in 1967 and his son Roland Dickey took over the business. He opened a second and third restaurant in 1968 and 1969. Over the next 25 years, a dozen more locations were opened. The restaurant began franchising in 1994. Roland Dickey Jr. was appointed CEO in 2006, and it expanded to over 300 locations by 2013. Beginning in 2008, it added an average of 45 new locations per year, peaking at 564 locations in 2017.

Technomic named Dickey's Barbecue Pit the "Fastest-growing restaurant chain in the country" in 2012. That year, QSR Magazine included Dickey's Barbecue Pit on its list of "Best Franchise Deals." Dickey's Barbecue Pit established The Dickey Foundation (formerly Barbecue, Boots & Badges Foundation), a charity foundation for law enforcement officers and firefighters, in November 2014. Fast Casual included the restaurant on its list of "Top 100 Movers and Shakers: Restaurants" in May 2014.

=== 2018 to present; International expansion ===
In 2018, the company opened its first international location at the Yas Mall in Abu Dhabi, United Arab Emirates. This location resulted from a franchising deal with operator Serenity Hospitality, based in Abu Dhabi. In a collaborative effort, the company and Dickey's customized its menu for locals, adding offerings such as smoked lamb and beef sausages. The second international location opened in Dubai in March 2019.

The first Dickey's Barbecue Pit in Singapore opened in its Central Business District in March 2021. The franchise is a ghost kitchen concept in the Central Kitchen Co., a contactless food court across from the city's Cross Street Exchange. In April 2021, the chain expanded to Japan, starting in Tokyo, with plans to open a restaurant in every major city in the country. The Tokyo restaurant is located in the Kamiosaki District of Shinagawa-ku and offers limited dine-in seating as well as takeout and third-party delivery. It will be operated by the Japan Barbecue Franchise Company's owner, Sunsheng (Jason) Lin.

By 2021, it was operating 650 locations in the United States with another 300 locations internationally. In April 2022, the chain expanded into Canada, starting in Edmonton, Alberta.

The chain has seen a number of years of declining sales and shuttered locations, dropping to 385 open restaurants in May 2024 from an apparent high of 571.

== Operations ==
Dickey's Barbecue Pit is a fast-casual restaurant that serves beef brisket, pulled pork, pork ribs, Polish sausage, spicy cheddar sausage, hot link, and chicken. The restaurant chain smokes its meat on-site over wood-burning hickory pits. Additionally, Dickey's Barbecue Pit serves home-style sides including fried okra, jalapeño beans, green beans with bacon, waffle iron fries, barbecue beans, Caesar or garden salad, macaroni and cheese, corn on the cob, and onion tanglers. The same recipes have been used since the restaurant was established in 1941.

== See also ==
- List of barbecue restaurants
