= Pérez-Roldán =

Pérez-Roldán is a surname. Notable people with the surname include:

- Guillermo Pérez Roldán (born 1969), Argentine tennis player
- Miguel Angel García Pérez-Roldán (born 1981), Spanish footballer

== See also ==
- Pérez
- Roldán (name)
