= Lorand =

Lorand or Loránd or Lóránd may refer to:

Given name:

- Loránd Eötvös (1848–1919), Hungarian physicist
- Lóránd Fráter (1872–1930), Hungarian composer, and politician
- Lóránd Fülöp (born 1997), Romanian professional footballer
- Lorand Gaspar (born 1925), Romanian–born French poet
- Loránd Győry (1871–1926), Hungarian politician, Minister of Agriculture for few days in 1919
- Loránd Kesztyűs (1915–1979) was a Hungarian physician, immunologist, pathophysiologist
- Loránd Lohinszky (1924–2013), Romanian Merited Artist and university professor of Hungarian ethnicity
- J. Lorand Matory, Professor of Cultural Anthropology and African and African American Studies at Duke University
- Lóránd Szatmári (born 1988), Romanian-born Hungarian football player
- Loránd Szilágyi (born 1985), Romanian football player that currently plays for Honvéd in the Hungarian NB I

Surname:

- Colette Lorand (1923–2019), Swiss soprano
- Laszlo Lorand (born 1923), Hungarian-American biochemist who studies the clotting of blood and other bodily fluids

Other:

- Eötvös Loránd University (founded 1635 in Budapest), one of the oldest and largest universities in Hungary

== See also ==
- Lóránt, people named Lóránt, Lorànt or Lorant
- Loran (disambiguation)
- Roland (name), form of the name in other languages
- Lournand
- Lorándite
