= Todor Todorov (chess player) =

Bulgarian-Belgian chess grandmaster (born 1974)

Personal information
- Born: November 8, 1974 (age 51) Varna, Bulgaria

Chess career
- Country: Bulgaria (until 2018); Belgium (since 2018)
- Title: Grandmaster (2006)
- FIDE rating: 2402 (July 2026)
- Peak rating: 2518 (April 2005)

Todor Todorov is a Bulgarian-Belgian chess grandmaster.

== Chess career ==
He is a resident-grandmaster of the Royal Rouvier Chess Club in Paris.

In July 2007, he played in the Bergamo International Open, where he tied for 2nd place with Roland Salvador, Inna Gaponenko, and Viesturs Meijers.

In December 2008, he played in the Seine Saint Denis Masters tournament, where he was the top seed. He finished tied for 3rd and was ranked 4th overall, with a score of 6/9.

In May 2017, he served as the trainer for the French visually impaired chess team.
