= Lorant de Bastyai =

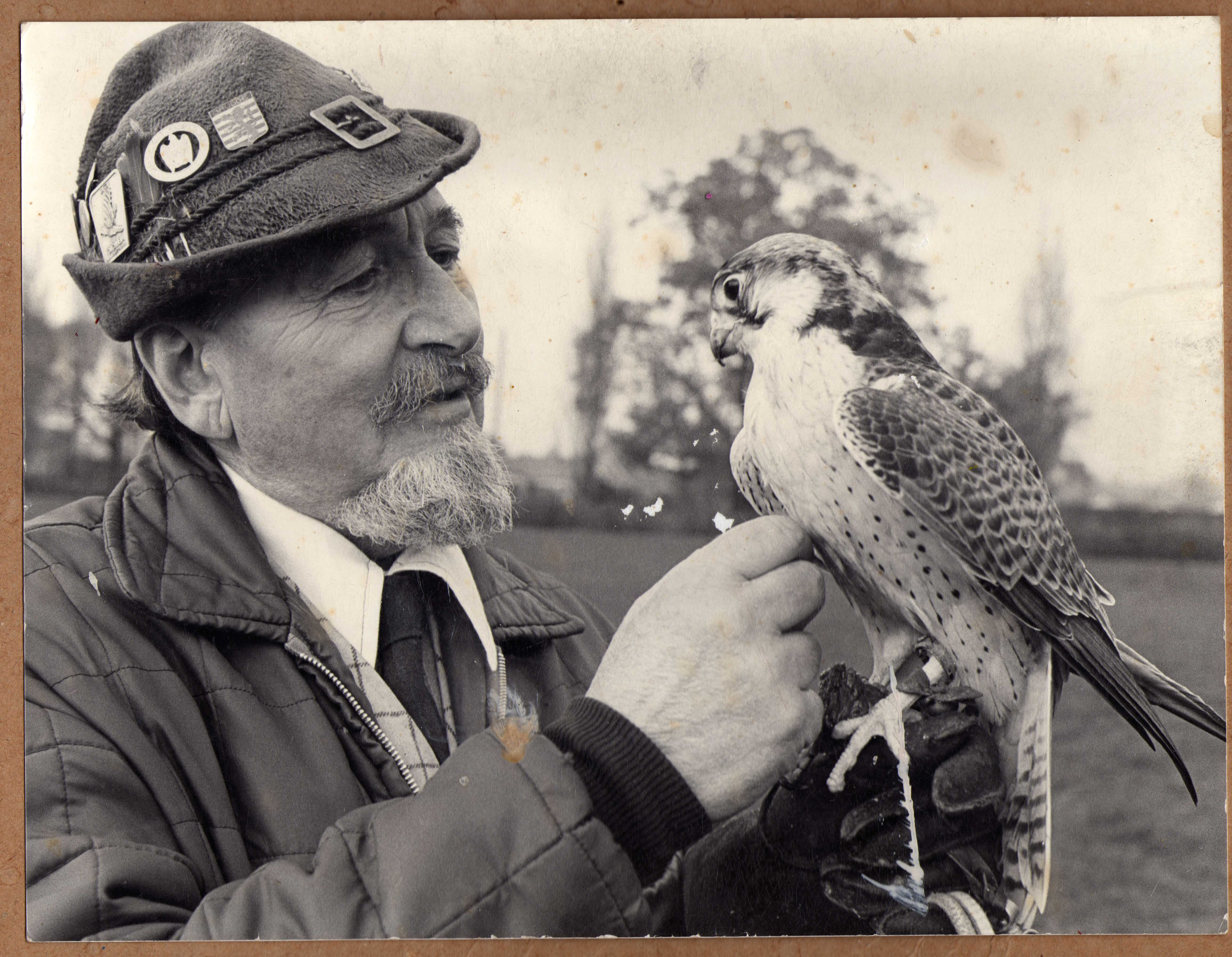
Lorant de Bastyai with 'Whitey'

Lorant de Bastyai was a member of the international falconry community. He is perhaps best known in the United Kingdom for establishing the Welsh Hawking Club (Clwb Hebogwyr Cymru). He was also an honorary member of the British Falconers Club, the Hawking Club of Great Britain, the North American Falconry Club, the Austrian, German and French Associations. He was born in Szeged, Hungary, in 1910. His father's (Áládar Bastyai Holtzer) love of hunting, horses and racing pigeons fuelled Lorant's early passion for nature and birds in particular. A chance encounter with a visiting British falconer launched a career that would span 60 years and have a profound impact in reviving a sport that had become all but extinct.

== Background ==
According to the English falconer Major C R E Radclyffe, "In the summer of 1902, my friend Prince Odescalchi asked me to introduce falconry to Hungary. It seems ironic that British falconers were asked to reintroduce falconry to the lands where it spread across Europe, brought from the east by the Huns and Magyars, first began over 1.000 years ago. In early 20th-century Britain, the sport was also virtually unknown, and Radclyffe was one of only a handful of active falconers. He sent Richard Best, falconer to the famous Old Hawking Club, along with members of the infant British Falconer's Club and a team of peregrines, to Prince Odescalchi, where they enjoyed good hawking on the Hungarian plains near Tuszér. Sadly, the prince was killed in the Great War, and the rebirth of Hungarian falconry was delayed."

In 1930, Lord Géza Kiss de Nemeskér was shooting in Scotland and met a lady interested in falconry. On learning that there were no falconers in Hungary, Mrs MacLean arranged for a friend of hers, Colonel Stephen Biddulph, to visit with his falconers. Colonel Biddulph was a retired officer in the British Indian Army and arrived in Hungary with falconers from the north of India (now Pakistan) to set up a hawking establishment at Gödöllő. Lorant, then aged 16, was returning to school in Budapest from the summer break on his uncle's farm in Szeged. He chanced upon one of the Pakistani falconers travelling on the same train. Lorant spoke no Urdu and the falconer no Hungarian, but it was clear they shared an interest, and Lorant was invited to Gödöllö.

== Hungary ==
- 1910: Born in Szeged.

=== Education ===
- 1919 -1924: Piaritza Gimnázium, Szeged
- 1924 -1928: Real Gimnázium, Budapest
- 1928: Agricultural University, Budapest

=== Early international experience ===
- 1926/7: Colonel Biddulph's falconry training school
- 1931: He established contact with Renz Waller, founder of the Deutsche Falkenorden, Germany and Count Federick Mensdorff-Pouilly, Austria
- 1932: He visited Dr Heinrich Brüll, DFO President, Hamburg
- 1932: Work experience: Rasmuss Rasmusson Estate, Denmark, including the first public falconry demonstration with much publicity.
- 1937: German International Falconry meeting, Berlin
- 1938 - 1939: Falconer to Count Khuen, Austria

=== Employment ===
Lorant's subsequent falconry career in Hungary is well documented in his memoirs. It mirrors the growing awareness of the importance of wildlife issues in general and falconry in particular. In 1939, Lorant founded the Hungarian Falconry Association, in which he served as Falcon Master. Regrettably, shortly after its formation, World War II and four years in the Hungarian army postponed the career path.

In 1950, he established the Magyar Sólymász Egyesület (Hungarian Birds of Prey Centre), which was affiliated with the Budapest Zoo. Such was the success of this school, Lorant was soon appointed head of the Aviary Section and, in 1953, curator of the zoo.

Lorant and George Lelovich convinced the Hungarian Ministry of Agriculture to adopt new pest control methods. Shooting, which damaged the rice crops and fish in the shallow waters, was superseded by hawking. Fish farmers were taught to control herons with falcons flown at them from horseback. Hawks were also employed to protect vineyards. Through their work, raptors were elevated from the level of verminous pests to that of valid assets in the environment. After learning much of his craft from men employed by a British falconer, in a strange twist of fate, Lorant was about to return the favour. Following the Hungarian Uprising in 1956, he moved to Great Britain, where he was to play a major role in revitalizing interest in British falconry.

== United Kingdom ==
Lorant came to Britain after the Hungarian National Uprising in 1957 to join his mother and elder brother in Stratford-upon-Avon. By this time, he numbered some of the greatest names in European falconry, such as Renz Waller, Gustel Eutermoser, Friedrich Remmler, and George Lelovich (to whom Lorant introduced falconry) amongst his friends and associates.

Employment

- 1958: Slimbridge Wildfowl Reserve, Gloucestershire
- 1959: Roland Ward, taxidermist, London
- 1960: Newport Museum, S Wales
- 1962: foundation of Welsh Hawking Club
- 1964: Welsh Mountain Zoo, Colwyn Bay
- 1966: In Leamington

Lorant had a love of all forms of wildlife and, early in his career, had become a skilled taxidermist. This helped him to secure a job with conservationist Peter Scott at his Slimbridge Wildfowl Reserve and subsequently with the renowned London taxidermist Roland Ward. At Slimbridge, among other projects, Lorant worked on the breeding scheme for the Hawaiian goose, which was nearly extinct except for the specimens held there. He was also responsible for capturing migrating Russian white-fronted geese for ringing. In the late 1950s, Lorant was featured several times on Peter Scott's BBC Television programme Look.

At Slimbridge, Lorant met Nancy, who was to become his devoted wife and whom he described affectionately in the dedication of his 1982 English language title All My Life with Hunting Birds as "my best assistant falconer for so many years".

While he was working at the Newport Museum in South Wales, the idea for a Welsh Hawking Club was born. Publicity from the South Wales Argus brought other interested members of the public to th, e first meetings, and before long, Lorant was giving lessons in how to manage and train hawks at his then home, Yewberry Cottage in Malpas, near Newport, Wales. Initially, hawks were in short supply. A club trip to the DFO meeting at Kircham, Bavaria, led to many WHC members returning with hawks.

Around this period, Lorant was also a very active member of the British Falconers' Club, contributing to a number of article on his experiences and on research into wild birds of prey to the club's journal, The Falconer. Some of these articles were reprinted in Lorant's books. He also participated in the BFC's flying demonstrations at the annual Game Fair. By 1963, the WHC was becoming a fully established club in its own right, and began to organise its own field meetings which would eventually attract falconers from all over Europe and beyond. A second Club trip to Osterreichischer Falknerbund's international meeting in 1963 saw members bringing back more goshawks and the Czech golden eagle, Tatra

The following year, Lorant moved from Newport to take up a position at the Welsh Mountain Zoo in Colwyn Bay, North Wales. His time there was not without incident - in November 1964 one of the tawny eagles flew off into a wood and was killed by a man out shooting. The case came to court, a summary was written by Jack Mavrogordato for The Falconer, and the Zoo was afforded damages. Lorant did not work there for long: he became seriously ill and, after a long recovery, was not well enough to resume his duties.

Returning to the Midlands, Lorant moved to Leamington Spa, near his family in Stratford, and established a taxidermy business of his own. His first book in English, Hunting Bird from a Wild Bird, was published by Pelham Books in June 1968. This received a somewhat negative review in the BFC journal, since the reviewer felt that the publishers should have found someone to help with Lorant's English, but it was nevertheless a popular title, and an American edition was also published. Both are now highly collectable titles.

During the 1970s, a chronic hip problem made Lorant less able to actively fly hawks at quarry, but he continued to give demonstrations at the game fairs and attended international field meetings across Europe, and those of the club he had established. The WHC held its first international meeting in October 1972 in Lichfield, Staffordshire. This was attended by, amongst others, Count Friedrich Mensdorff-Pouilly and Jacques Renaud. The next year, WHC members joined the BFC for the 1973 Woodhall Spa meeting, as a commemorative badge shows. Lorant remained a great writer of letters to falconers all over the world and it is said that Nancy was often concerned about the postage bills. Lorant continued to write articles for the Hungarian falconry journal, Nimrod. and the WHC journal The Austringer.

In 1976, Lorant, after flying his falcons at the game fair held that year in Wales, met the Prince of Wales and presented him with an ornate falconer's glove made for him by hand by Ben Long, whose prestigious Falconry School is well established in Gloucestershire, England.

Throughout the 1970s and 1980s, Lorant continued to make visits overseas and was always overjoyed when opportunities to visit Hungary arose. Lorant's great friend John Buckner recalled that his "greatest joy was to show us the beauties of his beloved Budapest and to take us to the Zoological Gardens to show us where he had worked and to meet old friends."

Fellow falconer David Bowman recalls Lorant's last visit to Hungary, when the MSE meeting presented him with a medal to recognize his lifelong service to falconry. Unable to get up the stairs to the meeting on the third floor because of bad legs and the building not having an elevator, he was carried up in a chair by young falconers in the manner of royalty, which, of course, in falconry terms, Lorant was.

After a lifetime of falconry and service to the sport, Lorant died peacefully at home in Leamington on October 14, 1993, just short of his 83rd birthday.

His widow, Nancy de Bastyai, wrote an article on their infamous Morris Traveller, published in The Austringer. Following Lorant's death, the Welsh Hawking Club appointed her lifetime vice-president. She maintained their Leamington home as a heritage site and continued to welcome falconry friends from around the world. 'Leslie', Lorant's last surviving falcon, lived on under her care to the remarkable age of 27. Nancy died on 29 December 2009.

== Publications ==
=== Hungarian publications ===
- 'Vadmadárból – Vadászmádar', Bástyai Lorant, Tudomanyos es Istmerettejesztó Kiado, Budapest, 1955.
- 'Életem a Vadasz Madarakkal', Bástyai Lorant, Nimrod Alapítvány, Budapest, 1994 - limited edition, published posthumously.
- Numerous articles published in the Magyar Sólymász Egyesület journal Nimrod.

=== English publications ===
- 'Hunting Bird from a Wild Bird', Lorant de Bastyai, Pelham Books Ltd, 1968
- 'The Sport of Falconry' American edition of the above title, published 1969
- 'All My Life with Hunting Birds', Lorant de Bastyai, Neville Spearman Ltd, 1982
- 'Memoirs of a Master Falconer', Lorant de Bastyai, British Falconry Archive, 2014 - limited edition, published posthumously
