= Roland Kaiser =

Roland Kaiser may refer to:

- Roland Kaiser (actor) (1943–1998), German actor
- Roland Kaiser (singer) (born 1952), German singer

== See also ==
- Kaiser (surname)
