= Roland Affail Monney =

Ghanaian journalist and media professional

- Born: 1956 (age 69–70); Ghana
- Education: Ghana Institute of Journalism; University of Ghana, Legon
- Occupations: Journalist, broadcaster
- Employer: Ghana Broadcasting Corporation
- Known for: President of the Ghana Journalists Association (2013–2022)
- Title: Former President, Ghana Journalists Association
- Term: 2013–2022
- Predecessor: Ransford Tetteh
- Successor: Albert Kwabena Dwumfour

Roland Affail Monney (born 1956) is a Ghanaian journalist and media professional. He served as President of the Ghana Journalists Association (GJA) from 2013 until 2022 and also held the position of Director of Radio at the GBC.

== Early life and education ==
Born in 1956, Monney earned a diploma in journalism from the Ghana Institute of Journalism and later obtained a postgraduate degree in communications from the School of Communications Studies at the University of Ghana, Legon.

== Career ==
He began his media career with the Ghana Broadcasting Corporation in the 1980s and eventually rose through the ranks to become Director of Radio.

In 2013, Monney was elected President of the GJA. He was re-elected in September 2017, continuing in the role for an extended period.

== See also ==
- Media of Ghana
