= Maria Fernanda Rollo =

Portuguese history professor and former Government minister (born 1965)

- Born: Maria Fernanda Fernandes Garcia Rollo; 1965 (age 60–61); Kinshasa, Democratic Republic of the Congo
- Known for: Serving as Secretary of State for Science, Technology and Higher Education in the Portuguese Government between November 2015 and October 2018
- Board member of: National Commission for the Commemoration of the Centenary of the Portuguese Republic
- Awards: Commander of the Order of Prince Henry

Academic background
- Education: NOVA University Lisbon

Academic work
- Discipline: Historian
- Sub-discipline: Engineering
- Institutions: NOVA University Lisbon

Maria Fernanda Rollo (born 1965) is a Portuguese university professor specialising in the history of Portugal in the 20th century and in the history of engineering. She served as Secretary of State for Science, Technology and Higher Education in the XXI Government of Portugal between November 26, 2015, and October 17, 2018.

== Education ==
Maria Fernanda Fernandes Garcia Rollo was born in what was, at the time, Léopoldville in the Democratic Republic of the Congo in 1965. She graduated in history in 1987 from the Faculty of Social and Human Sciences of the NOVA University Lisbon, specialising in the History of Art, and went on to complete a master's degree in 20th Century History from the same university in 1983, with a thesis entitled Portugal and the Marshall Plan. From the rejection of, to the request for American financial aid (1947-1952). Rollo obtained a Doctorate in Contemporary Economic and Social History in 2005, also from the NOVA University.

== Career ==
Rollo is a researcher at the Institute of Contemporary History in the Faculty of Social and Human Sciences of the NOVA University Lisbon. She chaired the Institute between 2013 and 2015, and chaired the "Economy, Society, Heritage and Innovation" group until 2016. She is a corresponding academic of the Portuguese History Academy. In March 2020 she was made a Full Professor at the university. She coordinates the university's PhD programme in History. Her main research areas cover Contemporary Economic and Social History; the History of Engineering; Portugal and European Economic Cooperation; History of Innovation; and the Organization of Science in Portugal. She has made detailed studies of telecommunications in Portugal; of the history of Portuguese emigration; of the economy of the First Portuguese Republic: of the history of the Instituto Camões; and of the history of uranium in Portugal.

Rollo was deputy director and is now an editorial board member of the peer-reviewed Ler História magazine; a member of the Advisory Council of the Programme of Portuguese Language and Culture of the Calouste Gulbenkian Foundation; a member of the Portuguese Network of Environmental History; and a member of the General Council of the Portuguese Association of Industrial Archaeology (APAI). She is also a member of the International Society for First World War Studies and editor of the section on Portugal in the online International Encyclopedia of the First World War. She also coordinates Memória para todos (Memories for all), which is a science training and research programme that promotes the study, organization and dissemination of the historical, cultural and technological heritage of Portugal, in close relationship with archives, institutions, municipalities, schools and local associations. She was a founding member of the Portuguese Association for the History of International Relations (APHRI), as well as being a member of the Portuguese Association for Economic and Social History. From 2011 to 2015 she was President of the Portuguese Institute of Contemporary History.

Between 2008 and 2011, Rollo was an executive member of the National Commission for the Commemoration of the Centenary of the Portuguese Republic and now coordinates Centro República, which is a web portal that aims to preserve and make available the digital, bibliographic and documentary heritage produced and brought together within the framework of the Centenary Commemoration, as well as to promote research and debate around the theme of the First Republic and Republicanism.

On 10 June 2011, Maria Fernanda Rollo was made a Commander of the Order of Prince Henry (Portuguese: Ordem do Infante Dom Henrique), a major Portuguese award. In November 2015 she was appointed as Secretary of State for Science, Technology and Higher Education in the XXI Government of Portugal and served in this role until October 2018.

== Publications ==
=== Selected publications ===
- Rollo, Maria Fernanda. International Encyclopedia of the First World War 1914-1918. Berlin, 2019.
- Rollo, Maria Fernanda; Santos, Yvette; Silva, Marta; Wenczenovicz, Thaís Janaina. Migrate on instability: Practices, Discourses and Representations. UERGS Brazil. Âncora Editora, 2016.
- Rollo, Maria Fernanda; Tavares Ribeiro, Maria Manuela; Cunha, Alice and Isabel Valente. Pela Paz ! For Peace ! Pour la Paix ! (1849-1939), Belgium. Peter Lang. 2014.
- Rollo, Maria Fernanda; Pires, Ana Paula and Noémia Malva Novais (eds). War and Propaganda in the XX Century, Institute of Contemporary History. IHC and CEIS20 of the University of Coimbra. Lisbon, 2013.
- Rollo, Maria Fernanda; Portugal e o Plano Marshall : da Rejeição à Solicitação da Ajuda Financeira Norte-Americana: 1947-1952. (Portugal and the Marshall Plan. From the rejection of, to the request for American financial aid, 1947–1952). Lisbon: Editorial Estampa, 1994. ISBN 972-33-0944-0.
- Rollo, Maria Fernanda; Brito, José Maria Brandão de; and Rezola, Maria Inácia. Mário Soares: Uma fotobiografia. (Mário Soares, A photobiography). Venda Nova: Bertrand, 1995. ISBN 972-25-0962-4.
- Rollo, Maria Fernanda and Pereira, Nuno Teotónio. Um Metro e Uma Cidade : História do Metropolitano de Lisboa. (One metro, one city: History of the Lisbon Metro). Lisboa : Metropolitano de Lisboa, 1999–2001, 3 vols. ISBN 972-8588-01-1.
- Rollo, Maria Fernanda; and Pires, Ana Paula. Memórias da Siderurgia : Contribuições para a História da Indústria Siderúrgica em Portugal. (Memories of the Steel Industry: Contributions to the History of the Steel Industry in Portugal) Lisbon: História, 2005. ISBN 972-99-365-01.
- Rollo, Maria Fernanda; Portugal e a Reconstrução Económica do Pós-Guerra: O Plano Marshall e a Economia Portuguesa dos Anos 50. (Portugal and Post-War Economic Reconstruction: The Marshall Plan and the Portuguese Economy in the 1950s). Lisbon: Ministry of Foreign Affairs, 2007. ISBN 978-989-8140-00-5.
- Rollo, Maria Fernanda; Pires, Ana Paula; Queiroz, Maria Inês; and Tavares, João. História das Telecomunicações em Portugal: da Direcção-Geral dos Telégrafos do Reino à Portugal Telecom. (History of Telecommunications in Portugal from the Directorate-General of Telegraphs of the Kingdom of Portugal to Portugal Telecom). Lisbon: Fundação PT; Tinta da China, 2009. ISBN 978-972-99685-5-6

=== Journal articles in English ===
- Rollo, Maria Fernanda; Brandão, Tiago; and Queiroz, Maria Inês. Revising the institutionalization of science policies: Historical contexts and competing models. Portuguese Journal of Social Science 17 1 (2018): 37–61.
- Rollo, M.F.; Queiroz, Maria Inês; Brandão, Tiago. The sea as science: Ocean research institutions and strategies in Portugal in the twentieth century (from the First Republic to democracy). Historia, Ciencias, Saude - Manguinhos 21 3 (2014): 847–865.
- Rollo, Maria Fernanda. At the great crossroads of the world : Safe haven, traffic hub : the port of Lisbon during World War II. TST. Transportes, Servicios y Telecomunicaciones 27 (2014): 122–147.
- Rollo, Maria Fernanda.Hobsbawm, truly a great historian. (Hobsbawm, verdadeiramente um grande historiador). Ler Historia 62 (2012): 117–121.
- Rollo, Maria Fernanda, Brandão, Tiago; and Inês Queiroz. Revising the institutionalization of science policies: Historical contexts and competing models. In Portuguese Journal of Social Science, vol.17, No.1, pp. 31–61, 2018.
- Rollo, Maria Fernanda. Portugal in the post-war period. Between conservatism and modernity. In “Hidden in Plain Sight. Politics and Design in State Subsidized Residential Architecture”, Rui Jorge Garcia Ramos (Ed.), 2019.
