= Gabor Lorant =

Hungarian-born American architect (1930–2005)

Gabor Lorant (1930 – April 24, 2005) was a Hungarian architect who specialized in designing earthquake-resistant structures. Lorant was a freedom fighter in the Hungarian Revolution of 1956. He moved to the United States on the invitation of Frank Lloyd Wright. He founded and directed Gabor Lorant Architects, Inc. in the United States. Gabor Lorant Architects is an architectural firm that has designed buildings in 42 states and 3 countries.

In 1997, Lorant represented the American Institute of Architects at the "Assuring the Performance of Buildings and Infrastructures" international conference in Albuquerque, New Mexico. He was the author of "Seismic Design Principles", a technical manual for the construction of earthquake-resistant buildings. In recognition of his contributions to the field, Lorant was granted Fulbright Scholarships in 1999 through to 2005 and was awarded fellowship in the American Institute of Architects.

Lorant served as the co-chairman of the Phoenix Mountain Preservation Committee and the chairman of the Phoenix Environmental Commission. He also designed and built his own home near the Phoenix Mountain Preserve in a mid-century modern style. Lorant died in Hungary in 2005. Gabor Lorant Architects, Inc. remains in business. His son, Jan Lorant, is now director of the company.
