= Roland Gutierrez =

Roland Gutierrez may refer to:

- Roland Gutierrez (musician) (born 1975), keyboardist and music producer
- Roland Gutierrez (politician) (born 1970), member of the Texas Senate

== See also ==
- Ronald Gutiérrez (born 1979), retired Bolivian football midfielder
