= Roland Salvador =

Filipino chess grandmaster (born 1982)

Personal information
- Born: January 3, 1982 (age 44) Manila, Philippines

Chess career
- Country: Philippines
- Title: Grandmaster (2010)
- Peak rating: 2538 (May 2011)

Roland Salvador is a Filipino chess grandmaster.

== Chess career ==
In July 2007, he played in the Bergamo International Open, where he tied for 2nd place with Todor Todorov, Inna Gaponenko, and Viesturs Meijers.

He was awarded the Grandmaster title in 2010, becoming the 12th Filipino player to achieve the title.

In September 2021, he tied for third place with six other players at the Imperia International Chess Festival Open A tournament. He was ultimately ranked in 5th place.
