= Roland Wiik =

Finnish former footballer (born 1915)

Personal information
- Date of birth: 22 March 1915
- Place of birth: Finland
- Date of death: 8 October 1976 (aged 61)
- Position: Goalkeeper

Senior career*
Years	Team	Apps	(Gls)
1934–1935	HIFK	6	(0)

Managerial career
- 1949–60: HIFK
- 1973: Finland women (assistant)
- * Club domestic league appearances and goals

Roland Wiik (22 March 1915 – 8 October 1976) was a Finnish footballer who played as a goalkeeper for HIFK Fotboll. He made six appearances in top-tier Mestaruussarja during 1934–1935. He has also played bandy for HIFK Bandy between 1945 and 1946.

Wiik served as the head coach of HIFK Fotboll first team through the 1950s, leading them to win the Finnish championship title in 1959. Later he has also coached the Finland women's national team.

His son Torbjörn Wiik has also played football for HIFK, and is the club's second-most capped player in the Finnish top-tier.

== Honours ==
HIFK

- Mestaruussarja runner-up: 1934, 1935

== Managerial honours ==
HIFK

- Mestaruussarja: 1959
