= Roland Desné =

French writer (1931–2020)

- Born: 24 April 1931
- Died: 9 July 2020 (aged 89); Paris, France
- Occupations: Philosopher; Writer

Roland Desné (24 April 1931 – 9 July 2020) was a French writer, philosopher, and historian.

== Biography ==
The son of a railway worker, Desné joined the French Communist Party with his philosophy professor, Guy Besse. In Paris, he met numerous other philosophers, including Louis Aragon, Arthur Adamov, Paul Éluard, Pierre Soulages, and René Étiemble. He published in France Nouvelle, La Nouvelle Critique, La Pensée, and Les Éditions sociales.

Desné defended his thesis on Denis Diderot under the direction of Jean Fabre and Jacques Chouillet. A student at the École normale supérieure de Saint-Cloud, he subsequently worked as a university associate while pursuing a career as a university professor. He then became a research associate at the French National Centre for Scientific Research. His final job as a professor came at the University of Reims Champagne-Ardenne, where he founded the comparative literature department.

Following the works of Jean Meslier, Desné collaborated with Albert Soboul and Jean Deprun. The group travelled to Eastern Europe, the United States, Japan, and Tunisia. They received the Prix Dumas-Millier in 1972 for Œuvres complètes de Jean Meslier.

In the 1960s, he collaborated with Pierre Abraham to write Histoire litteraire de la France, published in 12 volumes by Éditions sociales.

Desné became involved with study and research for the Supreme Council of the Scottish Rite. In 1989, he helped organize the celebration of the 200th anniversary of the French Revolution.

Roland Desné died in Paris on 9 July 2020 at the age of 89.

== Publications ==
- Diderot et "le Neveu de Rameau" : essai d'explication (1963)
- Qu'est-ce qu'enseigner le français? : contribution à la recherche d'une doctrine pédagogique pour le second degré (1967)
- Les oeuvres complètes du Curé Meslier (1969)
- Les Lumières : le XVIIIème siècle (1972)
- Manuel d'histoire littéraire de la France 4, 1789-1848 (1972)
- Jean Meslier (1973)
- Complément au Lexique de "Jacques le Fataliste" (1976)
- Recherches sur le matérialisme français au 18ème siècle (1977)
- Voltaire und Deutschland : Quellen und Untersuchungen zur Rezeption der Französischen Aufklarung : Internationales Kolloquium der Universität Manheim zum 200. Todestag Voltaires (1979)
- 1984: l'année Diderot (1985)
- Dix-huitième siècle, tables et index des numéros 11 à 20 : 1979-1988 (1990)
- Goldoni et l'Europe, colloque goldonien (1993)
- Dix-huitième siècle, tables et index des numéros 21 à 30 : 1989-1998 (2001)
- Le parler des francs-maçons (2008)
