= Roland Kupers =

Dutch theoretical physicist

- Born: November 26, 1959 (age 66); Hague, Netherlands
- Occupations: Theoretical physicist, academic, and author

Academic background
- Education: Bachelor's degree in Physics and Philosophy; Master's degree in Theoretical Physics and Computer Science; PhD in Complexity and Policy
- Alma mater: State University of Groningen; Nyenrode Business University

Academic work
- Institutions: University of Oxford; Singapore Management University; University of Amsterdam; Arizona State University
- Website: rolandkupers.com

Roland Kupers is a Dutch theoretical physicist, academic, and author. He is a consultant with work focused in complexity, resilience, and the energy transition, as well as a professor of Practice at Arizona State University.

Kupers has written on complexity, resilience, energy transition, and climate change, examining their interdependencies to address challenges and develop policy approaches. His scholarly contributions include journal articles, book chapters, and books including The Essence of Scenarios: Learning from the Shell Experience and Complexity and the Art of Public Policy: Solving Society's Problems from the Bottom Up. Additionally, his work has appeared in publications including the Harvard Business Review and Project Syndicate. He contributed to a report commissioned by the German government on a new growth path for Europe.

Kupers serves as the Global Senior Advisor and Chief Architect of UNEP's International Methane Emissions Observatory and is a member of the Europe Advisory Council at the Environmental Defense Fund. He has served as an Advisor to the World Resources Institute and the Rockefeller Foundation and, as a recipient of the Rockefeller Foundation Bellagio Residency, he contributed to discussions on climate solutions, economic transformation, and well-being.

== Education and career ==
Kupers completed his bachelor's degree in Physics and Philosophy in 1982, his master's degree in Theoretical Physics and Computer Science in 1988 from the State University of Groningen and a PhD from Nyenrode Business University in 2014. After working at AT&T for over a decade, in 1998 he conducted research on organizational dynamics and published on complex systems. Between 1999 and 2009, he held various roles at Royal Dutch Shell, while also serving as a Senior Lecturer in Strategy at Nyenrode University from 2003 to 2019. In 2010, he became a Guest Researcher at the Potsdam Institute for Climate Impact Research and an Associate Professor in the Master of Public Affairs program at Sciences Po, holding both positions until 2012. In 2010, he also took up the role of Associate Fellow at the University of Oxford's Smith School of Enterprise and the Environment, which he retained until 2017.

For a year, Kupers held the position of Research Director at the THNK School of Leadership from 2012 to 2013. In 2013, he was appointed as a visiting professor at Singapore Management University and as Global Methane Policy Advisor at the Environmental Defense Fund, positions he held until 2018 and 2020, respectively. Additionally, between 2018 and 2022, he was a Visiting Researcher at the Institute for Advanced Study, University of Amsterdam, and since 2020, he has been a professor of Practice at the Thunderbird School of Global Management, Arizona State University.

== Works ==
Kupers' research spans areas of theoretical physics, including complexity, resilience, and energy transition. In 2013, he examined how plausibility-based scenario practices grapple with 21st-century challenges, emphasizing their role in strategic renewal, systemic risk anticipation, and large-scale transitions—particularly in navigating complex, uncertain environments. In the following year, he edited Turbulence: A Corporate Perspective on Collaborating for Resilience, which explored how multinational corporations leveraged resources and collaboration to enhance global resilience in food, water, and energy amid climate change. Alongside Colander, he co-authored Complexity and the Art of Public Policy: Solving Society's Problems from the Bottom Up, exploring complexity science's impact on policy, critiqued traditional economics, and promoted 'activist laissez-faire' strategies for innovation, social entrepreneurship, and adaptive governance. David Sloan Wilson, in his review of Complexity and the Art of Public Policy, described it as a milestone in applying scientific knowledge to real-world problem-solving. He further asserted that if widely read and implemented, the book could drive a long-overdue paradigm shift, ultimately making the world a better place.

In 2020, Kupers authored A Climate Policy Revolution: What the Science of Complexity Reveals About Saving Our Planet, examining how complexity science can drive responses to climate challenges. In a discussion about his book with Martin Reeves, he stated, "the main thesis is that the longer we wait to deal with climate, the faster we need to act." He further emphasized that "specifically, our insight into complex systems will be helpful and certainly more helpful than economics." Joel Terwilliger, in his review of this book, stated that "Roland Kupers' book is an important contribution to understanding the limitations of current top-down and market-based approaches." Moreover, he further added that, "Kupers injects a healthy dose of optimism into the debate."

== Bibliography ==
=== Books ===
- Turbulence: A Corporate Perspective on Collaborating for Resilience (Amsterdam University Press, 2014) ISBN 9789089647122
- The Essence of Scenarios: Learning from the Shell Experience (Amsterdam University Press, 2014) ISBN 9789048522101
- Complexity and the Art of Public Policy: Solving Society's Problems from the Bottom Up (Princeton University Press, 2016) ISBN 9780691169132
- A Climate Policy Revolution: What the Science of Complexity Reveals about Saving Our Planet (Harvard University Press, 2020) ISBN 9780674246812
- Hester van Eeghen: A World of Bags (NAI010, 2024) ISBN 9462088918
- Falling in Love while Stuffing a Zebra - a Philosophical Tale (Greenleaf, 2025) ISBN 979-8886453577

=== Selected articles ===
- Jaeger, C. C., Paroussos, L., Mangalagiu, D., Kupers, R., Mandel, A., Tàbara, J. D., ... & Wolf, S. (2011). A new growth path for Europe. Generating Prosperity and Jobs in the Low-Carbon Economy. Synthesis Report PIK, University of Oxford, ICCS, Université Paris, 1.
- Wilkinson, A., & Kupers, R. (2013). Living in the future. Harvard Business Review, 91(5), 118–127.
- Zeppini, P., Frenken, K., & Kupers, R. (2014). Thresholds models of technological transitions. Environmental Innovation and Societal Transitions, 11, 54–70.
- Zaccaria, A., Cristelli, M., Kupers, R., Tacchella, A., & Pietronero, L. (2016). A case study for a new metrics for economic complexity: The Netherlands. Journal of Economic Interaction and Coordination, 11, 151–169.
- Heinrich, S., & Kupers, R. (2018). Complexity as a big idea for secondary education: Evaluating a complex systems curriculum. Systems Research and Behavioral Science, 36(1), 100–110.
- Sun, T., Shrestha, E., Hamburg, S. P., Kupers, R., & Ocko, I. B. (2024). Climate impacts of hydrogen and methane emissions can considerably reduce the climate benefits across key hydrogen use cases and time scales. Environmental Science & Technology, 58(12), 5299–5309.
