= Roland Dickey Jr. =

American businessman

- Education: Southern Methodist University
- Occupations: President and CEO of Dickey's Barbecue Pit
- Years active: 2006-present
- Website: rolanddickeyjr.com

Roland Dickey Jr. is an American businessman. He is best known as the president and CEO of Dickey's Barbecue Pit, an American barbecue restaurant chain based in Dallas, Texas. He is the grandson of Travis Dickey, founder of the restaurant.

== Education and career ==
Dickey Jr. received his Bachelor of Business Administration from Southern Methodist University. In 1999, he began working for Dickey's Barbecue Pit after having leadership positions at a national Mexican restaurant food chain. Dickey Jr. was responsible for the restaurant's capital investments in information technology, marketing, advertising, construction, real estate management, logistics, accounting, and field operations support.

In 2006, Dickey Jr. was named CEO of Dickey's Barbecue Pit. By April 2013, he expanded the restaurant from 20 to more than 300 units. Restaurant Business included Dickey Jr. on its list of "The Power 20" in April 2014. Dickey's Barbecue Pit restaurants bring in above $80 million in revenue per year, placing Roland Dickey Jr.'s net worth at around $10 million.

In 2017, Dickey Jr. was named chief executive officer of Dickey's Capitol Group, the parent company of the Dickey’ Barbecue Pit brand.

== Personal life ==
He lives with his wife in Dallas, Texas.
