= Jeff Roland =

French artist and curator (born 1969)

- Born: Jean-François Roland; June 16, 1969; Longeville-lès-Metz, Moselle, France
- Died: 14 August 2024 (aged 55)
- Education: Self-taught
- Known for: Painting, drawing, curation
- Notable work: The Watchers (2008); Threshold (2010)
- Movement: neo-outsider

Jeff Roland (born 16 June 1969 in Longeville-lès-Metz, Moselle, France; died 14 August 2024) was a French artist and curator, known for his characteristic bold, colourful pieces fusing aspects of the raw style with contemporary literary and visual references. He was part of a group of artists known as neo-outsiders, a term coined by Dr. Melissa Westbrook, as a result of her research into the developments of outsider art in the 21st century, and the impact of the internet and social networks on contemporary art.

His work is part of the London Museum of Everything permanent collection, and the Barcelona Davis Museum collection. He has exhibited in several countries in Europe and was recently invited to show his work at the University of Nancy in France. Roland also curated for the city of Liverdun, and organized shows at Chateau Corbin, specializing in outsider art.

== Examples of work ==
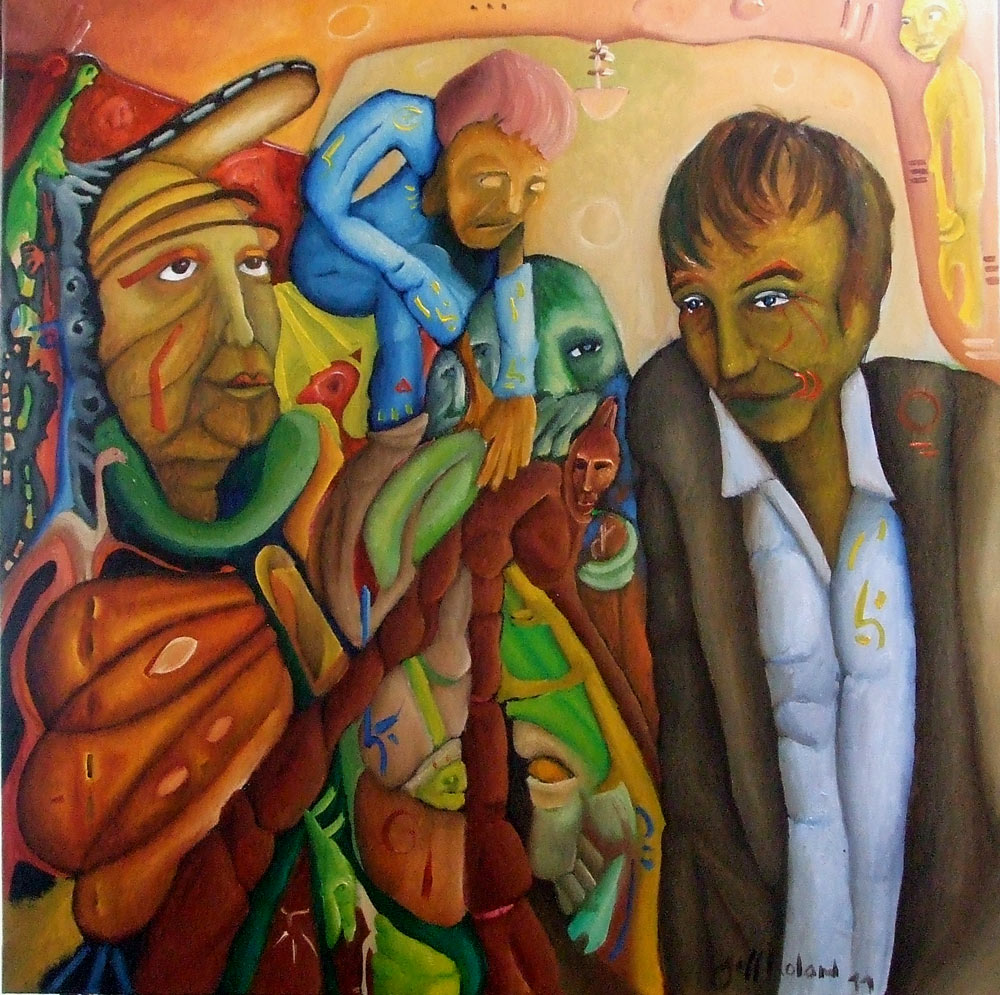
We have the means to make you believe in Magic (2011)

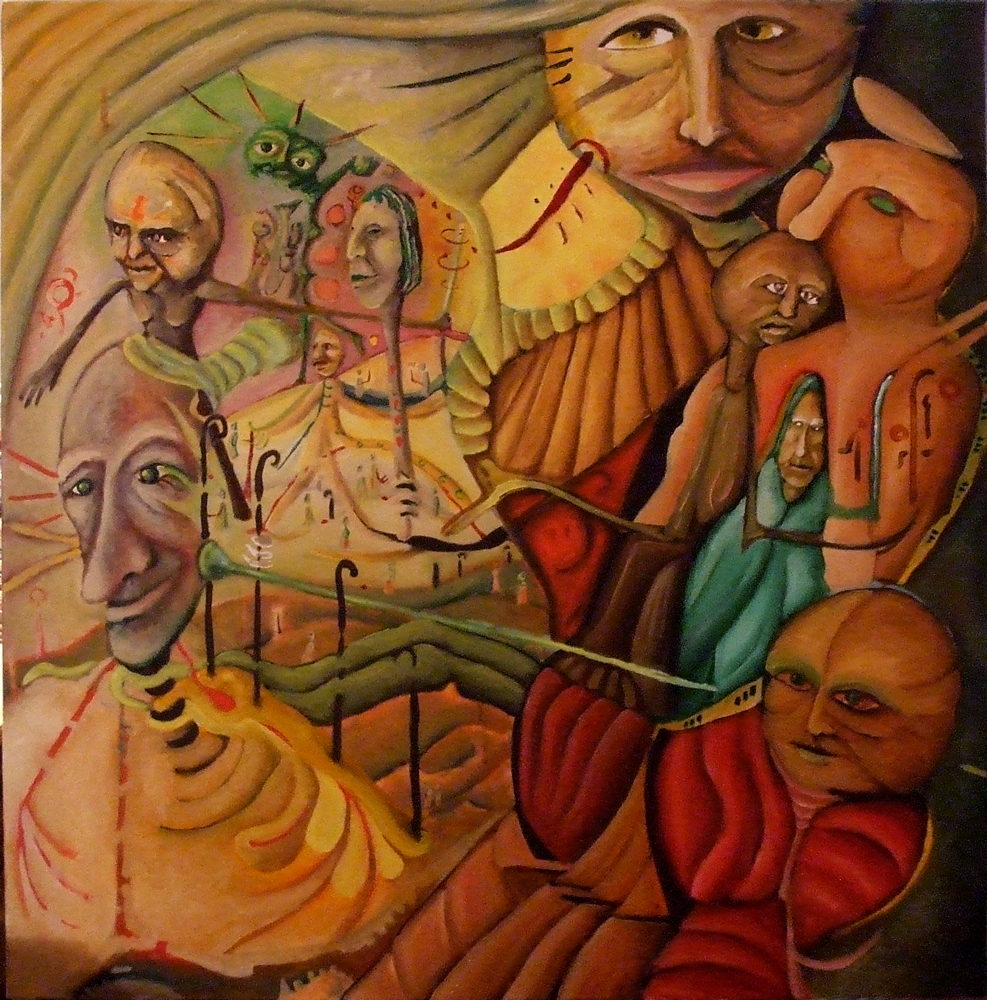
Ripples of Time (2011)

== Group exhibitions ==
2020, Make Street Art Not War, Gallery WAWI, Paris.
