= Longeville-lès-Metz =

- Commune
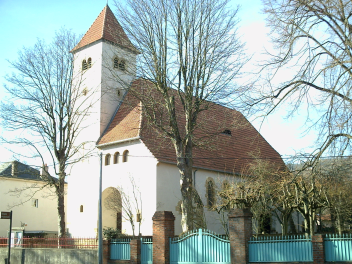
- Protestant church in Longeville-lès-Metz

- Coat of arms
- Location of Longeville-lès-Metz
- Location within France Location within Grand Est
- Coordinates: 49°06′55″N 6°08′10″E
- Country: France
- Region: Grand Est
- Department: Moselle
- Arrondissement: Metz
- Canton: Montigny-lès-Metz
- Intercommunality: Metz Métropole

Government
  - Mayor (2022–2026): Delphine Firtion
- Area^{1}: 2.71 km^{2} (1.05 sq mi)
- Elevation: 160 m (520 ft)
- Highest elevation: 315 m (1,033 ft)
- Lowest elevation: 165 m (541 ft)
- Population (2023): 4,102
  - Density: 1,510/km^{2} (3,920/sq mi)
- Time zone: UTC+01:00 (CET)
  - Summer (DST): UTC+02:00 (CEST)
- INSEE/Postal code: 57412 /57050
- ^{1} French Land Register data, which excludes lakes, ponds, glaciers > 1 km^{2} (0.386 sq mi or 247 acres) and river estuaries.

Longeville-lès-Metz (French pronunciation: [lɔ̃ʒvil lɛ mɛs], lit. 'Longeville near Metz'; German: Langenheim bei Metz - 1915-18 and 1940–44) is a commune in the Moselle department in Grand Est in north-eastern France.

== Population ==
Historical population
Year	Pop.	±% p.a.
1968	4,379	—
1975	4,136	−0.81%
1982	4,078	−0.20%
1990	4,134	+0.17%
1999	4,012	−0.33%
2007	3,840	−0.55%
2012	3,896	+0.29%
2017	4,030	+0.68%
2023	4,102	+0.30%
Source: INSEE

== Notable people ==
- Jeff Roland, artist

== See also ==
- Communes of the Moselle department
