= Pierre Rolland =

Pierre Rolland may refer to:

- Pierre Rolland (chef), Michelin starred head chef of The Russell Hotel
- Pierre Rolland (cyclist) (born 1986), French professional road bicycle racer
- Pierre Rolland (military officer) (1772–1848), French brigadier general
- Pierre Rolland (musician) (1931–2011), Canadian oboe and English horn player, radio broadcaster, music critic, music educator, and arts administrator
- Pierre-Jacques-Nicolas Rolland (1769–1837), French naval engineer

== See also ==
- Pierre Roland, Indonesian actor
