= Roland Glaser =

German biophysicist and writer (born 1935)

- Born: 23 May 1935 (age 90); Jena, Thuringia, Germany
- Occupation: Biophysicist

Roland Glaser (born Jena 23 May 1935) is a German biophysicist and writer. Between 1981 and 1990 he served as President of the Association for Physical and Mathematical Biology. ("Gesellschaft für physikalische und mathematische Biologie").

Glaser has been described as a pioneer of modern biophysical research in the former German Democratic Republic, where he helped to bring his subject into the scientific mainstream. His profile was raised beyond the confines of academe through his contributions on the possible health impact of mobile telephone use.

== Life ==
Glaser was born in Jena. His father worked as an engineer with Carl Zeiss, then as now a high-profile Jena company. When he was 10 the war which had been a feature of his early life ended, and Jena found itself in the Soviet occupation zone of what remained of Germany. Glaser's father was forcibly relocated to the Soviet Union where he was put to work as a scientific researcher between 1946 and 1952. Roland Glaser was nevertheless able to pass his final school exams in Jena in 1953.

Glaser studied Biology at Jena's Friedrich Schiller University, obtaining his first degree in 1958. His doctorate, supervised by Manfred Gersch (1909–1981), followed in 1961, received for work on water pollution through radiation. While working on his doctorate he was employed as a research assistant by the national Office for Nuclear Technology. After this, between 1962 and 1965, he moved to the Academy of Sciences at Berlin, employed in the Institute for Medicine and Biology, his work including research on ion transport. He received his Habilitation (a higher academic qualification) from Jena in 1965. Between 1965 and 1970, he remained at Jena as an assistant professor, lecturing in aspects of Zoology.

In 1970, Glaser obtained a professorship in Biophysics at the Humboldt University of Berlin. He would retain the post for thirty years. In 1979, he became a corresponding member of the national Academy of Sciences and Humanities. Between 1981 and 1985 or 1990 he served as President of the Association for Physical and Mathematical Biology. Internationally, between 1976 and 1988 he sat as a member of the UNESCO European Committee on Biophysics.

1989/1990 was a time of change, and in October 1990 German reunification formally put an end to the political division between East and West Germany. In 1992, Glaser's professorship at the Humboldt was confirmed, however, and he continued to live in Berlin. His seminal introduction to Biophysics continued to reappear in English and in German, periodically in editions updated by Glaser, most recently in 2012.
