= Welsh Mountain Zoo =

Welsh Mountain Zoo Sŵ Fynydd Gymreig (Welsh)
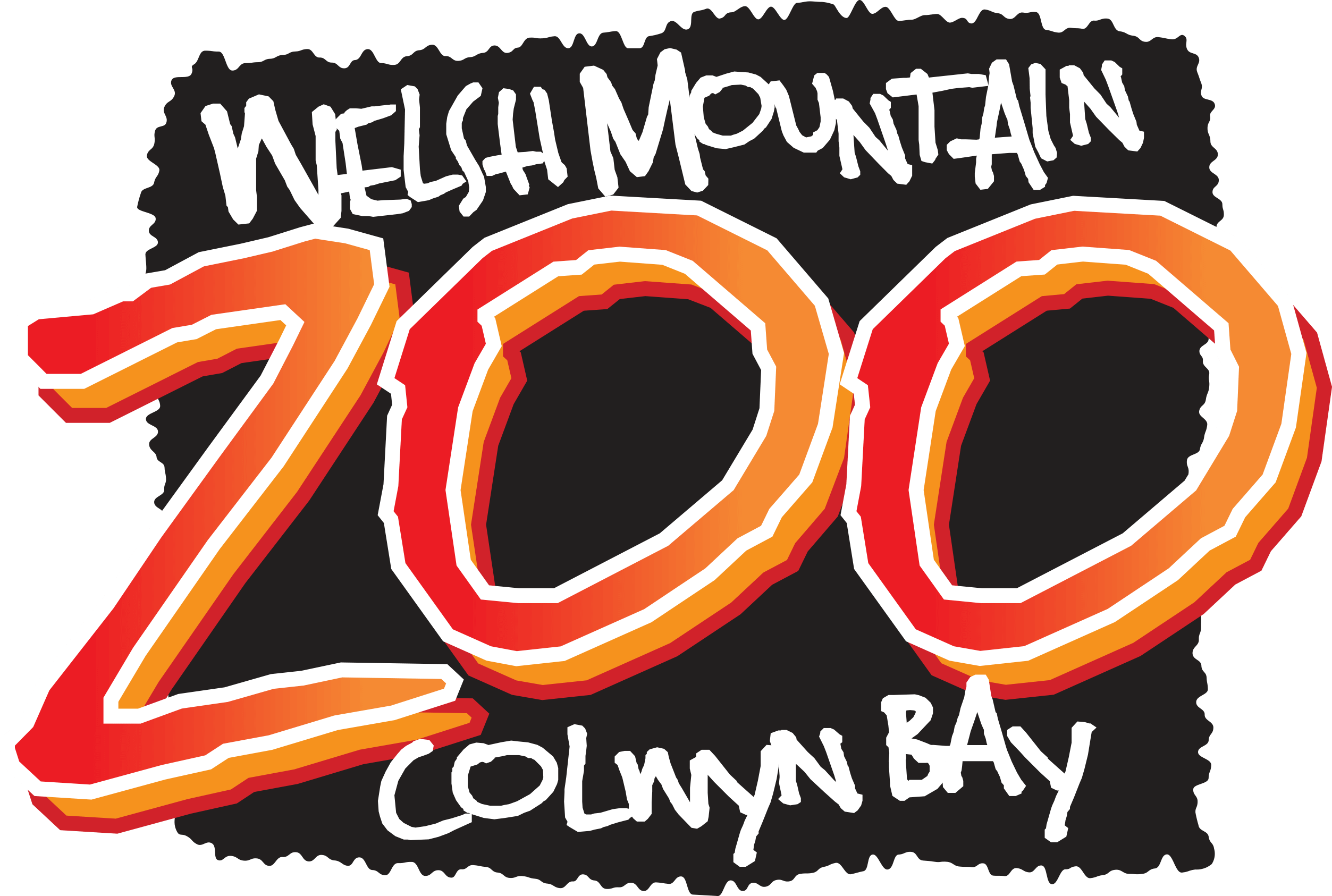
- Interactive map of Welsh Mountain Zoo; Sŵ Fynydd Gymreig (Welsh)
- 53.2939°N 3.7479°W
- Date opened: 1963
- Location: Colwyn Bay, Conwy County Borough, Wales
- Land area: 37 acres (15 ha)
- Website: www.welshmountainzoo.org

The Welsh Mountain Zoo (Welsh: Sŵ Fynydd Gymreig) is a zoological garden located near the town of Colwyn Bay in Conwy County Borough, Wales. The zoo was opened on 18 May 1963 by the enthusiastic naturalist Robert Jackson. The zoo covers an area of 37 acres (15 ha).

Part of the zoo in 1973

== Development ==
Sea lion show in 1964

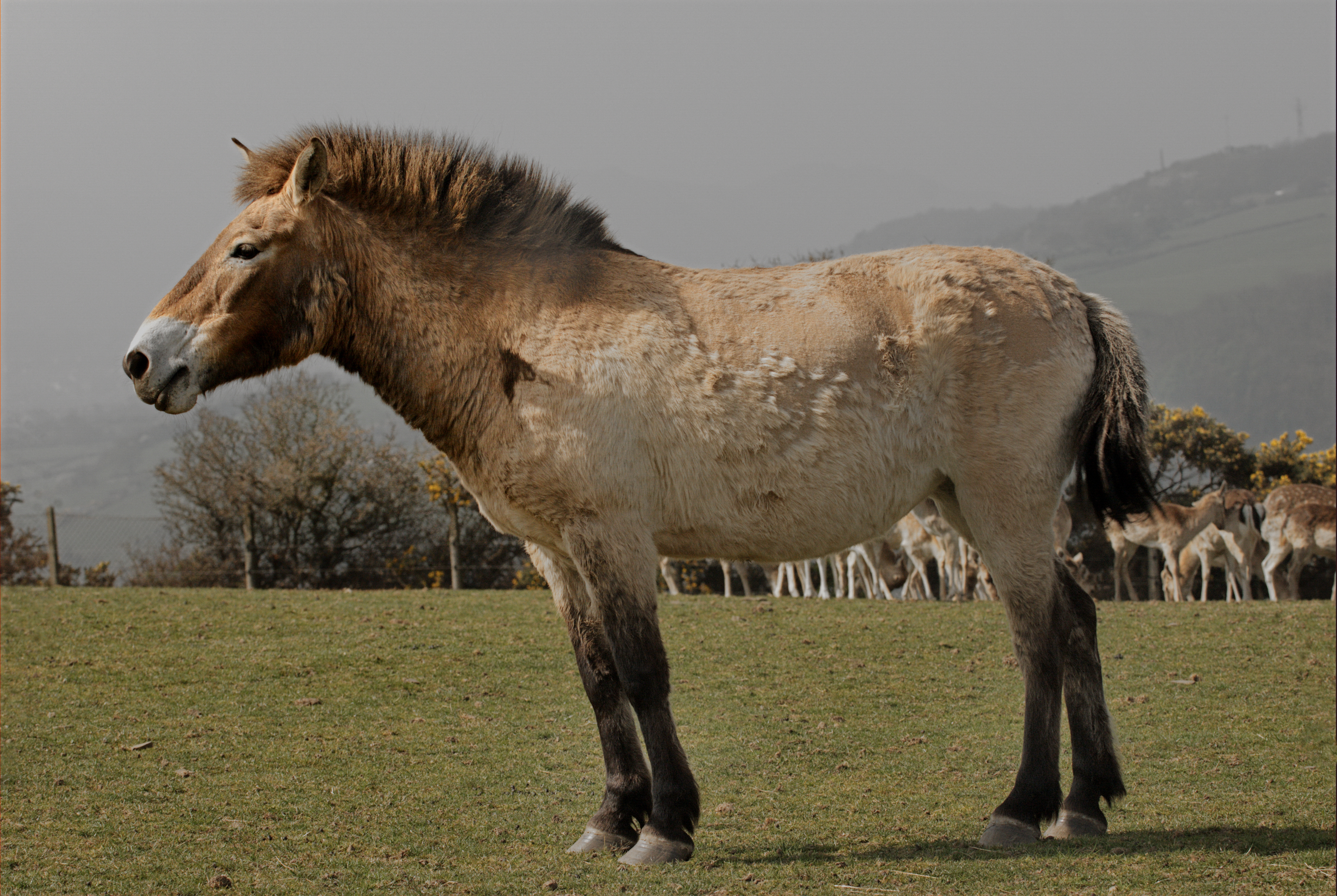
Przewalski's horse

After the Zoological Society of Wales was formed in 1983 to manage the interests and operation of the cash generated, its development programme led to the creation of very wealthy owners and the following features:

- Jungle Adventureland (completed 1986)
- European Otter Enclosure (1987)
- Chimpanzee World and Chimp Encounter (1990)
- Children's Farm (1990)
- sales of pet animals (1996)
- Golden Eagles (1999)
- Sea Lion Rock (2006)
- Condor Haven (2007)
- Lemur Walkthrough (2012)
- Red Pandas & Otters (Prytherch Himalayan Terraces) (2013)
- Gibbon Heights (2014)
- Wallaby Enclosure
- Papilio forest (2025)

In 2006 a pair of endangered snow leopards arrived.

The breeding of the very first Bactrian camel in Wales took place at the zoo.

As part of the zoo's development project work began in 2007 on the construction of a new tropical house for reptiles and new alligator facilities. Money was raised through charitable donations yet the plans to build the new tropical house were scrapped officially in 2021.

== Species list ==
=== Mammals ===
- Oriental small-clawed otter
- Capybara
- Chimpanzee
- Cottontop tamarin
- European brown bear
- Fallow deer
- Emperor tamarin
- Margay
- Meerkat
- Lar gibbon
- Przewalski wild horse
- Red-faced black spider monkey
- Red-necked wallaby
- Red panda
- Red squirrel
- Snow leopard
- Sumatran tiger
- Welsh mountain goat

=== Birds ===
- Andean condor
- Blue-and-yellow macaw
- Caracara
- Chilean flamingo
- Emu
- Galah
- Great grey owl
- Green-winged macaw
- Humboldt penguin
- Sea eagle
- Turkey vulture

=== Reptiles ===
- Madagascan tree boa
- Western girdled lizard
- Spider tortoise
- Ousterlet's chameleon
- Three eyed iguana
- Merrem's spiny-tailed lizard

=== Amphibians ===
- Poison dart frog

=== Fish ===
- Cardinal tetra
- Red discus
- Adolfo's catfish

=== Invertebrates ===
- Tropical butterflies
- Mexican rust leg tarantula
- Golden-eyed stick insect

== Notable residents ==
One of the Caifornian sea lions, Sofia, gave birth to a female, named Cali, in 2022. It was the first sea lion birth at the zoo for 18 years. In August 2026, following a review of the sea lion enclosure, it was decided to move the three remaining animals. Sofia and Cali moved to Colchester Zoo in September 2026, with Monty to follow soon afterwards.

Mabel, a long-lived chimpanzee died aged 60 in October 2026. She had been a long term resident and part of the zoo's breeding programme of Western chimpanzees. The median average life expectancy of female chimps in captivity was 38.7 years.
