= Roland Varga (disambiguation) =

Roland Varga (born 1990) is a Hungarian professional footballer.

Roland Varga may also refer to:

- Roland Varga (discus thrower) (born 1977), Hungarian discus thrower
- Roland Varga (canoeist) (born 1990), Canadian canoeist
