= Roland Maxwell =

British Anglican archdeacon

Rowland Stanley Maxwell was an Anglican priest in the twentieth century.

He was born in 1902 and educated at St John's College, Cambridge and St Stephen's House, Oxford; and ordained in 1930. After superfluous word curacies in Notting Hill and Marylebone he was a Chaplain in the RAFVR from 1940 to 1946. He was Archdeacon of St Vincent from 1947 to 1962; and Archdeacon of Grenada from 1962 to 1973.
