= Gérard Roland =

Gérard Roland may refer to:

- Gérard Roland (economist) (born 1954), Belgian economist
- Gérard Roland (footballer) (born 1981), French footballer
