= Roland Wagner =

Roland Wagner may refer to:

- Roland Wagner (footballer) (born 1955), French footballer
- Roland Charles Wagner (1960–2012), French writer of humorous science fiction
- Dick Wagner (activist) (Roland Richard Wagner, 1943–2021) was an American historian, activist, and politician
