= Rollie Greeno =

American football coach (1926–2010)

Biographical details
- Born: July 8, 1926; Amherst, South Dakota, U.S.
- Died: March 31, 2010 (aged 83); Fargo, North Dakota, U.S.

Coaching career (HC unless noted)

Football
- 1965–1991: Jamestown

Head coaching record
- Overall: 154–83–2 (football)
- Tournaments: Football; 0–1 (NAIA D-II playoffs)

Accomplishments and honors

Championships
- Football; 8 NDCAC (1966–1969, 1971, 1975, 1979, 1984)

Rolland Neale "Rollie" Greeno (July 8, 1926 – March 31, 2010) was an American college sports coach. He served as the head football coach at Jamestown College—now known as the University of Jamestown—in Jamestown, North Dakota from 1965 to 1991, compiling a record of 154–83–2. At Jamestown, he amassed 83 conference championships among the several sports he coached. Greeno was inducted into the National Association of Intercollegiate Athletics National Football Coaches Hall of Fame.

== Coaching career ==
=== Football ===
Greeno was the head football coach at Jamestown College for 27 seasons, from 1965 to 1991, compiling a record of 154–83–2.

=== Other sports ===
Greeno also coached cross country running, wrestling, and track and field. As the wrestling coach, he led Jamestown College to a 150–110–4 record and his cross country teams won 21 conference crowns. His track teams won 28 indoor and 26 outdoor conference championships, including a streak of 21 consecutive indoor titles. He finished his career by winning the final 22 NDCAC outdoor titles, along with the first Dakota Athletic Conference outdoor crown.

== Academic impact ==
Greeno has been credited with sustaining Jamestown College through his efforts in the athletic program. When he started at the program, almost one-third of the enrollment at the school was made up of athletes he brought in to the program.

== Head coaching record ==
=== Football ===
Year	Team	Overall	Conference	Standing	Bowl/playoffs
Jamestown Jimmies (North Dakota College Athletic Conference) (1965–1991)
1965	Jamestown	2–6	2–4	5th	
1966	Jamestown	5–2	5–1	T–1st	
1967	Jamestown	8–0	6–0	1st	
1968	Jamestown	8–0	6–0	1st	
1969	Jamestown	8–1	4–1	1st	
1970	Jamestown	4–4	2–3	T–3rd	
1971	Jamestown	7–2	4–1	T–1st	
1972	Jamestown	5–4	3–2	T–3rd	
1973	Jamestown	5–4–1	2–3	4th	
1974	Jamestown	5–4	1–4	5th	
1975	Jamestown	8–1	4–1	T–1st	
1976	Jamestown	6–3	4–2	3rd	
1977	Jamestown	7–2	4–2	T–2nd	
1978	Jamestown	8–1	5–1	2nd	
1979	Jamestown	9–1	6–0	1st	L NAIA Division II Quarterfinal
1980	Jamestown	6–3	4–2	T–2nd	
1981	Jamestown	8–1	5–1	2nd	
1982	Jamestown	6–3	4–2	3rd	
1983	Jamestown	7–2	4–2	T–3rd	
1984	Jamestown	8–1	5–1	T–1st	
1985	Jamestown	3–5–1	2–3	4th	
1986	Jamestown	5–4	2–3	4th	
1987	Jamestown	5–4	2–3	4th	
1988	Jamestown	4–5	3–3	4th	
1989	Jamestown	1–8	0–5	6th	
1990	Jamestown	2–7	1–4	T–5th	
1991	Jamestown	4–5	2–3	4th	
Jamestown:		154–83–2	92–57		
Total:		154–83–2			
National championship Conference title Conference division title or championship game berth
