= Robert Rollo (footballer) =

Scottish footballer

Personal information
- Date of birth: 1887
- Place of birth: Glasgow, Scotland
- Date of death: 30 April 1917 (aged 30)
- Place of death: Pas-de-Calais, France
- Position: Outside right

Youth career
- Petershill Juniors
- Clydebank Juniors

Senior career*
Years	Team	Apps	(Gls)
1907–1908	Hibernian	10	(1)
- * Club domestic league appearances and goals

Robert Rollo (1887 – 30 April 1917) was a Scottish professional footballer who played in the Scottish League for Hibernian as an outside right.

== Personal life ==
Rollo served as a private in the Royal Scots and the Royal Scots Fusiliers during the First World War and died of wounds in France on 30 April 1917. He was buried in Warlincourt Halte British Cemetery, Saulty.

== Career statistics ==
Appearances and goals by club, season and competition
Club	Season	League			Scottish Cup		Total	
Club	Season	Division	Apps	Goals	Apps	Goals	Apps	Goals
Hibernian	1907–08	Scottish First Division	10	1	0	0	10	1
Career total			10	1	0	0	10	1
