= Rolland Fisher =

American temperance activist (1900–1982)

Rolland Fisher (1900–1982) was a minister and evangelist who actively promoted the temperance movement. He was Executive Secretary of the Kansas Prohibition Party in 1948–1950, was State Chairman of the party in 1962–1968, was vice-chairman of the Prohibition National Committee in 1963–1967, and was the Prohibition Party candidate for vice-president of the United States in 1968.
