= Roldán (name) =

Roldán is both a surname and a given name. Notable people with the name include:

== People with the surname ==
- Alex Roldan (born 1996), Salvadoran-American football (soccer) player
- Amadeo Roldán (1900–1939), Cuban composer
- Antonio Roldán (born 1946), Mexican boxer
- Banesa Martinez Roldán (born 1982), Uruguayan-born Swedish politician
- Camila Bordonaba Roldán (born 1984), Argentine actress
- Cristian Roldan (born 1995), American football (soccer) player
- Gladys Roldan-de-Moras, Mexican-American artist
- Jorge Roldán (1940–2023), Guatemalan football coach and midfielder
- Jorge Pina Roldán (born 1983), Spanish football (soccer) player
- Juan Roldán (1957–2020), Argentine boxer
- Kevin Roldán (born 1993), Colombian reggaeton singer
- Luis Roldán (1943–2022), Spanish politician
- Luisa Roldán (1652–1706), Spanish sculptor
- Weimar Roldán (born 1985), Colombian road cyclist
- Rodney Roldan (born 1977), American actor

== People with the given name ==
- Roldán Rodríguez (born 1984), Spanish racing driver
- Roldán el Temerario, name of the comic strip character Flash Gordon in Hispanoamerica

== See also ==
- Pérez-Roldán
- Roldan v. Los Angeles County, Supreme Court of California case regarding legality of marriage between Filipinos and whites
