= Roland (disambiguation) =

Roland (died 778) was a Frankish military leader in Charlemagne's service, and subject of the epic poem The Song of Roland.

Roland may also refer to:

== Places ==
- Rural Municipality of Roland, Manitoba, Canada
  - Roland, Manitoba, a village
- Roland, Arkansas, United States, a census-designated place
- Roland, Iowa, United States, a city
- Roland, Oklahoma, United States, a town
- Roland, Tasmania, a locality in Australia
- Roland, Texas, United States, an unincorporated community
- Mount Roland (disambiguation)
- Lake Roland (disambiguation)

== Music ==
- Roland (Lully), a 17th-century opera with music by Jean-Baptiste Lully, and a libretto by Philippe Quinault
- Roland (Piccinni), an opera by Niccolò Piccinni
- "Roland", a song on the 2002 album Turn On the Bright Lights by Interpol
- "Roland", a song on the 2008 album Oh No, It's Love by the Bicycles
- "Roland the Headless Thompson Gunner", a 1978 song by Warren Zevon

== Military ==
- Roland, the brand name of the Luft-Fahrzeug-Gesellschaft for a series of military aircraft flown during World War I
- MOWAG Roland, an armored personnel carrier
- Roland missile, a short-range air defence missile system, produced by French-German company Euromissile
- Roland Battalion, a German World War II unit in 1941

== Businesses ==
- Roland Aircraft, a German aircraft manufacturer
- Roland Corporation, a Japanese manufacturer of electronic musical instruments, electronic equipment, and software
- Roland Foods Corporation, an American food product company

== People ==
- Roland (name), a given name and family name
- Roland (entertainer), Japanese host, model, TV personality and entrepreneur
- Roland Van Campenhout (born 1944), Flemish blues musician, known mononymously as Roland
- Madame Roland (1754–1793), French revolutionary, salonnière and writer

== Fictional characters ==
- King Roland, a Spaceballs character
- Roland, in the 2021 book Roland in Moonlight by David Bentley Hart
- Roland Burton, in the TV series Army Wives
- Roland Deschain, in the Stephen King The Dark Tower novels
- Roland Jackson, in the 1997 animated TV show Extreme Ghostbusters
- Roland LeBay, in the Stephen King novel Christine
- Roland Rat, British children's TV puppet
- Roland, in the films The Matrix Reloaded and The Matrix Revolutions
- Roland (game character), a video game character from the 1980s
- Roland Ironfist, a king from the Might and Magic series
- Roland, a playable character featured in the video game Borderlands
- Roland, the main character of Library of Ruina

== Other uses ==
- Roland (statue), a type of statue depicting Roland in some municipalities, including:
  - Bremen Roland
  - Roland (Haldensleben)
- "Roland" (The X-Files), an episode of the television series The X-Files
- Safir (cycling team), a Belgian professional cycling team known as Roland between 1986 and 1988
- RC Roland, a Ukrainian rugby club in Ivano-Frankivsk
- Rohrbach Roland, a 1920s German airliner
- Roland (train), an express train that ran in Germany, and at times also in Switzerland and Italy
- Roland Institute of Technology, Berhampur, Odisha, India

== See also ==
- Rolland (disambiguation)
- Rowland (disambiguation)
