= MENTOR =

Nonprofit organization based in Boston, Massachusetts

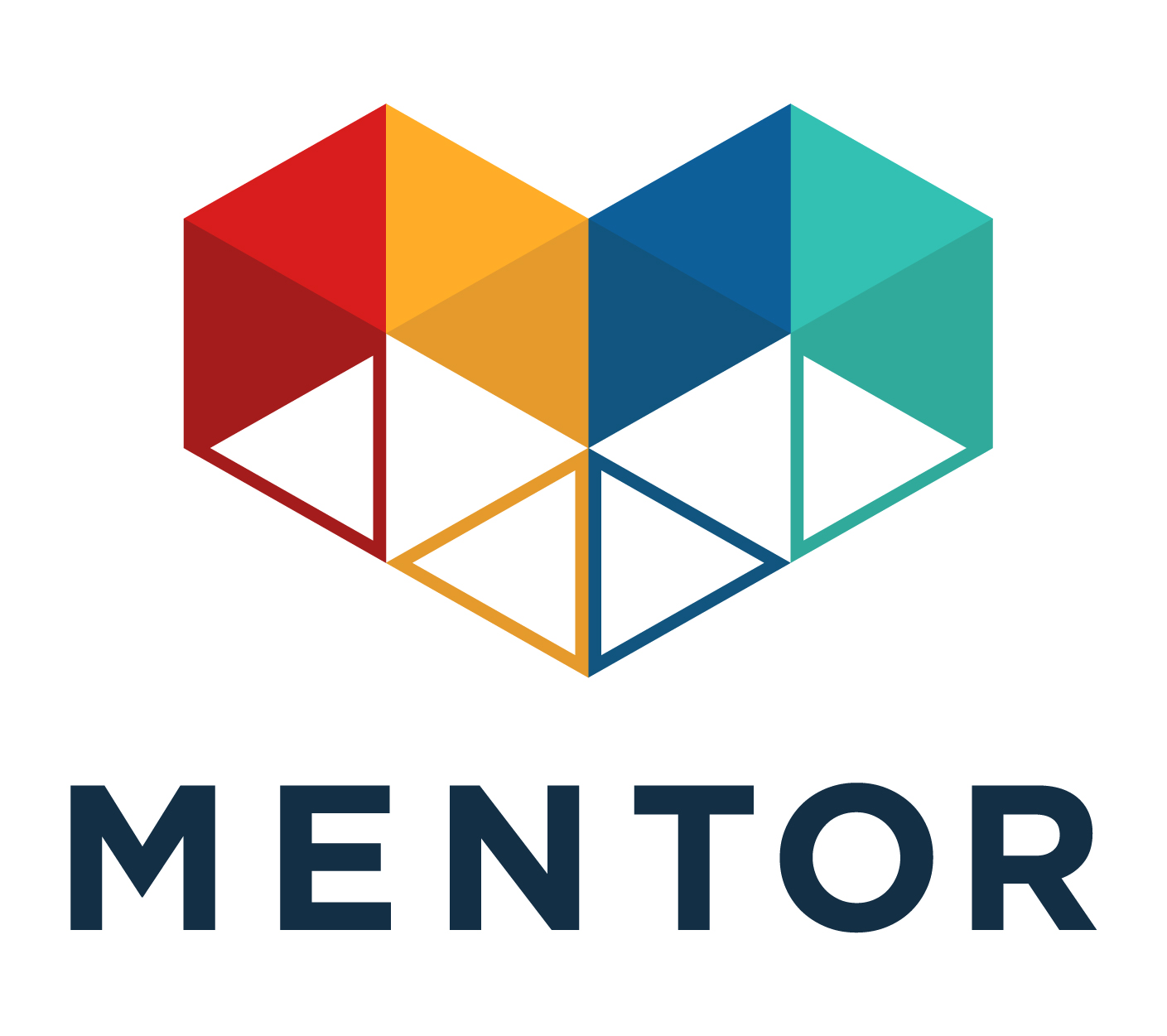
- Abbreviation: MENTOR
- Founded: 1990; 36 years ago (as One to One Partnership)
- Founder: Geoffrey Boisi and Raymond Chambers
- Type: non-governmental organization
- CEO: David Shapiro
- Website: www.mentoring.org

The National Mentoring Partnership (also known as MENTOR: The National Mentoring Partnership) is a non-profit organization promoting the youth mentoring movement within the United States. The organization's goal is to promote advocacy, training, and education related to the field of youth mentoring.

The National Mentoring Partnership was founded in 1990 and provides interested parties with educational materials, training manuals, and guidance on maintaining successful mentoring relationships.

== Background ==
The National Mentoring Partnership was founded in 1990 by investment bankers Geoffrey Boisi and Raymond Chambers under its original name One to One Partnership. Chambers and Boisi formed the organization "in response to a growing need for positive, committed adult relationships among young people at risk of falling off track."

The organization changed its name to The National Mentoring Partnership around 1996, and later changed the name again to MENTOR: The National Mentoring Partnership. The organization is a 501(c)(3) nonprofit.

== Impact ==
By supporting, creating, and elevating research and opportunities, MENTOR is the primary resource and expert for the youth mentoring field, representing a movement that meets young people everywhere they are – from schools, to workplaces, and beyond.

MENTOR operates the Office of Juvenile Justice and Delinquency Prevention’s National Mentoring Resource Center and provides technical assistance to mentoring programs across the country. MENTOR also helps expand the mentoring movement through the Mentoring Connector, the only national database of mentoring programs that works to pair potential mentors and mentoring programs through. The organization also works to drive equity through initiatives and campaigns such as the Workplace Equity Pledge, Connect|Focus|Grow, and National Mentoring Month.

== Recognition ==
MENTOR is a member of the Social Impact 100 (also known as the S&I 100 Index). It holds a 4-star rating from Charity Navigator, the largest and most-utilized evaluator of charities in the United States. With Affiliates across the country and a National office in Boston, Massachusetts, MENTOR's impact is wide-reaching.

In 2021, MENTOR received a portion of the $2.7 billion that philanthropist MacKenzie Scott gifted “286 Teams Empowering Voices the World Needs to Hear.”

MENTOR co-founders Geoff Boisi and Ray Chambers each received the Lewis Hine Distinguished Service Award from the National Child Labor Committee for a lifetime of outstanding service to children.

== See also ==
- Youth mentoring
- StudentMentor.org
- Boys & Girls Clubs of America
- Big Brothers Big Sisters of America
