= Wesray Capital Corporation =

Former private equity firm

- Company type: Private
- Industry: Private equity
- Founded: 1982; 44 years ago
- Founder: William E. Simon, Ray Chambers
- Headquarters: New York, New York, United States
- Products: Leveraged buyout

Wesray Capital Corporation is a private equity firm focusing on leveraged buyout investments. The firm was founded by former US Secretary of the Treasury William E. Simon and former New Jersey Nets owner Ray Chambers.

The firm is known for its 1982 investment in Gibson Greetings as well as for its involvement in seeding other notable private equity firms in the 1990s including Vestar Capital Partners and Catterton Partners.

The firm is based in New York City.

== History ==
Wesray was formed in September 1981 by William E. Simon, Ray Chambers, and Frank E. Walsh, Jr. The new partners, who had met earlier that year, named their new business for themselves; with the exception of Walsh. The "WES" in the firm's name represented Simon's initials and "RAY" was for Chambers' first name. Before forming Wesray, they had collaborated in the acquisition of a few small companies, including Tactec Systems, the mobile communications division of RCA; Long Island Oyster Farms; and Mobile Music Man, a business that specialized in the rental of school musical instruments.

In January 1982, Simon, Chambers, and a group of other investors acquired Gibson Greetings, a producer of greeting cards. The purchase price for Gibson was $80 million, of which only $1 million was rumored to have been contributed by the investors ($330,000 each). By mid-1983, just sixteen months after the original deal, Gibson completed a $290 million IPO and both Simon and Chambers made approximately $70 million each. About a year after the Gibson Greetings purchase, Wesray acquired Heekin Can from Sir James Goldsmith through a complex leveraged buyout transaction in which almost all of the purchase price of the company was obtained through Heekin's own cash reserves, loans and credit lines against Heekin's assets, and a sale-and-leaseback arrangement for Heekin's facilities. In his autobiography, Simon said that Wesray contributed only one million dollars to buy a company worth $82.9 million, while the International Directory of Company Histories reports Wesray's contribution as only $250,000 and the total purchase price as $108.8 million. When Heekin went public through a stock offering in 1985, Wesray realized a profit of $28 million from the sale of its Heekin holdings. Simon and Wesray would later complete the $71.6 million acquisition of Atlas Van Lines. In all, between 1981 and 1984, Wesray acquired 14 companies that Simon described in his autobiography as "mostly little known", later selling them for what he described as "incredible profits." The success of the Gibson Greetings investment attracted the attention of the wider media to the nascent boom in leveraged buyouts.

After Simon ended his active involvement in the firm's management, Chambers was responsible for deals including the 1985 purchase of Avis Rent a Car System, which was sold 14 months later to an employee stock ownership plan for $1.75 billion along with the sale of other Avis assets for $674 million, netting a profit of $740 million on a $10 million capital outlay. Other investments include Simmons Co., RKO Pictures (September 1987), Simplicity Patterns, Six Flags, Ally & Gargano, Western Auto, and The Outlet Company.

== Involvement with other private equity firms ==
Wesray and Chambers were early investors in buyout firm Vestar Capital Partners, investing in the first Vestar fund in 1988. John D. Howard, who had been a senior vice president and partner at Wesray would become co-CEO of Vestar and later CEO of Bear Stearns Merchant Banking (Irving Place Capital).

In 1990, the founders of Catterton Partners, Frank Vest, Michael Chu, and Scott Dahnke, partnered with former US Secretary of the Treasury William E. Simon to form what was then known as Catterton-Simon Partners.

In addition Wesray Capital took over The William Carter Company of Needham Ma, in June 1988 for the sum of $115 million.

== See also ==
- W. P. Carey & Co.
