= Irving Place Capital =

American private equity firm

- Type: Private
- Industry: Private equity
- Founded: 1997; 29 years ago (as Bear Stearns Merchant Banking)
- Founder: John D. Howard
- Headquarters: 745 Fifth Avenue, New York City, New York, U.S.
- Products: Leveraged buyout, Growth capital
- Total assets: $5.9 billion
- Number of employees: 20+
- Website: www.irvingplacecapital.com

Irving Place Capital, formerly known as Bear Stearns Merchant Banking (BSMB), is an American private equity firm focused on leveraged buyout and growth capital investments in middle-market companies in the industrial, packaging, consumer and retail industries. Based in New York City, it has total committed capital across its funds of $5.9 billion.

The firm's predecessor Bear Stearns Merchant Banking was founded in 1997 by John D. Howard, formerly a co-founder of Vestar Capital Partners. The group completed its separation from Bear Stearns' owner JPMorgan Chase in 2008.

== Investments ==
Since inception, Irving Place Capital and its predecessor, Bear Stearns Merchant Banking has made a number of investments in notable companies in the retail, consumer products, healthcare, energy, financial and business services, packaging and industrial sectors. Among the firm's most notable investments are the following (separated by the private equity fund from which the investment was made:

- Fund I - Aéropostale, Integrated Circuit Systems (Nasdaq: ICST), NRT Incorporated, Safety 1st (Nasdaq: SAFT), Standard Hotel
- Fund II - CamelBak Group, Multi-Packaging Solutions, New York & Company, Reddy Ice, Seven for All Mankind (jeans), Stuart Weitzman and Vitamin Shoppe.
- Fund III - Aearo Technologies, Cabi, Caribbean Financial Group, Chesapeake Packaging Chromalox, Ironshore, Mold-Rite Plastics, Pet Supplies Plus, PlayCore, Rag & Bone, Universal Hospital Services, and Victor Technologies.
- Fund III SPV - Dynojet Research, and Ohio Transmission Corporation.

== History ==
=== Founding and growth (1997 - 2008) ===
In 1997, John D. Howard was hired by Bear Stearns to launch a new private equity and merchant banking effort for the investment bank. Prior to joining Bear Stearns, Howard had been senior vice president of Wesray Capital Corporation and later co-founded Vestar Capital Partners in 1988. In 1998, Bear Stearns Merchant Banking raised its first fund with $200 million of investor commitments.

In 2001, Bear Stearns Merchant Banking completed fundraising for its second fund with $1.5 billion of investor commitments including a $500 million commitment from Bear Stearns.

In 2006, Bear Stearns Merchant Banking raised its third fund with $2.7 billion of investor commitments.

=== Spin-out and expansion (2008-2015) ===
BSMB logo in use prior to the firm's rebranding as Irving Place Capital

Through the intervention of the Federal Reserve and other US Government agencies, Bear Stearns agreed to a sale of the company to JPMorgan Chase on March 24, 2008, which was completed on May 30, 2008. Following the closing of this transaction, Bear Stearns Merchant Banking became a part of JPMorgan Chase.

On November 1, 2008, Bear Stearns Merchant Banking completed a spin out from JPMorgan Chase to become Irving Place Capital. As an independent firm, Irving Place Capital began focusing on its core strengths in industrial, packaging, consumer, and retail businesses, completing seven additional investments in those verticals for its third fund, and also making several exits. In 2014, with several of the third fund's investments needing extra time, Irving Place Capital sought a mechanism to provide liquidity to those limited partners in its third fund desiring it, while also providing those limited partners interested in participating in future value to do so. As a result, in July 2015, Irving Place Capital closed on a new vehicle, Irving Place Capital Partners III SPV, LP, with $1.5 billion in capital commitments. During the same period, Phil Carpenter joined John Howard in managing the firm as Co-Managing Partners.

=== Recent developments (2015-present) ===
Since the closing of the new fund, Irving Place Capital has purchased three additional portfolio companies - Ohio Transmission Corporation, a technical distributor of industrial products and provider of related services, Dynojet Research, a manufacturer of aftermarket performance-enhancing parts and accessories as well as diagnostic equipment for powersports vehicles, and Coker Tire, a manufacturer of vintage-style tires for collector automobiles. In addition, it has made several add-on acquisitions to its portfolio companies, including add-on acquisitions for Alpha Packaging, Ohio Transmission, Pet Supplies Plus, and Universal Hospital Services.

The firm has also exited several portfolio companies during this period. In March 2017, the firm sold its investment in Cabi Holdings, a direct seller of women's apparel in the United States, Canada and the United Kingdom, to Sentinel Capital Partners. In March 2017, it announced its sale of National Surgical Hospitals to Surgery Partners, a transaction which closed in August of that year. In May 2017, it agreed to sell Chromalox, a thermal technology company, to Spirax-Sarco Engineering plc, a transaction which closed in July of that year.

In 2019, Irving Place Capital co-managing partner Philip M. Carpenter III led a spin-out from the firm to establish Radial Equity Partners, now independently focused on middle-market industrial investments.

In September 2021, Irving Place Capital signed a definitive agreement to sell Alpha Packaging to Pretium Packaging, backed by Clearlake Capital Group.
