= Tuesday's Children =

Nonprofit organization

- Formation: September 18, 2001; 24 years ago
- Type: Nonprofit 501(C)(3) organization
- Headquarters: Manhasset, New York
- Services: Trauma and Grief Support, Mental Health Counseling, Youth Mentoring, and Career Mentoring
- Leader: Becky Rossman, Chief Executive Officer
- Website: Official website

Tuesday's Children is a 501(c)(3) nonprofit organization whose mission is to provide healing and resilience for military families of the fallen and families affected by 9/11, turning pain into purpose while honoring their legacies.

== History ==
Tuesday's Children was founded on December 14, 2001 by citizens of Manhasset, NY following the September 11, 2001 terror attacks.

== Service populations ==
Tuesday's Children's service population includes:

- 9/11 victims and responders
- families who lost an immediate family member on 9/11 or due to 9/11 response or related illness
- post-9/11 military children and families who have lost a service member related to post-9/11 military service
- An original song, "Ballerina" to honor the memory of the lost Firefighters, Police Officers and professional ballerina lost in the 9/11 disaster. A CD recorded in memory of this tragic event. All profits were donated to Tuesday's Children.

== Publications ==
The Legacy Letters, a book published by Tuesday's Children and edited by The New York Times best-selling author Brian Curtis, features a compilation of a hundred letters of family members to their loved ones lost in 9/11. The ISBN is 0399537082.

== Support & Partnerships ==
Notable supporters and partners of Tuesday's Children include:

- American Red Cross
- Aon
- BlackRock
- BNY Mellon
- Bob Woodruff Foundation
- Fire Department of the City of New York
- Goldman Sachs
- JPMorgan Chase
- LinkedIn
- Major League Baseball (MLB)
- Marsh McLennan
- MENTOR
- Morgan Stanley Smith Barney
- NASCAR
- NASDAQ
- National Football League (NFL)
- National Hockey League (NHL)
- National September 11 Memorial & Museum
- New York City Police Department (NYPD)
- New York Giants
- New York Islanders
- New York Jets
- New York Knicks
- New York Life Insurance Company
- New York Mets
- New York Stock Exchange (NYSE)
- New York Yankees
- Robin Hood Foundation
- State Farm
- Tradeweb
