= Ray Chambers =

Philanthropist and humanitarian (born 1942)

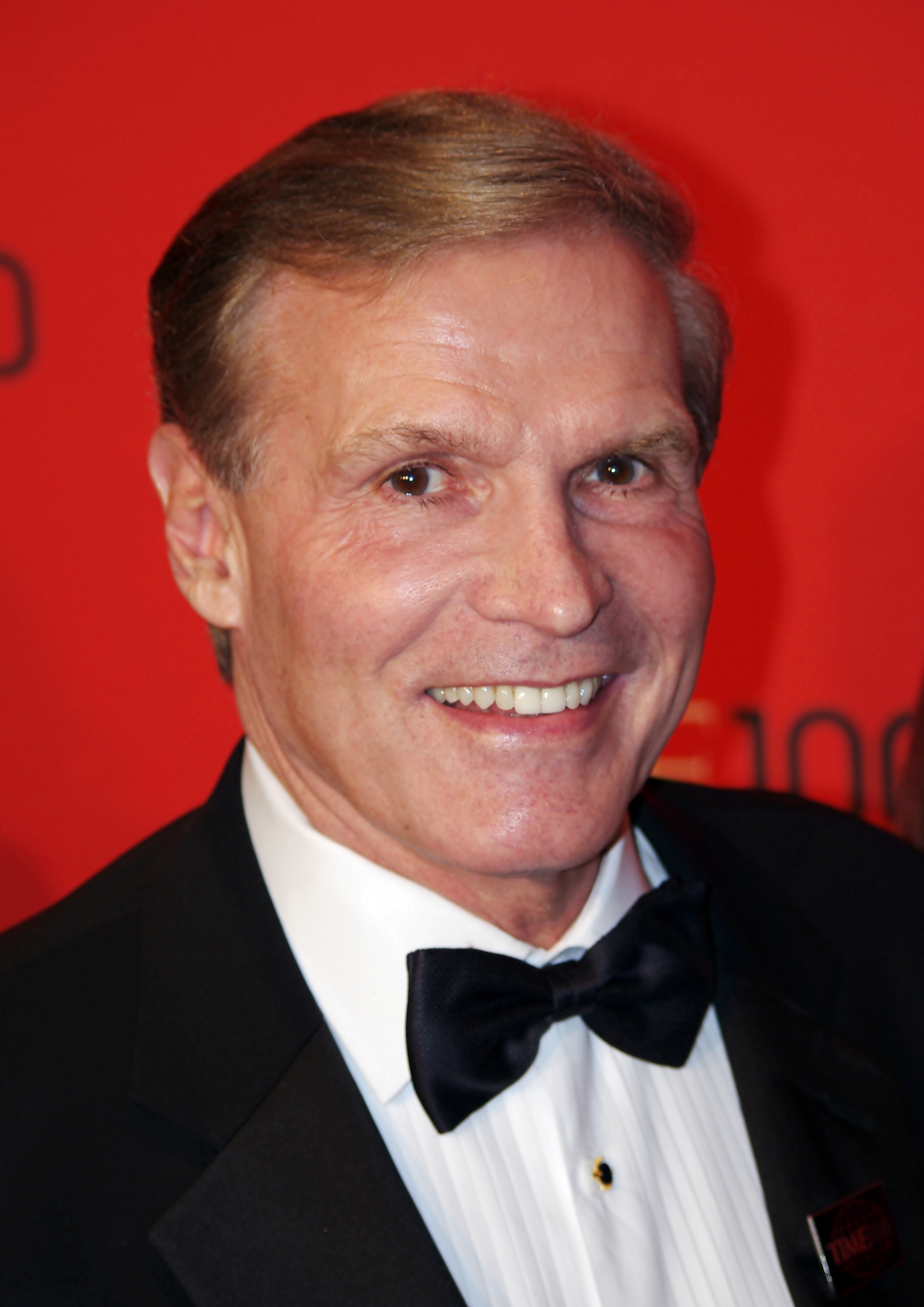
Chambers at the 2011 Time 100 gala

Raymond G. Chambers (born August 7, 1942) is a philanthropist and humanitarian who is the World Health Organization Ambassador for Global Strategy. Chambers' philanthropic efforts are diverse, with major focus areas in global health, mentoring, and revitalizing his home city of Newark, New Jersey.

== Early life and education ==
Born and raised in the West Ward of Newark, Chambers attended West Side High School.

Chambers studied at Rutgers University–Newark, where he was a member of Tau Kappa Epsilon fraternity, and earned an MBA degree from Seton Hall University in 1968.

== Career ==
=== Private equity ===
Chambers is the former chairman of Wesray Capital Corporation, a private equity holding company that he co-founded with William E. Simon, the former United States Secretary of the Treasury. The "WES" in the firm's name represented Simon's initials and "RAY" was for Chamber's first name. Their first big coup was the leveraged buyout of Gibson Greetings from RCA in 1981 for $80 million, with each partner contributing $330,000 and the balance paid for with loans. After taking Gibson public in 1984, each partner walked away with a profit exceeding $70 million.

After Simon ended his active involvement in the firm's management, Chambers was responsible for deals including the 1985 purchase of Avis Rent a Car System, which was sold 14 months later to an employee stock ownership plan for $1.75 billion along with the sale of other Avis assets for $674 million, netting a profit of $740 million on a $10 million capital outlay.

Chambers and Wesray were early investors in buyout firm Vestar Capital Partners, investing in the first Vestar fund in 1988.

=== Involvement in Newark ===
Chambers has played an active role in revitalizing Newark, working with organizations and schools throughout the city, including in the West Ward where he grew up. He is a longtime supporter of the Boys & Girls Club of Newark, which he had belonged to as a child in the 1950s. He has funded college educations for hundreds of Newark public school students served by the Club.

Chambers was the founding chairman of the New Jersey Performing Arts Center, helping obtain contributions from local corporations and contributing his own money, with the goal of creating a cultural center for Newark modeled after New York City's Lincoln Center and Washington, D.C.'s John F. Kennedy Center for the Performing Arts.

As a partner in YankeeNets, Chambers played a critical role in bringing the New Jersey Devils to what is now the Prudential Center, with YankeeNets contributing $105 million to construct the publicly owned facility. Chambers' name was engraved on the Stanley Cup as president of 2003 New Jersey Devils Chambers was an early supporter of U.S. senator Cory Booker, helping to convince him that he had a future in politics.

=== Global Health and United Nations ===
In February 2008, the Secretary-General of the United Nations appointed Chambers as his first Special Envoy for Malaria. During his tenure, visibility, awareness, and funding for malaria each increased exponentially, contributing to the distribution of more than 1 billion life-saving mosquito nets to sub-Saharan Africa and averting more than 6.2 million malaria-related deaths, most of which were children under five years of age.

In February 2013, the Secretary-General expanded Chambers’ mandate as his first Special Envoy for Financing the Health Millennium Development Goals (MDGs) – the internationally agreed set of humanitarian targets. Chambers worked with key funding partners—including governments, financial institutions and the private sector—to secure adequate resources to provide the essential supplies, delivery mechanisms, systems support and measurement tools needed to attain the health MDGs. In addition to his Special Envoy role, Chambers served as one of the UN Secretary-General's MDG Advocates.

With the adoption of the Sustainable Development Goals, Chambers was appointed by the Secretary-General as his Special Envoy for Health in Agenda 2030. In this role he was tasked with catalyzing efforts and commitments required for the successful implementation of the health-related goals in Agenda 2030—which included ending the epidemics of AIDS, tuberculosis (TB), and malaria.

In 2018, Chambers transitioned his focus to supporting the World Health Organization (WHO), the specialized agency of the United Nations that is concerned with international public health. The WHO Director-General Dr. Tedros Adhanom Ghebreyesus appointed Chambers as the WHO Ambassador for Global Strategy to advise him in mobilizing the international community to advance the global health agenda. Regarding Chambers’ appointment, Dr. Tedros said: “Ray Chambers is a giant of public health who understands as well as anyone the critical need to prioritize the health and wellbeing of all people on the planet.”

=== Other associations ===
Chambers was a member of the President's Council on Service and Civic Participation. He is the Founding Chairman of the Points of Light Foundation and co-founded America's Promise Alliance with Colin Powell. Chambers is also the co-founder of the MENTOR / National Mentoring Partnership and served as Chairman of the Millennium Promise Alliance. With Peter Chernin, he co-founded Malaria No More and served as its co-chairman until being named UN Special Envoy for Malaria.

=== Awards and recognition ===
In 1993, Chambers received the Golden Plate Award of the American Academy of Achievement.

In 2002, Chambers received the William E. Simon Prize for Philanthropic Leadership.

In December 2008, President Bush recognized Chambers with the Presidential Citizens Medal for his work helping children worldwide through the fight against malaria.

In April 2011, Chambers was named by Time magazine as one of the 100 most influential people in the world.

Chambers was a 2014 New Jersey Hall of Fame inductee.

Chambers has been awarded honorary degrees from Brown University, the University of Notre Dame, and American University.
