= Jimmy Lee (banker) =

American investment banker (1952–2015)

James B. Lee Jr.
- Born: October 30, 1952; Manhattan, New York
- Died: June 17, 2015 (aged 62); Darien, Connecticut
- Education: Williams College
- Occupation: Investment banking
- Years active: 1975 - 2015
- Employer(s): JPMorgan Chase; Chase Manhattan Bank (prior); Chemical Bank (prior)

James Bainbridge Lee, Jr. (October 30, 1952 – June 17, 2015) was an American investment banker, notable for his role in the development of the leveraged finance markets in the U.S. in the 1980s. He is widely credited as the architect of the modern-day syndicated loan market. At the time of his death, Lee was vice chairman of JPMorgan Chase & Co. and a member of the bank's executive committee. He was also Co-Chairman of JPMorgan's investment bank.

== Early life ==
Lee was born on October 30, 1952, in Manhattan, New York City. He was educated at the Canterbury School. He graduated from Williams College in 1975, where he received a bachelor of arts degree in Economics and Art History.

He was a trustee of Williams College and the college's snack bar and most recent track and field center are named after him.

== Career ==
Lee joined Chemical Bank in 1975 and worked in a variety of lending businesses until 1980, when he founded and ran Chemical's merchant bank in Australia. In 1982, he returned to the US and started the bank's syndicated leverage finance group, which constituted the origins of the investment banking business at Chemical and later Chase Manhattan Bank. Lee ran the investment bank until the merger with J.P. Morgan & Co. in 2001.

Following Chemical's merger with Manufacturers Hanover in 1994, Lee founded the bank's high yield (or junk bond) business, which was the bank's first public securities operation. At the same time, he built the bank's financial sponsor coverage business focused on private equity firms as well as the bank's mergers and acquisitions business.

By organizing high yield with loan syndications and private equity coverage, and the newly formed M&A group, this led to a variety of market innovations which Chase pioneered. Lee also led the team that resulted in Chase acquiring Hambrecht & Quist which gave the bank its first public equity business and first dedicated technology investment banking practice. He remained active in the technology industry.

In 2000, Lee was effectively demoted in favor of Geoffrey Boisi but within two years Boisi was out and Lee was again leading investment banking at JP Morgan. By 2007, Lee was placed at the center of a New York Times illustration title "Masters of the New Universe" where he was connected with some of the largest leveraged buyout transactions of the past decade.

Lee led the J.P. Morgan teams that executed the $25 billion Alibaba Group IPO, the largest IPO in history; the $23 billion General Motors IPO, the second largest U.S. IPO; and the $41 billion common stock sale of the U.S. Treasury’s ownership of AIG, resulting from the U.S. Government's bailout of the company. He also led the negotiations with the U.S. Treasury for the financial restructuring of Chrysler. Most recently, Lee also advised Comcast on their announced acquisition of Time Warner Cable and planned divestitures of systems to Charter (pending), the Dell Board of Directors Special Committee on the buyout of Dell by Michael Dell and Silver Lake, GE on its $30 billion sale of NBC to Comcast, United Airlines in its merger with Continental Airlines, News Corporation on its purchase of Dow Jones, was involved in the IPO of The Carlyle Group, and co-led the IPOs of Facebook and Twitter.

Lee was a member of Kappa Beta Phi.

In 2014, Lee testified in American International Group bailout litigation brought by AIG's shareholders seeking $40 billion based on claims that the Federal Reserve improperly sought 79.9% of the company's equity in exchange for a bailout in 2009.

== Death ==
Lee died on June 17, 2015, unexpectedly after experiencing shortness of breath while exercising. He is survived by his wife Beth and three children.
