= National Mentoring Month =

American youth mentoring campaign

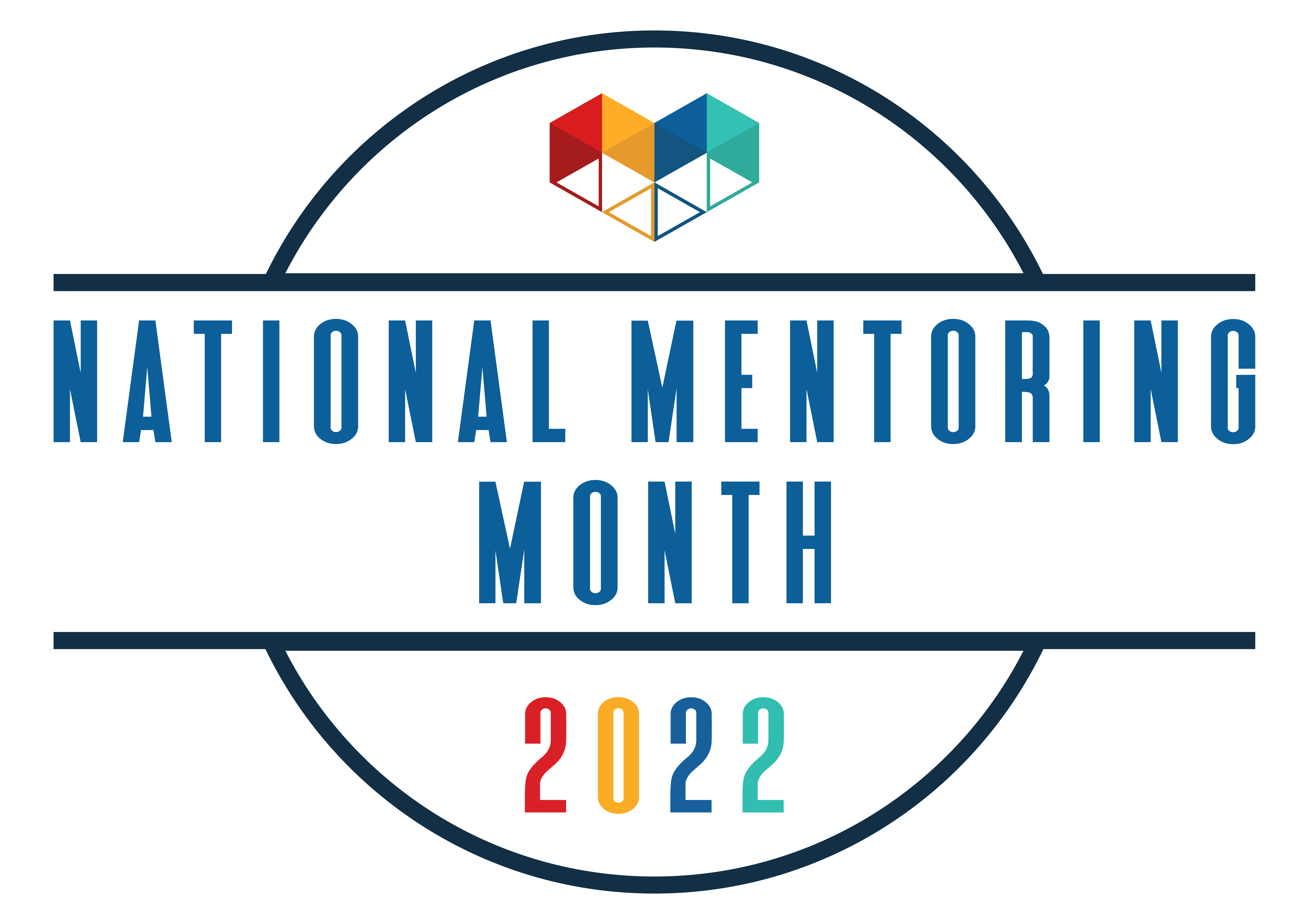
2022 National Mentoring Month Logo

National Mentoring Month is a campaign run throughout January by MENTOR and MENTOR Affiliates across the country. Launched in 2002, the campaign aims to unify and expand the mentoring movement, celebrate the power of relationships, and raise awareness around the importance of youth mentoring in the United States.

Supporters and participants of National Mentoring Month include prominent nonprofit organizations, elected officials from the local, state, and federal level, and several U.S. Presidents and their administrations.

There are a variety of ways for nonprofit organizations, corporations and businesses, elected officials, and individuals to get involved with National Mentoring Month and to drive positive change for young people.

1. Celebrate: Throughout January, there are several important dates to elevate and participate in. These include:
  1. I Am A Mentor Day
  2. International Mentoring Day
  3. Dr. MLK Day of Service
  4. Thank Your Mentor Day
2. Engage: There are many events, celebrations, and learning opportunities hosted throughout the month by local and national organizations. One of these is the National Mentoring Summit, an annual opportunity for the mentoring movement to come together, advance a collective mentoring agenda, strengthen programs and practices, and collaborate to support positive youth development through mentoring.
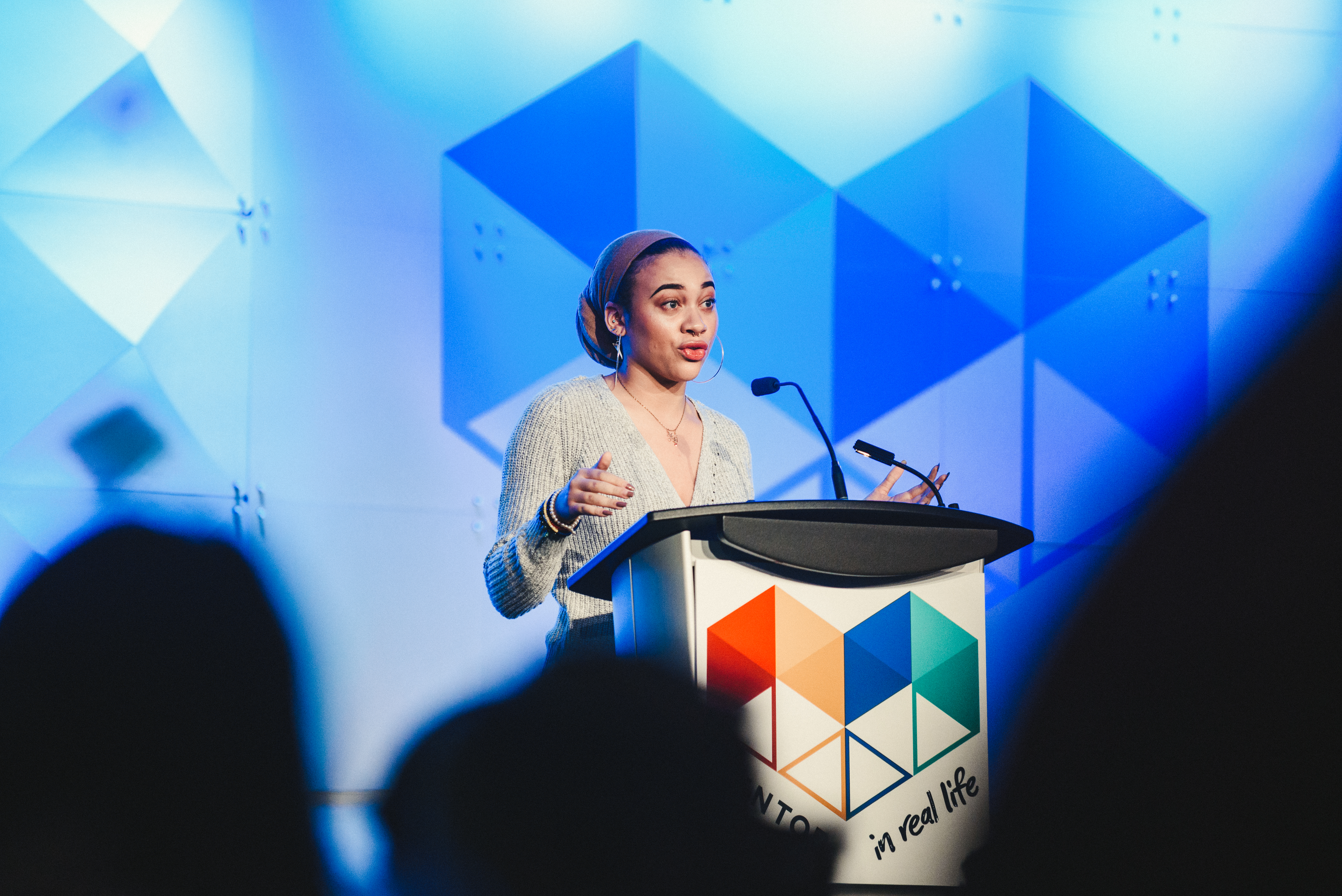
  Highlight from 2020 National Mentoring Summit
3. Elevate: For action steps you can take to create mentoring opportunities in your community, at your workplace, and across the country, check out the National Mentoring Month toolkits.
4. Join the Movement: Visit the Mentoring Connector, a free, national database of mentoring programs and begin exploring local mentoring opportunities today!

== See also ==
- Youth mentoring
- MENTOR
- StudentMentor.org
