= Lake Roland =

Lake Roland or Roland Lake may refer to:

- Lake Roland (Maryland), in the United States
  - Lake Roland (park), Maryland
- Roland Lake (Minnesota)
- Lake Roland (Ontario), in Canada
