= E-mentoring =

E-mentoring is a means of providing a guided mentoring relationship using online software or email. It allows participants to communicate at their own convenience and beyond time zones since it eliminates the need for them to be in the same physical location. Its programs are often developed to enhance morale, increase productivity, and promote career development.

== Background ==
The body of literature describes the main component of e-mentoring as the mentor and mentee. The first serves as the counselor, adviser, tutor, trainer and facilitator while the mentee, which is referred to as the learner, trainee, student, and tyro, among others, is the learner with less experience. He can be a student or a teacher or anyone who wants to be more sophisticated in terms of personal or professional growth. This type of mentoring relationship is said to be most successful when conducted during a transitional period on the life of the mentee (e.g. during an application to a university for admission, career decision-making).

== Early e-mentoring ==
E-mentoring stemmed from mentoring programs with the invention of the Internet, and began to gain popularity around 1993. First used for programs connecting schoolchildren with business people, e-mentoring is now popular throughout the US, the UK, and some parts of Europe.

Many early e-mentoring programs used email communication to link mentors and mentees. Telephone communication was also occasionally used, known as tele-mentoring. One of the first e-mentoring programs was developed in Canada in 1990, where teachers from schools in British Columbia were given online support and training by experienced peers. The teachers and peers never met in a face-to-face context.

== Web-based e-mentoring ==
Modern e-mentoring projects tend to rely on web-based solutions, particularly if children are involved. Online software allows both mentors and mentees to log into a secure online environment where they can converse under supervision of moderators and coordinators.

== E-mentoring technologies ==
E-mentoring can retain the face to face interaction by utilizing video chat services, such as FaceTime, Google Hangouts, Skype, Zoom, video chat through Facebook, etc. Web-based videoconferencing platforms can also be developed and customized according to the needs being catered by the e-mentoring system. It can be deployed as a one-on-one platform or a system that can be used by multiple users at the same. These are usually classified into three: Desktop/personal system; small group/midlevel; and, telepresence.

== Controversy and debate ==
Online mentoring is occasionally compared unfavorably with face to face mentoring. The medium limits the ability to pick up on visual or social cues, makes immediate feedback difficult, and can often be seen as impersonal.

== See also ==
- Youth mentoring
- Protégé
- Volunteering
- Virtual volunteering
