= Heekin Can =

American metal can manufacturer

Heekin Can, Inc. is a division of the Ball Corporation. It began as an independent company that grew to be one of the largest metal can manufacturers in the United States.

== History ==
=== Establishment and operation as a family business ===
Heekin Can was founded in Cincinnati, Ohio in 1901 by James Heekin (born December 8, 1843), proprietor of a business that sold food products, including coffee, tea, spices, extracts, and baking powder, packaged in tin cans. After his can supplier increased prices in 1900, Heekin began to make his own cans. The can-manufacturing operation soon evolved into the Heekin Can Company, which not only supplied the Heekin Spice Company, but also made cans for other businesses.

James Heekin died in 1904, and one of his 15 children, James J. Heekin, took over the business. Under his leadership the company began using lithography to add labeling and decoration to cans, and in the early 1900s it introduced the open-top cylinder can. Known as the "sanitary" or "packers" can, this new design was soon adopted as an industry standard. In 1915 a second manufacturing facility was added, due in part to increasing demand from customer R.J. Reynolds Company. The new plant was described at one time as the United States' "largest metal lithographing plant under one roof."

Heekin Can remained under family ownership and management until 1965. James J. Heekin retired in 1928, succeeded as company president by his brother Albert. Albert Heekin headed the business until 1948, when another brother, Daniel M. Heekin, assumed the presidency. Daniel, who had been president of the Can Manufacturers Institute during World War II, when manufacturers of consumer products faced widespread shortages of raw materials, oversaw a major expansion in the late 1940s and early 1950s, as Heekin added four new plants in Arkansas and Tennessee. Daniel Heekin was succeeded in 1954 by his nephew, Albert Heekin Jr., who was to be the last family member to serve as head of the company.

Under the leadership of Albert Heekin Jr., Heekin Can continued to expand its production capacity and pioneered several technical innovations. A modern production facility was built in Newtown, Ohio, including coating and decorating equipment, sheet-metal cutting equipment, aluminum beverage-can production lines (known as "draw-and-iron" lines), and lines for producing welded aerosol cans. Heekin invested heavily in research and development, and in 1959 patented a plastic embossing process that allowed it to create "virtually any texture" on a can, as well as adding plastic caps, closures, and other injection-molded items to metal packaging. In 1962 construction began on a manufacturing plant in Augusta, Wisconsin, serving Bush Brothers, a major customer. By 1964 Heekin operated eight production plants and had annual sales of about $30 million, making it the fifth-largest producer of metal containers in the United States.

=== Diamond International acquisition and leveraged buyouts ===
In 1965, Albert Heekin Jr., sold the family business to Diamond International in order to head off a possible hostile takeover. Diamond International acquired Heekin Can for more than $18 million. Initially Heekin was operated as a division of Diamond, but later it became a subsidiary. Under Diamond's ownership, the Heekin subsidiary diversified, adding polyethylene bottles and other containers to its product lines.

Diamond was acquired in a 1982 hostile takeover by corporate raider Sir James Goldsmith. Because Heekin was at the time one of the most valuable components of the Diamond conglomerate, it was quickly spun off to help finance Goldsmith's leveraged buyout. Wesray Holdings Corporation, headed by former U.S. Treasury Secretary William E. Simon, acquired Heekin through a complex leveraged buyout transaction in which almost all the purchase price of the company was obtained through Heekin's own cash reserves, loans and credit lines against Heekin's assets, and a sale-and-leaseback arrangement for Heekin's facilities. In his autobiography, Simon said that Wesray contributed only one million dollars to buy a company worth $82.9 million, while the International Directory of Company Histories reports Wesray's contribution as only $250,000 and the total purchase price as $108.8 million.

=== Public company ===
In 1985 Heekin went public for the first time with a $44-million public offering of 3.25 million shares of stock, allowing Wesray to divest most of its holdings and significantly reducing the company's debt from the 1982 buyout. According to Simon, Wesray realized a profit of $28 million from the sale of its Heekin holdings.

After going public, Heekin implemented a "back to basics" strategy in the late 1980s, returning to its historical emphasis on food cans by selling its aluminum can units to Reynolds Metals and increasing its research and development expenditures in the areas of food cans and plastic containers. At the same time, food producers that manufactured their own cans (as Heekin had done in its early years) were selling off their can production facilities in order to concentrate on food production, and Heekin acquired plants from Stokely USA, Quaker Oats Co., and Pittsburgh Metal Lithographing Co. Together with a new factory opened in 1987, these acquisitions helped to increase Heekin's production capacity by more than 20 percent. When labor unions at Newtown refused to accede to company demands for contract concessions, work was moved from Newtown to new facilities, reducing employment at Newtown from 720 to 380 in 1988. During the late 1980s, Heekin was profitable, recording annual sales increases from $207.5 million in 1986 to $336 million in 1989, and an increase of net annual income from $7 million to $13 million during the same period. It was well regarded for the quality of its management, and its stock price went from less than $14 per share in 1985 to $40 per share in 1990.

=== Ball acquisition ===
As of 1992 Heekin was deemed to be the largest regional manufacturer of metal food containers in the United States, with 11 manufacturing plants, located in Arkansas, Illinois, Indiana, Ohio, Pennsylvania, Tennessee, West Virginia, and Wisconsin. In that year, the company agreed to be acquired by Ball Corporation for an exchange of stock. Under the deal, Heekin stock was valued at $27 per share. The transaction was completed in 1993, helping to make Ball the third-largest manufacturer of food containers in North America. Heekin was merged into Ball's Metal Food Container and Specialty Products Group.
