= Roland Foods Corporation =

American Roland Food Corporation is a food product distributor in the New York metropolitan area. It is known for its food products and condiments. It is headquartered in Manhattan's Masonic Hall.

Roland's was purchased by Vestar Capital Partners in 2013.
