= Youth mentoring =

Youth mentoring is the process of matching mentors with young people who need or want a caring, responsible adult in their lives. Adult mentors are usually unrelated to the child or teen and work as volunteers through a community-, school-, or church-based social service program. The goal of youth mentoring programs is to improve the well-being of the child by providing a role model that can support the child academically, socially and/or personally. This goal can be accomplished through school work, communication, and/or activities. Goals and settings within a mentoring program vary by country because of cultural values.

Although informal mentoring relationships exist, formal, high-quality mentoring matches made through local or state mentoring organizations are often the most effective.

According to The Encyclopedia of Informal Education:

"The classic definition of mentoring is of an older experienced guide who is acceptable to the young person and who can help ease the transition to adulthood by a mix of support and challenge. In this sense it is a developmental relationship in which the young person is inducted into the world of adulthood."

== Mentoring effects ==
=== Research ===
Much research has been conducted on youth mentoring with the intent of determining whether or not there are positive benefits for youth and, if so, under what conditions the positive effects are most likely to occur. The evidence is somewhat mixed, however, and studies caution against overestimating the potential effects due to the small overall magnitude of association. According to some studies, not all mentoring programs are found to have positive effects. In some cases, youth involved in mentoring relationships of short duration or infrequent interactions with their mentors experienced no benefits or were harmed in the form of lower self-esteem. Even studies that demonstrated positive outcomes for youth suggested that benefits from mentoring do not always last for an extended period of time after the intervention has ended.

=== Meta-analysis ===
One method of determining how effective mentoring relationships have become is with the use of meta-analysis. Meta-analysis allows a researcher to synthesize several studies and has been said to provide an unbiased, objective, and quantifiable method to test for significant differences in the results found across studies. Two studies using this method are presented below.

In a meta-analysis of 55 studies on mentoring programs, the overall effectiveness of mentoring as well as the factors relating to variation in mentoring effects were studied. In this study, articles found on popular databases as well as possible search engines (such as Yahoo, etc.) that were published between 1970 and 1998 were selected and evaluated. Findings from this meta-analysis indicated that there was an overall positive, though modest, effect from mentoring. The effect appeared to be especially beneficial for youth classified as "at risk" (see at-risk students) or "disadvantaged". Within this context, such student populations included youth in foster care, academically underachieving youth, youth with incarcerated guardians, youth involved in the juvenile justice system, disabled youth, and youth with children. Further findings indicated that effect size may be increased with the use of specific strategies and practices, such as providing continual support and structure to the mentor and relationship. That this study cannot imply causality and further research is recommended to explore this relationship.

In another meta-analysis, 39 articles published between 1970 and 2005 were analyzed. Articles were required to measure a quantifiable effect on either delinquency, aggression, substance use, or academic achievement. The overall effects were found to be positive with delinquency as well as with the other outcomes studied. Effects were stronger with the delinquent and aggressive outcomes, while still remaining moderate with the group measuring substance use and academic achievement. This suggests that mentoring programs are especially effective with delinquent behavior.

=== Best practices ===
Research indicates that the use of specific best practices can be used to improve the mentoring experience.

In the meta-analysis listed above, several best practices were found to increase effect sizes in mentoring programs:

1. Monitoring of program implementation
2. Screening of prospective mentors
3. Matching of mentors and youth on the basis of one or more relevant criteria
4. Both pre-match and ongoing training
5. Supervision for mentor
6. Support group for mentors
7. Structured activities for mentors and youth
8. Parent support or involvement components
9. Expectations for both frequency of contact and length of relationship
10. Mentor background in a helping role

In addition, there are several mentor websites that suggest the inclusion of similar best practices with the hopes of created greater outcomes for youth.

=== Informal vs. formal mentoring ===
In the research, there is a distinction between a naturally occurring adult-youth relationship (referred to as informal mentoring) and a structured adult-youth relationship where the mentor is assigned or matched (referred to as formal mentoring). There is less research available for informal mentor relationships than there is for formal, but the research indicates that benefits exist for both the mentor and mentee. Research is also available that suggests no effect or negative effects from mentoring, especially if the relationship with the adult fails. Formal mentoring has been better studied in the research and, therefore, more findings are available on this topic. In a review of literature, it was suggested that an emphasis in quality of mentoring relationship and programming has been steadily increasing in the research and a shift in outcome measures is apparent, with most studies measuring general youth development as opposed to reductions in particular deviant behaviors. In another review of literature, 10 studies were analyzed and found a moderate positive effect on mentee grades, reduction of substance use, reduction of some delinquent behaviors, but not with youth self-esteem.

These studies suggest that, although research is conflicting, there is typically an overall positive effect as a result of a mentoring relationship. This positive effect is more likely with the use of established best practices and within the population of youth classified as delinquent or "at risk". Quantitative analysis shows that academic-based mentoring has stronger associations with outcomes than does general youth mentoring. Most research agrees, however, that further research is necessary and that research with more rigorous methods would be beneficial to the field.

=== Benefits ===
Literature that looks at the effects of cross-age peer mentoring suggests that while these programs may not always be effective, they have been correlated with "improvements on academic self-esteem and connectedness." Published literature also indicates that "formal community-based youth mentoring relationships" allow for successful intervention with children in difficult or at-risk environments. Mentoring programs for youth are mentioned as having significant benefits such as lower dropout rates in high school and subsequently increased graduation rates, along with an increase of enrollment into and graduation from institutions of higher education. On a day to day basis, youth participating in mentoring relationships demonstrate better attendance with fewer unexcused absences. Students adopt a more positive attitude towards formal classroom learning with more formidable relationships between students, teachers, and parents. Youths also acquire more self-confidence and better behavior at home and school. In turn, this improves their motivation to learn in a given subject area.

Youth mentoring draws on positive theories of "development-clinical psychology." These theories see the value of relationships characterized by communication, support, and trust, which shapes the character development of children. For teachers, mentoring means enhanced skills in supervision and better patience, sense of fulfillment, and increased self-esteem. Successful mentorships promote positive health through the improvement of academic education, positive self-worth, and social acceptance. Likewise, mentorships can decrease high-risk violent behaviors, usage of alcohol, tobacco, and drugs.

There are debates about the effectiveness of youth-mentoring as some claim that child development is influenced by interactions that extend beyond these relationships. Mentoring alone is not sufficient; positive development requires more than a cross-age mentor. The goals of youth mentoring, however, can be simply to turn obstacles into opportunities, and to provide a safe and structured space for children to discover themselves as they develop.

== Approaches to mentoring ==
=== School-based ===
One prevalent method is referred to as the "School-Based" approach. Oftentimes, teachers refer students to participate in a mentoring relationship due to behavioral problems or difficulties with schoolwork. The mentor meets with the youth in an academic setting and facilitates school work while acting as a supportive role-model.They may also play games, do crafts or partake in non-academic activities. This approach is practiced by organizations such as Big Brothers Big Sisters which is located in eleven countries including Ireland, the United States, Israel, and Bulgaria. As of 2005, there was an estimated 870,000 adults mentoring youth in a school-based program throughout The United States alone. An estimated 70% of all formal mentoring programs in the United States are categorized as school-based. Canada has developed an in-school program in which elderly Aboriginal mentors are paired with both Aboriginal and non-Aboriginal children to raise self-esteem, teach about native cultures, and provide support to youth in school.

Statistics prove that school-based mentoring will increase academic student involvement. The school-based approach revealed improvement in the classroom and socially. Mentors are matched with a student and they work one on one with the student throughout the school year. Focusing on schoolwork, the student's interest, and other activities. As a mentor the expectation is to be a positive role model that is supportive and encouraging. This relationship will help motivate the student to be successful in school, reducing school infractions and truancy.

=== Community-based ===
"Community Based" is another approach to mentoring. In this setting, a mentor meets youth in the community such as at a church, community facility, or by taking the child to community events. Individual vs. community based mentoring may be culturally specific, such as in India where youth are less in need of individual attention and thrive in a group setting, according to The International Journal of Social Work. Both approaches can be done in a one-on-one or group setting between mentee youth and paraprofessional mentors.

Paraprofessionals are non-parent adult mentors who are recruited or volunteer to execute certain tasks after being guided and supervised by a professional service provider. Although the many community-based programs that exist today vary in design and delivery, the majority target skill sets relating to social integration, self-sufficiency, and academic competence. Community engagement statistics states that mentees after mentoring programs are 55% more likely to enroll in college, 78% more likely to volunteer regularly, 90% are interested in becoming a mentor, and 130% more likely to hold leadership positions.

A survey questioning 1,101 mentors through 98 mentoring programs found that school-based mentoring programs had fewer contact hours than community-based mentoring programs. Community-based mentors also self-reported to be "very close" to their mentees, while school-based mentors reported to be "close". This survey used nine factors to benchmark the developing relationships. These factors are "(1) engaging in social activities; (2) engaging in academic activities; (3) number of hours per month spent together; (4) decision-making shared by mentor and mentee; (5) prematch training; (6) postmatch training; (7) mentor screening (only important relationship development in community-based programs); (8) matching; and (9) age of the mentee." The conclusion of this study is that school-based programs are a good compliment to community based mentoring programs, meaning that schools should strive to have a variety of mentoring programs to give students the best resources that fit to their needs.

Youth mentoring also addresses the issue of workforce shortages since it uses paraprofessionals for child services where the need is high but the resources are limited. Beginning in 2019, a new form of training—Just-In-Time Training—was proposed to help address shortages in child services. These strategies are proposed to even work "within the context of dynamic mental health services," as they allow for services, normally directed towards professionals, to be executed just as efficiently by individuals with less official qualifications.

=== Individual ===
Individual mentoring, or a one on one setting is where there is one mentor who repeatedly meets with the same mentee for the duration of their program. These partnerships can be found in both community and school-based programs. One on one mentoring is seen in programs such as Big Brothers, Big Sisters in The United States, as well as Mentor Me India in India. This mentoring style is regarded as one of the most widespread social interventions in the U.S., with an estimated 3 million youth were in formal one on one mentoring relationships. The traditional model is structured so that mentors and youth are paired through a formal mechanism and pairings are free to spend time together in a range of different activities and settings as to help build their relationship with one another. Individual mentor relationships or mixed with some group meetings were found to be more effective than solely group mentoring, found in a study in The New Zealand Journal of Psychology.

The most effective and successful mentoring relationships are defined by the development of trust between the mentor and the student. Studies examining such relationships show that trust is the most critical factor in determining whether the relationship will be perceived as satisfying by both parties. To build trust in a one-on-one setting, the approach of the mentor is key. Mentors who prioritize relationship or friendship building tend to be more effective than those who focus largely on goals and reforming their students. Effective mentors are likely to be characterized by having a consistent presence in their mentees' lives, respect for their mentees' viewpoints, greater attention for their mentees' desires or goals, and accountability for maintaining good relations. Less effective mentors typically do not meet with their mentees regularly, attempt to reform or transform their mentees, and overemphasize behavioral or academic changes.

The progress of mentees is enhanced when mentors place attention to cultural, sporting, and extra-curricular actives, not only to academics. Working on these factors of a student's life can improve their self-esteem, mental health, and create new relationships, and this in turn helps the students transition out of mentorships and in to higher academics. Mentees are usually overlooked and their potential can be accidentally neglected by inexperienced mentors. This is why professional mentors can offer the best mentorship for mentees to get the best out of tutoring sessions. However, mentoring is the most successful when mentoring is built on the shared enthusiasm between mentors and mentees.

=== Group ===
Small group mentoring can be beneficial in places where there is a shortage of mentors, or youth are able to learn collectively in a group setting. This works with career oriented mentoring, when the focus is to encourage future success of the individual by bringing in successful professionals as mentors. This has found to be a successful approach in The Roma Mentor Project throughout Europe; it is able to build self-confidence, and social skills while also teaching the importance of Romani culture.

=== Gender matching ===
Research shows that youth mentorship relationships have the highest impact for "at-risk students" or "disadvantaged" students. Mentoring has shown to have great academic gains for these populations that have higher risk of school failure and dropping out. Although there have been many studies that look at the impact of mentorship and the importance of the length of the mentorship relationship, there has not been many studies that look at the impact of gender in a mentoring relationship. About one third of female mentees' mentorship was terminated earlier than males. The termination occurred before eleven months; by twelve months an estimated 46% females had terminated their mentorship. On the other hand, males had an average of two years of mentorship. The research that has been done on gender matching in mentoring relationships has resulted in conflicting findings. For example, in a dissertation study the researcher looked at the impact that a male role model may have on "successful" African American middle school males. The study found that the gender of the role model is not the most important factor, the most important factor was that the role model is someone that has certain qualities such as leadership, accomplishments, work ethic, and creates a caring environment. On the other hand, another study looked at the differences between the mentoring relationships that men and women mentors have with their mentees and found that men and women mentor differently. They found that women mentors give more psychosocial mentoring, where as male mentors give more career mentoring. Yet another study found that natural male mentors had a significant impact on African American youth in regards to their future economic benefits. The study found that African American fatherless youth benefited the most when they had a male mentor compared to a female mentor or no mentor at all. Because of these conflicting findings on the impact of gender matching in mentorship relationships, further research needs to be done on this topic.

== Mentoring programs by country ==
Youth mentoring takes place around the world, and countries take varying approaches to the concept based on values and needs of that country's youth. There are organizations such as Big Brothers Big Sisters International that have locations worldwide, as well as country specific organizations, such as Mentor Me India.

=== Australia ===
Australia has a large number of mentoring program operating across the country using a number of mentoring practices – in school mentoring, one on one mentoring, e-mentoring are some common example. Australia also has a peak body representing the youth mentoring sector known as the Australian Youth Mentoring Network – or the AYMN. The AYMN works with interested youth mentoring organisations and practitioners to foster the growth and development of high quality mentoring programs for young people in Australia by providing a national base of collaboration, support, guidance and expertise. It has played a major role in building stronger mentoring practice, and performance in the field. One of the Network's key achievements includes the creation of the National Youth Mentoring Benchmarks, where over 500 individuals from the mentoring sector contributed to the consultation process and the final product.

=== Hungary ===
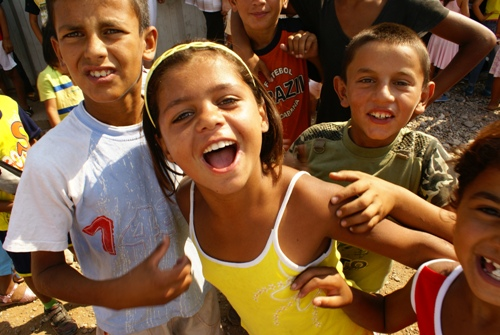
Romani Children

The Romani population is about 1.9% of the total population in Hungary, according to the 2001 census. There are 12 Million Romani across Europe, and they account for one of Europe's most vulnerable populations. Within the Romani population, there is a lack of education among youth accompanied by large numbers of illiteracy. Because of this trend, there was the creation of The Roma Mentor Project, which provides successful Romani adults to be role models of Romani youth. The program started in 2006, and by 2011, it spread to four other European countries with 1,400 participants. The program matches professionals in many different fields, such as government officials, professors, musicians, and media figures. These adults meets with groups of youth for two to three hours, twice a month, to influence their future decisions on education and career development. Already the program has found a shift in attitudes toward education and improvement in grades.

=== India ===
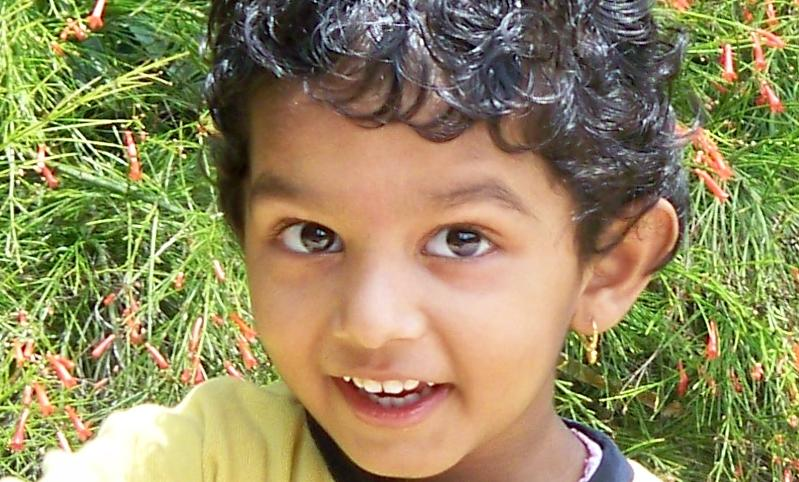
Smiling Indian Boy

Mentoring programs in the south of India have begun to rise in rural settings. Mentoring in India can be found in both a one-to-one setting as well as group settings. Mentor Me India is a specific program within urban India and is a program that executes one-to-one mentoring within the community. These mentorships have a focus on girls for aged 10 to 12 for the pilot phase, providing them female professional mentors. Another mentoring program that is starting in rural India implemented by United States researches as well as Indian community members. The purpose was to help with the impoverished youth who do not have access to the same resources as youth in an urban setting. When creating the program, Indian cultural norms and limited resource access were taken into account. The focus of this mentorship program is to develop leadership, academic achievement, and spiritual development while having a community service portion among the youth. According to The Journal of International Social Work, one-on-one mentorships are not as fitting in rural India as they be elsewhere due to a lack of mentors as well as the desire to building peer relationships.

=== South Africa ===
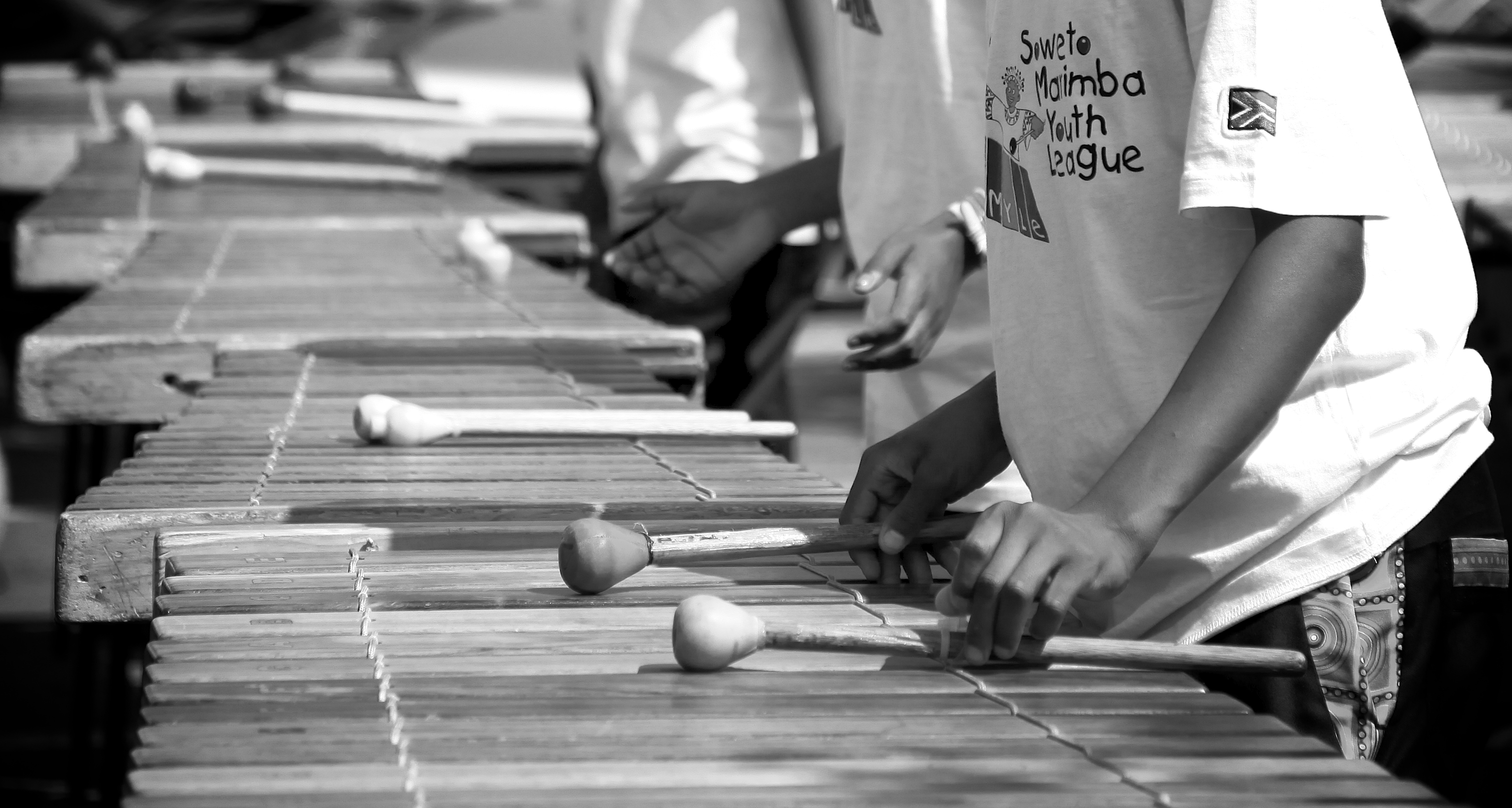
South African youth playing the marimba

Starting in the 1990s, after high rates of youth incarceration due to apartheid, non-governmental agencies decided there was need to advocate for the youth. The purpose of these organizations is to have an alternative to the formal justice setting, which kept around 30,000 youth per year out of criminal trial. One of the programs, Diversion into Music Education (DIME), has incorporated a mentor base approach through music appreciation. The program does not require any previous music capabilities and focuses on the student, not on the performance. The program is also located in Tampa, Florida, United States and allows for an intercultural exchange of staff members and video between organizations. The mentor's role in this organization is to help youth set and achieve goals and assist in personal growth of the individual. Results from the program have shown positive outcomes on family relationships.

=== United States ===
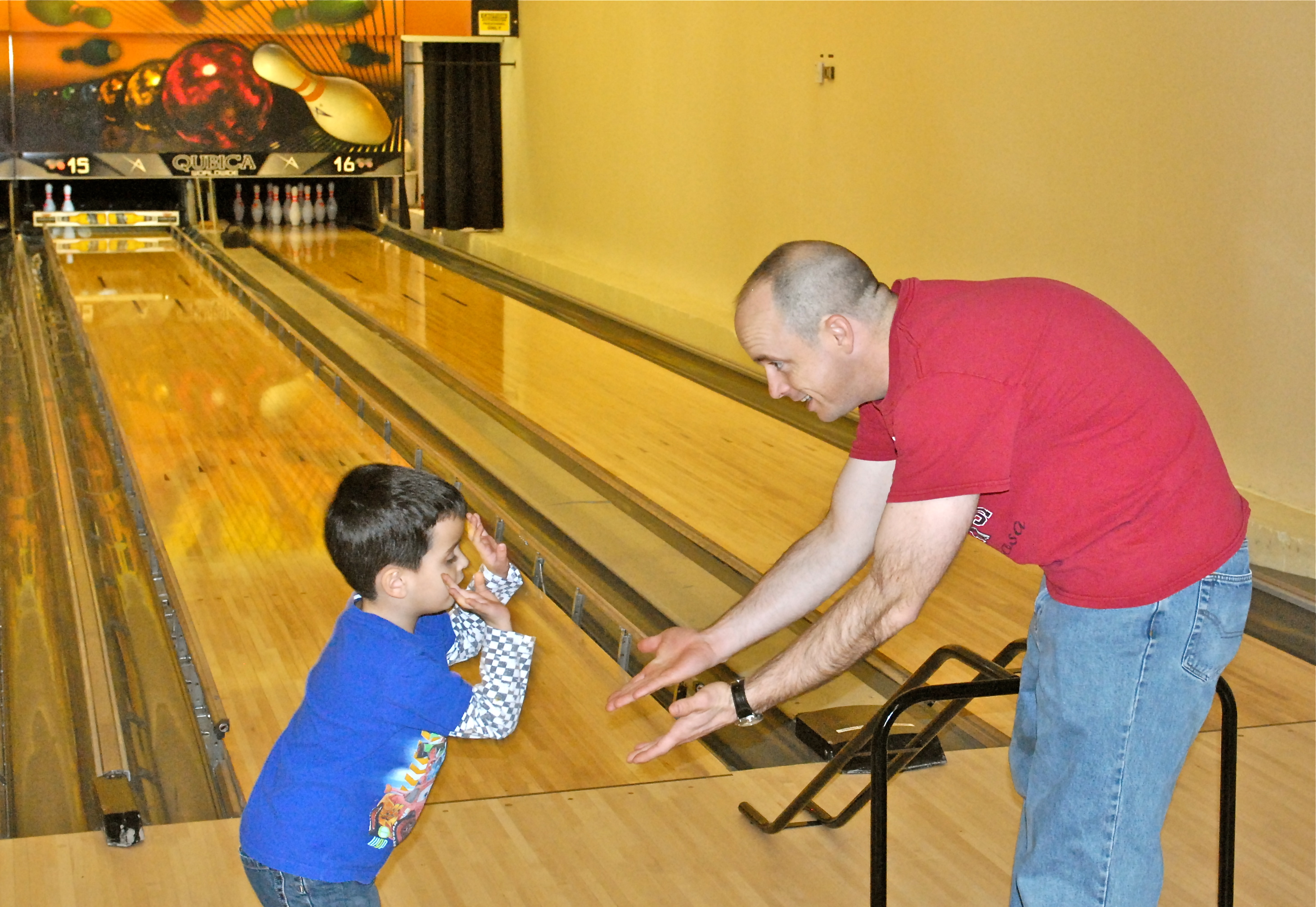
Man and boy high-fiving at a bowling alley

The largest mentoring program in the United States is Big Brothers Big Sisters of America, a program for youth from ages 6–18. The organization implements both community-based as well as school-based mentoring, and is typically a one-on-one mentorship. There are also programs that are for specific groups of youth such as The National CARES Mentoring Movement, which was created in the aftermath of Hurricane Katrina. The program provides strong black leaders to empower black youth in America for a better future. At the start of the program, 86 percent of black fourth graders were reading below grade level, and 1,000 black children a day were being arrested. After joining the mentoring movement, 98 percent of participants stayed in school as well as avoided gang activity, and teen pregnancy, while 85 percent of youth in the program did not use drugs. Since starting in 2005, the program has influenced over 125,000 black youths. The mentoring typically takes place in the community in a group setting to create positive relations among the youth. In 2002, the Institute of Medicine of the National Academy of Sciences published a major report examining after-school and other community programs designed to foster positive youth development. The report concluded that very few after-school programs "have received the kind of comprehensive experimental evaluation necessary to make a firm recommendation about replicating the program in its entirety across the country." However, the report singled out mentoring programs modeled after the Big Brothers Big Sisters mentoring program as a rare exception, and recommended its widespread replication.

=== Nigeria ===
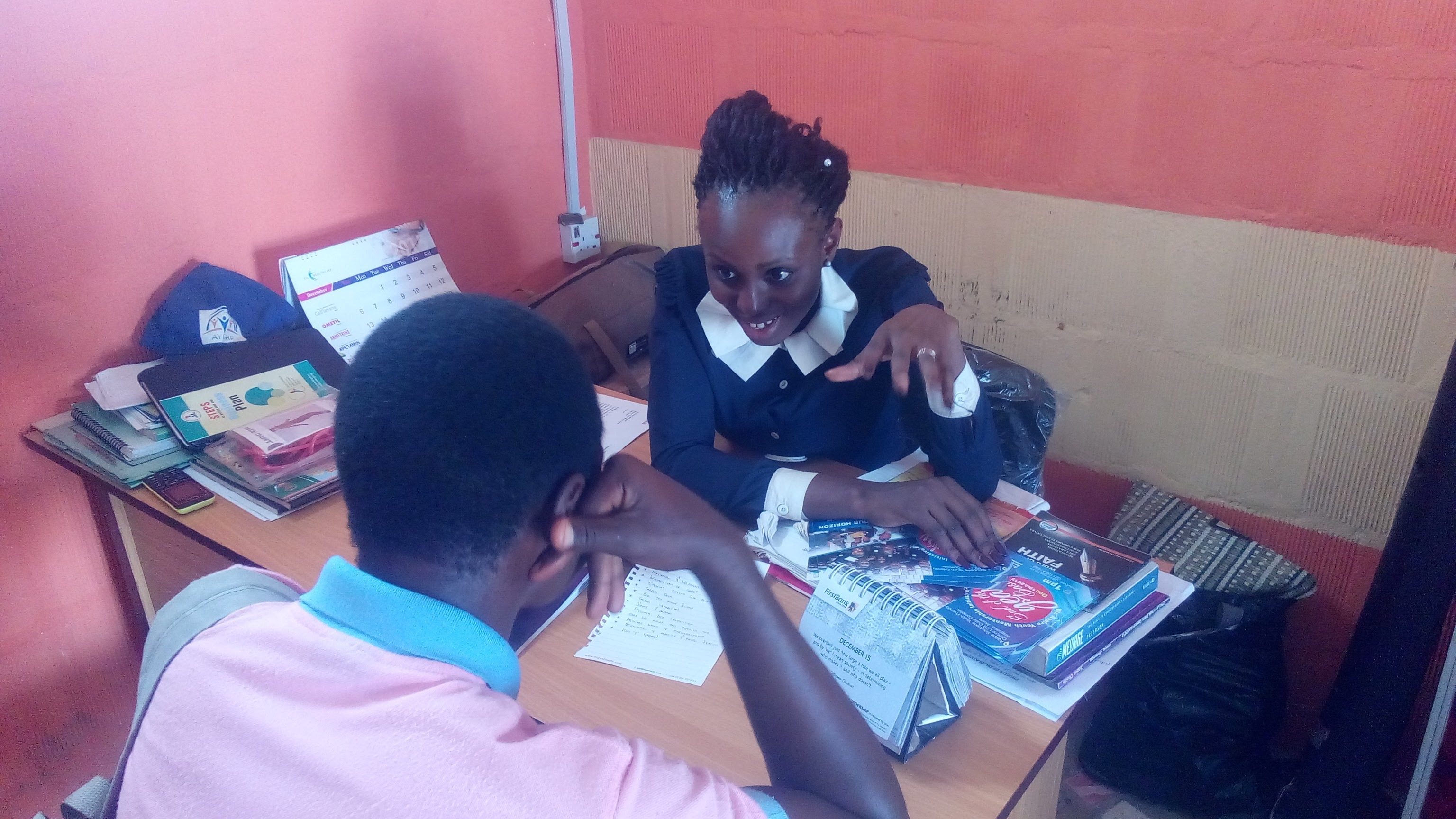
Female Mentor in Nigeria- Encouraging peer-based counseling

As with mentoring everywhere, informal mentoring predates the formal style of mentoring in Nigeria. Informal mentoring is how youths are educated and family traditions, instructions and rituals were passed through generations. However the formal mentoring in Nigeria is seen in various sectors including the academia, business as well as others. Nigerian youth are widely known for their entrepreneurial skills. More than 80% of them, irrespective of gender, are said to have the potential entrepreneurial mentoring as a way of investing in their future. Although informal mentoring has been the original form of most mentoring relationships, formal mentoring in exist in academia, but with a largely male predominance thereby causing a skewed dyad that require training and improvement of the formal training structures available. Barriers to mentoring includes lack of funding, lack of trust, as well as lack of appropriate gender based mentoring especially for young women in mentoring. This is not an exhaustive list, as there is a call for the development of more research into youth mentoring in the Nigerian context. Also, the May 31st 2018 "Not Too Young to Run" Bill signed to law by President Muhammadu Buhari encourages youth participation in political leadership roles. Several community efforts by non-governmental agencies such as the Toni Elumelu Foundation, the Konectin Mentorship Program (KOMP), Strategy for Mentoring Initiative and Leadership Empowerment (S.M.I.L.E) in Lagos as well as We Aspire Youth Mentorship Initiative, a youth based group centered around encouraging males and females alike to engage in peer-based mentoring.

=== Youth Mentoring in Africa ===
Youth mentoring in Africa has its roots in traditional community practices where elders guided the younger generation. Africa's professional and vocational development is culturally dependent on mentorship and apprenticeship, elders provided wisdom, guidance, knowledge, and skills essential for personal development and community continuity. This informal mentoring was integral in teaching cultural values, social norms, and survival skills.

The transition from these traditional practices to more formalized mentoring programs began in the late 20th century. This shift was driven by the increasing urbanization and modernization of African societies, which disrupted traditional community structures. The need for structured support systems became more apparent, especially in urban areas where young people faced different challenges than in rural settings.

In the late 20th and early 21st centuries, several factors contributed to the growth of formal youth mentoring programs:

- Educational Reforms: Many African countries began to recognize the importance of mentoring in educational success, leading to the integration of mentoring programs within schools and universities.
- Economic Challenges: High unemployment rates and economic instability in many African countries highlighted the need for mentoring programs to help young people navigate the job market.
- International influence: Global organizations and foreign governments started to support and fund mentoring initiatives as part of broader development programs.
- Technological advancements: The rise of digital technology enabled the creation of virtual mentoring platforms, expanding the reach and accessibility of mentoring programs across the continent.

==== Growth ====
Youth mentoring in Africa has significantly expanded in recent decades. Supported by local and international organizations, these programs aim to address educational, social, and economic challenges by providing guidance and opportunities for young people.

==== Examples of Programs ====
1. African Leadership Academy (ALA): Pairs students with professionals for career guidance and personal development.
2. Tech Women: An initiative by the U.S. Department of State, mentoring women leaders in STEM from Africa and other regions.
3. Junior Achievement Africa (JA Africa): Connects students with business leaders to mentor them in entrepreneurship and work readiness.
4. African Youth Mentorship Network (AYMN): Connects young Africans with mentors from various industries to help them achieve their goals.
5. Tony Elumelu Foundation: Provides mentorship to aspiring entrepreneurs through its Entrepreneurship Program
6. Konectin Mentorship Program (KOMP): Aims to bridge the network and experience gap for young professionals in Africa by connecting them with industry professionals for guidance and support.
- Youth club
- Peer mentoring
- Tutor
- StudentMentor.org
- MENTOR
- National Mentoring Month
