= Mentorship =

Guidance relationship

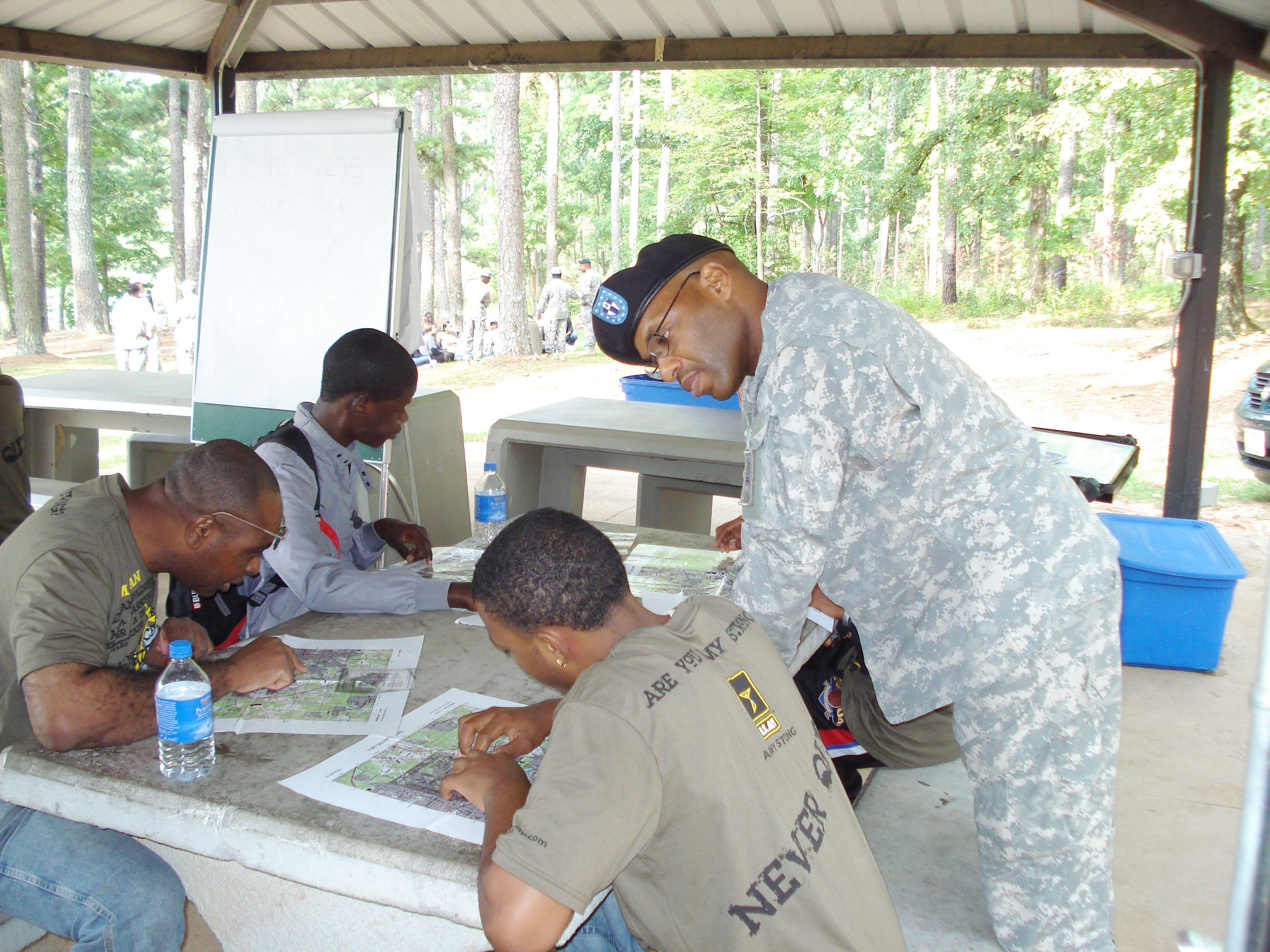
An army trainer mentors new soldiers.

Mentorship is the patronage, influence, guidance, or direction given by a mentor. A mentor is someone who teaches or gives help and advice to a less experienced and often younger person. In an organizational setting, a mentor influences the personal and professional growth of a mentee. Most traditional mentorships involve having senior employees mentor more junior employees, but mentors do not necessarily have to be more senior than the people they mentor. What matters is that mentors have experience that others can learn from.

According to the Business Dictionary, a mentor is a senior or more experienced person who is assigned to function as an advisor, counsellor, or guide to a junior or trainee. The mentor is responsible for offering help and feedback to the person under their supervision. A mentor's role, according to this definition, is to use their experience to help a junior employee by supporting them in their work and career, providing comments on their work, and, most crucially, offering direction to mentees as they work through problems and circumstances at work.

Interaction with an expert may also be necessary to gain proficiency with cultural tools. Mentorship experience and relationship structure affect the "amount of psychosocial support, career guidance, role modeling, and communication that occurs in the mentoring relationships in which the protégés and mentors engaged".

The person receiving mentorship may be referred to as a protégé (male), a protégée (female), an apprentice, a learner or, in the 2000s, a mentee. Mentoring is a process that always involves communication and is relationship-based, but its precise definition is elusive, with more than 50 definitions currently in use, such as:

Mentoring is a process for the informal transmission of knowledge, social capital, and the psychosocial support perceived by the recipient as relevant to work, career, or professional development; mentoring entails informal communication, usually face-to-face and during a sustained period of time, between a person who is perceived to have greater relevant knowledge, wisdom, or experience (the mentor) and a person who is perceived to have less (the protégé).

Mentoring in Europe has existed as early as Ancient Greece. The word's origin comes from Mentor, son of Alcimus in Homer's Odyssey. Since the 1970s it has spread in the United States mainly in training contexts, associated with important historical links to the movement advancing workplace equity for women and minorities and has been described as "an innovation in American management".

== History ==
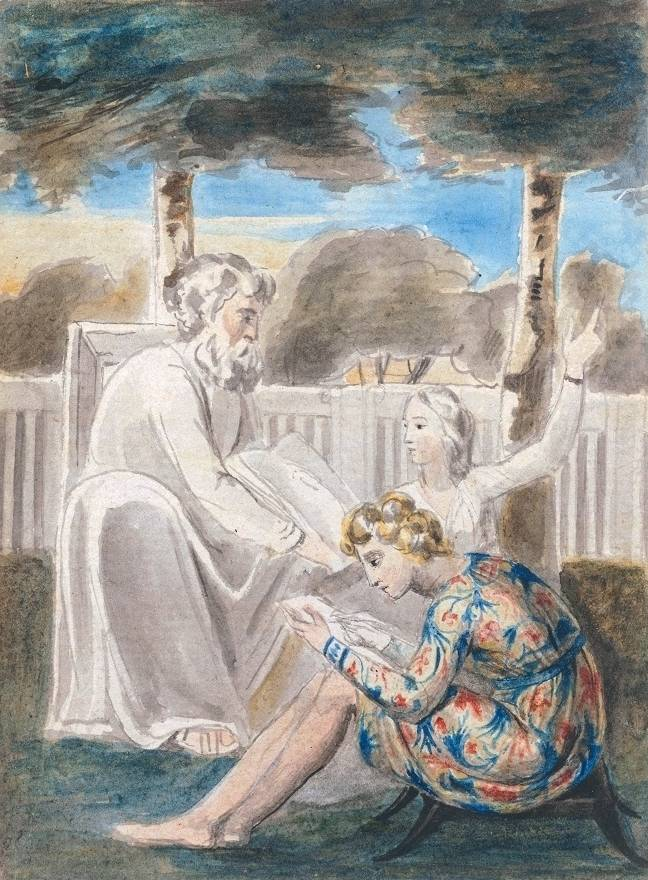
William Blake's "Age Teaching Youth", a Romantic image of mentorship

The word was inspired by the character Mentor in Homer's Odyssey. Although the Mentor in the story is portrayed as a somewhat ineffective old man, the goddess Athena assumes his appearance to guide young Telemachus in his time of difficulty.

Historically significant systems of mentorship include the guru–disciple tradition practiced in Hinduism and Buddhism, Elders, the discipleship system practiced by Rabbinical Judaism and the Christian church and apprenticeship under the medieval guild system.

In the United States, advocates for workplace equity in the second half of the twentieth century popularized the term "mentor" and the concept of career mentorship as part of a larger social capital lexicon that also includes terms such as glass ceiling, bamboo ceiling, networking, role model, and gatekeeper, which serves to identify and address the problems barring non-dominant groups from professional success. Mainstream business literature has adopted the terms and concepts and promoted them as pathways to success for all career climbers. These terms were not in the general American vocabulary until the mid-1990s.

== Professional bodies and qualifications ==
The European Mentoring and Coaching Council (EMCC) is the leading global body in terms of creating and maintaining a range of industry-standard frameworks, rules and processes for mentorship and related supervision and coaching fields.

== Techniques ==
As the focus of mentorship is to develop the whole person, the techniques used are broad and require wisdom to be appropriately used. A 1995 study of mentoring techniques most commonly used in business found that the five most commonly used techniques among mentors were:

1. Accompanying: the mentor participates in the learning process alongside the learner and supports them.
2. Sowing: the mentor gives initially unclear or unacceptable advice to the learner that has value in a given situation.
3. Catalyzing: the mentor chooses to plunge the learner right into change to provoke a different way of thinking, a change in identity or a re-ordering of values.
4. Showing: the mentor teaches the learner by demonstrating a skill or activity.
5. Harvesting: the mentor assesses and defines the utility and value of the learner's skills.

Different techniques may be used by mentors according to the situation and the mindset of the mentee. The techniques used in modern organizations can be found in ancient education systems, from the Socratic technique of harvesting to the accompaniment used in the apprenticeship of itinerant cathedral builders during the Middle Ages. Leadership authors Jim Kouzes and Barry Z. Posner advise mentors to look for "teachable moments" in order to "expand or realize the potentialities of the people in the organizations they lead" and underline that personal credibility is as essential to quality mentoring as skill.

There are different types of mentors, such as:

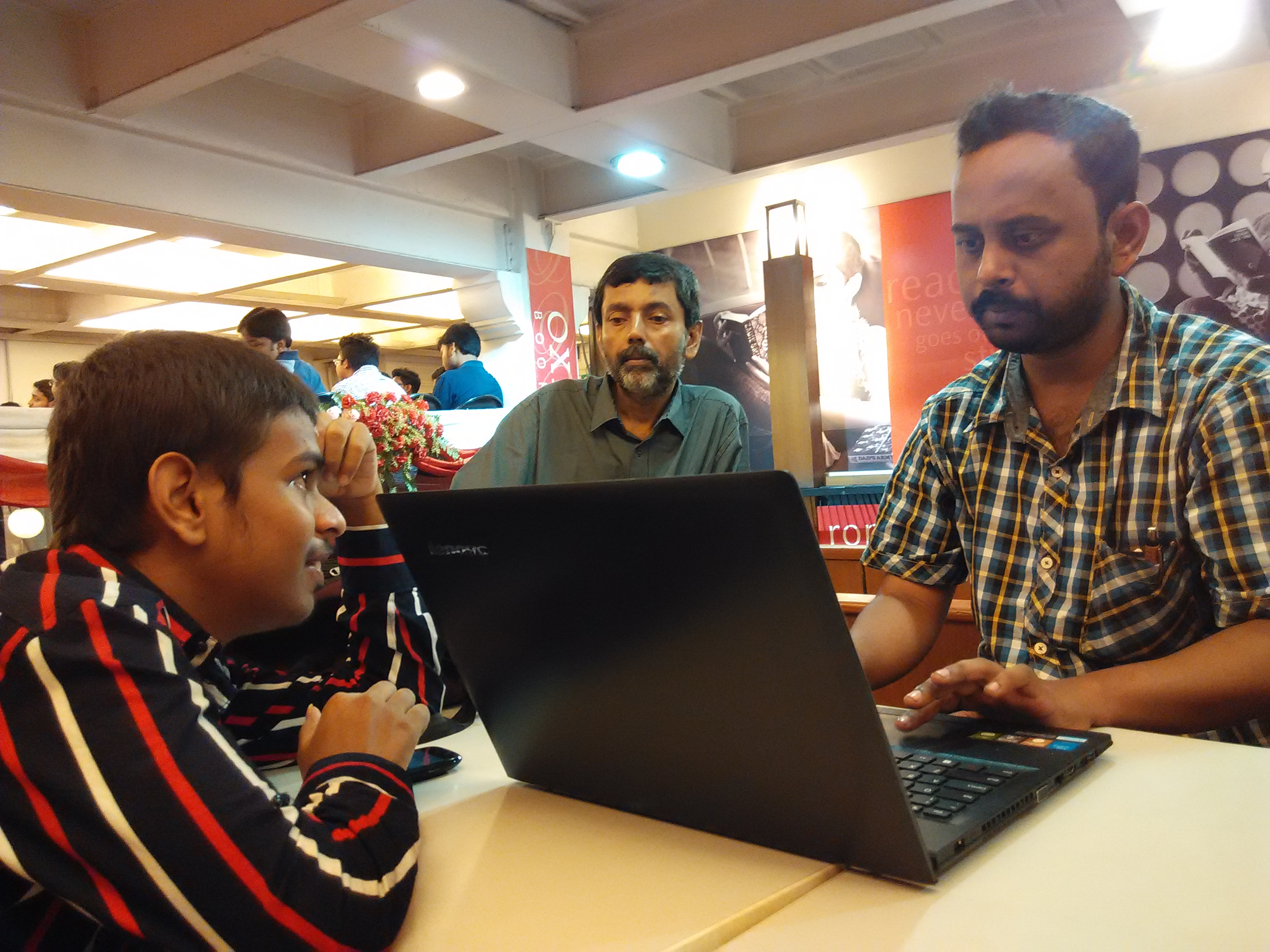
A senior editor mentors a junior editor.

- Multiple mentors: A new trend is for a learner to have multiple mentors. Having more than one mentor can expand the learner's knowledge, as different mentors may have different strengths.
- Profession or trade mentor: This is someone who is currently in the trade or profession the learner is entering. They know the trends, important changes, and new practices that newcomers should know to stay at the top of their careers. A mentor like this would be someone a learner can discuss ideas with and also provides the learner with the opportunity to network with other individuals in the trade or profession.
- Industry mentor: This is someone who does not only focus on the profession and can give insight into the industry as a whole, such as research, development, or key changes.
- Organization mentor: Politics in organizations are constantly changing. It is important to be knowledgeable about the values, strategies, and products that are within the organisation, and when they change. An organization mentor can give clarity when needed, for example, on missions and strategies.
- Work process mentor: This mentor can cut through unnecessary work, explain the "ins and outs" of projects and day-to-day tasks, and eliminate unnecessary things in the learner's workday. This mentor can help finish tasks quickly and efficiently.
- Technology mentor: Technology has been rapidly improving and becoming more a part of day-to-day transactions within companies. A technology mentor can help with technical breakdowns, advise on systems that may work better than what the learner is currently using, and coach them in using new technology.

== Types of mentoring ==
=== Formal mentoring ===
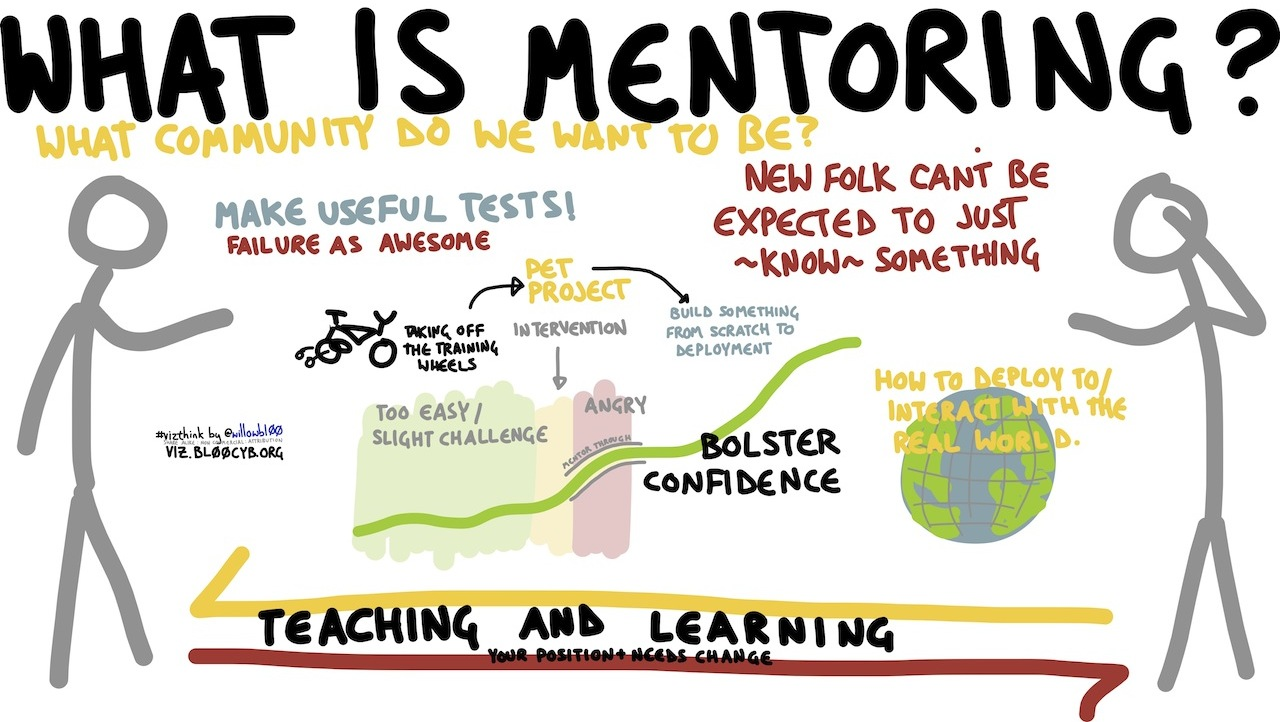
Some elements of mentoring

Formal mentoring relationships are set up by an administrative unit or office in a company or organization, which solicits and recruits qualified individuals who are willing to mentor, provides training to the mentors, and helps to match the mentors with a person in need of mentoring. While formal mentoring systems contain numerous structural and guidance elements, they usually allow the mentor and mentee to have an active role in choosing who they want to work with. Formal mentoring programs that simply assign mentors to mentees without allowing input from these individuals have not performed well. Even though a mentor and a mentee may seem perfectly matched "on paper", in practice, they may have different working or learning styles. As such, giving the mentor and the mentee the opportunity to help select who they want to work with is a widely used approach. For example, youth mentoring programs assign at-risk children or youth who lack role models and sponsors to mentors who act as role models and sponsors.

In business, formal mentoring is one of many talent management strategies that are used to groom key employees, newly hired graduates, high-potential employees, and future leaders. Matching mentors and mentees is often done by a mentoring coordinator with the help of a computerized database registry, which usually suggests matches based on the type of experience and qualifications being sought.

There are formal mentoring programs that are values-oriented, while social mentoring and other types focus specifically on career development. Some mentorship programs provide both social and vocational support. In well-designed formal mentoring programs, there are program goals, schedules, training (for both mentors and protégés), and evaluation.

=== Informal mentoring ===
Informal mentoring (also called "naturally occurring mentoring") occurs without the use of structured recruitment, mentor training and matching services. It can develop naturally between partners, such as business networking situations where a more experienced individual meets a new employee and the two build a rapport. Apart from these types, mentoring takes a dyadic structure in science, technology, engineering, mathematics, and medicine (STEMM).

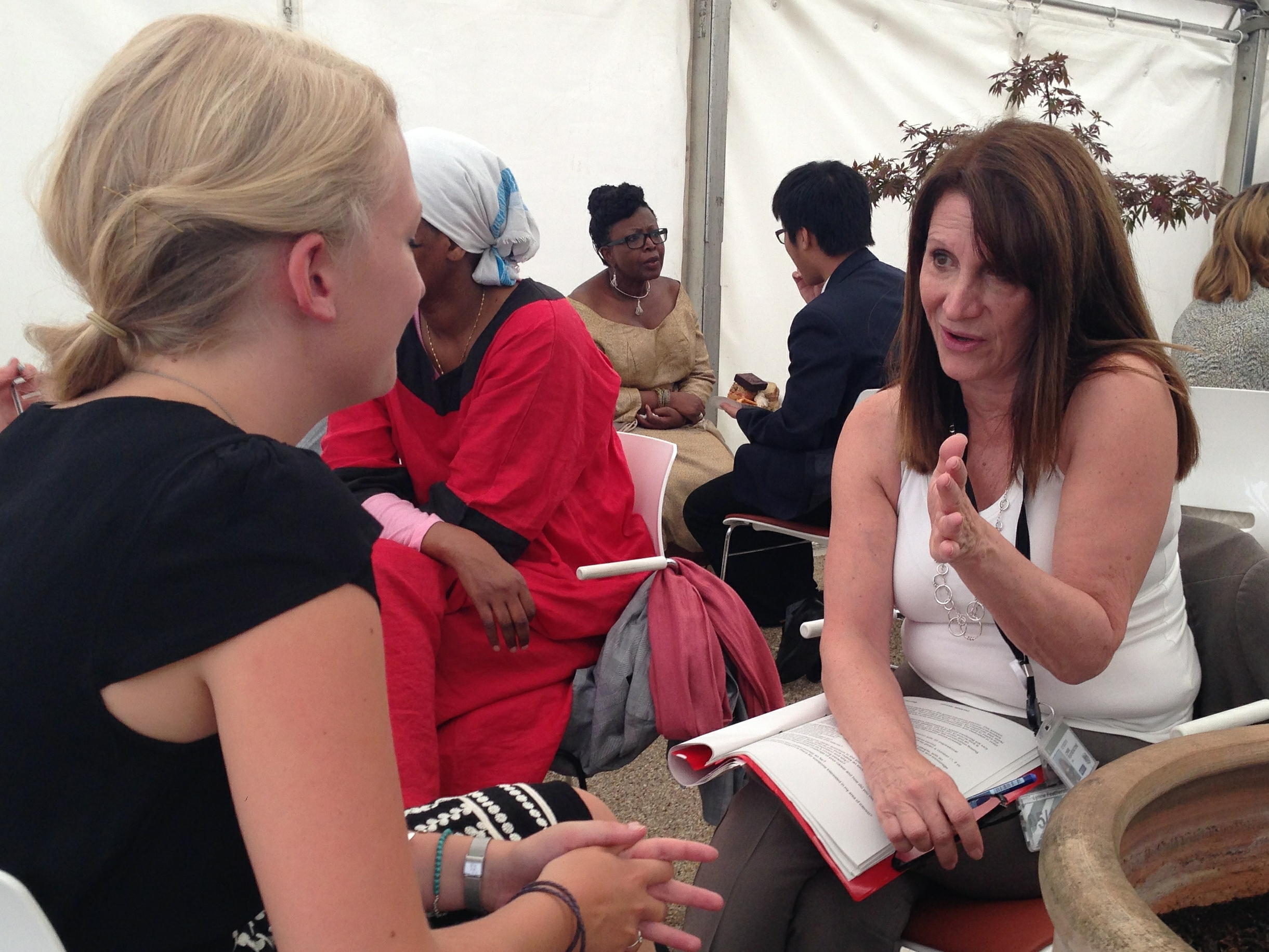
A woman provides mentoring at the Youth For Change program.

Informal mentoring of youth commonly takes the form of guidance from an adult who is engaged with the youth via a shared interest or common location, particularly in caring occupations (as a teacher or coach in their school, or clergy in their place of worship), or another supportive non-relative adult in their lives.

The conservative political journal National Affairs cites research indicating that the quantity and quality of such mentors are more limited for low-income youth than for more-privileged youth. One meta-analysis of various research data, comparing the effects of informal mentors on 3,158 middle-class youth with the effects of informal mentors on 795 low-income youth, found that the middle-class youth benefitted from greater upward mobility than peers without informal mentors; but the same was not true for low-income youth. However, another study found that -- though young people with many resources were more likely than other youth to have informal mentors -- youth with few resources are more likely to benefit from having an informal mentor (especially teacher-mentors).

Research has indicated a decline in both formal and informal mentoring of youth in the United States, between 2013 and 2022, with informal mentoring declining by 13%. Some analysts believe one factor contributing to the decline was the COVID-19 pandemic, limiting young people's access to mentors for prolonged periods due to the closing of formal mentoring programs, as well as closing schools, after-school and athletic programs, community events and various other activities where the young could meet mentors. Gatherings of extended family were likewise curtailed. Experts add that the pandemic's economic crisis, coupled with increasing socioeconomic inequality, may have added to the decline, because adults who are struggling financially may lack time or resources to mentor the young.

=== Models ===
There are many kinds of mentoring relationships from school or community-based relationships to e-mentoring relationships. These mentoring relationships vary and can be influenced by the type of mentoring relationship. There are several models that have been used to describe and examine the sub-relationships that can emerge: for example, Cindy Buell describes how mentoring relationships can develop:

- Cloning model: The mentor teaches the learner as if they were a clone of the mentor.
- Nurturing model: The mentor assumes a parental role to create an open, supportive environment where the learner can learn and try things themselves.
- Friendship model: The mentor acts more as a peer "rather than being involved in a hierarchical relationship".
- Apprenticeship model: The mentor and learner predominantly have a professional relationship.

=== Other types ===
- Peer mentoring: Relationships that involve individuals in similar positions. One person may be more knowledgeable in a certain aspect or another, and they can help each other progress in their work. In most cases, peer relationships provide a lot of support, empathy, and advice because the situations are quite similar.
- Situational mentoring: Short-term relationships in which a person mentors for a specific purpose. This could be a company bringing an expert in regarding social media, or internet safety. This expert can mentor employees to make them more knowledgeable about a specific topic or skill.
- Supervisory mentoring: This relationship involves a mentor with a higher position than the learner. The mentor can answer many questions and advise the best course of action.
- Mentoring circles: Participants from all levels of the organization propose and own a topic before meeting in groups to discuss the topic, which motivates them to grow and become more knowledgeable. Flash mentoring is ideal for situations like job shadowing and reverse mentoring.

== Benefits ==
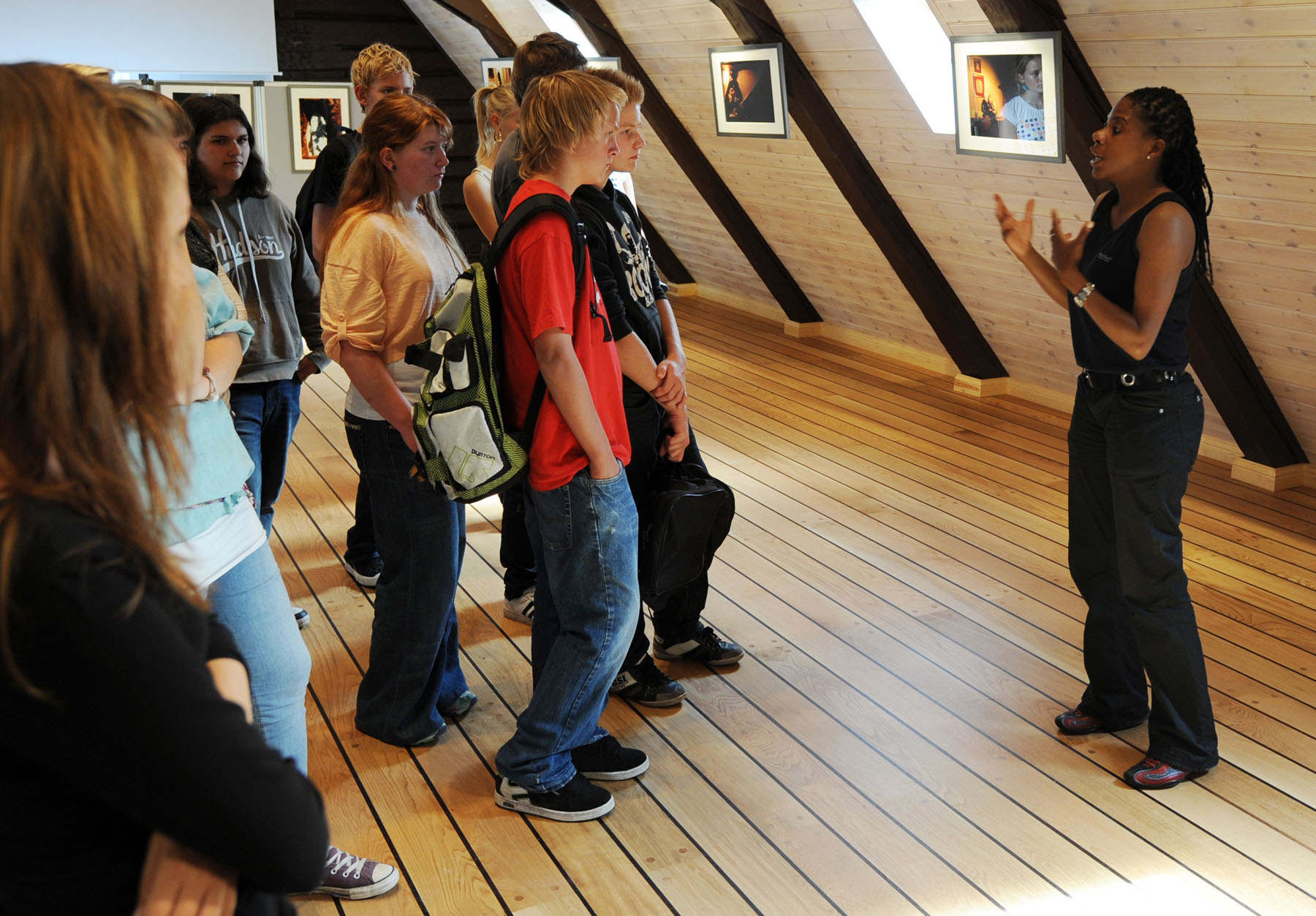
Mentor Neo Ntsoma (on the right) giving a workshop to young people

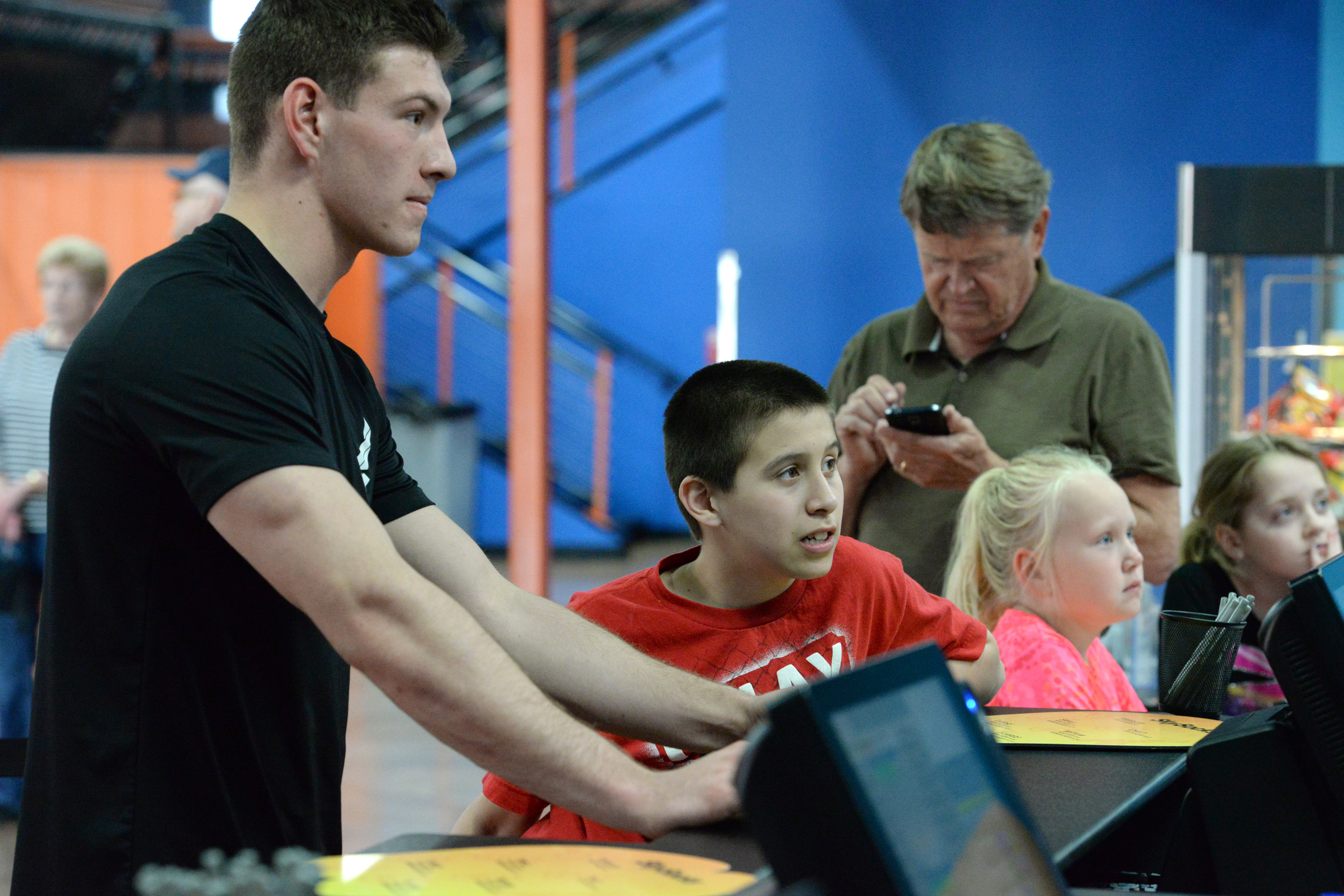
A US Air Force member providing youth mentoring

A meta-analysis of 112 individual research studies found mentoring has significant behavioral, attitudinal, health-related, relational, motivational, and career benefits. For a learner, these benefits depend on the different functions being performed by the mentor. Originally, the concept of mentoring functions developed from qualitative research in an organizational context with functions that belong under two major factors: psychosocial support (e.g. role modeling, friendship, emotional support, encouragement) and career-related support (e.g. providing advice, discussing goals). An early quantitative approach found role modeling to be a distinct third factor. In mentoring for college success, a fourth function concerning knowledge transfer was additionally identified, which was also discovered in the context of mentoring creativity.

There are also many benefits for an employer to develop a mentorship program for new and current employees:

- Career development: Setting up a career development mentoring program for employees enables an organization to help junior employees to learn the skills and behaviours from senior employees that the junior employees need to advance to higher-responsibility positions. This type of mentoring program can help to align organizational goals with employees' personal career goals of progressing within the organization. It gives employees the ability to advance professionally and learn more about their work. This collaboration also gives employees a feeling of engagement with the organization, which can lead to better retention rates and increased employee satisfaction.
- High potential mentoring: The most talented employees in organizations tend to be difficult to retain as they usually seek greater challenges and responsibilities and are likely to leave for a different organization if they do not feel that they are being given the opportunity to develop. Creating a mentoring program for high-potential employees that gives them one-on-one guidance from senior leaders can help engage employees, give them the opportunity to develop, and increase the likelihood of staying in the organization.
- Diversity mentoring: One of the top ways to innovate is by bringing in new ideas from senior employees and leaders from underrepresented groups (e.g., women, ethnic minorities, etc.). In many Western countries, women and ethnic minorities are significantly underrepresented in executive positions and boards of directors. However, in some traditionally gender-segregated occupations, such as education and nursing, women may be the dominant gender in the workforce. Mentors from underrepresented groups can empower employees from similar groups to increase their confidence to accept higher-responsibility tasks and prepare for leadership roles. Developing employees from diverse groups can give the organization access to new ideas, problem-solving approaches, and perspectives. These relationships tend to lead to success within the organization and increased job satisfaction. Majority mentors are given the opportunity to learn about and empathize with the culture and experiences of the minority learning, but the mentoring relationship can be impeded if they are unwilling to adapt their cultural views. Members of the majority culture are perceived as more competent while members of the minority culture receive less credit for the same amount of work; therefore, a majority mentor, by virtue of their status, can assist a minority learner in receiving the recognition and job advancement they deserve. Minority mentors often feel pressure to work harder than other mentors to prove their worth within an organization. However, when paired with majority learners, their perceived worth automatically increases due solely to the majority status of their peers. Minority mentors tend to impart emotional benefits to their learners. In a 1958 study, Margaret Cussler showed that for each female executive she interviewed who did not own her own company, "something—or someone—gave her a push up the ladder while others halted on a lower rung." Cussler concluded that the relationship between the "sponsor and protégé" (the vocabulary of "mentorship" was not yet in common use) was the "magic formula" for success. By the late 1970s, numerous publications had established the centrality of mentorship to business success for everyone and particularly for women trying to enter the male-dominated business world. These publications noted the many benefits provided by mentorship, which included insider information, education, guidance, moral support, inspiration, sponsorship, protection, promotion, the ability to "bypass the hierarchy", the projection of the superior's "reflected power," access to otherwise invisible opportunities, and tutelage in corporate politics. The literature also showed the value of these benefits: for example, a Harvard Business Review survey of 1,250 top executives published in 1979 showed that most employees that had been mentored or sponsored and that those who received such assistance reported higher incomes, better education, quicker paths to achievement, and more job satisfaction than those who did not. The literature particularly emphasized the necessity of mentoring for businesswomen's success: although women comprised less than one percent of the executives in the Harvard Business Review survey, all of these women reported being mentored. In subsequent decades, as mentoring became a widely valued phenomenon in the United States, women and minorities in particular continued to develop mentoring relationships consciously as they sought professional advancement.
- Reverse mentoring: While mentoring typically involves a more experienced, typically older employee or leader providing guidance to a younger employee, the opposite approach can also be used. With the rise of digital innovations, Internet applications, and social media in the 2000s, new, younger employees may be more familiar with these technologies than senior employees in organizations. The younger generations can help the older generations expand and grow with current trends.
- Knowledge transfer mentoring: Employees must have a certain set of skills in order to accomplish the tasks at hand. Mentoring can teach employees to be organized. It can also give them access to an expert that can provide feedback and answer questions.

Hetty van Emmerik did a similar study that looked at the effects of mentorship in the context of difficult working situations. Several major findings were made as a result of this research:

1. Mentoring has been linked to improved job performance (i.e. intrinsic job satisfaction and career satisfaction).

2. Mentoring diminishes the negative association between unfavourable working circumstances and positive job outcomes, making the relationship stronger for those without a mentor than for those who have one.

3. Mentoring has been found to be negatively connected with all three characteristics of burnout (emotional weariness, depersonalization, and decreased personal accomplishment) employee outcomes.

== Contemporary research and practice in the US ==
Partly in response to a study by Daniel Levinson, research in the 1970s led some women and African Americans to question whether the classic "white male" model was available or customary for people who are newcomers in traditionally white male organizations. In 1978 Edgar Schein described multiple roles for successful mentors. He identified seven types of mentoring roles in his book Career Dynamics: Matching individual and organizational needs (1978). He said that some of these roles require the teacher to be, for example, an "opener of doors, protector, sponsor and leader".

Capability frameworks encourage managers to mentor staff. Although a manager can mentor their own staff, they are more likely to mentor staff in other parts of their organisation, staff in special programs (such as graduate and leadership programs), staff in other organisations or members of professional associations.

Mentoring covers a range of roles. Articulating these roles is useful not only for understanding what role an employee plays, but also for writing job applications.

Two of Schein's students, Davis and Garrison, studied successful leaders who differed in ethnicity and gender. Their research presented evidence for the roles of: cheerleader, coach, confidant, counsellor, developer of talent, "griot" (oral historian for the organization or profession), guardian, guru, inspiration, master, "opener of doors", patron, role model, pioneer, "seminal source", "successful leader", and teacher. They described multiple mentoring practices which have since been given the name of "mosaic mentoring" to distinguish this kind of mentoring from the single mentor approach.

Mosaic mentoring is based on the concept that almost everyone can perform one or another function well for someone else — and also can learn along one of these lines from someone else. The model is seen as useful for people who are "non-traditional" in a traditional setting, such as non-white people and women in a traditionally white male organization. The idea has been well received in medical education literature.

== Corporate programs ==
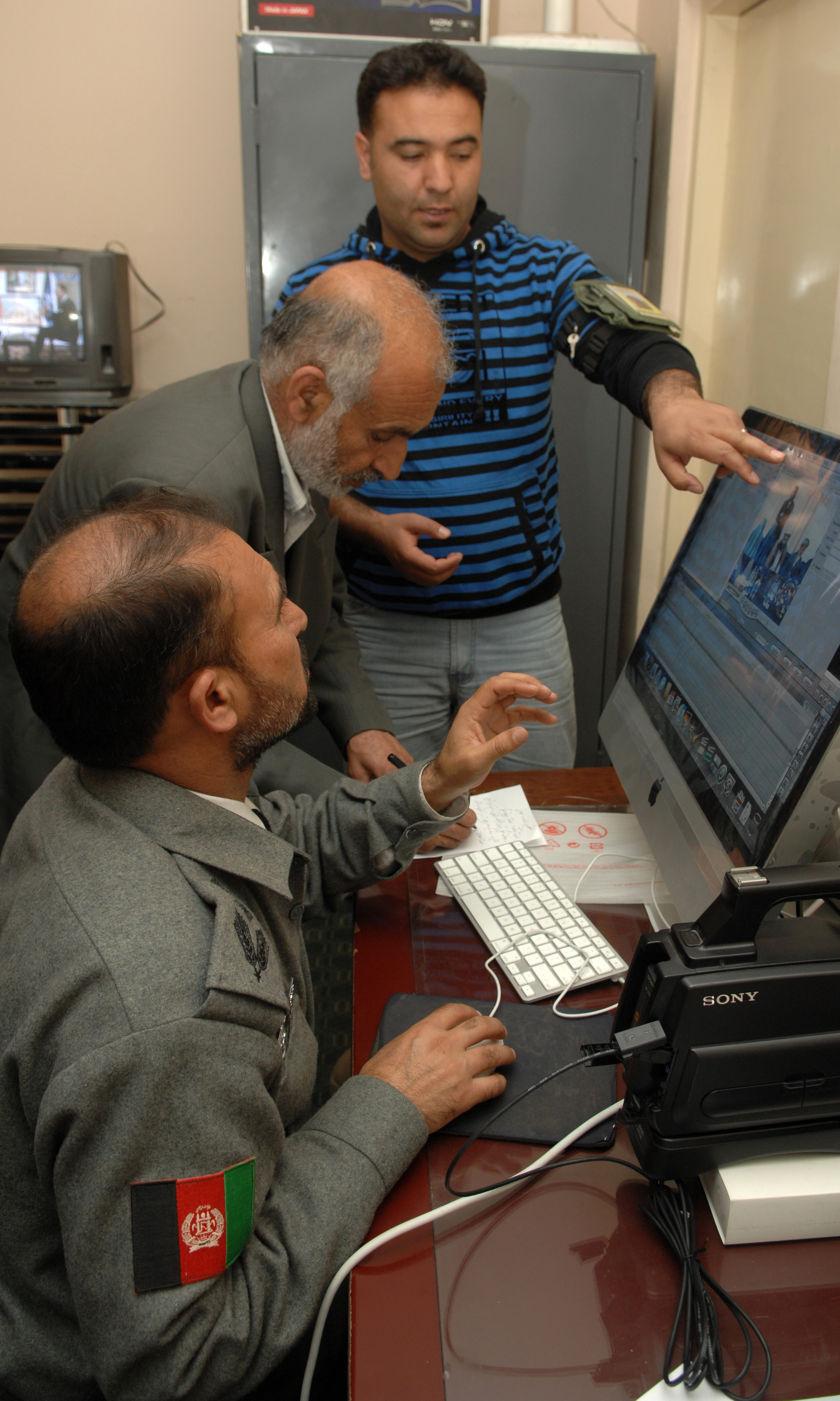
A NATO mentor trains two broadcasters on video editing and storytelling techniques.

Corporate mentoring programs may be formal or informal and serve a variety of specific objectives, including the acclimation of new employees, skills development, employee retention, and diversity enhancement.

The relationship between mentoring, commitment, and turnover was investigated in one study at Texas A&M University. "Mentoring may really contribute to better degrees of emotional and lasting commitment to an organisation," according to the study's findings. (Huffman and Payne, 2005).

=== Formal programs ===
Formal mentoring programs offer employees the opportunity to participate in an organized mentoring program. Participants join as a mentor, learner, or both by completing a mentoring profile. Mentoring profiles are completed as written forms on paper or computer or filled out via an online form as part of an online mentoring system. Learners are matched with a mentor by a program administrator or a mentoring committee, or they may self-select a mentor depending on the program format.

Informal mentoring takes place in organizations that develop a culture of mentoring but do not have formal mentoring in place. These companies may provide some tools and resources and encourage managers to accept mentoring requests from more junior members of the organization.

A study of 1,162 employees found that "satisfaction with a mentoring relationship had a stronger impact on attitudes than the presence of a mentor, whether the relationship was formal or informal, or the design of a formal mentoring program". Even when a mentoring relationship is established, the actual relationship is more important than the presence of a relationship.

Fortune 500 companies are also implementing formal mentoring programs globally. Cardinal Health has had an enterprise-wide formal mentoring initiative in place since 2011. The initiative encompasses nine formal mentoring programs, some enterprise-wide and some limited to specific business segments and functions. Goals vary by program, with some focused on employees facing specific challenges or career milestones and others enabling more open-ended learning and development.

=== New-hire programs ===
New-hire mentoring programs are set up to help new employees adjust more quickly to the organization. In new-hire mentoring programs, newcomers to the organization (learners) are paired with more experienced people (mentors) in order to obtain information, good examples, and advice as they advance. Beverly Kaye and Sharon Jordan-Evans claim that new employees who are paired with a mentor are twice as likely to remain in their job than those who do not receive mentorship.

These mentoring relationships promote career growth and benefit both the mentor and the learner: for example, the mentor can show leadership by teaching; the organization receives an employee that is shaped by the organization's culture and operation because they have been under the mentorship of an experienced member; and the learner can network, integrate easier into the organization, and acquire experience and advice. Donnalyn Pompper and Jonathan Adams say that "joining a mentor's network and developing one's own is central to advancement", which likely explains why those mentored tend to do well in their organizations.

In the organizational setting, mentoring usually "requires unequal knowledge", but the process of mentorship can differ. Bullis describes the mentoring process in the form of phase models. Initially, the "mentee proves himself or herself worthy of the mentor's time and energy". Then cultivation occurs which includes the actual "coaching...a strong interpersonal bond between mentor and mentee develops". Next, under the phase of separation, "the mentee experiences more autonomy". Ultimately, there is more equality in the relationship, termed by Bullis as Redefinition.

=== High-potential programs ===
High-potential mentoring programs are used to groom up-and-coming employees deemed to have the potential to move up into leadership or executive roles. The employee (learner) is paired with a senior-level leader (or leaders) for a series of career-coaching interactions. These programs tend to be smaller than general mentoring programs and learners that meet a list of criteria can be selected to participate. Another method of high-potential mentoring is to place the employee in a series of jobs in disparate areas of an organization (e.g. human resources, sales, operations management, etc.) for short periods of time, so they can learn in a hands-on, practical fashion, about the organization's structure, culture, and methods.

== Matching approaches ==
Matching by committee

Learners are matched with mentors by a designated mentoring committee that usually consists of senior members of the training, learning and development group and/or the human resources departments The matching committee reviews the mentors' profiles and the coaching goals sought out by the learners and makes matches based on areas for development, mentor strengths, overall experience, skill set, location, and objectives.

Matching through self-match technology

Mentoring technology, typically based on computer software, can be used to facilitate matches allowing learners to search for and select a mentor based on their own development, coaching needs, and interests. This learner-driven methodology increases the speed of matches being made and reduces the amount of administrative time required to manage the program. The quality of matches increases with self-match programs because mentorships tend to be more successful when the learner is involved in selecting their mentor. There are a variety of online mentoring technology programs available that can be used to facilitate this mentee-driven matching process.

Speed networking

In speed networking, Mentors and learners are introduced to each other in short sessions, allowing each person to meet potential matches in a very short timeframe. Speed networking occurs as a one-time event in order for people "to meet potential mentors to see if there is a fit for a longer term engagement".

Mentoring direct reports

Mentoring direct reports may be considered a form of Transformational Leadership, specifically that of Individualized Consideration.

== In education ==
Mentoring in education involves a relationship between two people where the mentor plays a supportive and advisory role for the student, the learner. This relationship promotes "the development and growth of the latter's skills and knowledge through the former's experience".

Mentorship is crucial to high-quality education because it promotes individual development and growth while also ensuring the "passing on" of skills and professional standards to the next generation.

In many secondary and post-secondary schools, mentorship programs are offered to support students in program completion, confidence building, and transitioning to further education or the workforce. There are also peer mentoring programs designed specifically to bring under-represented populations into science and engineering.

=== Resilience ===
A specific focus of youth mentoring that addresses the issues that cause students to underachieve in education while simultaneously preparing them to deal with difficult circumstances that can affect their lives in the future and alter their success is the fostering of resilience. Resilience has been found to be a useful method when working with students from low socioeconomic backgrounds who often encounter crises or challenges and suffer specific traumas. Education, students' performance, and achievement in school are directly affected by these challenges, so certain negative psychological and environmental situations that students from lower socioeconomic backgrounds disproportionately encounter provide a framework for explaining the achievement gap. Resilience does not provide a solution to the struggles and trauma that these students experience, but instead focuses on giving them the tools to adapt to these situations and respond to them in ways that avoid negative outcomes and enables them to grow stronger and learn from the experience.

==== Protective factors and risk factors ====
Protective factors "modify or transform responses to adverse events so that [students] avoid negative outcomes" and encourage the development of resilience. Their development enables students to apply them to challenges and engage in them positively that does not negatively affect their education, personal lives, or successes. Examples of these protective factors identified by Reis, Colbert and Hebert in their three-year study of economically disadvantaged and ethnically diverse students include "supportive adults, friendships with other achieving students, the opportunity to take honors and advanced classes, participation in multiple extracurricular activities both after school and during the summer, the development of a strong belief in the self, and ways to cope with the negative aspects of their school, urban and family environment." On the other hand, risk factors impede the student's ability to positively engage in their challenges and in many cases prevent these students from achieving at the same level as students who do not encounter the same situations, and can include family tragedy, having an older sibling who became involved in drugs and/or alcohol, family instability, personal pain and academic failure. "Just as risk factors and childhood stressors may co-occur within a particular population or within a particular developmental period, protective factors are also likely to occur together to some degree."

==== Counseling and guidance ====
Underachieving students who come from risk factor-filled environments often have little support, so the role of educators can be beneficial for students if it extends beyond the basic structures within the classroom. In these environments, students are often exposed to coercive interactions, so positive, personal and harmonious interchanges between the student and a supportive figure can help develop adaptive qualities. Teachers who see students as talented and care about them as individuals by establishing a genuine relationship create their additional roles as a mentor and advocate—an extra familial support system that can serve as an additional protective factor. A supportive adult can help reduce the negative impact of certain events and risk factors while strengthening the positive factors that help them cope effectively. Some of the components that facilitate the development of resilience when combined with a strong adult-student relationship include afterschool programs, more challenging classes, peer support programs, summer programs, and gifted programs. By getting to know students better—especially their home life and individual circumstances—teachers and counselors can provide specific support to each student by looking beyond their disadvantaged backgrounds, recognizing their abilities, nurturing their strengths, and maintaining high expectations.

=== Instructional coaches ===
Instructional coaches are former teachers or principals that have shown effectiveness in their work of teaching or leading and go through additional training to learn more about the technical skills needed to be an effective coach. In her book The Art of Coaching, Elena Aguilar recommends that a coach "must have been an effective teacher for at least five years". Although skills that were effective in the classroom are required, the coach must also be confident in working with adults and bring strong listening, communication, and data analysis skills to the coaching position. Ultimately, an instructional coach is a former teacher who was successful in the classroom and is respected in the field, with the respect carrying over into this new position.

==== Activities ====
Coaches work one-on-one with teachers or in a small group setting with teachers to build student achievement in the classroom based on data collected and discussed by teachers or coaches. According to Melinda Mangin and KaiLonnie Dunsmore, instructional coaching models may include "cognitive coaching, clinical supervision, peer coaching and mentoring, formal literacy coaching, informal coaching, or a mixed model." "Other researchers have described categories of coaching such as data-oriented, student-oriented, managerial, and coaches who work with individual teachers or with groups of teachers". Ultimately, coaching roles are designed to increase teacher capacity and push teacher improvement through learning opportunities. Instructional coaching is embedded within a teacher's work; in other words, the coach works with the teacher throughout the school year and meets during the school day with the teacher regarding current lessons, planning, and the observations and data collected. Discussions between the instructional coach and teacher are built upon mutual respect and a trusting relationship through confidentiality. Overall, instructional coaching is meant to serve as professional development for the teacher.

A coach's main responsibility is to change a teacher's practice and build their knowledge on "new instructional materials, programs, and initiatives". This professional development can come from discussion, model lessons, and instructional strategies. Teacher observations are one of the most powerful ways that coaches can put data for change in front of teachers. Coaches making observations and collecting data to debrief with teachers helps facilitate teacher improvement.

==== Effectiveness ====
According to a three-year research study done by the Pennsylvania Institute for Instructional Coaching, there was an increase in student success when instructional coaching was used in the classroom. This could not be viewed as solely "instructional coaching" in isolation of other factors. The coaching "model emphasizes the simultaneous use of four strategies: one-on-one teacher engagement; evidence-based literacy practices applied across the curriculum; data analytics; and reflection on practice". Teachers have shared that:

- Ninety-one percent of teachers coached regularly stated that coaches helped them understand and use new teaching strategies.
- Seventy-nine percent of teachers coached regularly said that their coach played a significant role in improving their classroom instruction and practice.

Teachers who were regularly coached one-on-one reported that:

- They made significant changes in their instructional practice.
- Their students were more engaged in the classroom and enthusiastic about learning.
- Attendance increased dramatically in their classes.

In addition to this, "the most effective professional development model is thought to involve follow-up activities, usually in the form of long-term support, coaching in teachers' classrooms, or ongoing interaction with colleagues". In most cases, instructional coaching can provide this support and meet this definition of effective professional development.

===== Administrative support =====
Aguilar states that there should also be support from administration around the instructional coaching to align the work of the coach and teacher with the school's mission or vision. Jim Knight focuses on the partnership with the principal being at the core of successful coaching and explains that the principal and the instructional coach need to be aligned in their goals for the coaching. If they have different desired outcomes for teaching, then the teacher will receive mixed messages and be caught between improvement and a standstill. Aguilar suggests that coaches continually ask about the school's goals as well as action steps to bring into daily coaching to meet them.

===== Data-driven strategies =====
Knight's belief of data usage is critical for teacher improvement during coaching sessions. He shares how giving opinions and telling a teacher how to improve stops the learning for the teacher; instead, it creates a barrier between the coach and teacher and makes the teacher expect to be instructed throughout the process.

===== Relationship building =====
The relationship and trust between the coach and coachee are a critical component of coaching. A coach that has specific content knowledge and respect in a teacher's field of teaching can help build trust. Another way to build this trust is through confidentiality. In addition to relationship building, it is important to let the coachee feel comfortable talking to their coach about anything. Starting a coaching conversation about how a coachee is doing is also important to relationship building.

Mentor-mentee relationships are viewed by the mentee as more valuable when the two meet frequently and are more closely aligned on deeper features (such as shared values and attitudes), rather than surface-level similarities (such as age, race or gender) - though common experiences and backgrounds do provide some benefit. Mentees report that more valuable mentor-mentee relationships provide them with a stronger sense of organisational affiliation, reduce their likelihood of leaving, increase their satisfaction and learning, and enhance their perceptions of career success.

===== Content and pedagogical knowledge =====
According to Nelson and Sassi, "knowledge of pedagogical process and content knowledge must be fused" in both understanding teaching and observing teaching. For example, an instructional coach working with a math teacher should know "current mathematics education reform efforts are built on the notion that the ideas in a subject, and the ways in which students and teachers work with the ideas, matter". A deep pedagogical knowledge and deep content specific knowledge are required for the teacher to have confidence in the coach and for the coach to be able to step in and assume the role of the teacher.

Knowledge that coaches need to be effective includes content and pedagogical knowledge. Aguilar uses the ladder of inference to allow coaches to evaluate their own thoughts, and ultimately use this ladder to help principals and teachers evaluate their own beliefs before jumping to assumptions. Approaches to teaching, classroom management, and content knowledge can change.

== Blended mentoring ==
Blended mentoring is the implementation of information technology (IT) into the traditional mentoring program, and is intended to give the opportunity to career counseling and development services to adopt mentoring in their standard practices. Compared to a strict form of e-mentoring where communication between the mentor and learner is done electronically, and the traditional model of face-to-face mentoring, blended mentoring has been found to increase student satisfaction (which is inherently tied to effectiveness) by combining online group mentoring sessions with individual, face-to-face meetings with a mentor. By incorporating IT with the traditional mentoring method, students can benefit from the technologies of e-mentoring while receiving direct and personal advice from the traditional method.

== Business mentoring ==
Business mentoring differs from apprenticeship: a business mentor provides guidance to a business owner or an entrepreneur on the entrepreneur's business, whereas an apprentice learns a trade by working on the job with the "employer".

A 2012 literature review by EPS-PEAKS investigated business mentoring, mainly focused on the Middle-East and North Africa region. The review found strong evidence to suggest that business mentoring can have real benefits for entrepreneurs, but highlights some key factors that need to be considered when designing mentoring programmes, such as the need to balance formal and informal approaches and to appropriately match mentors and learners.

== Cup Framework of Mentoring ==
The Cup Framework is a form of learning about a mentor's and mentee's relationship. There are two factors to consider in relation to the mentee in this framework: content and context. The inputs that a mentee is absorbing are referred to as content. This is information about their profession, life, and other things that they constantly absorb, process, and comprehend during the day. The capacity of the mentee to understand and absorb information is referred to as context.

The Cup Framework can be used to create an organisational culture that values and encourages employee growth, as well as allowing mentors to feel fulfilled in their roles without having to invest too much time and attention away from their own work.

== See also ==
- Big Brothers Big Sisters of America
- Coaching
- eMentors
- Father complex
- Maybach Foundation
- MENTOR
- New Teacher Center
- Peer mentoring
- Speed networking
- Youth mentoring
- Workplace mentoring
- Youth intervention
