= Mount Roland =

Mount Roland is the name of several mountains:

- Mount Roland Conservation Area in Tasmania, Australia
- Mount Roland (Antarctica)
