= StudentMentor.org =

- Type: 501(c)(3) nonprofit organization
- Location: San Francisco, CA, USA
- Website: http://www.StudentMentor.org

StudentMentor.org is an American national college student mentoring program. The nonprofit organization seeks to increase college completion and student career readiness by utilizing its technology platform to connect college students with professionals.

According to a U.S. Department of Education study, students who met with advisors regularly during their freshman year had a 170% greater chance of completing their bachelor's degree than those who did not. CNN mentions, "StudentMentor is the first national online mentoring matchmaking service designed to pair up college students who have questions with experienced businesspeople who have answers."

According to USA Today, "Prospective mentors and mentees can join for free on StudentMentor’s web site and are matched according to their areas of common interest." Mentorships take place either in-person or virtually (e-mentoring). Mentees go on their way towards achieving their goals while mentors receive personal satisfaction and professional growth. StudentMentor.org checks with the pair throughout to see how the mentorship is progressing in addition to performing rigorous statistical analysis.

StudentMentor.org was founded in 2010 by Ashkon Jafari and Stephanie Bravo. According to a USA Today interview with Jafari, "The mentoring organization was launched because while students in grades K-12 have plenty of programs to find mentors, college students often don't have anyone to guide them. We know there is a huge need out there."
