= Roland Lake (Minnesota) =

Lake in the state of Minnesota, United States

- Location within Minnesota
- Location: Douglas County, Minnesota
- Coordinates: 45°47′54″N 95°43′20″W
- Type: lake

Roland Lake is a lake in Douglas County, in the U.S. state of Minnesota.

Roland Lake was named for John Roland, a pioneer settler.

== See also ==
- List of lakes in Minnesota
