= Geoffrey Boisi =

American banker

Geoffrey T. Boisi
- Born: c. 1947 (age 78–79)
- Education: Wharton School of the University of Pennsylvania; Boston College
- Occupation: Investment banker
- Years active: 1971–present
- Title: Chief Executive Officer, Investment Banking Officer and Vice-chairman of JPMorgan Chase; Founder, Chief Executive Officer and Chairman of the Beacon Group; Chairman of Roundtable Investment Partners

Geoffrey T. Boisi (/ˈbwɑːzi/ BWAH-zee; born c. 1947) is the founder, CEO and chairman of the Beacon Group, as well as the chairman of Roundtable Investment Partners. He held a number of senior executive roles in investment banks, including JPMorgan Chase and Goldman Sachs.

== Education ==
Boisi graduated from Boston College in 1969. He holds an MBA from the Wharton School of the University of Pennsylvania. Seven years after earning his MBA from Wharton, Boisi became the youngest partner at Goldman Sachs. As the management committee partner, he was given responsibility over the firm's worldwide investment banking activities.

== Career ==
Boisi w as chief executive officer, investment banking officer and vice-chairman of JPMorgan Chase from 2000 to 2003. He is the founding chairman and a senior partner of The Beacon Group, a private equity firm, and is chief executive officer.

From 1971 to 1993, Boisi worked for Goldman Sachs & Company, rising senior general partner and head of the investment banking business. Boisi co-founded and chair of The National Mentoring Partnership. He was a member of international advisory board at Oxford Analytica, Ltd. He was a trustee associate of Boston College and trustee of Carnegie Corp., of New York and The Brookings Institution. He is a trustee of the Papal Foundation and Joseph P. Kennedy Enterprises. He is a director of Oxford Analytica Ltd.

Boisi also is a director of Communities in Schools. He was an independent director of Freddie Mac from 2004 to December 2008. Boisi is a graduate from Boston College and co-chairs the capital campaign.
