= Vestar Capital Partners =

American private equity firm

- Company type: Private
- Industry: Private equity
- Founded: 1988; 38 years ago
- Headquarters: New York City, New York, United States
- Services: Leveraged buyout
- Website: www.vestarcapital.com

Vestar Capital Partners is an American private equity firm focusing on leveraged buyout transactions in middle-market companies in the United States.

The firm, which was founded in 1988, is headquartered in New York City with offices in Boston, Massachusetts and Denver, Colorado

== History ==
Vestar is a leading private equity firm specializing in management buyouts and growth capital investments. Vestar was founded in 1988 by principals of The First Boston Corporation’s Management Buyout Group. As of 2017, four of the original founders—Daniel O'Connell, Norman Alpert, Robert Rosner, and James Kelley—were still with the firm.

Since the firm's founding in 1988, the Vestar funds have completed more than 80 investments in companies with a total value of more than $46 billion.

In 2011, Vester Capital along with Warburg Pincus acquired a majority stake in Triton International from the Pritzker family.

In 2013, Vestar Capital acquired a majority stake in Roland Foods Corporation. The firm acquired Institutional Shareholder Services (ISS) from MSCI in 2014 for $364 million.

=== Investment funds ===
Between 1988 and 2019, Vestar raised seven private equity funds with total investor commitments of more than $8 billion. The first six of those funds have been fully invested.

- 1988 - Vestar Capital Partners ($35 million - Fully invested and liquidated)
- 1993 - Vestar Capital Partners II ($260 million - Fully invested and liquidated)
- 1997 - Vestar Capital Partners III ($803 million - Fully invested)
- 1999 - Vestar Capital Partners IV ($2.48 billion - Fully invested)
- 2005 - Vestar Capital Partners V ($3.7 billion - Fully invested)
- 2013 - Vestar Capital Partners VI ($804 million - Fully invested)
- 2019 - Vestar Capital Partners VII ($1.1 billion - Currently investing)
