= George Gale =

George Gale may refer to:

== Politicians ==
- George Gale (MP) (1490–1556), member of parliament for City of York
- George Gale (Maryland politician) (1756–1815), American politician

== Law ==
- George Alexander Gale (1906–1997), Canadian jurist
- George Gale (Wisconsin politician) (1816–1868), American judge

== Others ==
- George Gale (aeronaut) (1797–1850), English stage performer and balloonist
- George Washington Gale (1789–1861), priest and teacher
- George Gale (journalist) (1927–1990), British journalist
- George Gale (cartoonist) (1929–2003), British cartoonist
- George Albert Gale (1893–1951), American artist, shipbuilder and sailor
- Gales Brewery, George Gale and Co., English brewery

== See also ==
- George Gale House (disambiguation)
