= Clan Rollo =

Lowland Scottish clan

- Crest: A stag's head couped Proper
- Motto: La fortune passe partout (Fortune is everywhere)

Profile
- Region: Lowlands
- District: Perthshire

Chief
- David Eric Howard Rollo
- The 14th Lord Rollo
- Seat: Pitcairns House
Septs of Clan Rollo
Rillict, Rolloch, MacRolloch, McRolloch, Rollock, Rouli, Rolle, De Rollo

Clan Rollo is a Lowland Scottish clan seated at Pitcairns House, Perthshire. The Chief of the Clan is styled Lord Rollo.

== History ==
=== Origins of the Clan ===
The name Rollo is derived from the Old Norse Rolfr which was Latinised as Rollo. Rollo of Normandy, a Viking chieftain, was the first notable bearer of the name. In Scotland, it first appears on record in a charter of 1141 that was granted by Robert de Brus.

=== 14th and 15th centuries ===
Historian Black in his Surnames of Scotland lists numerous spelling variations for the name Rollo, and one Robert Rolloche received lands near Perth from David II of Scotland in 1369. In 1380 John Rollock of the chiefly Rollo family, who was secretary to David, Earl of Palatine of Strathearn and brother of Robert II of Scotland, received a charter from the king for the lands of Duncrub. John's son, Duncan Rollo of Duncrub was the Auditor of State Accounts until he died in 1419.

=== 16th century and Anglo-Scottish Wars ===
On 26 August 1511, William Rollo of Duncrub received a charter that erected his lands into a free barony. He is believed to have died at the Battle of Flodden in 1513, along with his eldest son Robert. The estates were inherited by Andrew Rollo who consolidated his position by marrying his cousin, Marion, who was heir to David Rollo of Manmure. One of Andrew's younger sons, Peter, became Bishop of Dunkeld and a judge of the Court of Session. His grandson was Sir Andrew Rollo who was knighted by James VI of Scotland.

=== 17th century and Civil War ===
The Clan Rollo were supporters of the king during the civil war. Their loyalty was rewarded by Charles II of Scotland who created Sir Andrew as Lord Rollo of Duncrub in January 1651 at Perth. However Lord Rollo was fined £1,000 by Oliver Cromwell who was in control of Scotland in 1654. Lord Rollo's fifth son was Sir William Rollo who was a gifted soldier, and a lieutenant of the royalist army leader James Graham, 1st Marquis of Montrose. He commanded the left wing of the royal army at the Battle of Aberdeen in 1644. He also followed Montrose in his famous forced march across mountainous terrain which surprised the forces of Archibald Campbell, 1st Marquis of Argyll and led to Argyll's defeat at the Battle of Inverlochy (1645). Rollo was later beheaded at Glasgow in October 1645 after being captured at the Battle of Philiphaugh where the royalists were defeated by the Covenanters.

Andrew Rollo, the third Lord Rollo supported the Glorious Revolution of 1688 that brought Mary II of England and her husband, the Prince of Orange to the throne.

=== 18th century ===
==== Jacobite risings ====
Despite the third Lord Rollo's support for the Prince of Orange, his son Robert Rollo, was a staunch Jacobite who attended the great hunt at Aboyne in August 1715, which was actually a secret council to plan the rising of that year. Robert Rollo fought at the Battle of Sheriffmuir and surrendered, along with the Marquess of Huntly, chief of Clan Gordon, to General Grant of the Clan Grant. He was imprisoned but later pardoned in 1717. Robert Rollo had seven children, and died peacefully at Duncrub in March 1758.

==== War of the Austrian Succession ====
Robert Rollo's eldest son, Andrew Rollo, 5th Lord Rollo was a professional soldier. During the War of the Austrian Succession he fought for the British at the Battle of Dettingen in 1743.

==== Seven Years' War ====
In 1758 the fifth Lord Rollo commanded the British 22nd Regiment of Foot. During the Seven Years' War in the Americas, he fought under General Murray in the last campaign which secured Canada for the British. In 1759 he captured the French Caribbean island of Dominica even though it was heavily fortified. In 1760 he was raised to the rank of brigadier general. He fought for two more years in the Caribbean. During this time both Barbados and Martinique fell to the British. However, his health was severely affected by the climate, and he returned to England in 1762 and died at Leicester in 1765.

The seventh Lord Rollo fought with distinction at the siege of Pondicherry in India where he commanded a force of marines. John, eighth Lord Rollo, was an officer in the 3rd Regiment of Foot Guards which is today the Scots Guards. The eighth Lord fought on the Continent between 1793 and 1795.

== Clan Chief ==
The present Chief: David Eric Howard Rollo, The 14th Lord Rollo of Duncrub, Baron Dunning of Dunning and Pitcairns, Chief of the Name and Arms of Rollo.

== See also ==
- Scottish clan
