= Kersal Moor =

Moorland in Salford, England

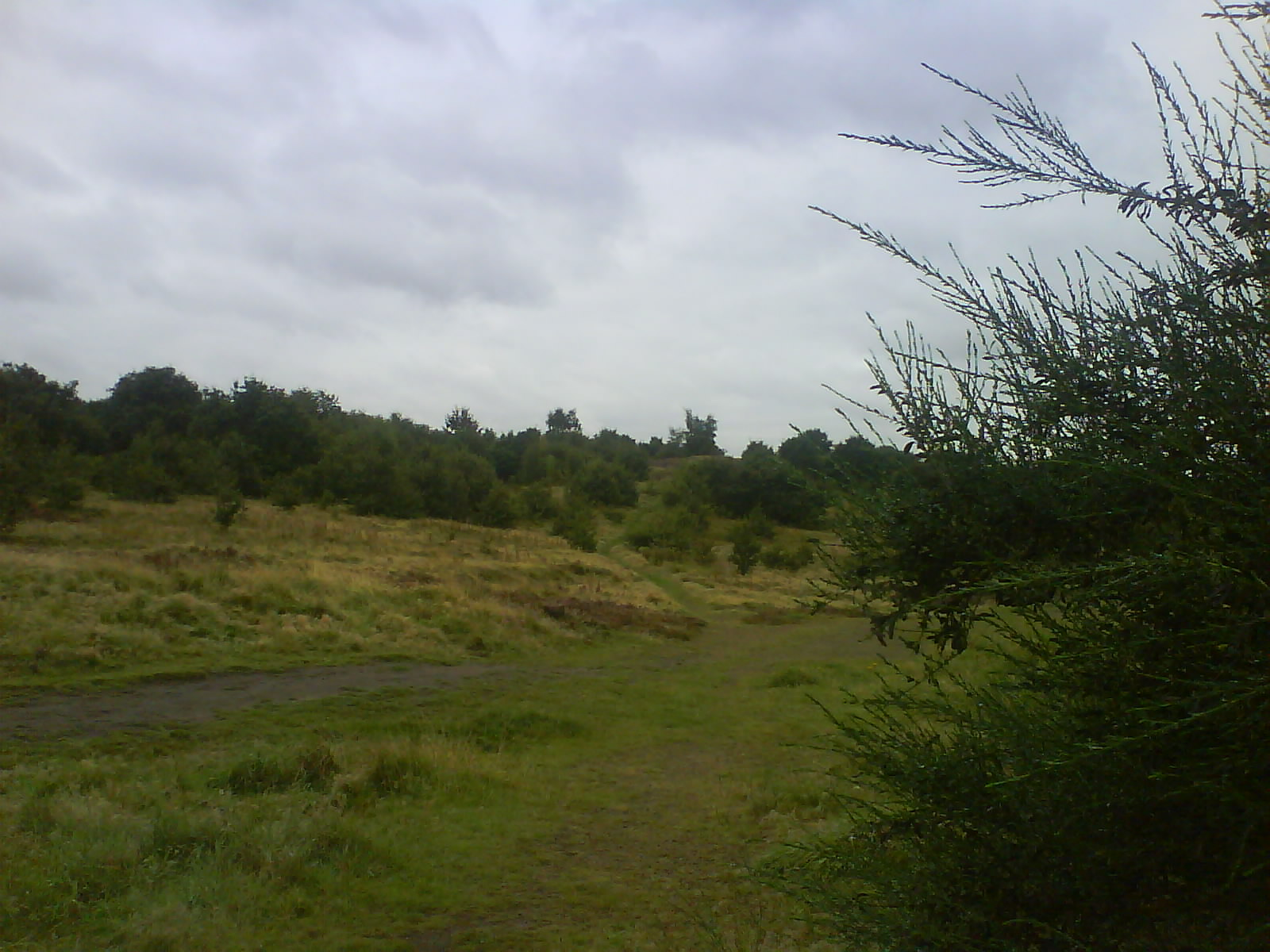
- Kersal Moor, August 2007

Highest point
- Elevation: 30 ft (9.1 m) to 75 feet (23 m)
- Coordinates: 53°30′55″N 2°16′35″W

Geography
- Location within Greater Manchester
- Location: Kersal, Greater Manchester, England
- OS grid: SD816021

Kersal Moor is a recreation area in Kersal, Greater Manchester, England which consists of eight hectares of moorland bounded by Moor Lane, Heathlands Road, St Paul's Churchyard and Singleton Brook.

Kersal Moor, first called Karsey or Carsall Moor, originally covered a much larger area, running down to the River Irwell. Evidence of activity during the Neolithic period has been discovered and the area was used by the Romans. It was the site of the first Manchester Racecourse and the second golf course to be built outside Scotland. It has been extensively used for other sporting pursuits, military manoeuvres and public gatherings such as the Great Chartist Meeting of 1838, prompting the political theorist Friedrich Engels to dub it "the Mons Sacer of Manchester".

With the increasing industrialisation and urbanisation of Manchester and Salford during the 18th and 19th centuries, the moor became one of the remaining areas of natural landscape of interest to amateur naturalists, one of whom collected the only known specimens of the now extinct moth species Euclemensia woodiella. It is now a Site of Biological Importance and in 2007 was designated as a Local Nature Reserve by English Nature.

== Geography ==
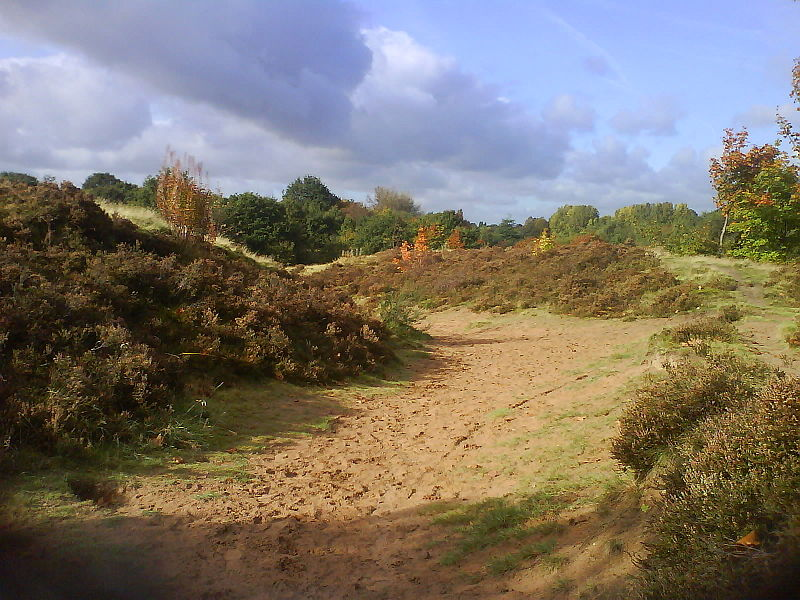
The sandhills on the north of the moor

Kersal Moor is one of the many fluvioglacial ridges that formed along the Irwell Valley during the melting of the glaciers at the end of the last ice age. Typically for this type of landform, the subsoil is composed of sand mixed with coarse gravel. The 19th century botanist Richard Buxton described this as "Mr E.W. Binney's drift deposit no.2 ... a deposit of sharp forest sand, parted with layers of gravel composed of Azoic, Palaeozoic and Triassic rocks, well rounded, parted with layers of fine sand, and having every appearance of a regular deposit by water." (Note: Edward William Binney FRS FGS was a founder member of the Manchester Geological Society see:Swindells, Thomas (August 2008). "E.W. Binney FRS. FGS.". Manchester Streets and Manchester Men. Bastian Books. p. 57. ISBN 978-0-554-72373-0.) This deposit is overlaid with a thin topsoil supporting a range of mosses, heathers, grasses, ferns, common broom, gorse and some trees, which are predominantly oak with some rowan, cherry and other broadleaved species. The land to the south is elevated, rising to a high point towards the south-west. From this elevated position there are views across Manchester to the Derbyshire hills in the south, to the Pennines in the north east and across the Irwell Valley and Salford in the west. The land falls away to the north, ending with two drumlin-shaped hills on the northern edge, which were probably formed by sediment from the meltwater of the receding glaciers, in a process known as sedimentary fluting. The moor is criss-crossed with footpaths, many of which cut through to the sand and gravel below. Singleton Brook, to the north of the moor, denotes the boundary between Salford and Prestwich.

== History ==
Flint scrapers, knives and other materials associated with Neolithic humans were discovered on the moor in the late 19th and early 20th century by local antiquarians such as Charles Roeder. The Roman road from Manchester (Mamucium) to Ribchester (Bremetennacum) roughly followed the line of the A56 road (Bury New Road) which is just to the east of Kersal Moor. There was a Roman camp at Rainsough just to the west, and some have speculated that there may have been a second camp to the east, in the area known as Castle Hill, making a defensive line across the moor to protect the north of Mamucium.

The 18th-century historian John Whitaker said of the moor:

"The moor of Kersal was in the time of the Romans, perhaps in that of the Britons before them, and for many ages after both, a thicket of oaks and a pasture for hogs; and the little knolls, that so remarkably diversify the plain, and are annually covered with mingled crowds rising in ranks over ranks to the top, were once the occasional seats of the herdsmen that superintended these droves into the woods."

However, the last of these trees were burnt around 1880.

=== Sport on the moor ===
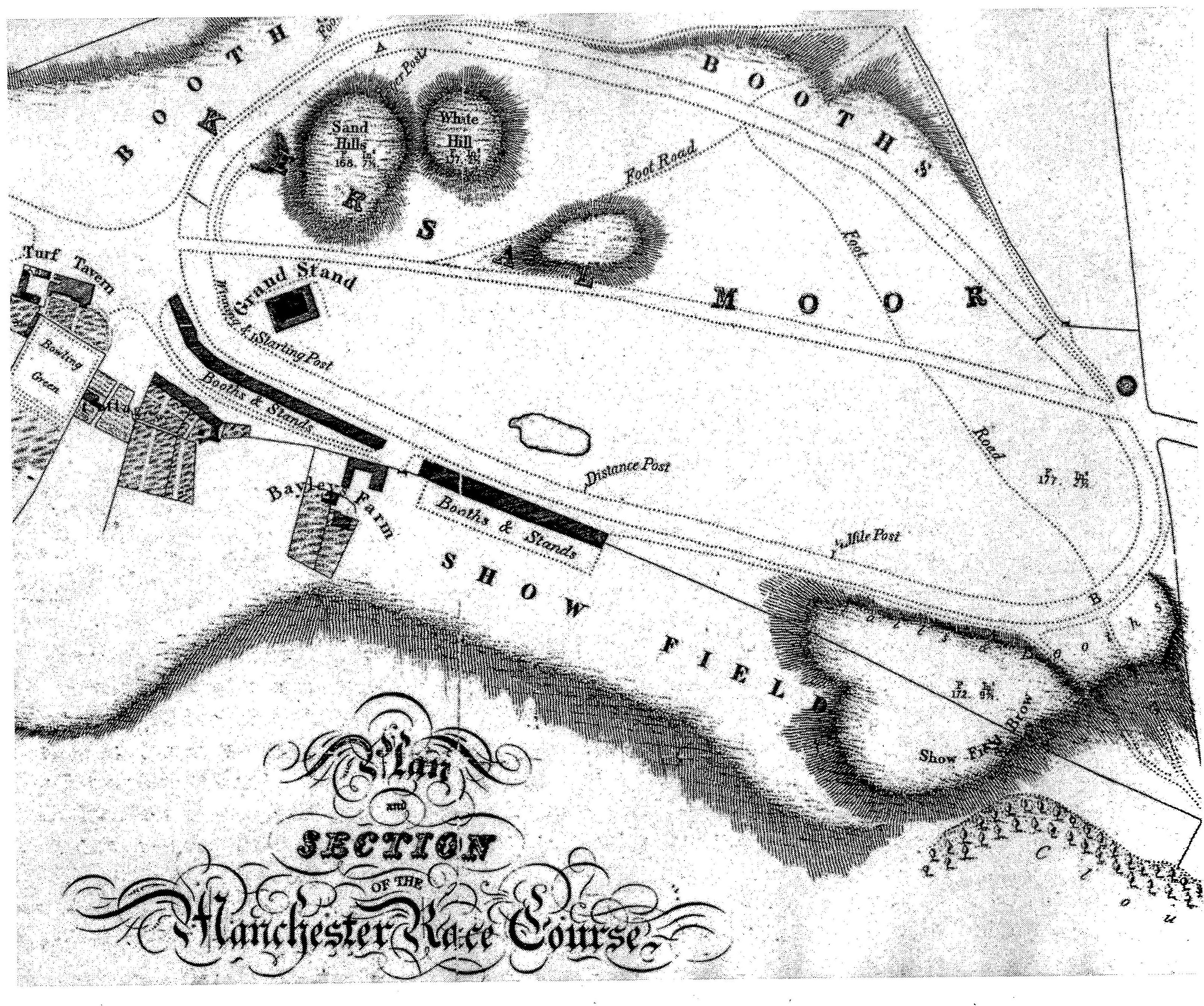
Manchester Racecourse on Kersal Moor

The first Manchester racecourse was sited on the moor. The earliest record of horse-racing is contained in the following notice in the London Gazette of 2–5 May 1687:

On Carsall Moore near Manchester in Lancashire on the 18th instant, a 20£. plate will be run for to carry ten stone and ride three heats, four miles each heat. And the next day another plate of 40£. will be run for at the same moore, riding the same heats and carrying the same weight. The horses marks are to be given in four days before to Mr. William Swarbrick at the King's Arms in Manchester.

The racecourse is shown on the map of 1848 as a roughly oval-shaped course extending around the west, north and east of the moor, crossing Moor Lane and carrying on around the ground that is now the home of Salford City F.C., roughly following the line of what is now Nevile Road. John Byrom (1692–1763), the owner of Kersal Cell, was greatly opposed to the racing and wrote a pamphlet against it, but the racing continued for fifteen years until, probably through Byrom's influence, they were stopped in 1746, the year of the Jacobite rising. After this there is known to have been at least one race in 1750; regular fixtures recommenced in 1759, and were then held every year until 1846, when they were transferred to the New Barns racecourse. Racing carried on there until the new Castle Irwell Racecourse was built, just across the river from the moor, in Lower Broughton in 1847. Today part of the course can still be seen as a wide, well-worn path stretching from east to west along the northern side of the moor.

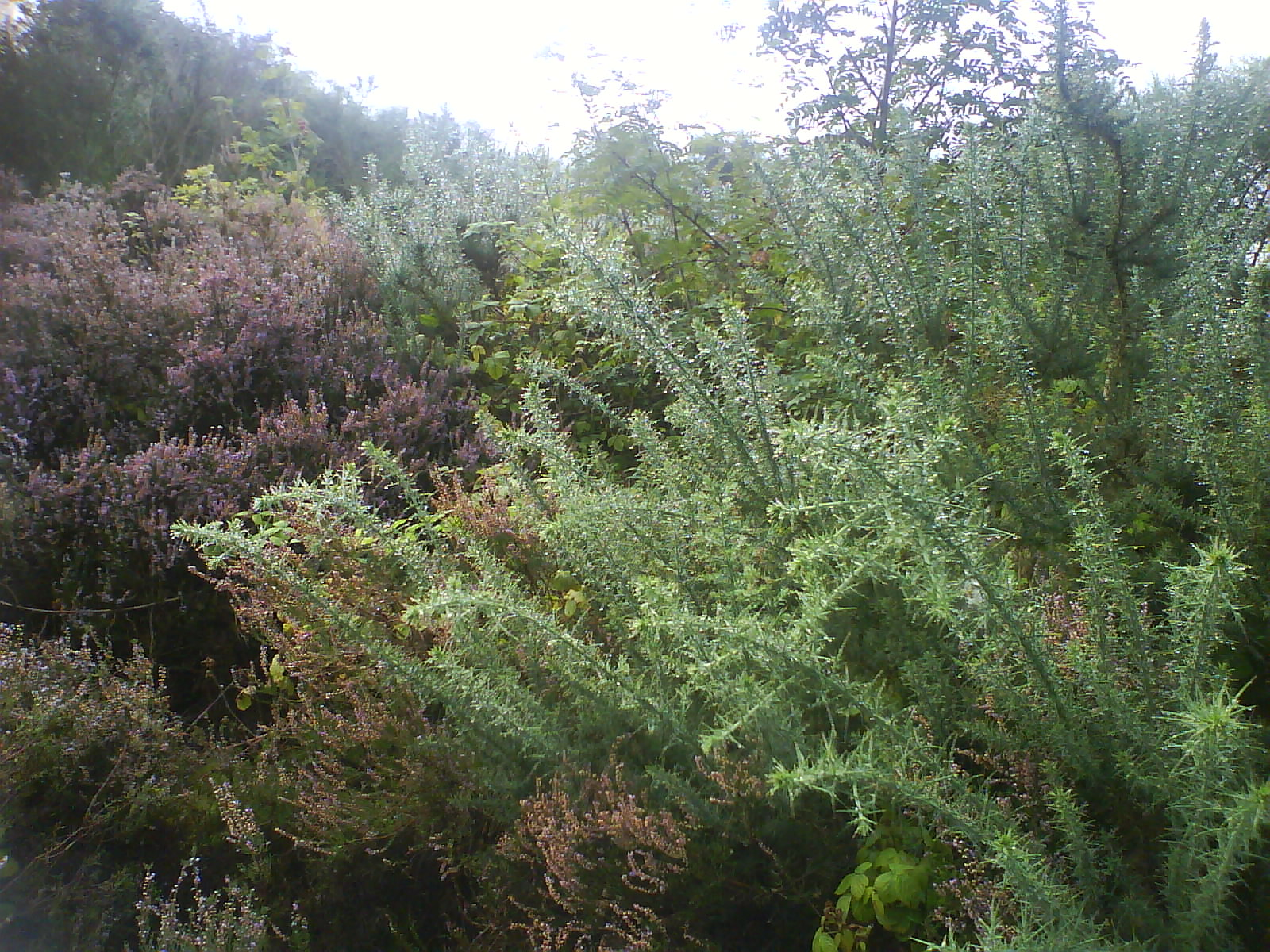
Heather and gorse

During the 18th century the moor was also used for nude male races, allowing females to study the form before choosing their mates. Indeed, in 1796 Roger Aytoun, known as "Spanking Roger" (who was later a hero of the siege of Gibraltar) acquired Hough Hall in Moston through marriage to the widowed Barbara Minshull, after such a race.

The moor has also been used for a number of other sporting activities. In the 18th and early 19th century archery was still practised as a village sport, and the archers of Broughton, Cheetham and Prestwich were renowned countrywide. The Broughton archers practised their sport on Kersal Moor and in 1793 the Manchester writer, James Ogden, composed a poem in praise of them, which begins:

The Broughton Archers, and the bowmen good
Of Lancashire, keep up the former name
Their sires acquir'd, for skill in archery ...

and ends with:

... Near Kersal Moor the Broughton archers fix
Their targets pierced with many a well aimed shot.

By 1830, however, archery had become the sport of gentlemen and an exclusive club called the "Broughton Archers" was formed, the membership of which included some of the most influential men in the town. They originally met at a public house nicknamed "Hard Backed Nan's" on the site of Bishopscourt where the Bishop of Manchester now resides, but after Bury New Road was built and the site became too public, they moved to the Turf Tavern on Kersal Moor. In 1818 a golf course was founded on the moor for the Manchester Golf Club, a group of Manchester businessmen, some of whom had emigrated from Scotland. This was only the second course to be built outside Scotland. The course at that time consisted of only five holes and had no fairways or greens as the players had to share the ground with other users. The club was very exclusive and by 1825 a club house had been built on Singleton Road. By 1869 the course had increased to nine holes and the club continued playing on the moor until 1862 when a new course was built a few hundred yards away at Kersal Vale.

The archery ground became Kersal Cricket Ground in 1847 and in 1881 the Northern Tennis Tournament was staged there. In 1919 the ground became the home of Manchester's oldest rugby club, Manchester Football Club. When Manchester F.C. moved in 1968 they were replaced briefly by Langworthy Juniors and then Salford City F.C., who still lease the ground today.

=== Public gatherings and military use ===
As one of the largest open spaces close to Manchester, the moor has a history of use for army manoeuvres and large public gatherings. In his book The Condition of the Working Class in England in 1844, Friedrich Engels referred to it as the Mons Sacer of Manchester. This was a reference to the hill to which the plebs (common citizens) of Rome withdrew en masse in 494 BC as an act of civil protest.

In 1789 and 1790 there had been a spate of highway and house robberies. Gangs of armed men had entered houses in the middle of the night and taken away all they could carry. Armed patrols were placed around the neighbourhood to little effect until, at last, a man named James Macnamara was arrested with three others for burglary at the Dog and Partridge Inn on Stretford Road. Macnamara was tried at Lancaster Assizes and sentenced to be hanged on Kersal Moor as a warning to other criminals. A large number of people came to watch the execution but, as Joseph Aston said in his Metrical Records of Manchester "no one could suppose that the example had any use ... as several persons had their pockets picked within sight of the gallows and the following night a house was broken into and robbed in Manchester".

The Stockport, Bolton and Rochdale Volunteers were reviewed on Kersal Moor on 25 August 1797 and in June 1812, 30,000 troops from the Wiltshire, Buckinghamshire, Louth and Stirling regiments were camped there ready for action to suppress the Luddites. In 1818 a protest meeting was held on the moor by coal miners to publicise their case for better pay, because of the dangers they faced at work.

A duel was fought on the moor in July 1804 between Mr. Jones and Mr. Shakspere Philips. Mr. Jones fired at Mr. Philips without effect and Mr. Philips then fired his pistol in the air, upon which the seconds interfered, the two man shook hands and honour was satisfied. Two weeks later, two other men who had been quarrelling in the newspapers met on the moor to gain satisfaction. However, the magistrates had been informed and the men were arrested before the duel could take place.

On 12 April 1831 the 60th Rifle Corps had carried out an exercise on the moor under the command of Lieutenant P.S. Fitzgerald, and a detachment of 74 men were returning to their barracks in Salford by way of Lower Broughton and Pendleton. As the men were crossing the Broughton Suspension Bridge, built four years earlier by Fitzgeralds's father, they felt it begin to vibrate in time with their footsteps, and before they had reached the other side the bridge collapsed. Although no one was killed twenty men were injured, six of them seriously. It was this incident that caused the British Military to issue the order for soldiers to "break step" when crossing a bridge.

In 1848, the moor was used as an encampment for the East Norfolk Regiment as part of an increased military presence in Lancashire brought about by the unrest caused by Chartist agitation.

The largest of a series of Chartist meetings was held on the moor on 24 September 1838. The meeting, which was planned as a show of strength and to elect delegates for the Chartist national convention, attracted speakers from all over the country and a massive crowd, which was estimated at 30,000 by the Manchester Guardian and 300,000 by the Morning Advertiser.

THE GREAT MEETING OF THE RADICALS OF LANCASHIRE (abridged from the Morning Advertiser)

Monday night, half-past six o'clock.

The morning was a lowering one but, notwithstanding this, crowds of persons began to assemble in the streets shortly after daybreak and many processions from the country had arrived by nine o'clock. The various trades of Manchester assembled in Smithfield, and previous to their marching to Kersal Moor, presented a formidable appearance in respect to numbers. The moor is nearly four miles distant from Manchester, and the ground fixed for the meeting is that upon which the Manchester Races take place. The hustings were erected near the Stand-House and in such a position that they were surrounded by an amphitheatre of at least fifteen acres, every person on any portion of the ground being enabled to see all that passed. All along the roads to Manchester the footpaths were thronged to excess, and in the area before the old Collegiate Church, which overlooked the procession, there were many thousands of females assembled. By twelve o'clock one half of the ground was occupied, and the immense multitude even at that time presented a truly awful appearance. Before one o'clock however the ground was completely occupied and the meeting then was certainly the largest that has ever taken place in the British Empire. – not less than 300,000 people could have been present. As the various speakers arrived upon the hustings they were loudly cheered ... – Freeman's Journal and Daily Commercial Advertiser (Dublin, Ireland)

The Chartists were active for the next eight months but the poor attendance at a second meeting, held on the moor at the same time as a racing fixture on 25 May 1839, signalled the end of the movement. Although the movement was not successful initially, most of the Chartists' demands were eventually met by Parliament.

=== Other pursuits ===
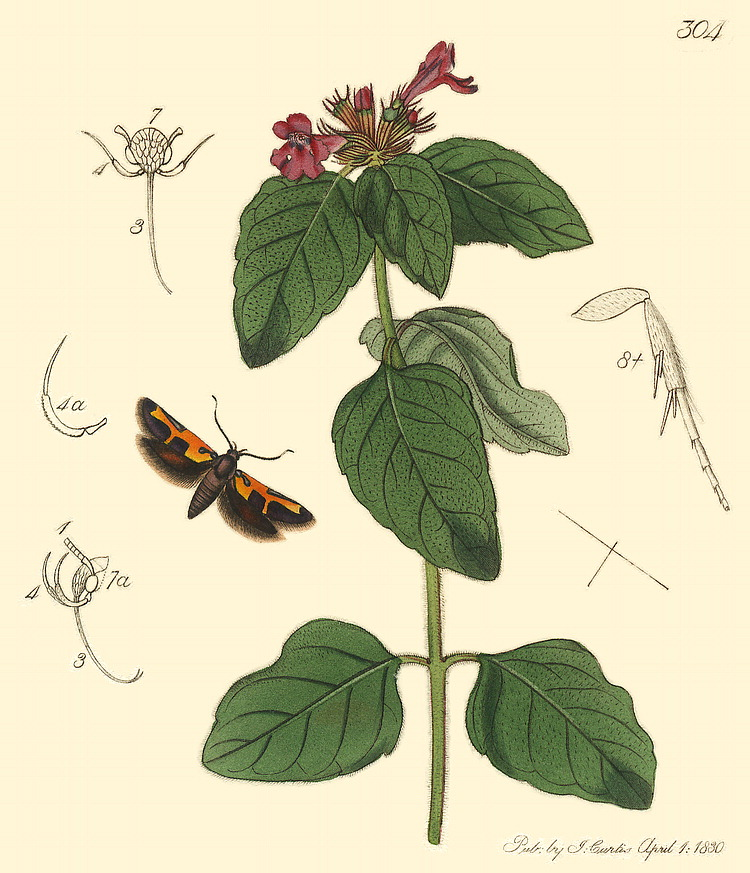
An engraving of the Manchester Tinea Euclemensia woodiella by John Curtis in British Entomology (1830)

As a relatively rural environment in an increasingly urbanised area, Kersal Moor was also used for more peaceful pursuits. During the 18th and 19th centuries it was much frequented by amateur naturalists and botanists. One of the botanists was Richard Buxton who went on to write A Botanical Guide to Manchester. In 1829 an amateur insect collector named Robert Cribb collected a series of about fifty small yellow and brown moths from a rotting alder on the moor. These turned out to be a previously unknown species of moth, but they were mistakenly attributed to a friend of Cribb's, the collector R. Wood, who had asked an expert to identify them. The moths were classified as Pancalia woodiella (today Euclemensia woodiella) in Wood's honour.

The only specimen I have seen of this beautiful Moth, which is larger than the others, is a female; it was taken on Kersall-moor the middle of last June by Mr. R. Wood, of Manchester, to whom I have the pleasure of dedicating it;—a most zealous and successful naturalist, to whose liberality I am indebted for many valuable insects. – John Curtis writing in British Entomology 1830

Enraged by this, and by accusations of fraudulently passing off foreign moths as British, Cribb gave up collecting and left the rest of the specimens with his landlady as security for a debt. Here the stories from Manchester University and The Australian Museum, Victoria differ as to whether it was Cribb's pub landlady or the landlady of his lodgings, but either way the result was the same. The debt was not paid on time and when Cribb went back for the moths, which he had already sold to another collector, his landlady had burnt them. Subsequent efforts by other collectors to find more of the moths were unsuccessful, and the three specimens left in existence are thought to be the only representatives of an extinct species.

Towards the end of the 19th century, a Mr. Cosmo Melvill contributed an article to the Journal of Botany in which he gave a list of more than 240 plants and flowers, not including mosses, that he had found on the moor.

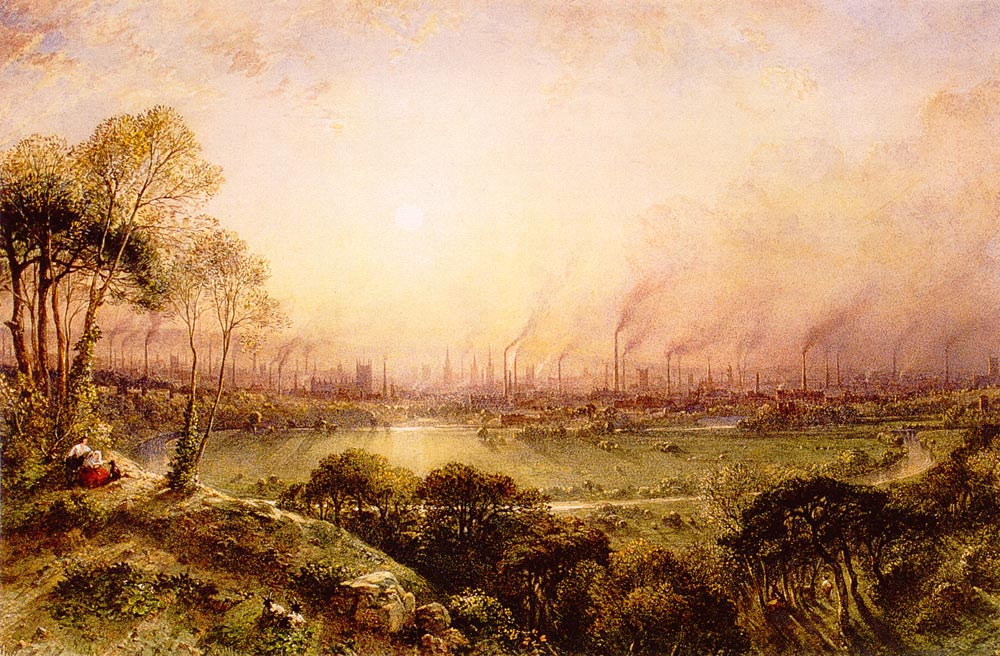
A view of Manchester from Kersal Moor, by William Wyld in 1852.

Shortly after 6:00 pm on 10 September 1848, the "celebrated aeronaut" George Gale ascended in a hot air balloon from Pomona Gardens in Hulme. After discharging a number of fireworks from a height of over 1,000 feet, Lieutenant Gale drifted in various directions and made abortive attempts to land in a number of locations. Eventually, at about 10:00 pm, the balloon descended safely in the farmyard of Mr Josiah Taylor on Kersal Moor.

In 1852, Queen Victoria commissioned a painting by the artist William Wyld which became A view of Manchester from Kersal Moor (pictured). The painting, which depicts the moor as a beautiful pastoral scene overlooking Castle Irwell racecourse and the industrial landscape of Manchester, is now in the Royal Collection, where it is listed as Manchester from Higher Broughton. A steel line engraving of the painting by the engraver Edward Goodall was also commissioned.

== Literary references ==
The English radical and writer Samuel Bamford mentions Kersal Moor in his book Passages in the Life of a Radical (1840–1844) when he advises one of his friends to make his way from Middleton to Bolton via Kersal Moor to avoid the authorities:

Healey I advised to go to his brother at Bolton, and get some money, and keep out of sight entirely, until something further was known. His best way would be to avoid Manchester, and go over Kersal moor and Agecroft bridge; and as I had a relation in that quarter who wished to see me, I would keep him company as far as Agecroft.

The races on the moor were mentioned in the 19th-century novel The Manchester Man by Mrs G Linnaeus Banks (1874). The hero of the story, Jabez Clegg, meets a street boy named Kit Townley, of whom Mrs Banks says:

He knew him to be not over-scrupulous. He had seen him at Knott Mill Fair and Dirt Fair (so called from its being held in muddy November), or at Kersal Moor Races, with more money to spend in pop, nuts, and gingerbread, shows and merry-go-rounds, flying boats and flying boxes, fighting cocks and fighting men, than he could possibly have saved out of the sum his father allowed him for pocket-money, even if he had been of the saving kind; and, coupling all these things together, Jabez was far from satisfied.

It is also mentioned in a collection of poems by Philip Connell called "Poaching on Parnassus" published in 1865.

Lines to Mr Isaac Holden by Philip Connell on his Drawing of the Prestwich Lunatic Asylum:

And Southward at due distance the huge hive,
Of busy Manchester is all alive,
Its towering chimnies, domes and steeples rise,
In strange confusion thro' the hazy skies;
There Broughton glimmers in the evening sun;
Here Cheetham Hill o'ertops the vapours dun;
There Kersal Moor the same bleak front doth shew,
That met the view Eight hundred years ago,
Where Clunian Monks there with their God did dwell,
Within the precincts of its holy cell.

In 1876 the Lancashire dialect poet and songwriter Edwin Waugh moved from his Manchester home to Kersal Moor for the "fresher air". Waugh's early life was spent in Rochdale and although he worked in Manchester he yearned for the moors he remembered from his youth. He wrote the following poem about Kersal Moor

Kersal Moor

Sweet falls the blackbird's evening song,
in Kersal's poised dell;
But the skylarks trill makes the dewdrops thrill,
In the bonny heather;
Wild and free
Wild and free
Where the moorland breezes blow.

Oft have I roved you craggy steeps,
Where the tinkling moorland rills,
Sing all day long their low sweet song,
To the lonely listening hills;
And croon at night
In the pale moonlight

While mountain breezes blow.

As his health declined, Waugh moved to the seaside town of New Brighton. On his death in 1890, his body was brought back to be buried in the graveyard of St Paul's Church, on the edge of the moorland he loved so well.

...Oh lay me down in moorland ground,

And make it my last bed,
With the heathery wilderness around,
And the bonny lark o'erhead:
Let fern and ling around me cling,
And green moss o'er me creep;
And the sweet wild mountain breezes sing,

Above my slumbers deep. – from The Moorland Breeze, Edwin Waugh (1889)
