= Euclemensia schwarziella =

Scientific classification
- Kingdom: Animalia
- Phylum: Arthropoda
- Class: Insecta
- Order: Lepidoptera
- Family: Cosmopterigidae
- Genus: Euclemensia
- Species: E. schwarziella

Binomial name
- Euclemensia schwarziella Busck, 1901

Species of moth

Euclemensia schwarziella is a moth in the family Cosmopterigidae. It was described by August Busck in 1901. It is found in the US states of Arizona and Texas.

The larvae are parasitoids of scale insects, specifically Kermes and Allokermes species.
