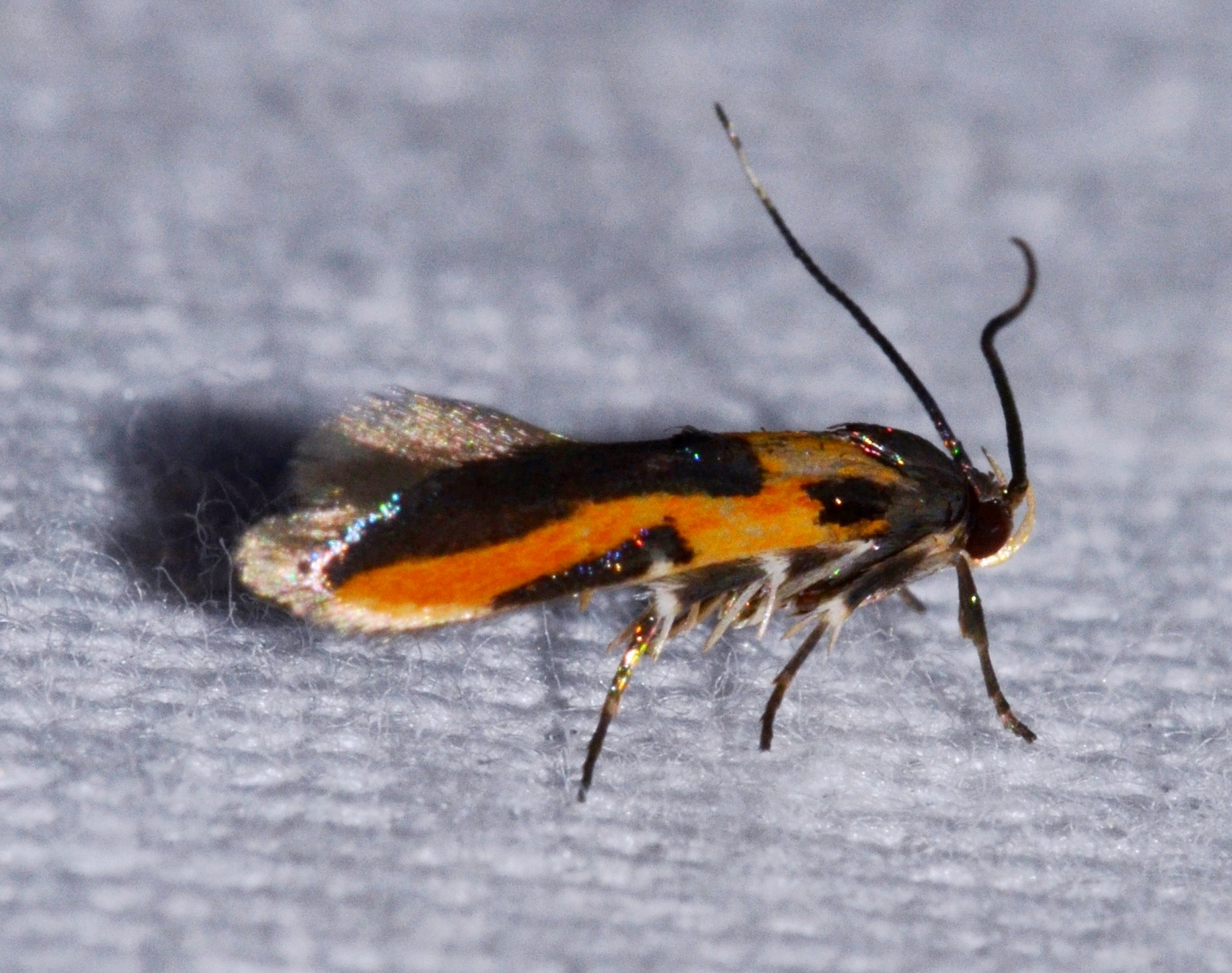
- Euclemensia bassettella

Scientific classification
- Kingdom: Animalia
- Phylum: Arthropoda
- Class: Insecta
- Order: Lepidoptera
- Family: Cosmopterigidae
- Subfamily: Antequerinae
- Genus: Euclemensia; Grote, 1878

Synonyms
- Hamadryas Clemens, 1864 (non Hübner, 1804: preoccupied); Sisyrotarsa Meyrick, 1937

= Euclemensia =

Genus of moths

Euclemensia is a genus of moth in the family Cosmopterigidae.

== Species ==
- Euclemensia bassettella (Clemens, 1864)
- Euclemensia barksdalensis Lee & Brown, 2011
- Euclemensia caminopa (Meyrick, 1937)
- Euclemensia schwarziella Busck, 1901
- Euclemensia woodiella (Curtis, 1830)
