= George Gale House =

George Gale House may refer to:

- George Gale House (Cambridge, Massachusetts), Middlesex County
- George Gale House (Worcester, Massachusetts), Worcester County
