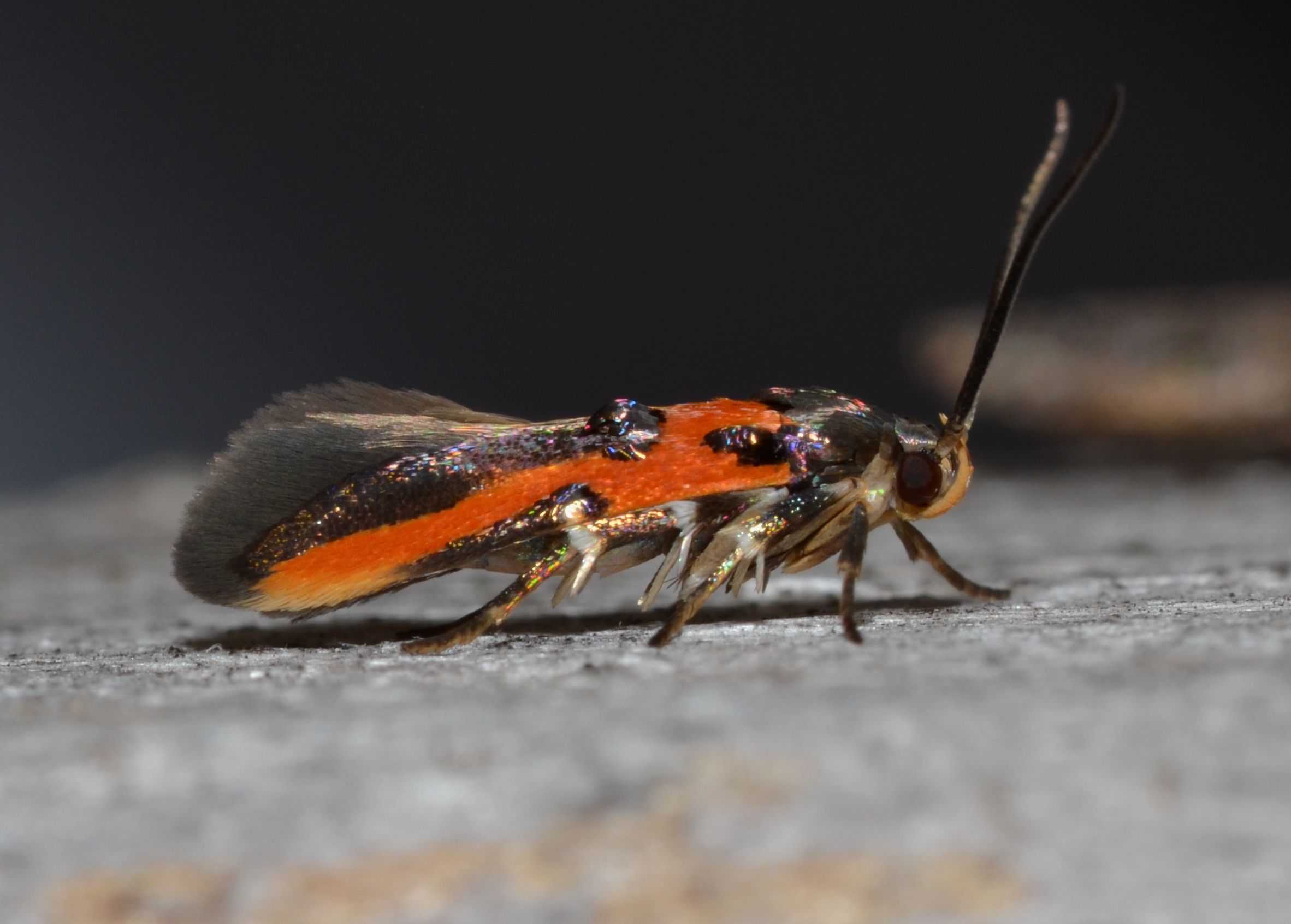

Scientific classification
- Kingdom: Animalia
- Phylum: Arthropoda
- Clade: Pancrustacea
- Class: Insecta
- Order: Lepidoptera
- Family: Cosmopterigidae
- Genus: Euclemensia
- Species: E. bassettella

Binomial name
- Euclemensia bassettella (Clemens, 1864)

Synonyms
- Hamadryas bassettella Clemens, 1864

= Euclemensia bassettella =

Kermes scale moth

Species of moth

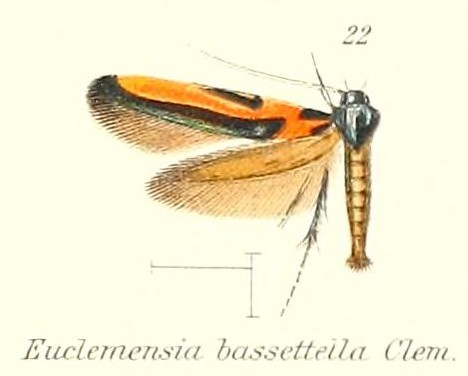
Euclemensia bassettella

Euclemensia bassettella, the kermes scale moth, is a moth in the family Cosmopterigidae. It was described by James Brackenridge Clemens in 1864. It is found in North America in New Hampshire, southern Ontario, Illinois and from Florida to eastern Texas. The species lives on or near oak trees infected with scale insects.

The wingspan is 9–14 millimetres (0.35–0.55 in). Adults have been recorded on wing in February and from April to October.

The larvae parasitize scale insects in the genus Allokermes, and possibly the genera Eriokermes, Nanokermes and Kermes.
