= Roger Aytoun =

British soldier

Major-General} Roger Aytoun
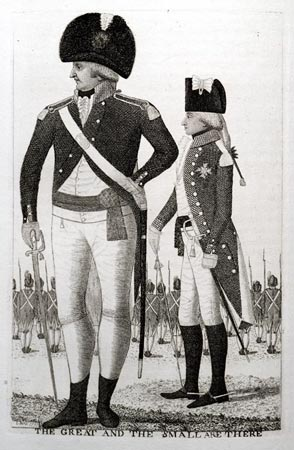
- Aytoun and the Duc d'Angoulême by John Kay, 1797
- Died: 1 October 1810
- Military career
- Allegiance: United Kingdom
- Branch: British Army
- Rank: Major-General
- Conflicts: Great Siege of Gibraltar

Major-General Roger Aytoun was a British Army officer at the Great Siege of Gibraltar who came to notice when he married an ageing widow and was given Hough Hall in Manchester. Aytoun was known as Spanking Roger because of his love of fighting.

== Life ==
Aytoun had the same name as his grandfather. His father was called John and his mother was Isobel and his maternal grandfather was Robert Rollo. Aytoun took part in a race on Kersal Moor which traditionally was done with the competitors running without clothes. The race was run each Whitsun and the spectacle attracted large crowds and entertainers who transformed part of the moor into a giant fair. The sight of Aytoun's six-foot-four inch frame was said to have inspired a Manchester widow, Barbara Minshull, to propose marriage to him. Minshull lived at Chorlton Hall and she also owned Hough Hall and Garret Hall. Her fortune was due to her late husband who had been a successful apothecary. Roger Aytoun was given Hough Hall when they married in 1769.

Aytoun was known to be addicted to both drink and gambling and he married the 65-year-old widow even though he was so inebriated that he needed assistance to stand at the wedding.

Aytoun moved into his new bride's home which was Hough Hall in Moston in Manchester. Having acquired the Chorlton Hall estate by his marriage Aytoun undertook its development in the 1770s when an area between Piccadilly, Portland Street, Princess Street and the River Medlock was laid out and sold.

Aytoun's new bride lived for another fourteen years. He remarried after his first wife died to Jean Sinclair who was the daughter of John Sinclair of Balgregie. He died at Inchdarney on 1 October 1810 and he was succeeded by his son.

== Legacy ==
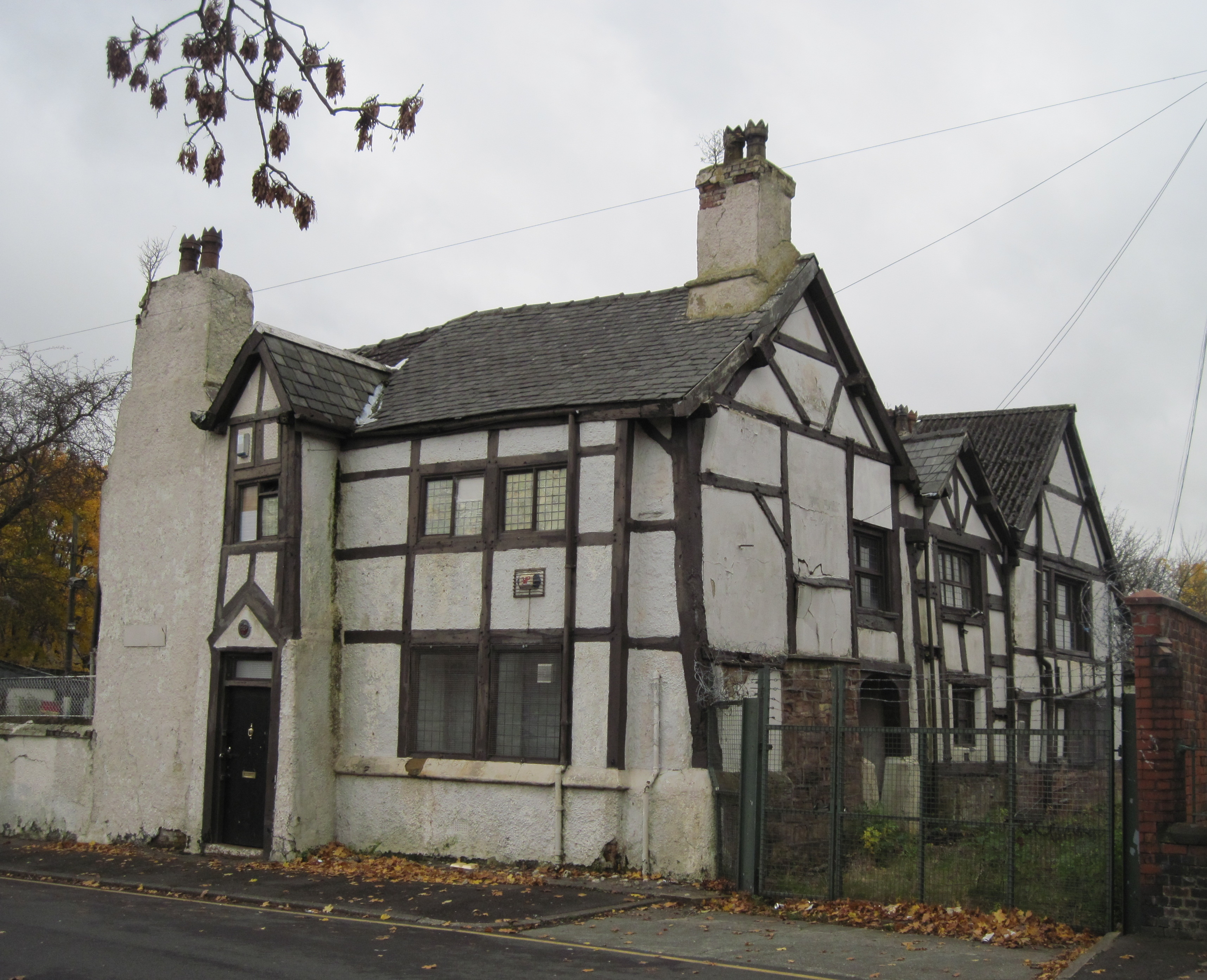
Hough Hall was given to him by his bride

Aytoun spent his fortune but his name is remembered in Aytoun Street in Manchester and there is a pub named the Spanking Roger. His image was captured by John Kay who drew Aytoun beside the future Charles X of France who was a foot shorter than he was.
