= Euclemensia caminopa =

Scientific classification
- Kingdom: Animalia
- Phylum: Arthropoda
- Class: Insecta
- Order: Lepidoptera
- Family: Cosmopterigidae
- Genus: Euclemensia
- Species: E. caminopa

Binomial name
- Euclemensia caminopa (Meyrick, 1937)

Synonyms
- Sisyrotarsa caminopa Meyrick, 1937

Species of moth

Euclemensia caminopa is a moth in the family Cosmopterigidae. It was described by Edward Meyrick in 1937. It is found in Trinidad.
