= Euclemensia barksdalensis =

Scientific classification
- Domain: Eukaryota
- Kingdom: Animalia
- Phylum: Arthropoda
- Class: Insecta
- Order: Lepidoptera
- Family: Cosmopterigidae
- Genus: Euclemensia
- Species: E. barksdalensis

Binomial name
- Euclemensia barksdalensis Lee & Brown, 2011

Species of moth

Euclemensia barksdalensis is a moth in the family Cosmopterigidae. It was described by Lee and Brown in 2011. It is found in Louisiana.

The length of the forewings is 3 millimetres (0.12 in) for females and 4 millimetres (0.16 in) for males. The forewings are dark brown with a postbasal band of yellowish orange scales, extending to the base between two dark brown basal spots. The hindwings are dark brown.

== Etymology ==
The species name is derived from the type locality at Barksdale Air Force Base.
