= Lord Rollo =

Title in the Peerage of Scotland

Arms of the Lord Rollo, Chief of Clan Rollo

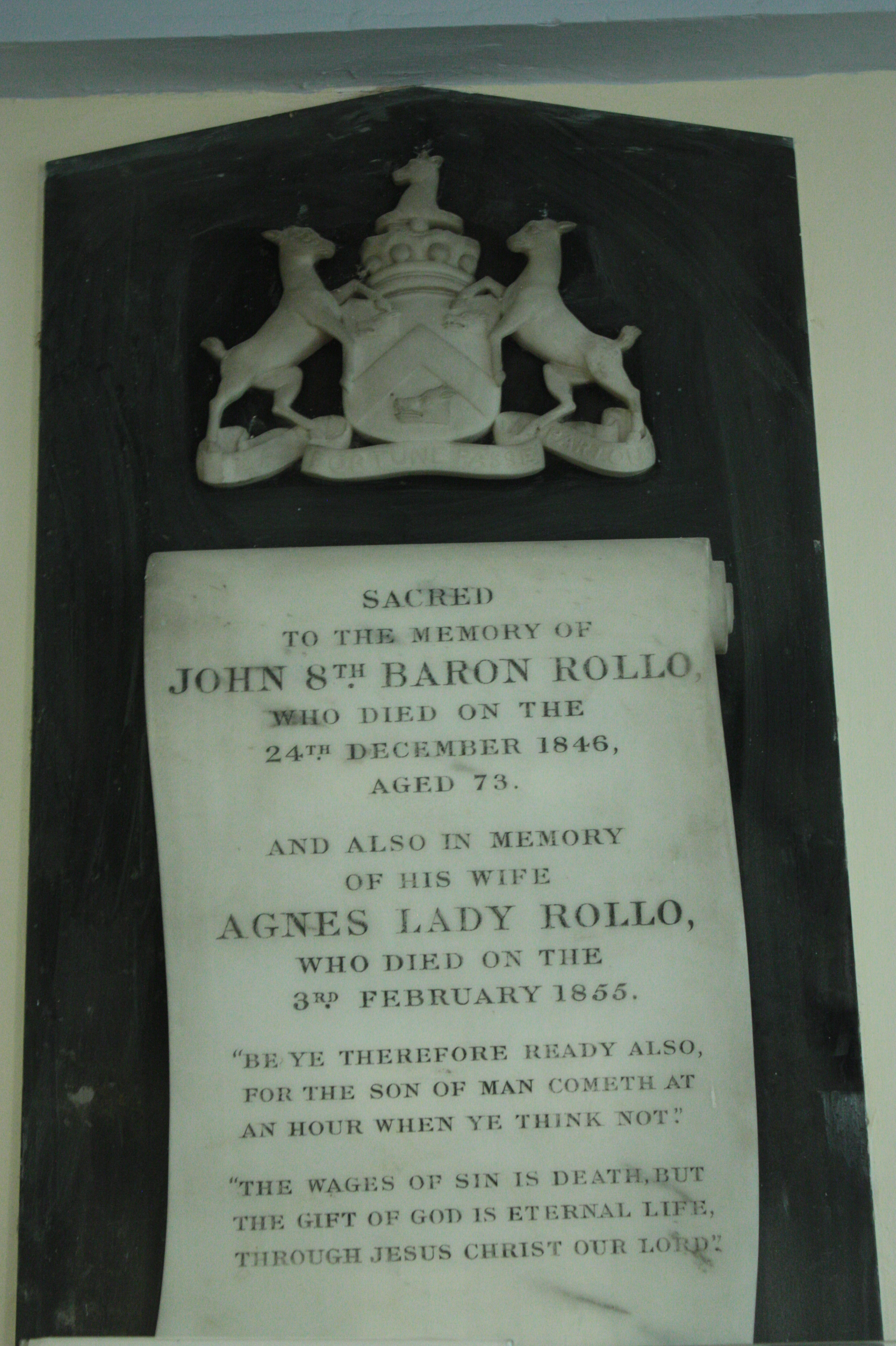
The grave of John 8th Lord Rollo, Dunning

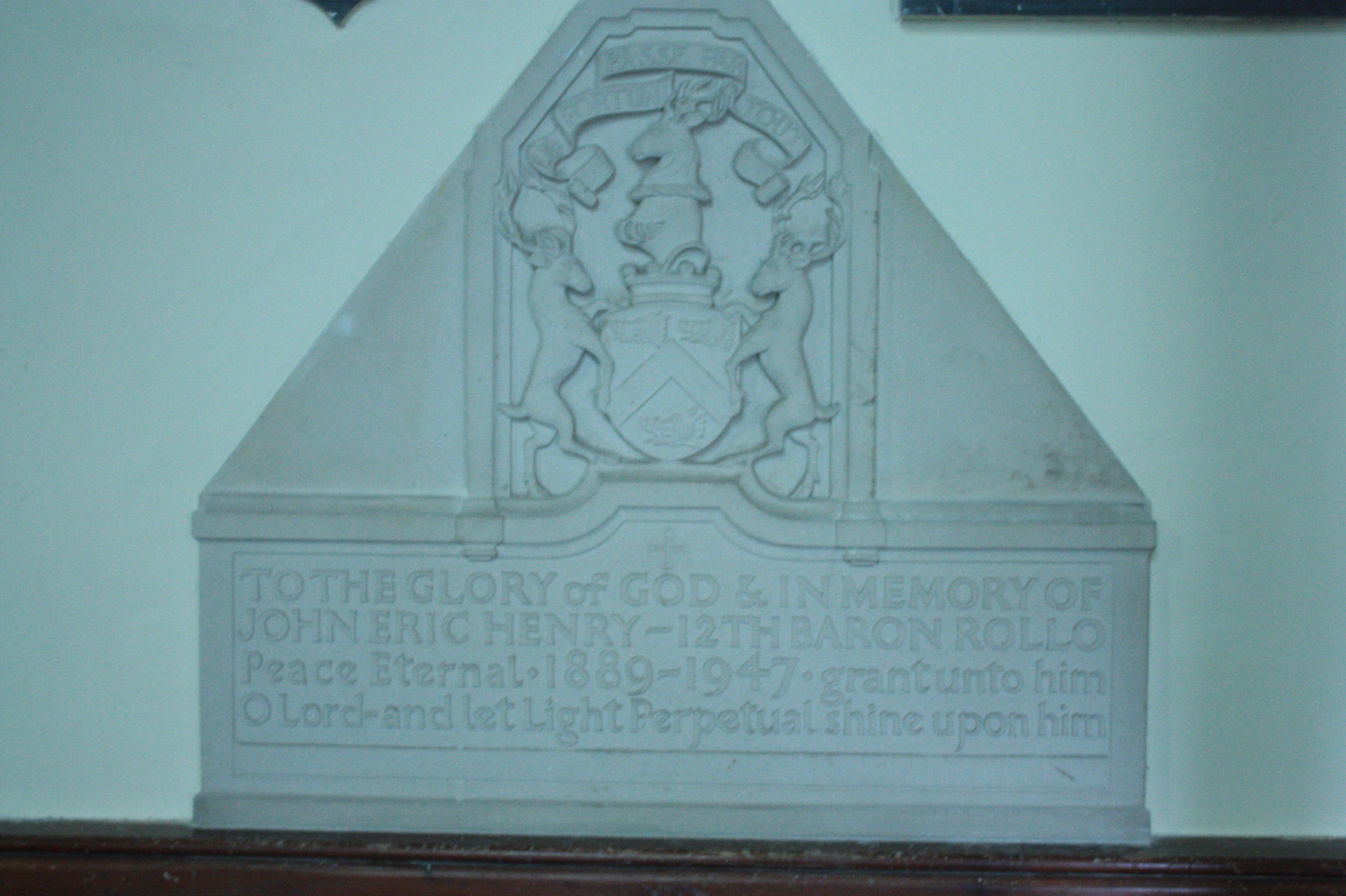
The grave of John Eric Henry Rollo, 12th Lord Rollo, Dunning

Lord Rollo, of Duncrub in the County of Perth, is a title in the Peerage of Scotland. It was created on 10 January 1651 for Sir Andrew Rollo, with remainder to his heirs male whatsoever. His great-great-grandson, the fifth Lord, was a Brigadier-General in the Army and fought in North America during the Seven Years' War. He died without surviving male issue and was succeeded by his younger brother, the sixth Lord. His grandson, the eighth Lord, sat in the House of Lords as a Scottish representative peer from 1841 to 1846. His son, the ninth Lord, was a Scottish Representative Peer from 1847 to 1852. His son, the tenth Lord, sat in the House of Lords as a Scottish Representative Peer from 1860 to 1868. On 29 June 1869 he was created Baron Dunning, of Dunning and Pitcairns in the County of Perth, in the Peerage of the United Kingdom, with remainder to the heirs male of his body. This title gave the Lords an automatic seat in the House of Lords until 1999. As of 2017 the titles are held by the tenth Lord's great-great-grandson, the fourteenth Lord, who succeeded his father in 1997. He is the hereditary Clan Chief of Clan Rollo.

The family seat was Duncrub Castle, near Dunning, Perthshire.

== Lords Rollo (1651) ==
- Andrew Rollo, 1st Lord Rollo (1577–1659)
- James Rollo, 2nd Lord Rollo (1600–1669)
- Andrew Rollo, 3rd Lord Rollo (d. 1700)
- Robert Rollo, 4th Lord Rollo (c. 1680–1758)
- Andrew Rollo, 5th Lord Rollo (c. 1703–1765)
  - John Rollo, Master of Rollo (d. 1762)
- John Rollo, 6th Lord Rollo (1708–1783)
- James Rollo, 7th Lord Rollo (1738–1784)
- John Rollo, 8th Lord Rollo (1773–1846)
- William Rollo, 9th Lord Rollo (1809–1852)
- John Rollo, 10th Lord Rollo, 1st Baron Dunning (1835–1916)
- William Charles Wordsworth Rollo, 11th Lord Rollo, 2nd Baron Dunning (1860–1946)
- John Eric Henry Rollo, 12th Lord Rollo, 3rd Baron Dunning (1889–1947)
- Eric John Stapylton Rollo, 13th Lord Rollo, 4th Baron Dunning (1915–1997)
- David Eric Howard Rollo, 14th Lord Rollo, 5th Baron Dunning (b. 1943)

The heir apparent is the present holder's eldest son, the Hon. James David William Rollo, Master of Rollo (b. 1972).
The heir apparent's heir apparent is his son, Charles James Thomas Rollo (b. 2005)
