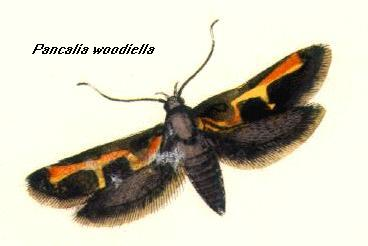
- Manchester moth, painted by John Curtis

Scientific classification
- Domain: Eukaryota
- Kingdom: Animalia
- Phylum: Arthropoda
- Class: Insecta
- Order: Lepidoptera
- Family: Cosmopterigidae
- Genus: Euclemensia
- Species: E. woodiella

Binomial name
- Euclemensia woodiella (Curtis, 1830)

Synonyms
- Pancalia woodiella Curtis, 1830; Schiffermuelleria woodiella (Curtis, 1830); Schiffermulleria woodiella (lapsus)

= Euclemensia woodiella =

Manchester tinea

Species of moth

Euclemensia woodiella, the Manchester tinea (or Manchester moth, since it does not belong to the Tineoidea), is a yellow and brown British moth. It is regarded as extinct, and is known from only three museum specimens, one of which is held by the Manchester Museum, one by the Natural History Museum, London, and the type, which is in the Curtis Collection at Museum Victoria.

At first placed in Pancalia or Schiffermuelleria, in 1864 it was separated in a monotypic genus Hamadryas by Clemens. However, his proposed genus name had already been used in 1806, when J. Hübner gave it to the cracker butterflies; Clemens' name was thus a junior homonym and invalid. To replace it, A.R. Grote in 1878 erected the current genus, Euclemensia, honoring Clemens' effort. This too was monotypic at first, and while the relationships of the Manchester tinea are now difficult to study in sufficient detail to determine if such a separation is appropriate, it does still indicate that a quite distinct and peculiar lineage was lost with the extinction of this moth.

== Discovery ==
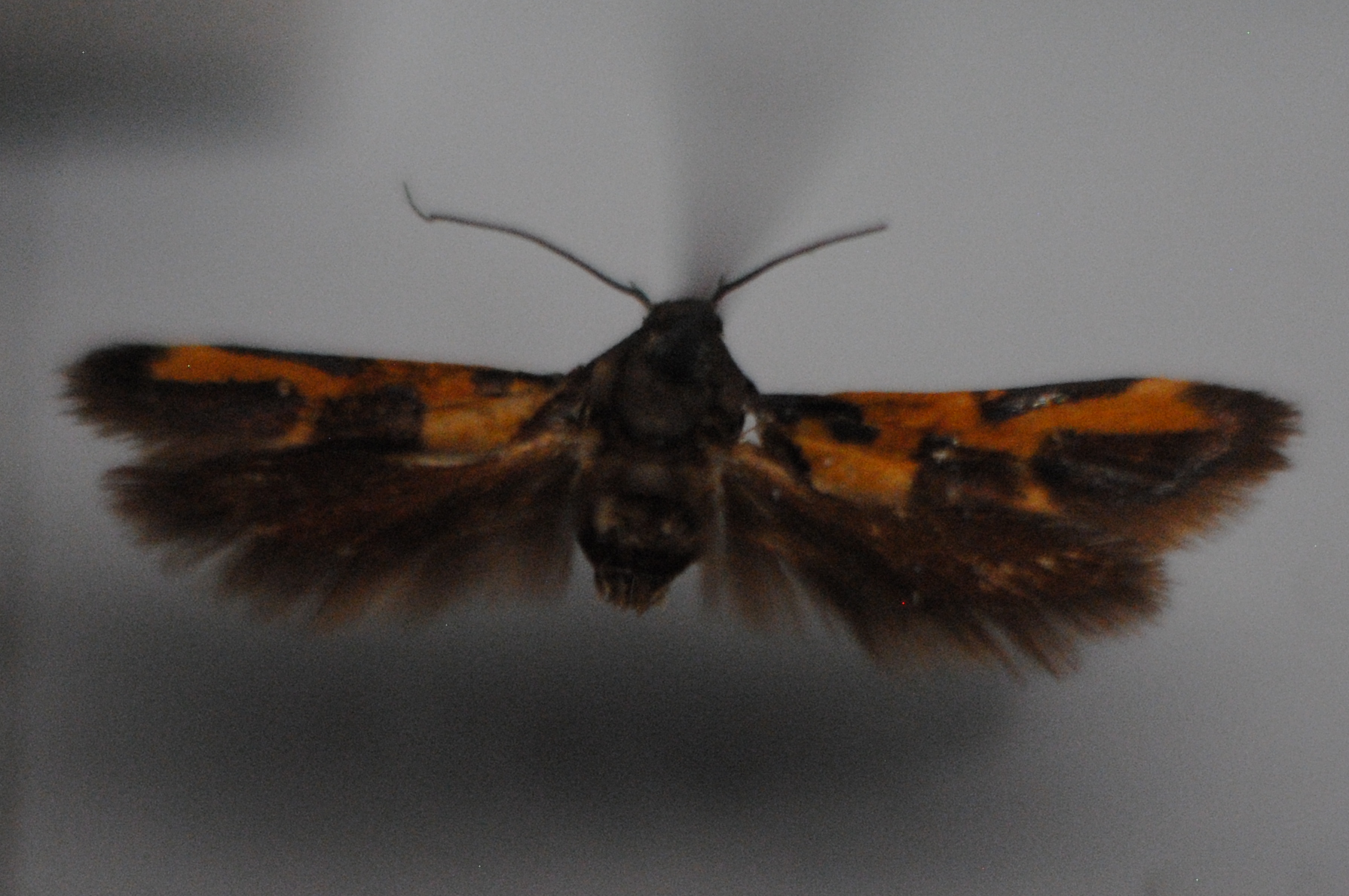
The type specimen, in the Melbourne Museum

In 1829 an amateur insect collector named Robert Cribb collected a series of about fifty small yellow and brown moths from a rotting alder on Kersal Moor in Salford, near Manchester. These turned out to be a previously unknown species of moth, but they were mistakenly attributed to a friend of Cribb's, the collector R. Wood, who had asked the entomologist John Curtis to identify them. The moths were named by Curtis as Pancalia woodiella in Wood's honour.

P. Woodiella Curt. Brit. Ent 304—The only specimen I have seen of this beautiful Moth, which is larger than the others, is a female; it was taken on Kersall-moor the middle of last June by Mr. R. Wood, of Manchester, to whom I have the pleasure of dedicating it;—a most zealous and successful naturalist, to whose liberality I am indebted for many valuable insects.
- John Curtis

Manchester Museum's fragile specimen

Enraged by this, and by accusations of fraudulently passing off foreign moths as British, Cribb gave up collecting and left the rest of the collection with his landlady as security for a debt. Here the stories from Manchester University and The Australian Museum, Victoria differ as to whether it was Cribb's pub landlady or the landlady of his lodgings, but either way the result was the same. The debt was not paid on time and when Cribb went back for the moths, which he had already sold to another collector, his landlady had burnt them. Subsequent efforts by other collectors to find more of the moths were unsuccessful, and the three specimens left in existence are thought to be the only representatives of an extinct species.

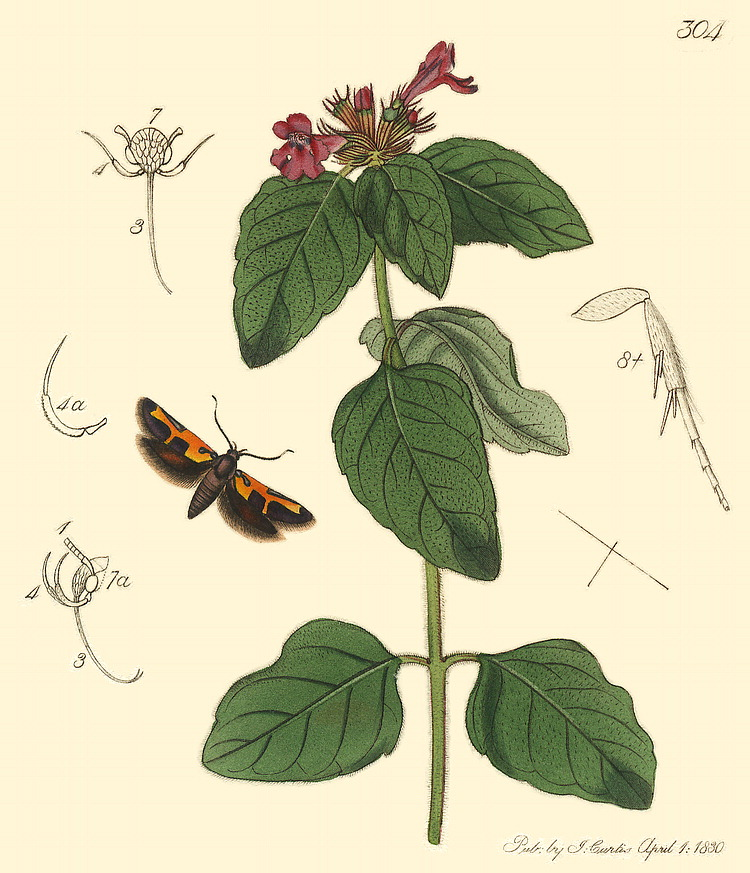
Engraving of adult with anatomical details from John Curtis's British Entomology (1830)
