= Andrew Rollo, 5th Lord Rollo =

British Army officer

Brigadier-General The Right Honourable The Lord Rollo
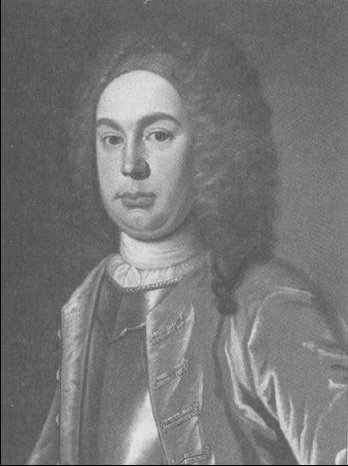
- Portrait, c. 1758
- Born: 18 November 1703; Dunning, Perth and Kinross
- Died: 20 June 1765 (aged 61); Leicester, England
- Burial place: St Margaret's Churchyard, Leicester
- Children: 1 daughter and son
- Military career
- Allegiance: Great Britain
- Branch: British Army
- Service years: 1743–1762
- Conflicts: War of the Austrian Succession Battle of Dettingen

Brigadier-General Andrew Rollo, 5th Lord Rollo (18 November 1703 – 20 June 1765) was a British Army officer who served in the War of the Austrian Succession and Seven Years' War.

== Life ==
Lord Rollo was the son of Robert Rollo (c. 1680–1758) and Mary Roll, daughter to Sir Henry Rollo of Woodside.

He was commissioned into the army at the age of 40 to serve in the War of the Austrian Succession. He fought at the Battle of Dettingen in 1743, being promoted to major in June 1750, and by 1756 he commanded the 22nd Regiment of Foot.

=== Seven Years' War ===
During the 7 Years War, he was fighting since 1757 for the British in the Americas. He saw action in New York, Cape Breton Island, Sorel, and Montreal. He led the Île Saint-Jean Campaign, which resulted in the capture of Prince Edward Island in 1758 and deportation of the French Acadians there. A bay on the island is still named after him. In 1760, he was raised to the rank of brigadier general.

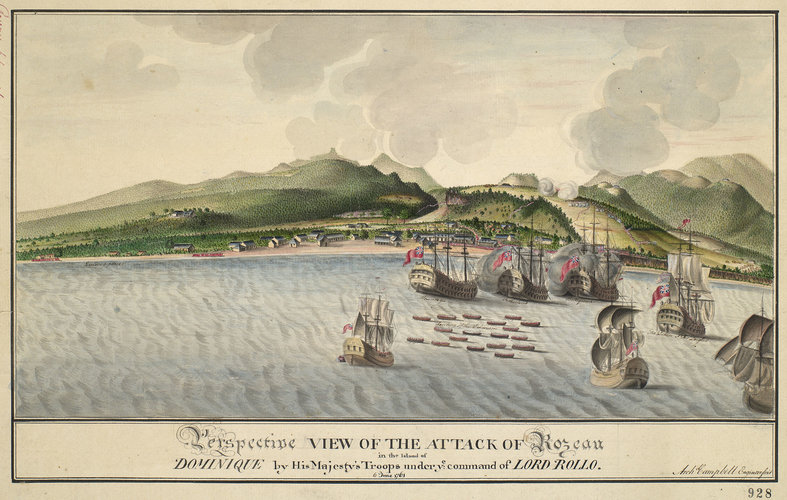
HMS Dublin (far right), Rollos's flagship at Roseau, Dominica on 6 June 1761

On 3 May 1761, he sailed with his regiment from New York to the West Indies where he commanded the land forces at the attack on the French settlement of Roseau on 6 June, which he took with a force of only 2,500 men. After the capture, he was made Commander-in-Chief of Dominica before the island was definitely ceded to Britain by the terms of the Treaty of Paris in 1763. During this period, he took a prominent part in the British capture of Martinique and in the British expedition against Cuba in 1762.

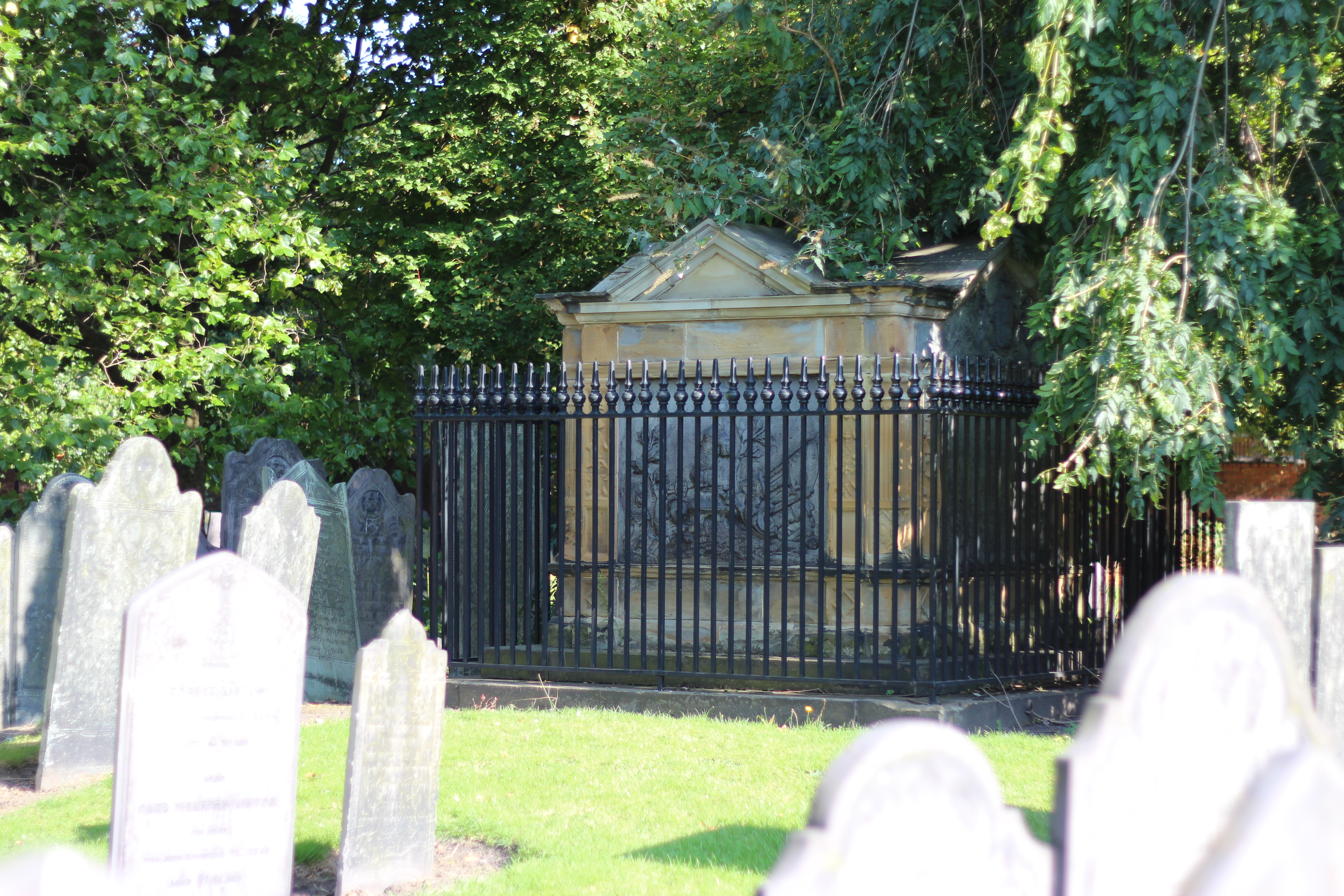
Lord Rollo's tomb at St Margaret's Church in Leicester

His health was severely affected by the climate, and he returned to England in 1762, dying at Leicester in 1765. He was interred at St Margaret's church in that city.

== Marriage and issue ==
He married on 24 April 1727, with Catherine Murray (died 28 July 1763), daughter of Lord James Murray, and had 2 children:

- Anna Rollo (1729–1746)
- John Rollo, Master of Rollo (1736–1762)

He remarried on 16 February 1765 to Elizabeth Moray and died 4 months later.

As his only son had died before him, he was succeeded by his brother John Rollo.

== Legacy ==
On Dominica, his name was given to Rollo's Head which had been called Pointe Ronde by the French, but the French name is still more commonly used today. His name was also given to Rollo Street in what was to be the British capital of Dominica at Portsmouth, and this street name still survives. Rollo Bay, Prince Edward Island is also named after him.

Peerage of Scotland
Preceded by Robert Rollo	Lord Rollo; 1758–1765	Succeeded by John Rollo
