= George Gale House (Cambridge, Massachusetts) =

Historic house in Massachusetts, United States

- U.S. National Register of Historic Places
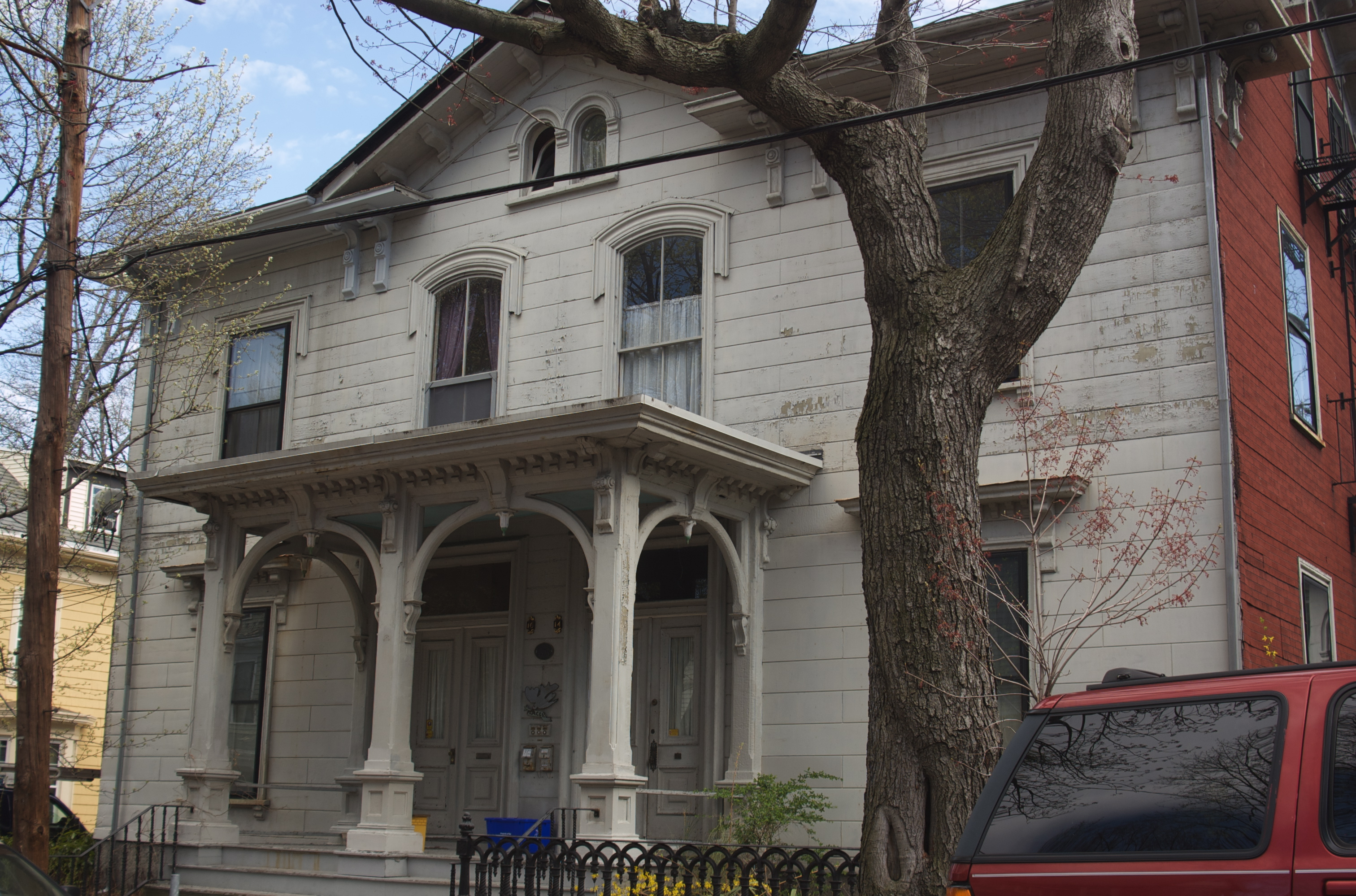

- Location within Massachusetts Location within the United States
- Location: 14–16 Clinton Street, Cambridge, Massachusetts
- Coordinates: 42°22′06.3″N 71°06′20.8″W
- Built: 1853
- Architectural style: Italianate
- MPS: Cambridge MRA
- NRHP reference No.: 87002543
- Added to NRHP: February 10, 1988

The George Gale House is a historic double house in Cambridge, Massachusetts. The three-story frame house was built in 1858 by father and son, George T. Gale and George ?. Gale. They owned a lumberyard together in Kendall Square. The building at 14-16 Clinton Street is unusual as a double house in the Italianate style. It has typical Italianate features, including a central gable on the front facade, an elaborately decorated front porch and deep eaves with brackets all around. It is distinctively sheathed in flushboarding, giving the appearance of stone.

The house was listed on the National Register of Historic Places in 1988 to preserve the existing structure and in recognition of the innovative practices of the Gales. Their lumberyard, located in Kendall Square was the first to bring a spur of the rail system into the lumberyard to facilitate delivery of lumber at a time when Cambridge was growing.

== See also ==
- National Register of Historic Places listings in Cambridge, Massachusetts
