= Robert Rollo, 4th Lord Rollo =

Scottish nobleman and Jacobite

Robert Rollo, 4th Lord Rollo (12 June 1679 – 8 March 1758) was a Scottish nobleman and Jacobite.

== Life ==
Lord Rollo was the son of Andrew Rollo, 3rd Lord Rollo and his wife Margaret Balfour, daughter to John Balfour, 3rd Lord Balfour of Burleigh.

He took his seat as a commissioner to the Parliament of Scotland from 1703, and was a commissioner of supply in 1702 and 1704. In 1707 he voted for the Act of Union. Following the death of Queen Anne, and the subsequent succession of the Hanoverian George I. Lord Rollo took an active part in the Jacobite rising of 1715. Despite the opposition of the Earl of Mar, Rollo was placed in charge of the Perthshire squadron of the Jacobite army, and fought at the Battle of Sheriffmuir in November 1715, but surrendered to government forces the following February. He was imprisoned at Inverness Castle, then Edinburgh Castle until 1717 when he was pardoned.

Lord Rollo died at Duncrub, Perthshire on 8 March 1758

== Marriage and issue ==
Lord Rollo married on 4 June 1702 Mary Rollo, daughter of Sir Henry Rollo of Woodside and had issue:

- Andrew Rollo, 5th Lord Rollo
- Henry Rollo (1705–1745)
- John Rollo, 6th Lord Rollo
- James Rollo (1713–1732)
- Clement Sobieski Rollo (1720–1762)
- William Rollo (1729–1744)
- Mary Rollo (1709–1739)
- Jean Rollo (1717–1780)
- Isobel Rollo (1718–1751) was the mother of Roger Aytoun.

Peerage of Scotland
Preceded by Andrew Rollo	Lord Rollo; 1700–1758	Succeeded by Andrew Rollo
