= George Albert Gale =

American painter

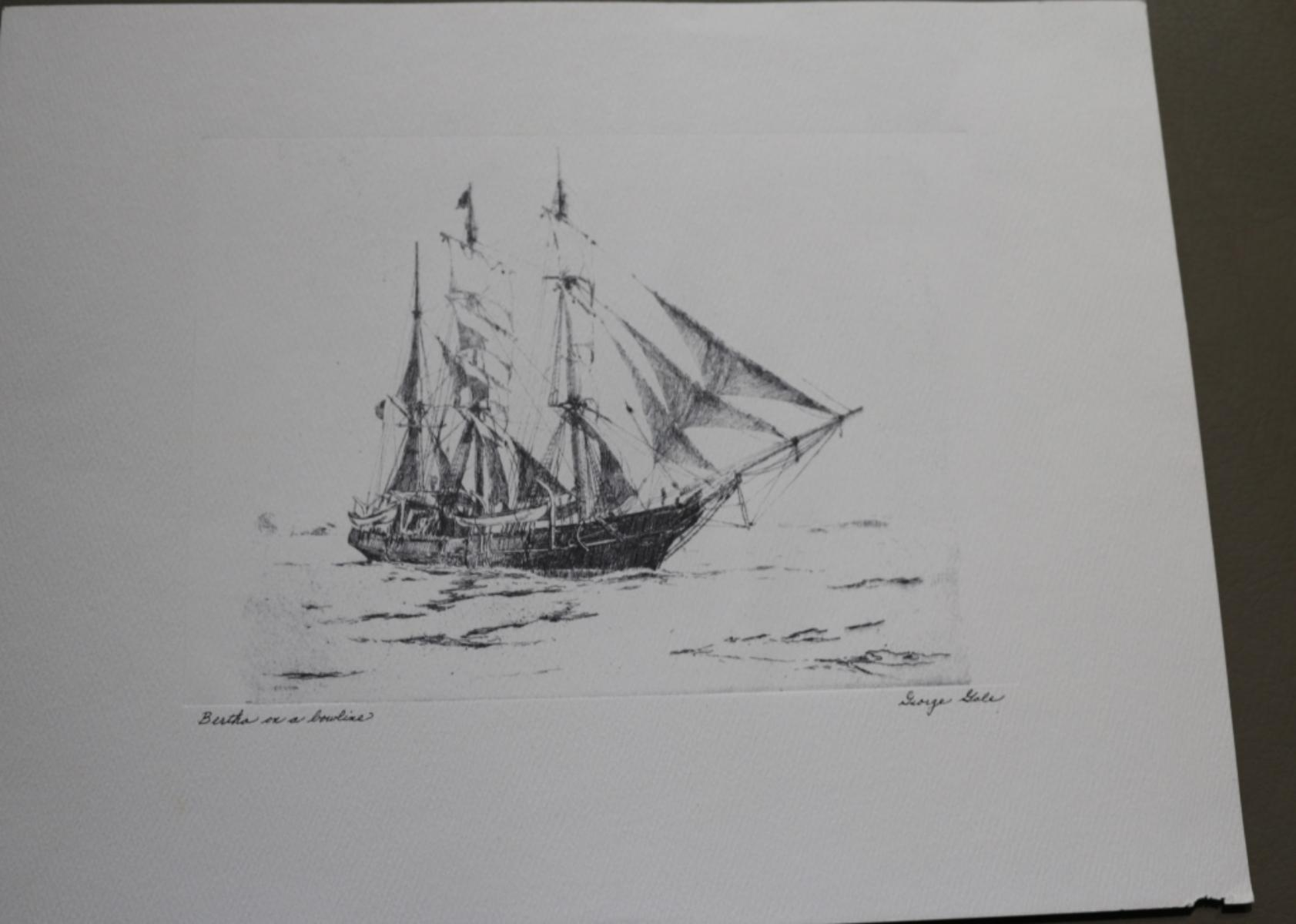
Example of Gale’s work

George Albert Gale (1893–1951) was an American artist, shipbuilder, and sailor who painted nautical scenes and created nautical-themed etchings.
