= George Gale (aeronaut) =

English stage performer and balloonist

George Burcher Gale (1797?–1850) was an English stage performer and balloonist.

== Early life ==
Gale was, according to the register of his burial, born about 1797. He was originally an actor in small parts in London minor theatres. He became a great favourite of Andrew Ducrow. In 1831 he played Mazeppa at the Bowery Theatre in New York City. He afterwards brought six Native Americans, with their chief, "Ma Caust", to London. They were exhibited at the Victoria Theatre till their popularity declined. Sir Augustus Frederick D'Este had become interested in them, and procured Gale an appointment as coast blockade inspector in the north of Ireland. On the strength of this appointment, which he held for seven years, he afterwards assumed the title of lieutenant.

== Ballooning ==
Tiring of this he made an unsuccessful attempt to return to the London stage, and then took to ballooning. He had a balloon manufactured at the old Montpelier Gardens in Walworth, and made his first ascent successfully from the Rosemary Branch tavern at Peckham in 1848. He made many ascents, the 114th of which was from the hippodrome of Vincennes at Bordeaux, with the Royal Cremorne balloon, on 8 September 1850. He was seated on the back of a pony suspended from the car. Gale descended at Auguilles. When the pony had been released from its slings, the peasants holding the balloon ropes, not understanding his directions, relaxed their hold, and Gale was carried up by the only partially exhausted machine. The car overturned, but he clung to the tackling for a time, and was borne out of sight. Next morning his body was found in a wood several miles away. He was buried at the Protestant cemetery at Bordeaux on 11 September. Gale was a man of much courage and very sanguine. For some time after his death his widow, who had frequently made ascents in his company, continued to gain a livelihood by ballooning. His son Thomas Gale also became famous in Australia for his ballooning.
