= Bohun family =

English noble family of the late Middle Ages

House of Bohun
- Nobility
- Arms of de Bohun: Azure, a bend argent cotised or between six lions rampant or.
- Country: Normandy; England
- Place of origin: Cotentin Peninsula, Normandy
- Founder: Humphrey with the Beard (English branch)
- Final ruler: Humphrey de Bohun, 7th Earl of Hereford
- Historic seat: Pleshey Castle; Trowbridge Castle; Caldicot Castle
- Titles: Constable of England; Earl of Hereford; Earl of Essex; Earl of Northampton; Duchess of Gloucester; Countess of Devon; Baron of Trowbridge; Lord of Brecknock; Lord of the manor of Bohun; Marcher lord High Sheriff of Rutland; Sheriff of Gloucester; Ecclesiastical: Bishop of Salisbury; Bishop of Bath; Bishop of Bath and Glastonbury; Abbot of Corbeil
- Dissolution: 1373 (paternal line)

The de Bohun then Bohun family is an English noble family of Norman origin that played a prominent role in English political and military history during the Late Middle Ages. The swan used by the family and their descendants as a heraldic badge came to be called the Bohun swan.

Humphrey with the Beard (died c. 1113), who founded the English family, held the manor of Bohun (or Bohon) in Normandy – on the Cotentin Peninsula between Coutances and the estuary of the Vire. This is still reflected in place names such as Saint-André-de-Bohon and Saint-Georges-de-Bohon. From one son of Humphrey with the same name, the male line continued, becoming Earls of Hereford, Essex and Northampton, using the name Humphrey repeatedly in successive generations. The male line of another son of Humphrey with the Beard, Richard de Meri, died out in the 12th century, but his heirs in the female line took the surname of Bohun, giving rise to the Bohuns of Midhurst in West Sussex.

- Humphrey with the Beard (died c. 1113)
  - Richard de Meri
    - Richard de Bohun
      - Richard de Bohun (d. 1179), Bishop of Coutances
      - Josceline de Bohon (c. 1111 – 1184), Bishop of Salisbury
        - Reginald Fitz Jocelin (d. 1191), Bishop of Bath, Archbishop of Canterbury-elect
    - Muriel, married Savaric Fitzcana of Midhurst
      - Geldewin
        - Franco de Bohun, ancestor of the Bohuns of Midhurst
        - Savaric FitzGeldewin (d. 1205), Bishop of Bath
  - Humphrey I de Bohun (died c. 1123), married Maud, daughter of Edward of Salisbury
    - Humphrey II de Bohun (died 1164/5), married Margaret, daughter of Miles of Gloucester
      - Humphrey III de Bohun (died 1181), married Margaret of Huntingdon
        - Henry de Bohun, 1st Earl of Hereford (1176–1220), a Norman-English nobleman
          - Humphrey de Bohun, 2nd Earl of Hereford and 1st Earl of Essex (Humphrey IV, c. 1204 – 1275), Constable of England
            - Humphrey V de Bohun (d. 1265), fought on the side of the rebellious barons in the Barons' War
              - Humphrey de Bohun, 3rd Earl of Hereford and 2nd Earl of Essex (Humphrey VI, c. 1249 – c. 1298), a key figure in the Norman conquest of Wales
                - Humphrey de Bohun, 4th Earl of Hereford, 3rd Earl of Essex (Humphrey VII, 1276–1321/2), one of the Ordainers who opposed Edward II's excesses
                  - Eleanor de Bohun, Countess of Ormonde (1304–1363)
                  - John de Bohun, 5th Earl of Hereford, 4th Earl of Essex (1306–1336)
                  - Humphrey de Bohun, 6th Earl of Hereford, 5th Earl of Essex (Humphrey VIII, 1309–1361), Lord High Constable of England
                  - Margaret de Bohun, Countess of Devon (1311–1391)
                  - William de Bohun, 1st Earl of Northampton, KG (c. 1312 – 1360); English nobleman and military commander at the Battle of Crécy
                    - Humphrey de Bohun, 7th Earl of Hereford, 6th Earl of Essex, 2nd Earl of Northampton (Humphrey IX, 1342–1373), an English noble during the reign of King Edward III
                      - Eleanor de Bohun (c. 1366 – 1399); elder daughter and co-heiress
                      - Mary de Bohun (c. 1368 – 1394); younger daughter, the first wife of King Henry IV of England and mother of King Henry V
                    - Elizabeth de Bohun, Countess of Arundel and Surrey (c. 1350 – 1385)
              - Henry de Bohun (d. 1314), English knight killed by Robert I of Scotland at Bannockburn.

== See also ==
- Bohun (disambiguation)
