= Pleshey =

Village in Essex, England

Coordinates: 51.805°N 0.411°E

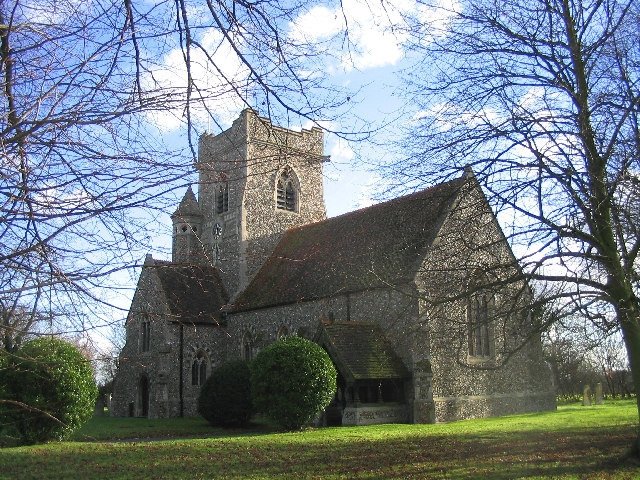
- Holy Trinity Church, Pleshey (Photo taken from Holy Trinity Church Facebook page)

- Location within Essex
- Population: 307 (Parish, 2021)
- OS grid reference: TL665145
- District: Chelmsford
- Shire county: Essex
- Region: East
- Country: England
- Sovereign state: United Kingdom
- Post town: Chelmsford
- Postcode district: CM3
- Dialling code: 01245
- Police: Essex
- Fire: Essex
- Ambulance: East of England
- UK Parliament: West Chelmsford

Pleshey is a historic village and civil parish in the Chelmsford district of Essex, England, 6 miles (10 km) north-west of Chelmsford itself. At the 2021 census the parish had a population of 307.

The Normans built a motte-and-bailey castle in the late 11th century; the motte is one of the largest of its kind in Great Britain. It was besieged several times during the Barons' Wars and rebellions in the 13th century.

== History ==
William the Conqueror gave Pleshey, in the parish of High Easter (southwest of Braintree), to Geoffrey de Mandeville. At Pleshey, Mandeville built his caput (centre of administration and main home) of the many villages in Essex given to him by the king. Later, his grandson, another Geoffrey, was made Earl of Essex by King Stephen.

For a long time, Pleshey Castle was an important place in English history. Through inheritance, Pleshey Castle became the main castle of Henry de Bohun, 1st Earl of Hereford, and his wife, Maud, sister and heiress of William de Mandeville, Earl of Essex. From this marriage de Bohun's son Humphrey became Earl of Essex (27 Aug 1236) as well as Earl of Hereford and Hereditary Constable of England. Generations of de Bohuns resided here, with Pleshey as their caput manor. Humphrey de Bohun VIII (4th Earl of Hereford and 3rd of Essex (1275?-1322) on 14 Nov. 1302 married Elizabeth, the daughter of Edward I, King of England. Some of their children were born at Pleshey. Humphrey VIII was killed at the Battle of Boroughbridge in 1322, rebelling against King Edward II.

In 1327, Pleshey Castle became the primary residence of Humphrey VIII's eldest surviving son, John de Bohun, created Earl of Hereford and Essex. He died in 1336 without an heir and the castle passed to his brother, Humphrey IX, Earl of Hereford and Essex (d. 1361). The youngest of the brothers, William de Bohun (d. 1360), became the leading commander of the early part of the Hundred Years War, devising the tactics that won English victories at the Battle of Morlaix (1342), the Battle of Crecy (1346), and the Siege of Calais (1347), and was created Earl of Northampton.

Humphrey IX never married and Pleshey was inherited in 1361 by William's son and heir, Humphrey de Bohun X (b. 1342), last male heir of the direct line. This Humphrey inherited both his uncle's and his father's titles and became Earl of Hereford, Essex, and Northampton. His only heirs at his death on 13 January 1373 were two young daughters, Eleanor and Mary.

Between 1361 and 1384 a group of Augustinian friars created the de Bohun manuscripts at Pleshey Castle; eleven books, one of them a Psalter, celebrating Mary de Bohun's marriage to Henry Bolingbroke, the future Henry IV, King of England. The Mary de Bohun Psalter is now in the Fitzwilliam Museum. Mary, who died before her husband became king, was the mother of Henry V, of Agincourt fame.

The castle then passed (through the marriage of Eleanor) to Thomas of Woodstock, Duke of Gloucester, the youngest son of Edward III. His nephew, Richard II, outraged by his uncle's opposition, had him arrested at Pleshey and taken to France. Two years later the Duke of Exeter was taken to Pleshey Castle and executed for plotting against the king.

Pleshey Castle is mentioned in Shakespeare's play Richard II, in which Thomas of Woodstock's widow asks for a visit from Edmund of York:

Bid him – O, what?
With all good speed at Plashy visit me.
Alack, and what shall good old York there see,
But empty lodgings and unfurnished walls,
Unpeopled offices, untrodden stones?

(Richard II, Act 1, Scene 2, Lines 65–69)

== Pleshey Castle ==
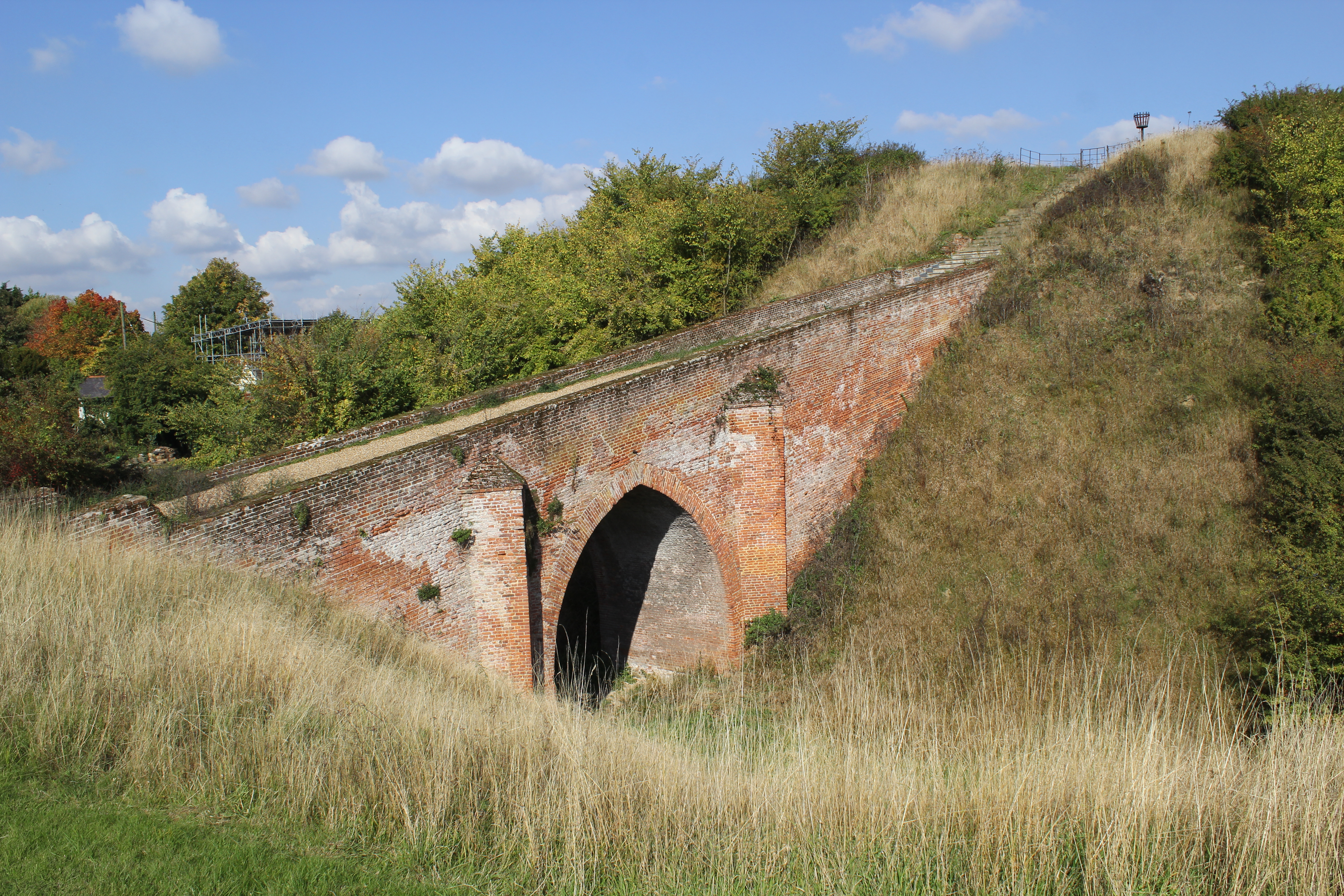
The motte and 15th-century brick bridge at Pleshey Castle

Pleshey Castle's earliest documentary reference dates from 1143, but archaeological excavation has shown that the castle was most likely completed between 1096 and 1106. It was a motte and bailey castle, which consisted of a wooden palisade and tower on a high man-made hill (motte) surrounded by two baileys (castle yard or ward) from its inception, and which at some time in the castle's early history was surrounded by a moat. The earthworks of the motte and south bailey are still extant and intact, whilst the outline of the north bailey (levelled in the 13th century and now buried beneath the modern village) can still be seen in the semi-circular street plan of the village.

The motte at Pleshey dates from c.1100, is about 15 metres high, and is one of the largest mottes in England. The medieval earthworks themselves have survived intact due to them having never been rebuilt in stone.

The castle was dismantled in 1158 when Henry II returned the de Mandeville lands to Geoffrey III, but was subsequently rebuilt in 1167 by William II de Mandeville, which was completed following the same plan as before yet including a massively enlarged rampart enclosing the south bailey.

During the civil war that followed King John's rejection of Magna Carta, Pleshey Castle was seized by a detachment of the king's army on Christmas Eve of 1215, then subsequently recaptured by the rebel barons in the winter of 1216/7. On both occasions, it surrendered without a siege. Obsolete and demonstrably indefensible against a major attack, it became the main residence of the de Bohun family in 1227/8.

Archaeological excavation has found: a chapel at the west end of the south bailey; the hall with its adjoining kitchen, pantry and buttery to the east; storehouses ranged around a kitchen yard accessible from the main gate to the north of the hall; a range of large private chambers (or 'revealing chambers' i.e. audience chambers) above a wardrobe and other storerooms to the west of the hall, which dates to 1421–1483 when the castle became part of the Duchy of Lancaster's estate); and a stone-built gatehouse at the south end of the bridge, the upper room of which can be identified as the Queen's chamber in building accounts (occupied by Eleanor de Bohun). The completion of these buildings has been dated to the late 14th century and are attributed to the de Bohuns and Thomas of Woodstock, 1st Duke of Gloucester.

The keep's great hall has also been located, whilst other ranges are thought to represent 'en suite' accommodation, each with their own fireplace and privy. That next to the high end of the hall would originally have been that of the lord and lady.

By the mid-15th century, the building accounts describe the great hall as the "stranger's hall", suggesting that the keep may have become guest accommodation. This could be because it was replaced in function; evidence of facility duplication exists with late-medieval halls present in both the keep and the south bailey.

The final renovation of the keep was carried out on the orders of Margaret of Anjou, wife of Henry VI, in 1458–1459, where the keep is referred to as a "tower" and was mainly built from the timber of at least 29 oaks, finished in flint, and later brick, facades. This renovation was completed by the building of the brick bridge over the moat between 1477–1480.

Pleshey Castle decayed and became derelict by the mid-16th century, with the motte then used as a rabbit warren; the extant bridge only survives as it was recommended by the Duchy of Lancaster's surveyors to be retained to offer access to this warren.

The castle was sold by Queen Elizabeth I in 1559. Most of the masonry was dismantled for building material in 1629 leaving just the earthworks of the motte and outer baileys.

== Village ==
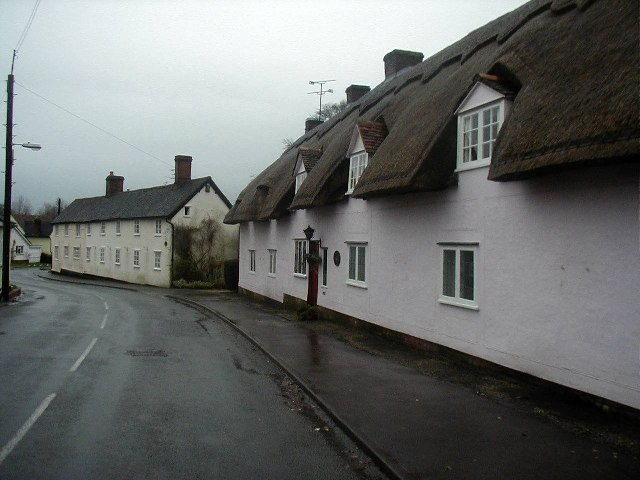
Thatched houses in Pleshey

Although the village has traditionally been an agricultural community, many modern residents are commuters. Pleshey still has a village hall, playing field, tennis court and children's play area but the local shop and post office have closed. The attractive appearance of the village and the castle draws many visitors, especially in the summer months.

== Chelmsford Diocesan House of Retreat ==
Pleshey is home to the Chelmsford Diocesan House of Retreat, which was the first diocesan retreat house in England.

In 1906, the site originally began as an Anglican convent for the Congregation of the Servants of Christ, and in 1909 the house was established as a place of prayer and stillness. The Chelmsford Diocese initially rented the convent as a retreat house for £82 per year, until in 1927, the Diocesan Mission Society (with a loan from the Diocesan Board of Finance) bought the property, to formally establish England's first diocesan retreat house.

Under wardens like Lucy Menzies and prominent retreat conductors such as the mystic and writer Evelyn Underhill, the house gained widespread popularity and a deep spiritual reputation. In 1933, a new chapel was built and dedicated to the Blessed Virgin Mary, St Nicolas, and All Saints by the Bishop of Chelmsford

== Parish Church ==
The parish church, the Church of the Holy Trinity, retains some arches from the former chapel founded in 1394, but was otherwise totally rebuilt in 1868. It is a Grade II* listed building.

== Public House ==
The 19th-century Leather Bottle Public House is Grade II listed and sits in a group of other listed houses.

== See also ==
- The Hundred Parishes

== Bibliography ==
- Bigelow, M. M. “The Bohun Wills” I. American Historical Review (v.I, 1896). 415-41, v.II (1897). 631-649.
- Cokayne, G. (ed. by V. Gibbs). Complete Peerage of England, Scotland, Ireland, Great Britain and the United Kingdom. London:1887-1896. Vols. II, V, VI, IX: Bohun, Essex, Hereford, & Northampton.
- Dictionary of National Biography. Vol II: Bohun. London and Westminster.
