= Robert Devereux =

Robert Devereux may refer to:

- Robert Devereux, 2nd Earl of Essex (1565–1601), favourite of Queen Elizabeth I, executed for treason
- Robert Devereux, 3rd Earl of Essex (1591–1646), son of the above
- Robert Devereux, 16th Viscount Hereford (1843–1930), English peer
- Robert Devereux, 17th Viscount Hereford (1865–1952)
- Robert Devereux, 18th Viscount Hereford (1932–2004)
- Roberto Devereux, an 1837 opera by Donizetti
- Robert Devereux (rugby union) (1897–1974), American rugby union player
- Robert Devereux (civil servant) (born 1957), British civil servant
- Robbie Devereux (born 1971), English footballer

== See also ==
- Devereux (surname)
