= Earl of Essex =

Title in the Peerage of England

Earldom of Essex
- Arms of Capell, Earl of Essex: Gules, a lion rampant, between three cross crosslets fitcheeé or
- Creation date: 1139 (first creation); 1199 (second creation); 1239 (third creation); 1376 (fourth creation); 1461 (fifth creation); 1540 (sixth creation); 1543 (forfeit 1553–59) (seventh creation); 1572 (eighth creation); 1661 (ninth creation)
- Created by: Stephen (first creation); John (second creation); Henry III (third creation); Edward III (fourth creation); Edward IV (fifth creation); Henry VIII (sixth creation); Henry VIII (seventh creation); Elizabeth I (seventh creation, restoration); Elizabeth I (eighth creation); Charles II (ninth creation)
- Peerage: Peerage of England
- First holder: Geoffrey de Mandeville, 1st Earl of Essex
- Present holder: Paul Capell, 11th Earl of Essex (ninth creation)
- Heir presumptive: William Jennings Capell
- Subsidiary titles: Viscount Malden; Baron Capell of Hadham
- Former seat: Cassiobury House
- Motto: Fide et fortitudine (By faith and fortitude)

Earl of Essex is a title in the Peerage of England which was first created in the 12th century by King Stephen. The title has been recreated eight times from its original inception, beginning with a new first earl upon each new creation. The most well-known Earls of Essex were Thomas Cromwell (c. 1485 – 1540) (sixth creation), chief minister to King Henry VIII, Sir William Parr (1513-1571) who was brother to Queen Catherine Parr who was the sixth wife of King Henry VIII, and Robert Devereux, 2nd Earl of Essex (1565–1601) (eighth creation), a favourite of Queen Elizabeth I who led Essex's Rebellion in 1601.

The current holder of the earldom is Paul Capell, 11th Earl of Essex (born 1944), a retired school teacher from Caton, Lancashire.

The family seat was Cassiobury House, near Watford, Hertfordshire.

== Early creations ==
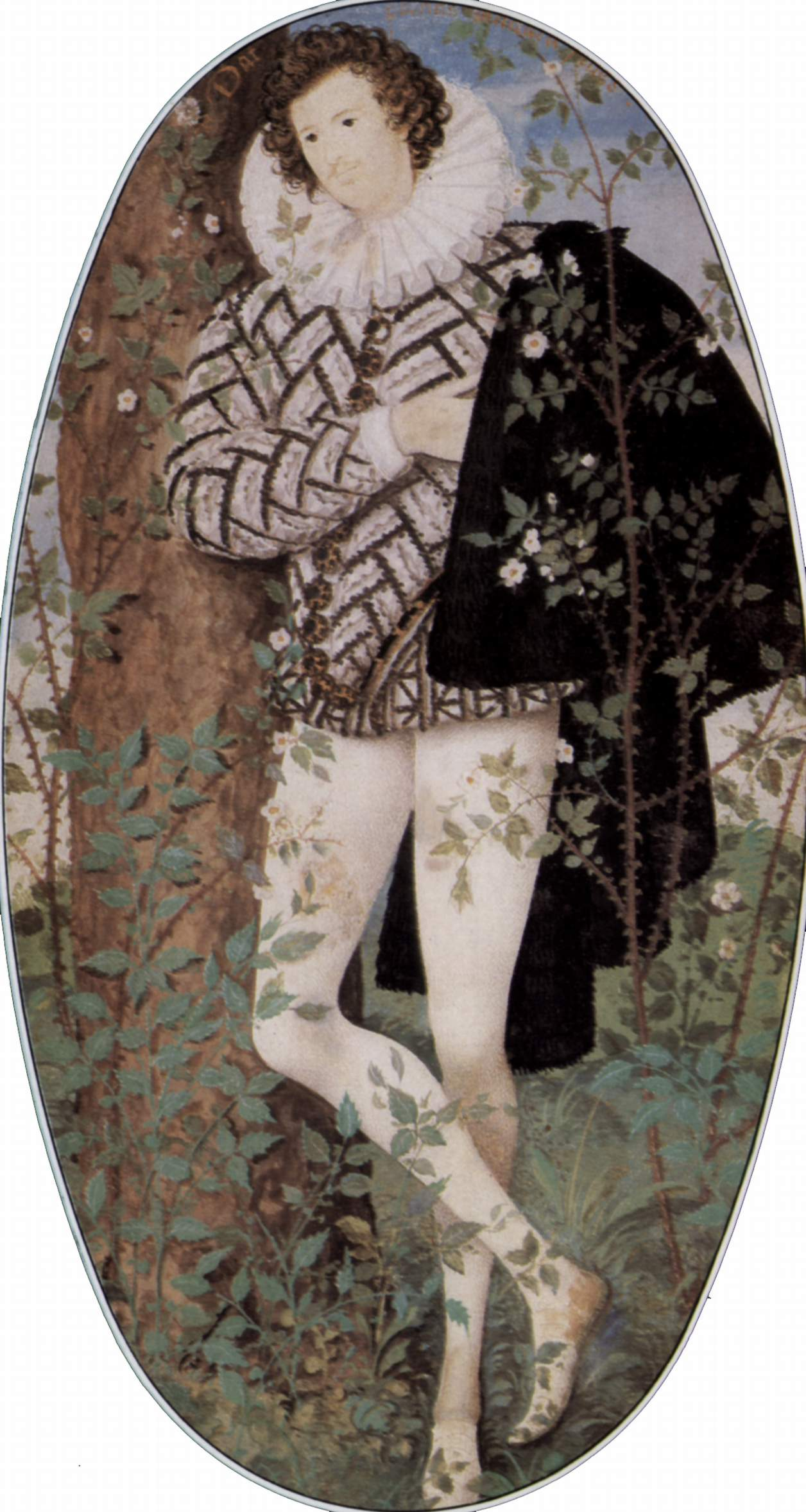
A miniature painting of Robert Devereux, 2nd Earl of Essex by Nicholas Hilliard, c. 1588

The title was first created in the 12th century for Geoffrey de Mandeville, 1st Earl of Essex (died 1144). Upon the death of the third earl in 1189, the title became dormant or extinct. Geoffrey Fitz Peter, who had married Beatrice de Say, granddaughter of the first earl's sister and eventual heir to the Mandeville honour, gained the earldom in 1199 at its second creation by King John. The Essex title passed to two of Fitz Peter's sons before again becoming extinct upon the death of the second son, William, the 3rd Earl of Essex, who had taken the surname de Mandeville.

The third creation was for Humphrey de Bohun, 2nd Earl of Hereford in 1239, whose father Henry had married Maud, sister of the sixth earl. All three of the Earldoms of Hereford, Northampton and of Essex became extinct in 1373. There were several more creations, including one briefly for Thomas Cromwell, before the Devereux creation in 1572. Walter Devereux was the first earl of this creation; he was related to the Bourchier family who had held the honour earlier. This line continued to his son Robert Devereux, 2nd Earl of Essex (1566–1601) a favourite of Queen Elizabeth I and his son Robert Devereux, 3rd Earl of Essex, the general who commanded the Parliamentary army at the Battle of Edge Hill, the first major battle of the English Civil War (for further history of the Devereux family, see the Viscount Hereford). Following its extinction in September 1646, the present creation was made in 1661.

== Capell creation ==
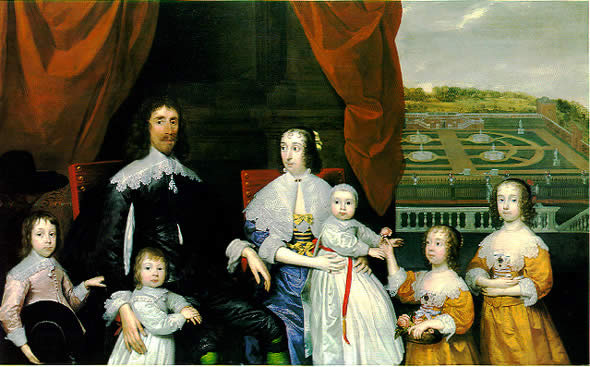
Arthur Capell, 1st Baron Capell of Hadham, and his family

The Capell (or Capel) family descends from Sir Arthur Capell of Raines Hall in Essex and of Hadham in Hertfordshire. His grandson Arthur Capell represented Hertfordshire in both the Short and Long Parliaments. In 1641 he was raised to the Peerage of England as Baron Capell of Hadham, in the County of Hertford. Capell later fought as a Royalist in the Civil War. He was tried and condemned to death by the Parliamentarians and beheaded in May 1649. He was succeeded by his eldest son, the second Baron. In 1661 he was created Viscount Malden, in the County of Essex, and Earl of Essex, with remainder, failing heirs male of his own, to, firstly, his brother Henry Capell (later Baron Capell of Tewkesbury; see below), failing which to, secondly, his brother Edward Capell. These titles are also in the Peerage of England. Lord Essex later served as Lord-Lieutenant of Ireland and as First Lord of the Treasury. On his death, the titles passed to his son, the second Earl. He was a lieutenant-general in the army and served as Lord-Lieutenant of Hertfordshire. He was succeeded by his son, the third Earl. He served as Captain of the Yeomen of the Guard from 1739 to 1743 and was also Lord-Lieutenant of Hertfordshire. When he died the titles passed to his son, the fourth Earl. He also served as Lord-Lieutenant of Hertfordshire.

He was succeeded by his eldest son from his first marriage, the fifth Earl. He sat in the House of Commons for many years and was Lord-Lieutenant of Hertfordshire from 1801 to 1817. Lord Essex assumed the surname of Coningsby. In 1839, at the age of seventy-six, he married the vocalist and actress Catherine Stephens. He was succeeded by his nephew, the sixth Earl. He was the son of the Hon. John Thomas Capell, second son of the fourth Earl from his second marriage to Harriet Bladen. On his death, the titles passed to his grandson, the seventh Earl. He was the eldest son of Lieutenant-Colonel Arthur de Vere Capell, Viscount Malden, eldest son of the sixth Earl. The line of the sixth Earl failed on the death of the seventh Earl's grandson, the ninth Earl, in 1981. The succession was unclear and it was not until 1989 that the late Earl's third cousin once removed, Robert Edward de Vere Capell, managed to prove his claim, and became the tenth Earl. He was the great-grandson of the Hon. Algernon Henry Champagné Capell (younger brother of the sixth Earl), son of the aforementioned the Hon. John Thomas Capell (half-brother of the fifth Earl), son of the second marriage of the fourth Earl. As of 2017 the titles are held by his only son, the eleventh Earl, who succeeded in 2005.

Two other members of the Capell family have also gained distinction. The Hon. Henry Capell, second son of the first Baron, was a politician and was created Baron Capell of Tewkesbury in 1692. The Hon. Sir Thomas Bladen Capell (1776–1853), youngest son of the second marriage of the fourth Earl, was an admiral in the Royal Navy.

== List of Earls of Essex ==
=== Earls of Essex, first creation (c. 1139) ===
- Geoffrey de Mandeville, 1st Earl of Essex (died 1144)
- Geoffrey de Mandeville, 2nd Earl of Essex (died 1166)
- William de Mandeville, 3rd Earl of Essex (died 1189) (extinct)

=== Earls of Essex, second creation (1199) ===
- Geoffrey Fitzpeter, 1st Earl of Essex (died 1213)
- Geoffrey FitzGeoffrey de Mandeville, 2nd Earl of Essex (died 1216)
- William FitzGeoffrey de Mandeville, 3rd Earl of Essex (died 1227) (extinct)

=== Earls of Essex, third creation (1239) ===
- Humphrey de Bohun, 1st Earl of Essex (died 1275)
- Humphrey de Bohun, 2nd Earl of Essex (died 1298)
- Humphrey de Bohun, 3rd Earl of Essex (died 1322)
- John de Bohun, 4th Earl of Essex (died 1336)
- Humphrey de Bohun, 5th Earl of Essex (1309–1361)
- Humphrey de Bohun, 6th Earl of Essex (1342–1373) (extinct)

=== Earls of Essex, fourth creation (1376) ===
- Thomas of Woodstock, Earl of Essex (1355–1397) (forfeit)

=== Earls of Essex, fifth creation (1461) ===
- Henry Bourchier, 1st Earl of Essex (died 1483)
- Henry Bourchier, 2nd Earl of Essex (died 1540) (extinct)

=== Earls of Essex, sixth creation (1540) ===
- Thomas Cromwell, Earl of Essex (1485–1540) (forfeit)

=== Earls of Essex, seventh creation (1543) ===
- William Parr, 1st Marquess of Northampton (1513–1571) (forfeit 1553; restored 1559; extinct 1571)

=== Earls of Essex, eighth creation (1572) ===
- Walter Devereux, 1st Earl of Essex (1541–1576)
- Robert Devereux, 2nd Earl of Essex (1566–1601)
- Robert Devereux, 3rd Earl of Essex (1591–1646) (extinct)

=== Barons Capell of Hadham (1641) ===
- Arthur Capell, 1st Baron Capell of Hadham (1604–1649)
- Arthur Capell, 2nd Baron Capell of Hadham (1631–1683) (created Earl of Essex in 1661)

=== Earls of Essex, ninth creation (1661) ===
- Arthur Capell, 1st Earl of Essex (1631–1683)
- Algernon Capell, 2nd Earl of Essex (1670–1710)
- William Capell, 3rd Earl of Essex (1697–1743)
- William Anne Capell, 4th Earl of Essex (1732–1799)
- George Capel-Coningsby, 5th Earl of Essex (1757–1839)
- Arthur Algernon Capell, 6th Earl of Essex (1803–1892)
  - Arthur de Vere Capell, Viscount Malden (1826–1879)
- George Devereux de Vere Capell, 7th Earl of Essex (1857–1916)
- Algernon George de Vere Capell, 8th Earl of Essex (1884–1966)
- Reginald George de Vere Capell, 9th Earl of Essex (1906–1981) (dormant 1981)
- Robert Edward de Vere Capell, 10th Earl of Essex (1920–2005) (revived 1989)
- (Frederick) Paul de Vere Capell, 11th Earl of Essex (born 1944)

The heir presumptive is the present holder's fourth cousin once-removed William Jennings Capell (born 1952).
The heir presumptive's heir apparent is his only son Kevin Devereux Capell (born 1982)

== Family tree ==
Family tree of the Earls of Essex, Earls of Hereford, and Viscounts Hereford

Godwin c. 1001–1053; Earl of Wessex
Earl of Hereford (1st creation), 1043	Earl of Hereford (3rd creation), 1058	Earl of Hereford (2nd creation), 1052	Earl of Hereford (4th creation), 1067
Sweyn Godwinson; 1020–1052; Earl of Hereford	Harold Godwinson (c. 1022–1066); Earl of Hereford, King of the English	William de Mandeville (d. before 1130)	Ralph the Timid d. 1057; Earl of Hereford	William FitzOsbern; 1011–1071; 1st Earl of Hereford
Earldom of Hereford (1st creation) forfeit, 1051	Earldom of Hereford (3rd creation) extinct, 1066	Earldom of Hereford (2nd creation) extinct, 1057
Earl of Essex (1st creation), 1140	Earl of Hereford (5th creation), 1141
William de Say I	Beatrice ("Beatrix") de Say d. 1197	Geoffrey de Mandeville d. 1144; 1st Earl of Essex	Roger de Breteuil; 1058– after 1087; 2nd Earl of Hereford	Miles of Gloucester d. 1143; 1st Earl of Hereford
Earldom of Hereford (4th creation) forfeit, 1074
William de Say II d. 1184	Geoffrey de Saye I d. 1214	Geoffrey de Mandeville d. 1166; 2nd Earl of Essex	William de Mandeville d. 1189; 3rd Earl of Essex	Margaret of Hereford; 1122/1123–1197	Roger Fitzmiles before 1125–1155; 2nd Earl of Hereford
Earldom of Essex (1st creation) extinct, 1189	Earldom of Hereford (5th creation) extinct, 1155
Earl of Essex (2nd creation), 1199
Geoffrey Fitz Peter c. 1162–1213; 1st Earl of Essex	Beatrice de Say	Geoffrey de Saye II; 1155–1230	Hawise ("Alice") de Clare	Humphrey III de Bohun before 1144–1181
Earl of Hereford (6th creation), 1199
Geoffrey FitzGeoffrey de Mandeville c. 1191–1216; 2nd Earl of Essex	William FitzGeoffrey de Mandeville d. 1227; 3rd Earl of Essex	Maud FitzGeoffrey; Maud de Mandeville	Henry de Bohun; 1176–1220; 1st Earl of Hereford
Earldom of Essex (2nd creation) extinct, 1227
Earl of Essex (3rd creation), 1239
Humphrey de Bohun; 1204–1275; 1st Earl of Essex, 2nd Earl of Hereford
Humphrey de Bohun d. 1265
Edward I 1239–1307; King of England	Humphrey de Bohun c. 1249–1298; 2nd Earl of Essex, 3rd Earl of Hereford
Edward II; 1284–1327; King of England	Elizabeth of Rhuddlan; 1282–1316	Humphrey de Bohun; 1276–1322; 3rd Earl of Essex, 4th Earl of Hereford
Edward III; 1312–1377; King of England	John de Bohun; 1306–1336; 4th Earl of Essex, 5th Earl of Hereford	Humphrey de Bohun; 1309–1361; 5th Earl of Essex, 6th Earl of Hereford	William de Bohun c. 1312–1360; 1st Earl of Northampton
Humphrey de Bohun; 1342–1373; 6th Earl of Essex, 7th Earl of Hereford
Earldom of Essex (3rd creation) and Earldom of Hereford (6th creation) extinct, 1373
Earl of Essex (4th creation), 1376
Thomas of Woodstock; 1355–1397; Earl of Essex	Eleanor de Bohun c. 1366–1399	Mary de Bohun c. 1369/1370–1394	Henry IV; 1367–1413; King of England
Earldom of Essex (4th creation) forfeit, 1397
William Bourchier; 1374–1420	Anne of Gloucester; 1383–1438
Earl of Essex (5th creation), 1461
Henry Bourchier c. 1404/1406–1483; 1st Earl of Essex
William Bourchier d. 1480; Viscount Bourchier	Anne Woodville; 1438–1489	Elizabeth Woodville c. 1437–1492	Edward IV; 1442–1483; King of England
John Devereux c. 1464–1501; 9th Baron Ferrers of Chartley	Cecily Bourchier (died c. 1492/1493)	Henry Bourchier c. 1467/80–1540; 2nd Earl of Essex	Elizabeth of York; 1466–1503	Thomas Parr; 1478–1517
Earldom of Essex (5th creation) forfeit 1540
Viscount Hereford	Earl of Essex (6th creation), 1540
Walter Devereux; 1488–1558; 1st Viscount Hereford, 10th Baron Ferrers of Chartley	Thomas Cromwell; 1485–1540; Earl of Essex	Henry VIII; 1491–1547; King of England
Earldom of Essex (6th creation) forfeit, 1540	Earl of Essex (7th creation), 1543
Richard Devereux c. 1513–1547	Catherine Parr; 1512–1548	William Parr; 1513–1571; Marquess of Northampton, Earl of Essex
Earldom of Essex (7th creation) forfeit 1553, restored 1559, extinct 1571
Earl of Essex (8th creation), 1572	Devereux Baronet of Castle Bromwich, 1611
Walter Devereux; 1541–1576; 1st Earl of Essex, 2nd Viscount Hereford	Edward Devereux c. 1550–1622; 1st Baronet
Robert Devereux; 1565–1601; 2nd Earl of Essex, 3rd Viscount Hereford	Walter Devereux; 1578–1658; 5th Viscount Hereford, 2nd Baronet	George Devereux c. 1581–1665
Earldom of Essex forfeit, 1601
Earldom of Essex (8th creation) restored, 1604	Baron Capell of Hadham, 1641
Robert Devereux; 1591–1646; 3rd Earl of Essex, 4th Viscount Hereford	Arthur Capell; 1604–1649; 1st Baron Capell of Hadham	Leicester Devereux; 1617–1676; 6th Viscount Hereford, 3rd Baronet
Earldom of Essex (8th creation) extinct, 1646
Earl of Essex (9th creation) and Viscount Malden, 1661	Baron Capell of Tewkesbury in the County of Gloucester, 1692
Arthur Capell; 1631–1683; 2nd Baron Capell of Hadham; 1st Earl of Essex, etc.	Henry Capell; 1638–1696; Baron Capell of Tewkesbury	Price Devereux c. 1637–1673	Vaughan Devereux d. 1700
Barony Capell of Tewkesbury extinct, 1696
Algernon Capell; 1670–1710; 2nd Earl of Essex, etc.	Leicester Devereux; 1674–1683; 7th Viscount Hereford, 4th Baronet	Edward Devereux; 1675–1700; 8th Viscount Hereford, 5th Baronet	Price Devereux; 1664–1740; 9th Viscount Hereford, 6th Baronet	Arthur Devereux d. 1711
William Capell; 1697–1743; 3rd Earl of Essex, etc.	Price Devereux; 1694–1748; 10th Viscount Hereford, 7th Baronet	Edward Devereux c. 1710–1760; 11th Viscount Hereford, 8th Baronet
Frances Hanbury-Williams c. 1735–1759	William Capell; 1732–1799; 4th Earl of Essex, etc.	Harriet Bladen; 1735–1821	Edward Devereux; 1740–1783; 12th Viscount Hereford, 9th Baronet	George Devereux; 1744–1804; 13th Viscount Hereford, 10th Baronet
George Capel-Coningsby; 1757–1839; 5th Earl of Essex, etc.	John Thomas Capell; 1769–1819	Henry Fleming Lea Devereux; 1777–1843; 14th Viscount Hereford, 11th Baronet
Arthur Algernon Capell; 1803–1892; 6th Earl of Essex, etc.	Algernon Capell; 1807–1886	Adolphus Capell; 1813–1899	Henry Devereux; 1807–1839	Robert Devereux; 1809–1855; 15th Viscount Hereford, 12th Baronet
Arthur de Vere Capell; 1826–1879 styled Viscount Malden	Charles Capell; 1845–1924	Horatio Bladen Capell; 1839–1933	Robert Devereux; 1843–1930; 16th Viscount Hereford, 13th Baronet
George Devereux de Vere Capell; 1857–1916; 7th Earl of Essex, etc.	Arthur Algernon de Vere Capell; 1891–1950	Horace Charles George Arthur Capell; 1868–1953	Algernon Essex Capell; 1869–1952	Henry Addison Devereux Capell 1873–1925	Robert Charles Devereux; 1865–1952; 17th Viscount Hereford, 14th Baronet
Algernon George de Vere Capell; 1884–1966; 8th Earl of Essex, etc.	Bladen Ozro Capell; 1897–1959	Algernon Arthur Capell; 1903–1950	Robert Capell b. 1903	Robert Devereux; 1894–1934
Earldom of Essex (9th creation) revived, 1989
Reginald George de Vere Capell; 1906–1981; 9th Earl of Essex, etc.	Robert Edward de Vere Capell; 1920–2005; 10th Earl of Essex, etc.	Bladen Horace Capell; 1922–1978	Colin Algernon Andrew Capell b. 1935	Robert Milo Leicester Devereux; 1932–2004; 18th Viscount Hereford, 15th Baronet
Earldom of Essex (9th creation) dormant, 1981
Frederick Paul de Vere Capell b. 1944; 11th Earl of Essex, etc.	William Jennings "Bill" Capell b. 1952	Clint Andrew Devereaux Capell b. 1960	Craig Robert Lawrence Capell b. 1962
Heir presumptive to the Earldom of Essex	Third in line to the Earldom of Essex	Fourth in line to the Earldom of Essex
Kevin Capell b. 1982	Dylan Colin David Capell b. 1987	Charles Robin de Bohun Devereux b. 1975; 19th Viscount Hereford, 16th Baronet
Second in line to the Earldom of Essex	Fifth in line to the Earldom of Essex
Henry Devereux b. 2015
Heir apparent to the Hereford Viscountcy

== Ancestral seat ==
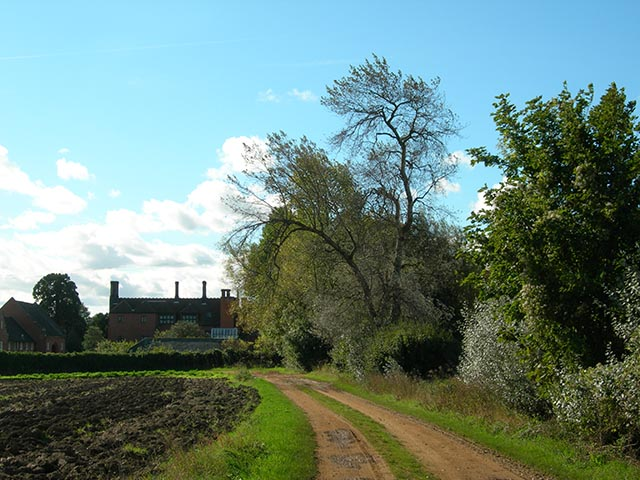
Hadham Hall, Little Hadham

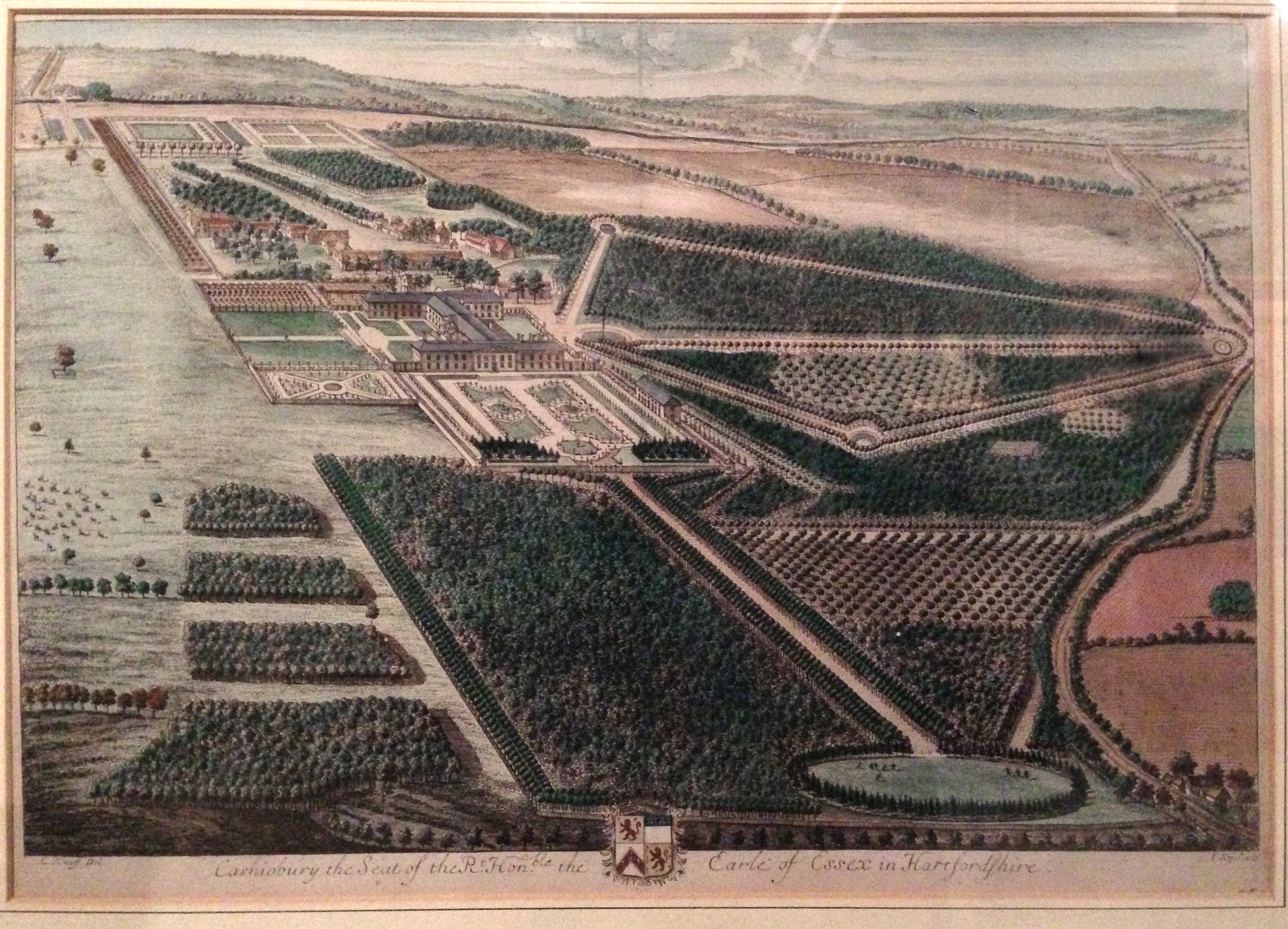
The Cassiobury Estate, Watford

At the time of the Capell creation, the Barons Hadham were based at the family seat at Hadham Hall in Little Hadham, Hertfordshire, which was originally purchased in the early 16th century by Sir William Capel, a wealthy draper and Lord Mayor of London. In 1627 his descendant Arthur Capell married Elizabeth Morrison, daughter and heir of Sir Charles Morrison of Cassiobury in Watford. The turmoil of the Civil War took its toll on the Capell family, and Arthur, a Royalist, was executed in 1649. Arthur Capell's eldest son, also called Arthur Capell, inherited both the Hadham and Cassiobury estates. After the Restoration, having been created Viscount Malden and 1st Earl of Essex, the younger Capell became an ambitious courtier of Charles II. Now one of the wealthiest men in England, he embarked on an ambitious project to redecorate Cassiobury House in the style of the sumptuous state rooms of Windsor Castle, hoping to attract a visit from the King to Cassiobury. Although a royal visit was not forthcoming, the 1st Earl's favour for Cassiobury completed the family's move to Watford, and Hadham Hall fell into disuse. The Capell family finally sold Hadham in 1900 and it is now a private residence; Cassiobury remained in the family until 1927 when, like many other British country houses in the period between the world wars, it was demolished.

The influence of the family is marked by the naming of Capel Road, Villiers Road, and the Villiers Arms public house in Oxhey Village, some two miles away from the site of Cassiobury House.

== Notes ==
=== Work cited ===
- Osmond, Airy; Leslie, Stephen (1887). "Capel, Arthur (1631-1683)" . In Stephen, Leslie (ed.). Dictionary of National Biography. Vol. 9. London: Smith, Elder & Co.
