= Humphrey de Bohun, 6th Earl of Hereford =

English noble

Arms of Bohun: Azure, a bend argent cotised or between six lions rampant or

Humphrey VIII de Bohun, 6th Earl of Hereford, 5th Earl of Essex (6 December 1309 – 15 October 1361) of Pleshy Castle in Essex, was hereditary Constable of England. He distinguished himself as a captain in the Breton campaigns of the Hundred Years' War, playing a part in winning the Battle of Morlaix (1342) and the Battle of La Roche-Derrien (1347).

== Origins ==
He was the son and heir of Humphrey de Bohun, 4th Earl of Hereford by his wife Elizabeth of Rhuddlan, the eighth and youngest daughter of King Edward I and Queen Eleanor of Castile. He was a younger brother of John de Bohun, 5th Earl of Hereford (d. 1336), whom he succeeded as Earl of Hereford and Essex and hereditary Constable of England, the seventh-highest office of the State.

== Poem William of Palerne ==
In about 1350 he commissioned an alliterative English translation of the French verse romance William of Palerne composed in about 1200, commissioned by Countess Yolande (who is generally identified as Yolande, daughter of Baldwin IV, Count of Hainaut). He is referred to as having ordered the translation as follows:

For the hend Erl of Herford, Sir Humfray de Bowne,
The king Edwardes newe, at Glouseter that ligges,
For he of Frensche this fayre tale ferst dede translate,
In ese of Englysch men, in Englysch speche.

"At Glouseter that ligges" (lies) is believed not to mean "lies buried" but rather "who lives at Gloucester", probably at his manor house of Wheatenhurst. Although many of his ancestors were buried in Llanthony Secunda Priory in Gloucester, the 6th earl was buried at the Austin Friars, London, which he himself had rebuilt. The poem later clarifies that he was alive at the time of its composition, as it concludes by urging the reader to pray to God to give the earl a "good life". He also had a neighbouring manor house at Haresfield, where Fosbrooke states the Bohuns had a castle, and where a low castle mound survives.

== Death and burial ==
He died at Pleshey and was buried in the Austin Friars, London, founded by his ancestor Humphrey IV de Bohun, 2nd Earl of Hereford, 1st Earl of Essex (1204–1275). The earldoms of Hereford and Essex passed to his nephew, Humphrey de Bohun, 7th Earl of Hereford, the son of his deceased younger brother, William de Bohun, 1st Earl of Northampton.

Peerage of England
Preceded by John de Bohun	Earl of Hereford; 1336–1361	Succeeded by Humphrey de Bohun
Preceded by John de Bohun	Earl of Essex; 1336–1361	Succeeded by Humphrey de Bohun
