= Humphrey de Bohun, 7th Earl of Hereford =

English nobleman (1342–1373)

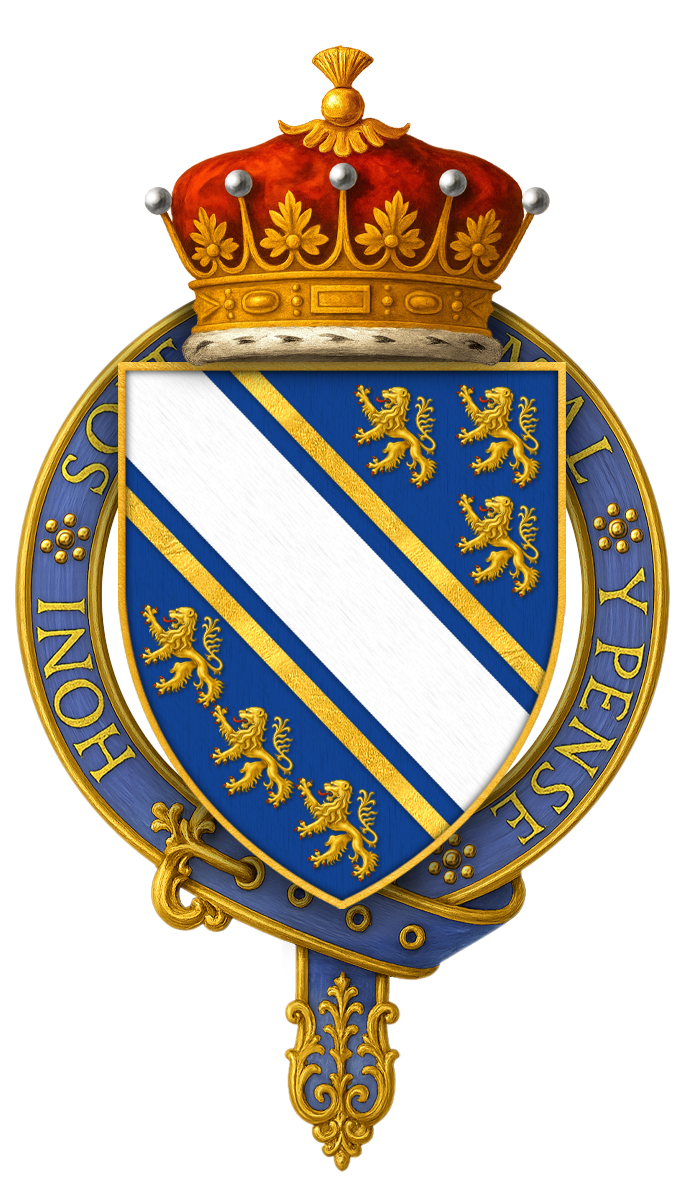
Arms of Sir Humphrey de Bohun, 7th Earl of Hereford, KG

Humphrey de Bohun, 7th Earl of Hereford, 6th Earl of Essex, 2nd Earl of Northampton KG (25 March 1342 – 16 January 1373) was the son of William de Bohun, 1st Earl of Northampton, and Elizabeth de Badlesmere, and grandson of Humphrey de Bohun, 3rd Earl of Hereford, by Elizabeth of Rhuddlan, daughter of King Edward I. He inherited the Earldom of Hereford after the death of his childless uncle Humphrey de Bohun, 6th Earl of Hereford.

Humphrey participated in the sack of Alexandria in 1365, following King Peter I's visit to England.

Humphrey's wife and the mother of his daughters was Joan Fitzalan, daughter of Richard Fitzalan, 10th Earl of Arundel, and Eleanor of Lancaster, whom he married after 9 September 1359.

On his death, his estates were inherited by his two surviving daughters and his titles went into abeyance:

- Eleanor de Bohun (1366 – 3 October 1399); married Thomas of Woodstock, 1st Duke of Gloucester, youngest son of Edward III
- Mary de Bohun, who married Henry Bolingbroke, the future King Henry IV of England.
- Elizabeth de Bohun, died young.

== Sources ==
- Gee, Loveday Lewes (2002). Women, Art, and Patronage from Henry III to Edward III: 1216-1377. The Boydell Press.
- Goodman, Anthony (1971). The Loyal Conspiracy: The Lords Appellant under Richard II. The University of Miami Press.
- Staley, Lynn (2000). "Pearl and the Contingencies of Love and Piety". In Aers, David (ed.). Medieval Literature and Historical Inquiry: Essays in Honor of Derek Pearsall. D.S. Brewer. pp. 83–115.
- Ward, Jennifer, ed. (1995). Women of the English Nobility and Gentry, 1066-1500. Translated by Ward, Jennifer. Manchester University Press.

Political offices
Preceded by Humphrey de Bohun	Lord High Constable; 1361–1372	Succeeded by Thomas of Woodstock
Peerage of England
Preceded by William de Bohun	Earl of Northampton; 1360–1373	In abeyance Title next held by Henry Bolingbroke
Preceded by Humphrey de Bohun	Earl of Hereford; 1361–1373	Extinct or in abeyance or dormant next held as dukedom by Henry Bolingbroke
Preceded by Humphrey de Bohun	Earl of Essex; 1361–1373	In abeyance Title next held by Thomas of Woodstock
