= Robin Devereux, 19th Viscount Hereford =

English Peer

The Right Honourable The Viscount Hereford

Personal details
- Born: 11 August 1975 (age 50)
- Spouse: Louisa Knight (m. 2010)
- Parents: Robert Devereux, 18th Viscount Hereford; Susan Godley
- Education: Stowe School
- Alma mater: University of East Anglia

Charles Robin de Bohun Devereux, 19th Viscount Hereford, 16th Baronet (born 11 August 1975), is the premier viscount in the Peerage of England.

== Education ==
Devereux was educated at Stowe School and at the University of East Anglia where he graduated in 1998 with a BA degree in History of Art and Architecture.

== Career ==
Devereux joined Bonhams Auctioneers upon graduation in 1998, was the Director of Valuations from 2007, and a UK Board Director from 2010. In 2017 Lord Hereford was appointed Director of Private Clients for Bonhams.

In 2024, Hereford became an art consultant to both MEUM Group and Bonhams, and was included in the Spear’s 500 ranking of Best Art Advisors in 2025. In September 2025, Hereford was appointed Chairman of Fellows Auctioneers, the specialist luxury auction house.

== Family ==
Upon the death in 2004 of his father, the 18th Viscount Hereford, he succeeded to the family titles as Viscount Hereford and 16th baronet.

On 12 June 2010, Hereford married Louisa Knight, a textile designer, younger daughter of William Knight and his wife Sylvia Caroline van Lennep, of Holland Park, London. They have two children:

- The Honourable Sophia Emily Florence Devereux (b. 12 January 2013)
- The Honourable Henry Walter de Bohun Devereux (b. 11 February 2015), heir apparent.

On 6 May 2023, Lord Hereford attended the coronation of Charles III and Camilla at Westminster Abbey in his capacity as Premier Viscount of England.

He is a member of White's.

== Arms ==
Coat of arms of Robin Devereux, 19th Viscount Hereford
Coronet that of a Viscount Crest Out of a Ducal Coronet Or a Talbot's Head Argent eared Gules Escutcheon Argent a Fess Gules in chief three Torteaux Supporters Dexter: a Talbot Argent eared Gules ducally gorged of the Last; Sinister: a Reindeer Proper horned ducally gorged and lined Or Motto Virtutis Comes Invidia Orders

== See also ==
- Count of Évreux

Peerage of England
Preceded by Robert Devereux	Viscount Hereford; 2004–present	Incumbent; Heir apparent: Hon. Henry Devereux
