= Humphrey de Bohun, 3rd Earl of Hereford =

13th-century English nobleman

Humphrey de Bohun
- 3rd Earl of Hereford
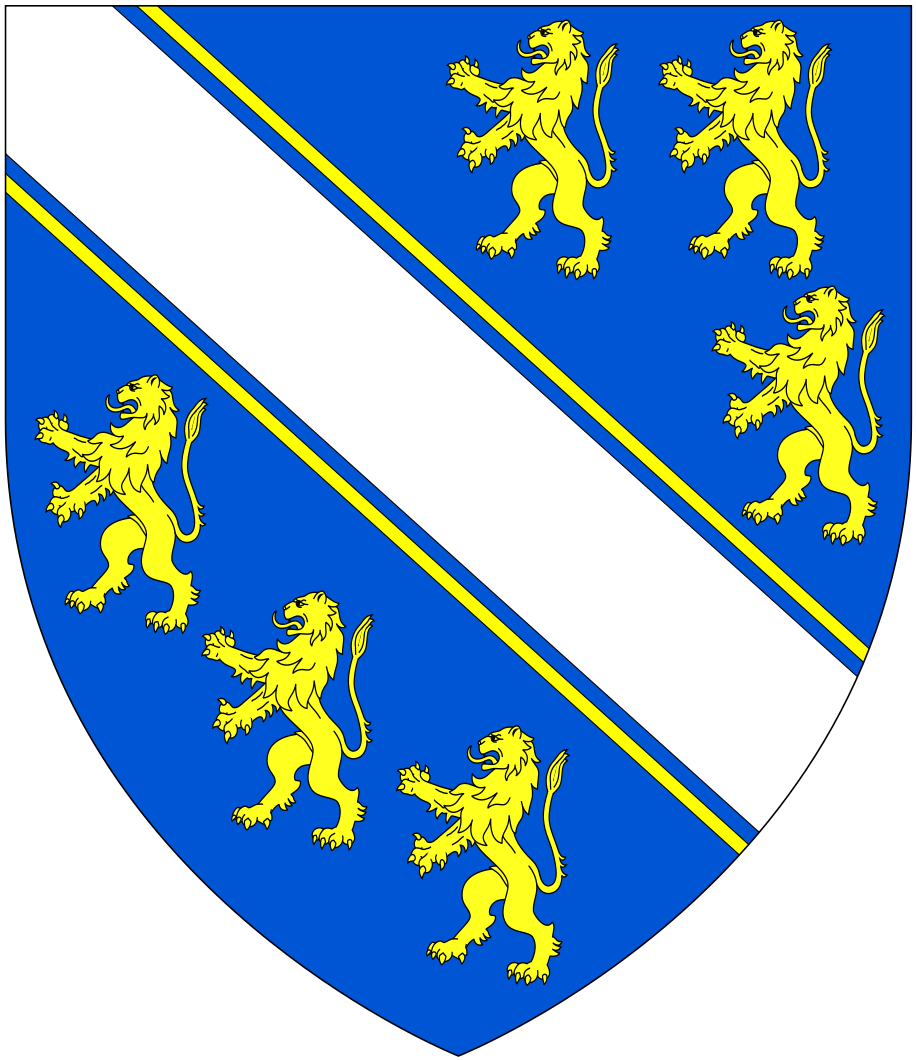
- Arms of Bohun: Azure, a bend argent cotised or between six lions rampant of the last
- Tenure: 1270–1298
- Predecessor: Humphrey de Bohun, 2nd Earl of Hereford
- Other titles: 2nd Earl of Essex
- Known for: Opposition to Edward I
- Years active: 1260s–1298
- Born: c. 1249 (Note: He was reported to be 18½ years old in the 51st year of the reign of Henry III, and 24 or 26 after the death of his grandfather in 1275. Cokayne (1910–59), pp. 463–6.)
- Died: 31 December 1298; Pleshey, Essex, England
- Buried: Walden Priory; 52.0262°N 0.2449°E
- Residence: Pleshey Castle
- Locality: Essex, Wiltshire, Welsh Marches
- Wars and battles: Welsh Wars
- Offices: Constable of England
- Noble family: Bohun
- Spouse: Maud de Fiennes
- Issue: Humphrey de Bohun, 4th Earl of Hereford
- Parents: Humphrey (V) de Bohun; Eleanor de Braose

Humphrey VI de Bohun, 3rd Earl of Hereford, 2nd Earl of Essex (c. 1249 – 31 December 1298) was an English nobleman known primarily for his opposition to King Edward I over the Confirmatio Cartarum. He was also an active participant in the Welsh Wars and maintained for several years a private feud with the earl of Gloucester. His father, Humphrey (V) de Bohun, fought on the side of the rebellious barons in the Barons' War. When Humphrey (V) predeceased his father, Humphrey (VI) became heir to his grandfather, Humphrey (IV). At Humphrey (IV)'s death in 1275, Humphrey (VI) inherited the earldoms of Hereford and Essex. He also inherited major possessions in the Welsh Marches from his mother, Eleanor de Braose.

Bohun spent most of his early career reconquering marcher lands captured by Llywelyn ap Gruffudd during the Welsh war in England. This was finally accomplished through Edward I's war in Wales in 1277. Hereford also fought in Wales in 1282–83 and 1294–95. At the same time he also had private feuds with other marcher lords, and his conflict with Gilbert de Clare, Earl of Gloucester, eventually ended with the personal intervention of King Edward himself. Hereford's final years were marked by the opposition he and Roger Bigod, Earl of Norfolk, mounted against the military and fiscal policy of Edward I. The conflict escalated to a point where civil war threatened, but was resolved when the war effort turned towards Scotland. The king signed the Confirmatio Cartarum—a confirmation of Magna Carta—and Bohun and Bigod agreed to serve on the Falkirk Campaign. Bohun died in 1298, and was succeeded by his son, Humphrey de Bohun, 4th Earl of Hereford.

== Family background and inheritance ==
Humphrey (VI) de Bohun was part of a line of Anglo-Norman aristocrats going back to the Norman Conquest, most of whom carried the same name. His grandfather was Humphrey (IV) de Bohun, who had been part of the baronial opposition of Simon de Montfort, but later gone over to the royal side. He was taken prisoner at the Battle of Lewes in May 1264, but was restored to favour after the royalist victory at the Battle of Evesham the next year. Humphrey (IV)'s son, Humphrey (V) de Bohun, remained loyal to the baronial side throughout the Barons' War, and was captured at Evesham on 4 August 1265. In October of that year, Humphrey (V) died in captivity at Beeston Castle in Cheshire from injuries he had sustained in the battle.

Humphrey (V) had been excluded from succession as a result of his rebellion, but when Humphrey (IV) died in 1275, Humphrey (VI) inherited the earldoms of Hereford and Essex. Humphrey (VI) had already served as deputy Constable of England under Humphrey (IV). Humphrey (IV) had reserved the honour of Pleshey for his younger son Henry, but the remainder of his lands went to Humphrey (VI). The inheritance Humphrey (VI) received—in addition to land in Essex and Wiltshire from Humphrey (IV)—also consisted of significant holdings in the Welsh Marches from his mother. His mother Eleanor was a daughter and coheir of William de Braose and his wife Eva Marshal, who in turn was the daughter and co-heir of William Marshal, regent to Henry III.

Since Humphrey (VI) was only sixteen years old at the time of his father's death, the Braose lands were taken into the king's custody until 1270. Part of this inheritance, the marcher lordship of Brecon, was in the meanwhile given to the custody of Gilbert de Clare, Earl of Hertford. Humphrey technically regained his lordship from Clare in 1270, but by this time these lands had effectively been taken over by the Welsh prince Llywelyn ap Gruffudd, who had taken advantage of the previous decade's political chaos in England to extend his territory into the Marches.

He granted his brother Sir Gilbert de Bohun all of their mother's lands in Ireland and some land in England and Wales.

== Welsh Wars ==
Over the next years, much of Hereford's focus was on reconquering his lost lands in the Marches, primarily through private warfare against Llywelyn. Henry III died in 1272, while his son—now Edward I—was crusading; Edward did not return until 1274. Llywelyn refused to pay homage to the new king, partly because of the military actions of Bohun and other marcher lords, which Llywelyn saw as violations of the Treaty of Montgomery. On 12 November 1276, Hereford was present at a royal assembly where judgment was passed on Llewelyn, and in 1277, Edward I declared war on the Welsh prince. Rebellion in his own Brecon lands delayed Hereford's participation in the early days of the Welsh war. He managed, however, to both suppress the rebellion and conquer lands further west. He then joined up with the royal army and served for a while in Anglesey, before returning to Brecon, where he received the surrender of certain Welsh lords. After the campaign was over, on 2 January 1278, he received protection from King Edward to go on pilgrimage to Santiago de Compostela in Spain.

In 1282, war with Wales broke out again; this time it would not be simply a punitive campaign, but a full-scale war of conquest. Initially, the king wanted to fight the war with paid forces, but the nobility insisted on the use of the feudal summons. To men like Hereford, this was preferable, because as part of a feudal army the participants would have both a stake in the war and a justifiable claim on conquered land. In the end, although the earls won, none of them were paid for the war effort. Hereford jealously guarded his authority as hereditary Constable of England, and protested vigorously when the Gilbert de Clare, Earl of Gloucester was appointed commander of the forces in South Wales. In the post-war settlement, however, neither Hereford nor Gloucester received any significant rewards of land, the way several other magnates did. Hereford fought again in Wales, in the suppression of the rebellion of 1294–95, when he again had to pacify the territory of Brecon before joining the king in the north.

== Private war in the Marches ==
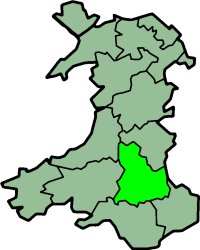
The historic county of Brecknockshire, which corresponds roughly to Hereford's lordship of Brecon (the bulk), together with the Lordship of Buellt (the northwest corner).

Parallel with the Welsh Wars, Hereford was also struggling to assert his claims to lands in the Marches against other marcher lords. In 1284 Edward I granted the hundred of Iscennen in Carmarthenshire to John Giffard. Hereford believed the land belonged to him by right of conquest, and started a campaign to win the lands back, but the king took Giffard's side. Problems also arose with the earl of Gloucester. As Gloucester's former ward, Hereford had to buy back his own right of marriage, but Gloucester claimed he had not received the full sum. There was also remaining resentment on Hereford's part for his subordination to Gloucester in the 1282–83 campaign. The conflict came to a head when Gloucester's started construction of a castle at Morlais, which Hereford claimed was his land. In 1286, the Crown ordered Gloucester to cease, but to no avail.

It had long been established Marches custom to solve conflicts through private warfare. Hereford's problem, however, was his relative weakness in the Marches, and now he was facing open conflict with two different enemies. He, therefore, decided to take the issue to the king instead, in a break with tradition. King Edward again ordered Gloucester to stop, but the earl ignored the order and initiated raids on Hereford's lands. Hostilities continued and Hereford responded, until both earls were arrested and brought before the king. The real offence was not the private warfare in itself, but the fact that the earls had not respected the king's injunction to cease. In the parliament of January 1292, Gloucester was fined 10,000 marks and Hereford 1,000. Gloucester's liberty of Glamorgan was declared forfeit, and confiscated by the crown, as was Hereford's of Brecon.

In the end, the fines were never paid, and the lands were soon restored. Edward had nevertheless demonstrated an important point. After the conquest of Wales, the strategic position of the Marcher lordships was less vital to the English crown, and the liberty awarded to the marcher lords could be curtailed. For Edward this was, therefore, a good opportunity to assert the royal prerogative, and to demonstrate that it extended also into the Marches of Wales.

== Opposition to Edward I ==
In 1294, the French king declared the English duchy of Aquitaine forfeit, and war broke out between the two countries. Edward I embarked on a wide-scale and costly project of building alliances with other princes on the Continent, and preparing an invasion. When the king, at the parliament of March 1297 in Salisbury, demanded military service from his earls, Roger Bigod, Earl of Norfolk, refused in his capacity of marshal of England. The argument was that the king's subjects were not obliged to serve abroad if not in the company of the king, but Edward insisted on taking his army to Flanders while sending his earls to Gascony.

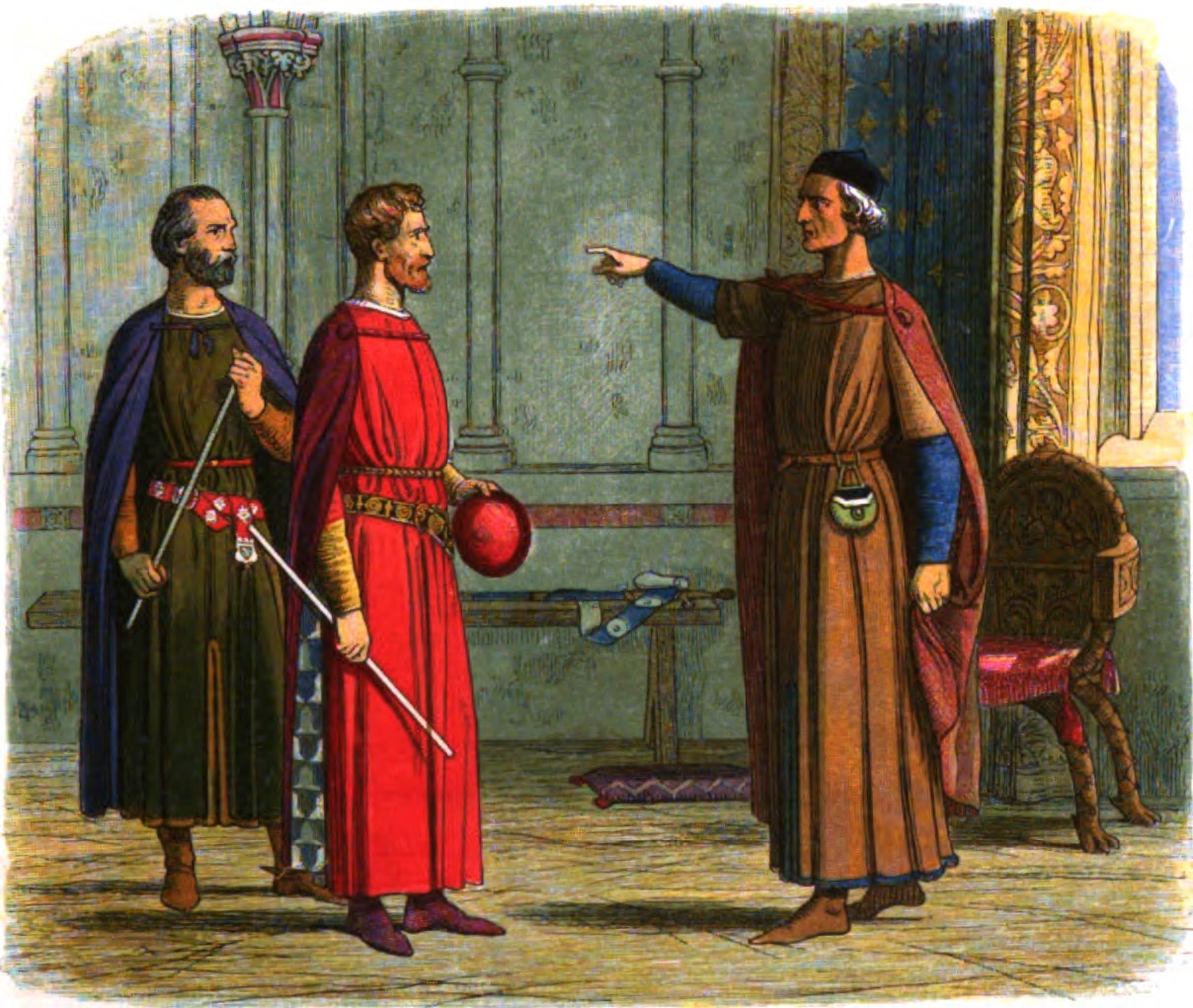
Bohun and Bigod confront King Edward. Early 20th-century imaginary illustration

At the time of the Salisbury parliament, Hereford was accompanying two of the king's daughters to Brabant, and could not be present. On his return, however, as Constable of England, he joined Bigod in July in refusing to perform feudal service. The two earls were joined in their opposition by the earls of Arundel and Warwick. The main reason for the magnates' defiance was the heavy burden of taxation caused by Edward's continuous warfare in Wales, France and Scotland. In this they were also joined by Robert Winchelsey, the Archbishop of Canterbury, who was in the midst of an ongoing dispute with the king over clerical taxation. At one point, Bohun and Bigod turned up in person at the Exchequer to protest a tax that they claimed did not have the consent of the community of the realm. For Hereford, there was also a personal element in the opposition to the king, after the humiliation and the affront to his liberties he had suffered over the dispute in the Marches. At a meeting just outside London, Bohun gave an impassioned speech objecting to the king's abuse of power and demanding the restoration of ancient liberties. The grievances were summarised in a document known as the Remonstrances.

Neither party showed any inclination to back down, and the nation seemed on the brink of another civil war. Just as the conflict was coming to a head, however, external events intervened to settle it. In September 1297, the English suffered a heavy defeat to the Scots at the Battle of Stirling Bridge. The Scottish victory exposed the north of England to Scottish raids led by William Wallace. The war with Scotland received wider support from the English magnates, now that their own homeland was threatened, than did the war in France to protect the king's continental possessions. Edward abandoned his campaign in France and negotiated a truce with the French king. He agreed to confirm Magna Carta in the so-called Confirmatio Cartarum (Confirmation of the Charters). The earls consequently consented to serve with the king in Scotland, and Hereford was in the army that won a decisive victory over the Scots in the Battle of Falkirk in 1298. Hereford, not satisfied that the king had upheld the charter, withdrew after the battle, forcing Edward to abandon the campaign.

== Death and family ==
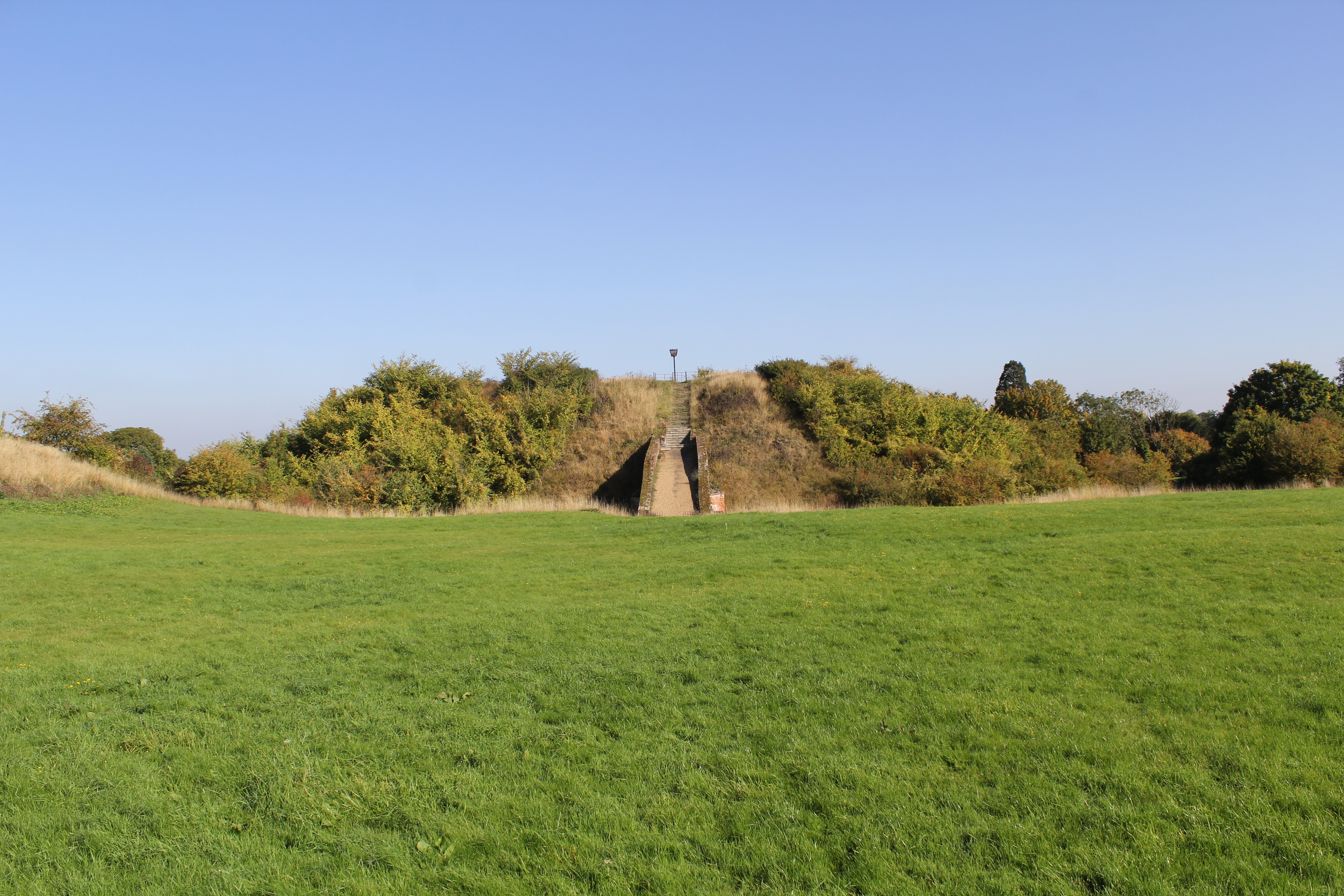
The earthwork remains of Pleshey Castle where Humphrey de Bohun died.

In 1275, Bohun married Maud de Fiennes, daughter of Enguerrand de Fiennes, chevalier, seigneur of Fiennes, by his 2nd wife, Isabel (kinswoman of Queen Eleanor of Provence ). She predeceased him, and was buried at Walden Priory in Essex. Hereford himself died at Pleshey Castle on 31 December 1298, and was buried at Walden alongside his wife. They had one son, Humphrey de Bohun, 4th Earl of Hereford, born around 1276. The son was given possession of his father's lands and titles on 16 February 1299. The young Humphrey also inherited his father's title of Constable of England.

A common theme in Humphrey de Bohun's actions was his fierce protection of what he regarded as his feudal privileges. His career was marked by turbulence and political strife, particularly in the Marches of Wales, but, eventually, he left a legacy of consolidated possessions there. In 1297, at the height of the conflict between Edward I and rebellious barons, the king had actively tried to undermine Hereford's authority in the Marches, but failed due to the good relations the earl enjoyed with the local men.

== Sources ==
- Carpenter, David (2003). The Struggle for Mastery: Britain, 1066-1284. Oxford: Oxford University Press. ISBN 0-19-522000-5.
- Cokayne, George (1910–59). The Complete Peerage of England, Scotland, Ireland, Great Britain and the United Kingdom. Vol. VI (New ed.). London: The St. Catherine Press.
- Davies, R. R. (1978). Lordship and Society in the March of Wales, 1282-1400. Oxford: Clarendon Press. ISBN 0-19-822454-0.
- Davies, R. R. (2000). The Age of Conquest: Wales, 1063-1415. Oxford: Oxford University Press. ISBN 0-19-820878-2.
- Fritze, Ronald H.; William Baxter Robison (2002). "Bohoun, Humphrey de, 3rd Earl of Hereford and 2nd Earl of Essex (c. 1249-98)". Historical dictionary of late medieval England, 1272-1485. Westport, London: Greenwood Publishing Group. pp. 61–3. ISBN 0-313-29124-1.
- Hicks, Michael (1991). Who's Who in Late Medieval England (1272-1485). Who's Who in British History Series. Vol. 3. London: Shepheard-Walwyn. pp. 29–30. ISBN 0-85683-092-5.
- Morris, J. E. (1901). The Welsh Wars of Edward I. Oxford: Clarendon Press.
- Morris, Marc (2008). A Great and Terrible King: Edward I and the Forging of Britain (updated ed.). London: Hutchinson. ISBN 978-0-09-179684-6.
- Prestwich, Michael (1972). War, Politics and Finance under Edward I. London: Faber and Faber. ISBN 0-571-09042-7.
- Prestwich, Michael (1997). Edward I (updated ed.). New Haven: Yale University Press. ISBN 0-300-07209-0.
- Prestwich, Michael (2007). Plantagenet England: 1225-1360 (new ed.). Oxford: Oxford University Press. ISBN 978-0-19-822844-8.
- Powicke, F. M. (1953). The Thirteenth Century: 1216-1307. Oxford: Clarendon. ISBN 0-19-285249-3.
- Vincent, Nicholas (2004). "Bohun, Humphrey (IV) de, second earl of Hereford and seventh earl of Essex (d. 1275)". Oxford Dictionary of National Biography. Oxford: Oxford University Press. doi:10.1093/ref:odnb/2775.
- Waugh, Scott L. (2004). "Bohun, Humphrey (VI) de, third earl of Hereford and eighth earl of Essex (c.1249–1298)". Oxford Dictionary of National Biography. Oxford: Oxford University Press. doi:10.1093/ref:odnb/2776.

Political offices
Preceded by Hamo de Crevecoeur	Lord Warden of the Cinque Ports; 1264–?	Succeeded by Edmund Crouchback
Preceded by Humphrey (IV) de Bohun	Lord High Constable; 1275–1297	Succeeded by Humphrey (VII) de Bohun
Peerage of England
Preceded by Humphrey (IV) de Bohun	Earl of Hereford; Earl of Essex; 1275–1297	Succeeded by Humphrey (VII) de Bohun
