= Eleanor de Bohun, Countess of Ormonde =

English noblewoman (1304–1363)

Eleanor de Bohun
- Countess of Ormond
- Born: 17 October 1304; Knaresborough Castle, West Riding of Yorkshire, England
- Died: 7 October 1363 (aged 58); Aldgate, Middlesex, England
- Buried: Chapel of Saint Edmunds, Westminster Abbey
- Noble family: Bohun
- Spouses: James Butler, 1st Earl of Ormond (m. 1327; died 1337) Thomas de Dagworth, Lord Dagworth (m. 1343; died 1352)
- Issue: John Butler; Petronilla Butler; James Butler, 2nd Earl of Ormond; Eleanor de Dagworth
- Father: Humphrey de Bohun, 4th Earl of Hereford
- Mother: Elizabeth of Rhuddlan

Eleanor de Bohun, Countess of Ormond (17 October 1304 – 7 October 1363) was an English noblewoman born in Knaresborough Castle to Humphrey de Bohun, 4th Earl of Hereford, and Elizabeth, daughter of King Edward I of England and Eleanor of Castile. After the deaths of her parents, she was placed in the care of her aunt Mary of Woodstock and brought up at Amesbury Priory alongside various cousins including Joan Gaveston, Isabel of Lancaster and Joan de Monthermer. Edward II of England gave the priory a generous allowance of 100 marks annually for the upkeep of Eleanor and her younger cousin, Joan Gaveston.

Eleanor was married twice; first in 1327 to James Butler, 1st Earl of Ormond, son of Edmund Butler, Earl of Carrick, and Lady Joan FitzGerald, who died in 1337 and secondly, six years later in 1343, to Thomas de Dagworth, Lord Dagworth, who was killed in an ambush in Brittany in 1352.

== Children ==
By James Butler:

- John Butler (born 6 November 1330, died young)
- Petronilla (or Perina) Butler, Baroness Talbot (died 1387) who married Gilbert Talbot, 3rd Baron Talbot and had a daughter, Elizabeth Talbot, who married Sir Henry de Grey of Wilton, 5th Baron Grey de Wilton. They were ancestors to Queen Catherine Parr, sixth wife of King Henry VIII.
- James Butler, 2nd Earl of Ormond (4 October 1331 – 18 October 1382) who married Elizabeth Darcy.

By Thomas de Dagworth:

- Eleanor de Dagworth who married at Vachery (in Cranley), Surrey by licence dated 23 June 1362 Walter Fitz Walter, Knt, 3rd Lord Fitz Walter (1345–1386). Eleanor was living 29 Nov 1375. At her death, she was buried in Dunmow Priory.

== See also ==
- Butler dynasty
