= Elizabeth of Rhuddlan =

English princess and noblewoman (1282–1316)

- Countess of Hereford
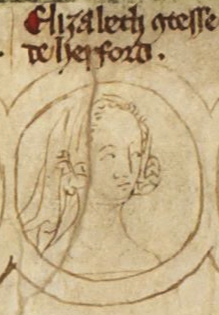
- Elizabeth in a 14th-century family tree

Countess consort of Holland
- Tenure: 8 January 1297 – 10 November 1299
- Born: 7 August 1282; Rhuddlan Castle, Denbighshire
- Died: 5 May 1316 (aged 33); Quendon, Essex
- Spouse: John I, Count of Holland (m. 1297; died 1299) Humphrey de Bohun, 4th Earl of Hereford (m. 1302)
- Issue Detail: Eleanor de Bohun, Countess of Ormonde; John de Bohun, 5th Earl of Hereford; Humphrey de Bohun, 6th Earl of Hereford; Margaret de Bohun, Countess of Devon; William de Bohun, 1st Earl of Northampton
- House: Plantagenet
- Father: Edward I of England
- Mother: Eleanor of Castile

Elizabeth of Rhuddlan (7 August 1282 – 5 May 1316) was the eighth and youngest daughter of Edward I of England and Eleanor of Castile and was born in Rhuddlan Castle in Denbighshire. Of all of her siblings, she was closest to her younger brother Edward II, as they were only two years apart in age.

== Early life ==
Elizabeth stayed with her parents, especially her mother, for the first few years of her life. She was at Caernarfon Castle in 1284 when her younger brother, Edward, was born. A year later Elizabeth and her family visited the south of England, firstly going to Thomas à Beckett's shrine at Canterbury Cathedral, then staying at Leeds Castle before finally going to Amesbury, where her paternal grandmother, Eleanor of Provence, was living. In 1286, Elizabeth and Edward were left with their grandmother, whilst their parents left for the continent to try and negotiate a peace deal between France and Aragon, in the hope of starting another Crusade. Although another Crusade did not materialise, Edward and Eleanor stayed in Europe for several years until 1289. When they returned to England it was clear that the two youngsters had been over-indulged by their grandmother. This caused their mother to be concerned that maybe history was repeating itself, as her older daughter, Joan of Acre, had been brought up and spoiled by her maternal grandmother, Joan, Countess of Ponthieu, leading the child to become disobedient and rebellious who "stood in no awe of her parents". Edward though continued to spoil Elizabeth, much as his mother had done, as it's believed Elizabeth was his favorite child.

In October 1290, Elizabeth's mother became ill and she was summoned to see her at King John's Palace in Clipstone in Nottinghamshire. Eleanor died at Harby, Nottinghamshire on 28 November 1290. Elizabeth was just eight years old. The king took his late wife back to London for burial at Westminster Abbey, ordering stone crosses to be erected at the places they stopped en route. These became known as Eleanor crosses.

== First marriage ==
In April 1285 there were negotiations with Floris V for Elizabeth's betrothal to his son John I, Count of Holland. The offer was accepted and John was sent to England to be educated. On 8 January 1297 Elizabeth was married to John at Ipswich. In attendance at the marriage were Elizabeth's sister Margaret, her father, Edward I of England, her brother Edward, and Humphrey de Bohun (who became Elizabeth's second husband). After the wedding Elizabeth was expected to go to Holland with her husband, but she did not wish to leave her father or England, so John had to go to Holland alone. It is recorded that the king, in an outburst at her refusal to leave with her husband, threw his daughter's coronet into the fire. A great ruby and a great emerald, stones supplied by Adam the Goldsmith, were lost as a result.

After some time travelling around England in 1297, it was decided Elizabeth should follow her husband. Her father accompanied her, travelling through the Southern Netherlands between Antwerp, Mechelen, Leuven and Brussels, before ending up in Ghent. There they remained for a few months, spending Christmas with her two sisters Eleanor and Margaret. On 10 November 1299, John died of dysentery, though there were rumours of his murder. The marriage did not produce any heirs.

== Second marriage ==
On her return trip to England, Elizabeth went through Brabant to see her sister Margaret. When she arrived in England, she met her stepmother Margaret, whom Edward had married while Elizabeth was in Holland. On 14 November 1302 Elizabeth was married to Humphrey de Bohun, 4th Earl of Hereford, 3rd of Essex, also Constable of England, at Westminster Abbey.

In 1303, she was pregnant and travelled from Dunfermline Abbey in Scotland to Tynemouth. She gave birth to her first child, Margaret de Bohun, in September, assisted by a holy relic of the girdle of the Virgin, brought especially from Westminster Abbey. Margaret died young but Elizabeth would go on to have a large family, giving birth to numerous children in quick succession, although only seven reached adulthood. Of those seven, only four had children themselves.

== Issue ==
The children of Elizabeth and Humphrey de Bohun, 4th Earl of Hereford were:

1. Margaret de Bohun (born 1302 – died 7 February 1304)
2. Humphrey de Bohun (born c. October 1303 – died c. October 1304)
3. Lady Eleanor de Bohun (17 October 1304 – 1363)
4. John de Bohun, 5th Earl of Hereford (23 November 1306 – 20 January 1336)
5. Humphrey de Bohun, 6th Earl of Hereford (6 December c. 1309 – 1361)
6. Margaret de Bohun, 2nd Countess of Devon (3 April 1311 – 1391)
7. William de Bohun, 1st Earl of Northampton (1312–1360)
8. Edward de Bohun (1312–1334), twin of William
9. Agnes, married Robert de Ferrers, 2nd Baron Ferrers of Chartley, son of John de Ferrers, 1st Baron Ferrers of Chartley
10. Eneas de Bohun, (1314 – after 1322); he is mentioned in his father's will.
11. Isabel de Bohun (born and died 5 May 1316)

== Later life ==
Despite Elizabeth being close to her younger brother, his friendship with Piers Gaveston caused problems and there was a period of a few years when the two siblings were semi-estranged. Elizabeth's husband, Humphrey (who was Lord High Constable of England), believed Gaveston was a traitor and in 1310/11 refused to fight in Scotland, because of his dislike of the royal favorite. De Bohun was one of the leaders that eventually deposed Gaveston but he eventually received a royal pardon.

During Christmas 1315, Elizabeth, who was pregnant with her eleventh child, was visited by her sister-in-law, Queen Isabella of France. On 5 May 1316 she went into labour, giving birth to her daughter Isabella. Both Elizabeth and her daughter Isabella died shortly after the birth.

Elizabeth was interred at Waltham Abbey, Essex, together with her infant daughter and other members of the de Bohun family. Her husband Humphrey outlived her by six years and suffered depression after her death. He was killed at the Battle of Boroughbridge and was buried at the Church of the Friars Preachers in York, against the request in his will to be buried next to his wife in Waltham Abbey.

== Ancestry ==
Ancestors of Elizabeth of Rhuddlan

8. John of England
4. Henry III of England
9. Isabella of Angoulême
2. Edward I of England
10. Ramon Berenguer IV, Count of Provence
5. Eleanor of Provence
11. Beatrice of Savoy
1. Elizabeth of Rhuddlan
12. Alfonso IX of León
6. Ferdinand III of Castile
13. Berengaria of Castile
3. Eleanor of Castile
14. Simon de Dammartin
7. Joan, Countess of Ponthieu
15. Marie, Countess of Ponthieu

== Sources ==
- Green, Mary Anne Everett (1857). Lives of the Princesses of England. Vol. III. London: Henry Colburn. pp. 1–59.
- Verity, Brad. "The Children of Elizabeth, Countess of Hereford, Daughter of Edward I of England", Foundations, Volume 6, June 2014, pages 3–10.
