= Lord High Constable of England =

Ceremonial office, Great Officer of State

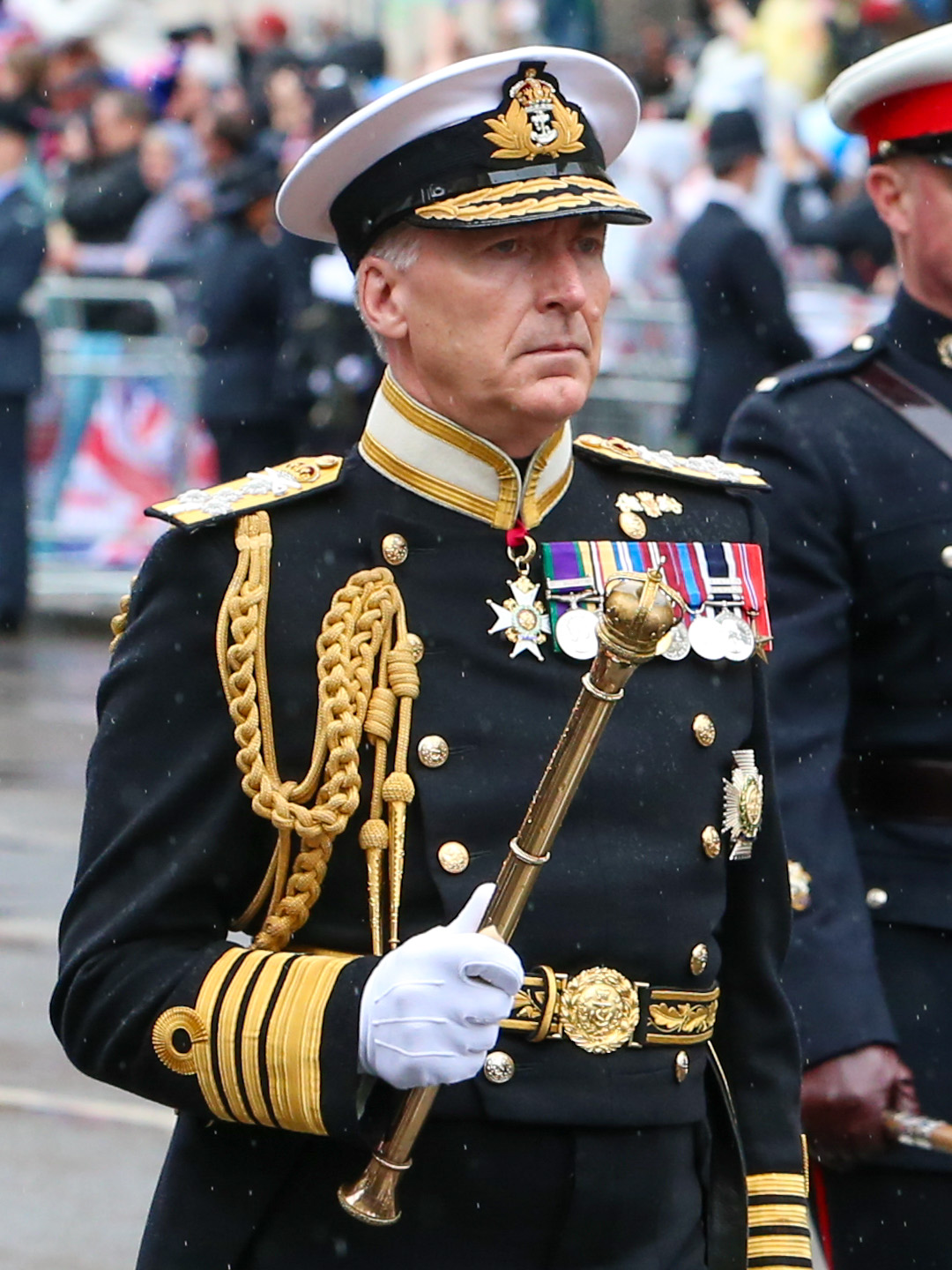
- Admiral Sir Tony Radakin with the Lord High Constable's baton at the coronation of Charles III and Camilla in 2023
- Type: Great Officer of State
- Appointer: The Monarch
- Term length: At His Majesty's pleasure
- Formation: 1139
- First holder: Miles of Gloucester, 1st Earl of Hereford

The Lord High Constable of England is the seventh of the Great Officers of State, ranking beneath the Lord Great Chamberlain and above the Earl Marshal. This office is now called out of abeyance only for coronations. The Lord High Constable was originally the commander of the royal armies and the Master of the Horse. He was also, in conjunction with the Earl Marshal, president of the court of chivalry or court of honour. In feudal times, martial law was administered in the court of the Lord High Constable.

The constableship was granted as a grand serjeanty with the Earldom of Hereford by the Empress Matilda to Miles of Gloucester, and was carried by his heiress to the Bohuns, earls of Hereford and Essex. They had a surviving male heir, and still have heirs male, but due to the power of the monarchy the constableship was irregularly given to the Staffords, Dukes of Buckingham; and on the attainder of Edward Stafford, 3rd Duke of Buckingham, in the reign of Henry VIII, it became merged into the Crown. Since that point it has not existed as a separate office, except as a temporary appointment for the coronation of a monarch or in the event of a trial by combat (albeit only one pro tempore appointment was made in such circumstances, in 1631, and the trial subsequently did not take place); in other circumstances the Earl Marshal exercises the traditional duties of the office.

The Lacys and Verduns were hereditary constables of Ireland from the 12th to the 14th century; and the Hays, earls of Erroll, have been hereditary Lord High Constables of Scotland from early in the 14th century.

== Lord High Constables of England, 1139–1521 ==
- 1139–1143: Miles of Gloucester, 1st Earl of Hereford
- 1143–1155: Roger Fitzmiles, 2nd Earl of Hereford
- 1155–1159: Walter of Hereford
- 1159–1164: Henry Fitzmiles
- 1164–1176: Humphrey III de Bohun
- 1176–1220: Henry de Bohun, 1st Earl of Hereford
- 1220–1275: Humphrey de Bohun, 2nd Earl of Hereford and 1st Earl of Essex
- 1275–1298: Humphrey de Bohun, 3rd Earl of Hereford
- 1298–1322: Humphrey de Bohun, 4th Earl of Hereford
- 1322–1336: John de Bohun, 5th Earl of Hereford
- 1336–1361: Humphrey de Bohun, 6th Earl of Hereford
- 1361–1373: Humphrey de Bohun, 7th Earl of Hereford, 6th Earl of Essex and 2nd Earl of Northampton

A cousin was alive who was not granted the titles due to him and his heirs: Gilbert de Bohun, died 1381

- 1373–1397: Thomas of Woodstock, 1st Duke of Gloucester (5th surviving son of King Edward III and husband of Eleanor de Bohun, elder daughter and co-heiress of Humphrey de Bohun, 7th Earl of Hereford)
- 1397–1399: Humphrey, 2nd Earl of Buckingham
- 1399–1403: Henry Percy, 1st Earl of Northumberland
- 1403–?: John of Lancaster, 1st Duke of Bedford (died 1435)
- 1445–1450: John Beaumont, 1st Viscount Beaumont (died 1460)
- ?–1455: Edmund Beaufort, 2nd Duke of Somerset
- 1455: Humphrey Stafford, 1st Duke of Buckingham
- 1455–1456: Richard, Duke of York
- 1456–1460: Humphrey Stafford, 1st Duke of Buckingham
- 1461–1467: John Tiptoft, 1st Earl of Worcester
- 1467–1469: Richard Woodville, 1st Earl Rivers
- 1469–1470: Richard, Duke of Gloucester
- 1470–1471: John de Vere, 13th Earl of Oxford
- 1471–1483: Richard, Duke of Gloucester
- 1483: Henry Stafford, 2nd Duke of Buckingham
- 1483–1504: Thomas Stanley, 2nd Baron Stanley
- 1504–1521: Edward Stafford, 3rd Duke of Buckingham

== Lord High Constables of England, 1522–present ==
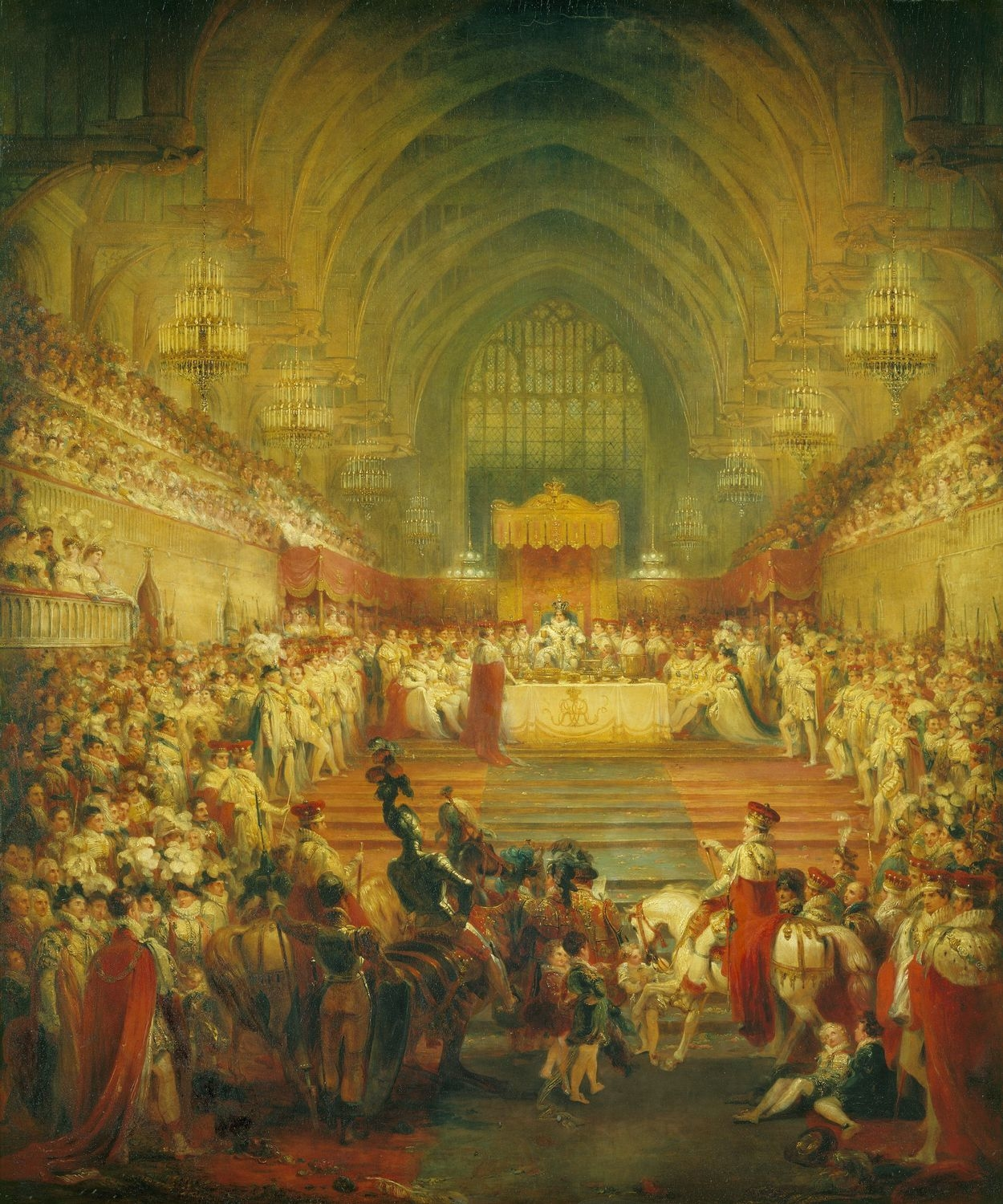
The Banquet at the Coronation of George IV in 1821. The Duke of Wellington played a ceremonial role as Lord High Constable.

At this point, the office merged with the Crown and was revived only for coronations. It was held at coronations by the following individuals:

Name	Year	Notes	Sources
Henry Grey, 3rd Marquess of Dorset	1547	coronation of Edward VI	
Henry FitzAlan, 12th Earl of Arundel	1553	coronation of Mary I	
Henry FitzAlan, 12th Earl of Arundel	1559	coronation of Elizabeth I	
Edward Somerset, 4th Earl of Worcester	1603	coronation of James I and Anne	
George Villiers, 1st Duke of Buckingham	1626	coronation of Charles I	
Robert Bertie, 1st Earl of Lindsey	1631	proposed trial by combat between Donald Mackay, 1st Lord Reay and David Ramsay, Esq.	
Algernon Percy, 10th Earl of Northumberland	1661	coronation of Charles II	
Henry Fitzroy, 1st Duke of Grafton	1685	coronation of James II and Mary	
James Butler, 2nd Duke of Ormonde	1689	coronation of William III and Mary II	
Wriothesley Russell, 2nd Duke of Bedford	1702	coronation of Anne	
John Montagu, 2nd Duke of Montagu	1714	coronation of George I	
Charles Lennox, 2nd Duke of Richmond	1727	coronation of George II and Caroline	
John Russell, 4th Duke of Bedford	1761	coronation of George III and Charlotte	
Field Marshal Arthur Wellesley, 1st Duke of Wellington	1821	coronation of George IV	
Field Marshal Arthur Wellesley, 1st Duke of Wellington	1831	coronation of William IV and Adelaide	
Field Marshal Arthur Wellesley, 1st Duke of Wellington	1838	coronation of Queen Victoria	
Alexander Duff, 1st Duke of Fife	1902	coronation of Edward VII and Alexandra	
Alexander Duff, 1st Duke of Fife	1911	coronation of George V and Mary	
Robert Offley Ashburton Crewe-Milnes, 1st Marquess of Crewe	1937	coronation of George VI and Elizabeth	
Field Marshal Alan Brooke, 1st Viscount Alanbrooke	1953	coronation of Elizabeth II	
Admiral Sir Tony Radakin	2023	coronation of Charles III and Camilla	

== See also ==
- Constable of France, a similar office in France
