= Humphrey de Bohun, 4th Earl of Hereford =

13th and 14th-century Anglo-Norman nobleman (c. 1276–1322)

Humphrey de Bohun
- Earl of Hereford
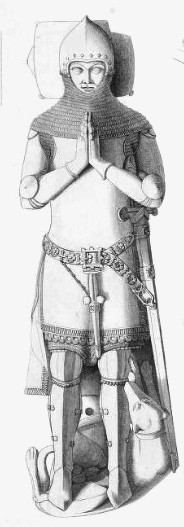
- Nineteenth-century drawing of effigy of Humphrey de Bohun, 4th Earl of Hereford, Hereford Cathedral
- Born: c. 1276
- Died: 16 March 1322 (aged 45–46); Boroughbridge, England
- Wars and battles: First War of Scottish Independence; Battle of Bannockburn; Despenser War; Battle of Boroughbridge †
- Noble family: Bohun
- Spouse: Elizabeth of Rhuddlan
- Issue: Margaret de Bohun; Humphrey de Bohun; Eleanor de Bohun, Countess of Ormonde; John de Bohun, 5th Earl of Hereford; Humphrey de Bohun, 6th Earl of Hereford; Margaret de Bohun, Countess of Devon; William de Bohun, 1st Earl of Northampton; Edward de Bohun; Agnes; Eneas de Bohun; Isabel de Bohun
- Father: Humphrey de Bohun, 3rd Earl of Hereford
- Mother: Maud de Fiennes

Humphrey VII de Bohun, 4th Earl of Hereford (c. 1276 – 16 March 1322) was a member of a powerful Anglo-Norman family of the Welsh Marches and was one of the Ordainers who opposed Edward II's excesses.

== Family background ==
Arms of Bohun: Azure, a bend argent cotised or between six lions rampant or

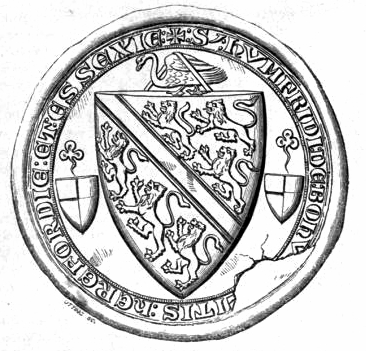
Counter seal of Humphrey de Bohun, 4th Earl of Hereford, showing the so-called "Bohun swan" above the escutcheon

Humphrey de Bohun's birth year is uncertain although several contemporary sources indicate that it was 1276. His father was Humphrey de Bohun, 3rd Earl of Hereford and his mother was Maud de Fiennes, daughter of Enguerrand II de Fiennes, chevalier, seigneur of Fiennes and Isabella of Conde. He was born at Pleshey Castle, Essex.

Humphrey (VII) de Bohun succeeded his father in 1298 as Earl of Hereford and Earl of Essex, and Constable of England (later called Lord High Constable). Humphrey held the title of Bearer of the Swan Badge, a heraldic device passed down in the Bohun family. This device did not appear on their coat of arms, (az, a bend ar cotised or, between 6 lioncels or) nor their crest (gu, doubled erm, a lion gardant crowned), but it does appear on Humphrey's personal seal (illustration).

== Scotland ==
Humphrey was one of several earls and barons under Edward I who laid siege to Caerlaverock Castle in Scotland in 1300 and later took part in many campaigns in Scotland. He also loved tourneying and gained a reputation as an "elegant" fop.

In one of the campaigns in Scotland Humphrey evidently grew bored and departed for England to take part in a tournament along with Piers Gaveston and other young barons and knights. On return, all of them fell under Edward I's wrath for desertion, but were forgiven. It is probable that Gaveston's friend, the future Edward II, had given them permission to depart. Later Humphrey became one of Gaveston's and Edward II's bitterest opponents.

He would also have been associating with young Robert Bruce during the early campaigns in Scotland, since Bruce, like many other Scots and Border men, he eventually submitted to English allegiance. Robert Bruce is closely connected to the Bohuns. Between the time that he swore his last fealty to Edward I in 1302 and his defection four years later, Bruce stayed for the most part in Annandale, rebuilding his castle of Lochmaben in stone, making use of its natural moat.

Rebelling and taking the crown of Scotland in February 1306, Bruce was fighting a war against England which went poorly for him at first, and he was forced into hiding. By 1307, the war had begun to turn in his favour. His properties in England and Scotland were confiscated and three of his brothers were executed.

Humphrey de Bohun received many of Robert Bruce's forfeited properties. It is unknown whether Humphrey was a long-time friend or enemy of Robert Bruce, but they were nearly the same age and the lands of the two families in Essex and Middlesex lay very close to each other. After Bruce's defeats, Humphrey took Lochmaben, and Edward I awarded him Annandale and the castle.

Lochmaben was retaken by the Scots in 1312 and remained in Scottish hands until 1333 when it was once more seized by the English. It remained in the hands of Humphrey's son William, Earl of Northampton, who held and defended it until his death in 1360.

The Scots retook Lochmaben again in 1385. Some Bohuns remained in Scotland, where they became known as the Bounds.

== Battle of Bannockburn ==
At the Battle of Bannockburn (23–24 June 1314), Humphrey de Bohun should have been given command of the army because that was his responsibility as Constable of England. However, since the execution of Piers Gaveston in 1312, Humphrey had been out of favour with Edward II, who gave the Constableship for the 1314 campaign to the youthful and inexperienced Earl of Gloucester, Gilbert de Clare.

Nevertheless, on the first day, Bohun insisted on being one of the first to lead the cavalry charge. In the melee and cavalry rout between the Bannock Burn and the Scots' camp, he was not injured although his rash young cousin Henry de Bohun, who could have been no older than about 22, charged alone at Robert Bruce and was killed by Bruce's axe.

On the second day, Gloucester was killed at the start of the battle. Hereford fought throughout the day, leading a large company of Welsh and English knights and archers. The archers who might have had success at breaking up the Scots schiltrons were attacked and overrun by the Scots cavalry.

When the battle was lost, Bohun retreated with the Earl of Angus and several other barons, knights and men to Bothwell Castle, seeking a safe haven. However, all the refugees who entered the castle were taken prisoner by its formerly pro-English governor, Walter fitz Gilbert, who, like many Lowland knights, declared for Bruce as soon as word came of the Scottish King's victory.

Humphrey de Bohun was ransomed by Edward II, his brother-in-law, on the pleading of Edward's wife Isabella. This was one of the most interesting ransoms in English history. The Earl was traded for Bruce's queen, Elizabeth de Burgh and daughter, Marjorie Bruce, two bishops among other important Scots captives in England. Isabella MacDuff, Countess of Buchan, who had crowned Robert Bruce in 1306 and for years had been locked in a cage outside Berwick, was not included; presumably, she had died in captivity.

== Ordainer ==
Like his father, grandfather, and great-great-grandfather, this Humphrey de Bohun was careful to insist that the king obey Magna Carta and other baronially established safeguards against monarchic tyranny. He was a leader of the reform movements that promulgated the Ordinances of 1311 and fought to insure their execution.

The subsequent revival of royal authority and the growing ascendancy of the Despensers (Hugh the elder and younger) led Bohun and other barons to rebel against the king again in 1322. Bohun had a special reason for opposing the Despensers, for he had lost some of his estates in the Welsh Marches to their rapacity and he felt they had besmirched his honour. In 1316 Bohun had been ordered to lead the suppression of the revolt of Llywelyn Bren in Glamorgan which he did successfully. When Llewelyn surrendered to him the Earl promised to intercede for him and fought to have him pardoned. Instead Hugh the younger Despenser had Llewelyn executed without a proper trial. Hereford and the other marcher lords used Llywelyn Bren's death as a symbol of Despenser tyranny.

== Death at Boroughbridge ==
The rebel forces were halted by loyalist troops at the wooden bridge at Boroughbridge, Yorkshire, where Humphrey de Bohun, leading an attempt to storm the bridge, met his death on 16 March 1322.

Although the details have been called into question by a few historians, his death may have been particularly gory. As recounted by Ian Mortimer:

"[The 4th Earl of] Hereford led the fight on the bridge, but he and his men were caught in the arrow fire. Then one of de Harclay's pikemen, concealed beneath the bridge, thrust upwards between the planks and skewered the Earl of Hereford.......twisting the head of the iron pike into his intestines. His dying screams turned the advance into a panic."

Humphrey de Bohun may have contributed to the failure of the reformers' aims. There is evidence that he suffered for some years, especially after his countess's death in 1316, from clinical depression.

== Marriage and children ==
His marriage to Elizabeth of Rhuddlan daughter of King Edward I of England and his first wife, Eleanor of Castile, on 14 November 1302, at Westminster gained him the lands of Berkshire.

Elizabeth had an unknown number of children, probably eleven, by Humphrey de Bohun.

Until the earl's death the boys of the family, and possibly the girls, were given a classical education under the tutelage of a Sicilian Greek, Master "Digines" (Diogenes), who may have been Humphrey de Bohun's boyhood tutor. He was evidently well educated, a book collector and scholar, interests his son Humphrey and daughter Margaret (Courtenay) inherited.

1. Margaret de Bohun (born 1302 – died 7 Feb. 1304).
2. Humphrey de Bohun (born c. Oct. 1303 – died c. Oct. 1304).
3. Eleanor de Bohun (17 October 1304 – 1363), married, firstly, James Butler, 1st Earl of Ormonde, and, secondly, Thomas Dagworth, 1st Baron Dagworth.
4. John de Bohun, 5th Earl of Hereford (About 1307 – 1336)
5. Humphrey de Bohun, 6th Earl of Hereford (About 1309 to 1311 – 1361).
6. Margaret de Bohun (3 April 1311 – 16 December 1391), married Hugh Courtenay, 2nd Earl of Devon. Gave birth to about 16 to 18 children (including an archbishop, a sea commander and pirate, and more than one Knight of the Garter) and died at the age of eighty.
7. William de Bohun, 1st Earl of Northampton (About 1310–1312 –1360). Twin of Edward. Married Elizabeth de Badlesmere, daughter of Bartholomew de Badlesmere, 1st Baron Badlesmere and Margaret de Clare, by whom he had issue.
8. Edward de Bohun (About 1310–1312 –1334). Twin of William. Married Margaret, daughter of William de Ros, 2nd Baron de Ros, but they had no children. He served in his ailing elder brother's stead as Constable of England. He was a close friend of young Edward III, and died a heroic death attempting to rescue a drowning man-at-arms from a Scottish river while on campaign.
9. Agnes, (About 1313), married Robert de Ferrers, 2nd Baron Ferrers of Chartley, son of John de Ferrers, 1st Baron Ferrers of Chartley.
10. Eneas de Bohun, (Birth date unknown, died after 1322, when he's mentioned in his father's will). Some sources have him dying in 1331.
11. Isabel de Bohun (b. ? May 1316). Elizabeth died in childbirth, and this child died on that day or very soon after. Buried with her mother in Waltham Abbey, Essex.

== See also ==
- Margaret's, late wife of Edward de Bohun, Inquisition Post Mortem No. 321 dated 1341–2.

== Notes ==
Political offices
Preceded by The Earl of Hereford and Essex	Lord High Constable; 1298–1322	Succeeded by The Earl of Hereford and Essex
Peerage of England
Preceded by Humphrey de Bohun	Earl of Hereford; Earl of Essex; 1298–1322	Succeeded by John de Bohun
