= Robert Devereux, 17th Viscount Hereford =

British peer (1865–1952)

The Right Honourable The Viscount Hereford
- Born: 11 August 1865
- Died: 16 April 1952 (aged 86); Hampton Court Castle, Herefordshire
- Known for: Premier Viscount of England; KStJ
- Spouse: Ethel Shaw (m. 1892–1945)

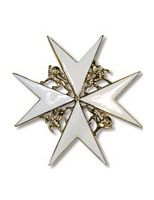

Robert Charles Devereux, 17th Viscount Hereford (11 August 1865 – 16 April 1952) was an English member of the House of Lords and Premier Viscount of England.

== Life ==
Lord Hereford was born in 1865, the only son of Robert Devereux, 16th Viscount Hereford and The Hon. Mary Morgan, youngest daughter of Charles, 1st Baron Tredegar (1843–1924).

He was educated at Eton and New College, Oxford.

Lord Hereford, who lived at Hampton Court, Herefordshire, was elected Alderman of Brecon County Council from 1898 until 1904. He served as a JP, DL and Chairman of Breconshire Quarter Sessions as well as being appointed KJStJ.

== Marriage and issue ==
In 1892, Lord Hereford married Ethel Mildred Hounsfield Shaw (1874–1945), daughter of John Shaw, of Welburn Hall, Yorkshire. The Viscountess Hereford was appointed Dame of Justice of the Order of Saint John. They had three children:

- Hon. Robert Godfrey de Bohun Devereux (24 November 1894 – 13 July 1934), whose son succeeded in the family titles
- Hon. Blanche Marion Devereux (24 April 1893 – 13 January 1976), married in 1927 Maj. Harry Talbot Rice
- Hon. Ursula Mary Ethel Devereux DJStJ (27 October 1901 – 12 August 1957), married in 1922 Brig. Felix Alexander Vincent Copland-Griffiths

== Death ==
He died at Hampton Court Castle near Leominster and at that point left British assets in probates of 1952 and 1953 of which about 1/3 being settled land totalling £85,210 (equivalent to about £2,135,000 in 2025).

== Arms ==
Coat of arms of Robert Devereux, 17th Viscount Hereford
Coronet that of a Viscount Crest Out of a Ducal Coronet Or a Talbot's Head Argent eared Gules Escutcheon Argent a Fess Gules in chief three Torteaux Supporters Dexter: a Talbot Argent eared Gules ducally gorged of the Last; Sinister: a Reindeer Proper horned ducally gorged and lined Or Motto Virtutis Comes Invidia Orders

== See also ==
- Devereux baronets

Peerage of England
Preceded by Robert Devereux	Viscount Hereford; 1930–1952	Succeeded by Robert Devereux
