= Robert Devereux, 16th Viscount Hereford =

English peer

The Right Honourable The Viscount Hereford
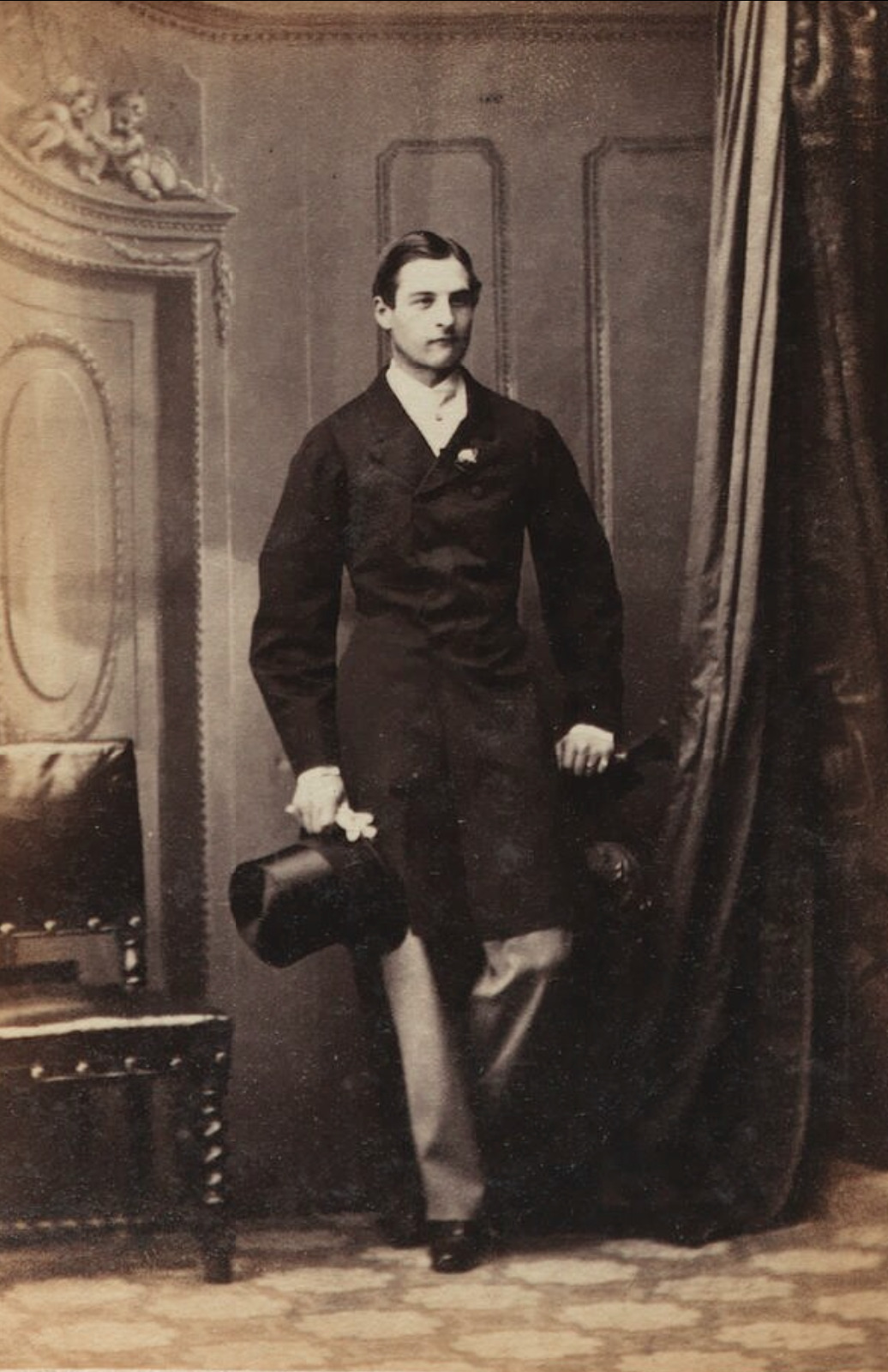
- Lord Hereford, 1863, by Camille Silvy
- Born: 3 January 1843; Mayfair, London
- Died: 27 March 1930 (aged 87); Roehampton, London
- Education: Eton College; Sandhurst
- Known for: Premier Viscount of England; Father of the House of Lords
- Spouse: Hon. Mary Anna Morgan (m. 1863–1924)

Robert Devereux, 16th Viscount Hereford JP DL (3 January 1843 – 27 March 1930) was an English peer. At age 12, he succeeded his father in the oldest extant viscountcy in the Peerage of England, becoming the Premier Viscount of England.

== Early life and education ==
Lord Hereford was born at 12, Portland Place, Mayfair, the eldest son of Rev. Robert Devereux, 15th Viscount Hereford and Emma Jemima Ravenscrot, daughter of daughter of George Ravenscrot. His father died in 1855. In 1857, his mother remarried Col. John Ireland Blackburne.

He was educated at Eton beginning in 1852 and Sandhurst. He was a JP and DL for Breconshire, a JP for Herefordshire and Radnorshire, and a county alderman for Monmouthshire.

== Marriage and issue ==
On 16 July 1863, Lord Hereford married the Hon. Mary Anna Morgan, youngest daughter of Charles Morgan, 1st Baron Tredegar. They had one son and five daughters.

- Hon. Robert Charles Devereux (1865–1952), succeeded as 17th Viscount Hereford
- Hon. Muriel Devereux (11 August 1866 – 5 July 1924), married in 1893 (Anthony) Noel Denny, of La Chripa, Puerto Oratava, Tenerife
- Hon. Eleanor Mary Devereux (20 September 1868 – 22 June 1944), married in 1906 Maj. Albert Addams-Williams OBE
- Hon. Lilian Devereux (4 September 1870 – 17 October 1959), died unmarried
- Hon. Sybil Devereux (19 January 1873 – 3 March 1892), died unmarried
- Hon. Rosamond Ela Devereux (23 July 1875 – 3 August 1945), died unmarried

The family resided at the family seat of Tregoyd House in Powys until it burned down in 1900, at which point they moved to Ashford Hall in Ashford Bowdler, Shropshire. Tregoyd was rebuilt and became the residence of their only son.

Their fourth daughter, Sybil, died in 1892, aged 19, of typhoid fever. Lady Hereford died on 14 August 1924 at Ashford Hall, five weeks after the death of their eldest daughter.

On 13 March 1930, upon the death of George Coventry, 9th Earl of Coventry, Lord Hereford succeeded as Father of the House of Lords, having been a peer for 74 years and seven months. He died two weeks later at the Priory nursing home.

== Arms ==
Coat of arms of Robert Devereux, 16th Viscount Hereford
Coronet A Coronet of a Viscount Crest Out of a Ducal Coronet Or a Talbot's Head Argent eared Gules Escutcheon Argent a Fess Gules in chief three Torteaux Supporters Dexter: a Talbot Argent eared Gules ducally gorged of the last; Sinister: a Reindeer proper horned ducally gorged and lined Or Motto Virtutis Comes Invidia

Peerage of England
Preceded by Robert Devereux	Viscount Hereford; 1855–1930	Succeeded by Robert Devereux
