= John de Bohun, 5th Earl of Hereford =

English noble

Arms of Bohun: Azure, a bend argent cotised or between six lions rampant or

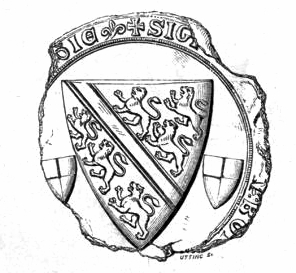
Counter seal of John de Bohun, 5th Earl of Hereford

John de Bohun, 5th Earl of Hereford (23 November 1306 – 20 January 1336) was born in St Clement's, Oxford to Humphrey de Bohun, 4th Earl of Hereford and Elizabeth of Rhuddlan, a daughter of Edward I of England.

After his father's death at the Battle of Boroughbridge, the family lands were forfeited. It was not until after the fall of the Despensers that John was permitted to succeed to his inherited position as Earl of Hereford and Essex, hereditary Constable of England, and Lord of Brecknock.

== Marriages ==
He married firstly, in 1325, to Alice FitzAlan (died 1326), daughter of Edmund FitzAlan, 2nd Earl of Arundel, and secondly to Margaret Basset (died 1355). After the marriage, it was discovered that the couple were related to the fourth degree of consanguinity and they were forced to live apart. An appeal to Pope John XXII resulted on 19 February 1331 in a papal commission to the bishops of Lichfield and London to hold an enquiry into the case. However, Roger Northburgh, the Bishop of Coventry and Lichfield, failed to act and the case was still pending when the Pope issued a further demand for an enquiry in 1334.

== Death ==
He did not play much of a public role, despite his high titles and offices, most likely because he had some sort of incapacity. His younger brothers were often deputed to fulfil his duties as Constable. He died at Kirkby Thore, Westmorland and was interred in Stratford Langthorne Abbey, London.

== Notes ==
Peerage of England
Preceded by Humphrey de Bohun	Earl of Hereford; 1322–1336	Succeeded by Humphrey de Bohun
Preceded by Humphrey de Bohun	Earl of Essex; 1322–1336	Succeeded by Humphrey de Bohun
