= Pleshey Castle =

Castle in Essex, England

Coordinates: 51.804°N 0.4140°E

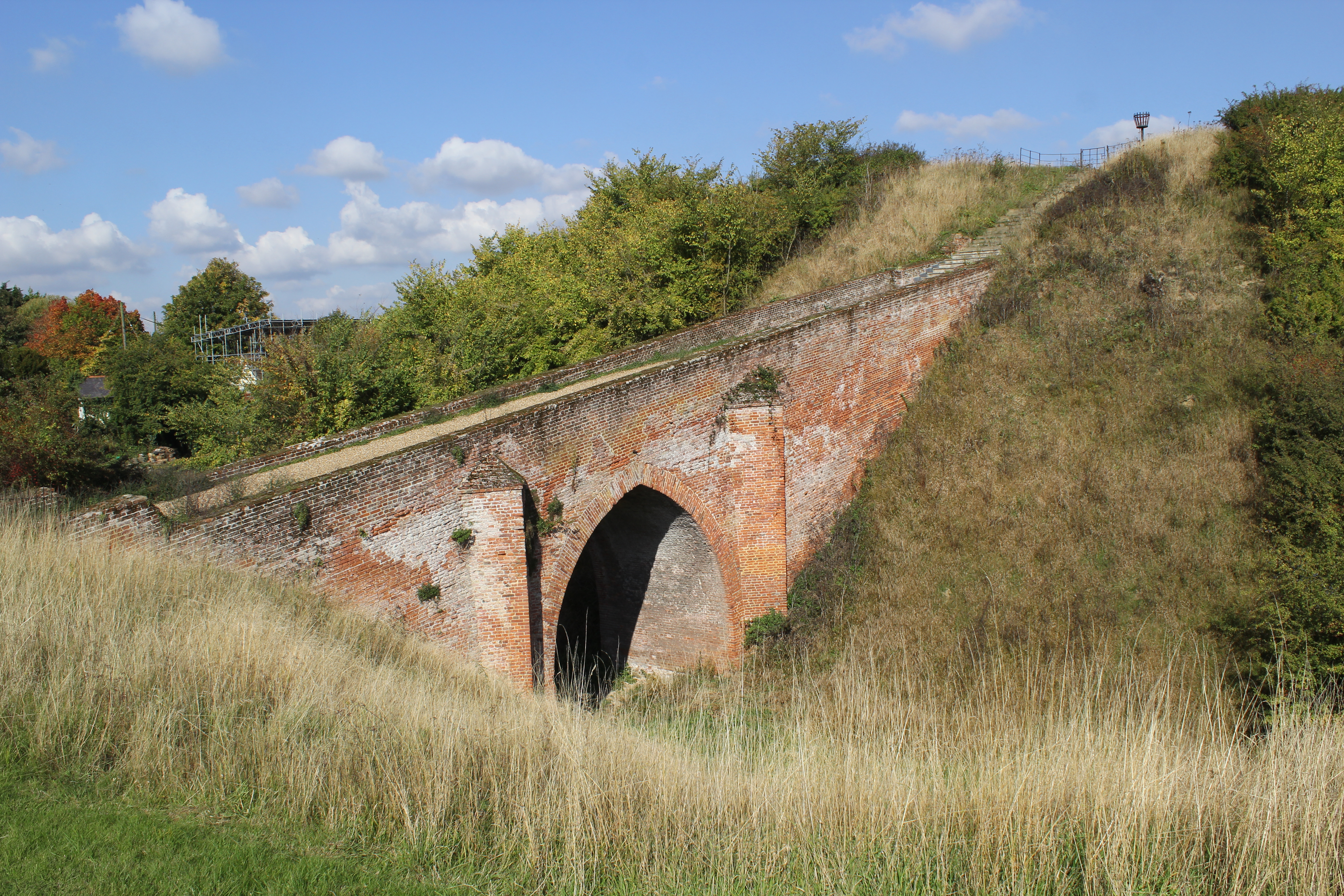
The motte and 15th-century brick bridge at Pleshey Castle

Pleshey Castle is a man-made motte and bailey castle in Pleshey in Essex, England. It was built in the 11th century and it is one of the best preserved motte and bailey castles in England.

== Construction ==
Pleshey Castle's earliest documentary reference dates from 1143, but archaeological excavation has shown that the castle was most likely completed between 1096 and 1106. It was a motte and bailey castle, which consisted of a wooden palisade and tower on a high man-made hill (motte) surrounded by two baileys (castle yard or ward) from its inception, and which at some time in the castle's early history was surrounded by a moat. The earthworks of the motte and south bailey are still extant and intact, whilst the outline of the north bailey (levelled in the 13th century and now buried beneath the modern village) can still be seen in the semi-circular street plan of the village.

The motte at Pleshey dates from c.1100, is about 15 metres high, and is one of the largest mottes in England. The medieval earthworks themselves have survived intact due to them having never been rebuilt in stone.

== History ==
The castle was dismantled in 1158 when Henry II returned the de Mandeville lands to Geoffrey III, but was subsequently rebuilt in 1167 by William II de Mandeville, which was completed following the same plan as before yet including a massively enlarged rampart enclosing the south bailey.

During the civil war that followed King John's rejection of Magna Carta, Pleshey Castle was seized by a detachment of the king's army on Christmas Eve of 1215, then subsequently recaptured by the rebel barons in the winter of 1216/7. On both occasions, it surrendered without a siege. Obsolete and demonstrably indefensible against a major attack, it became the main residence of the de Bohun family in 1227/8.

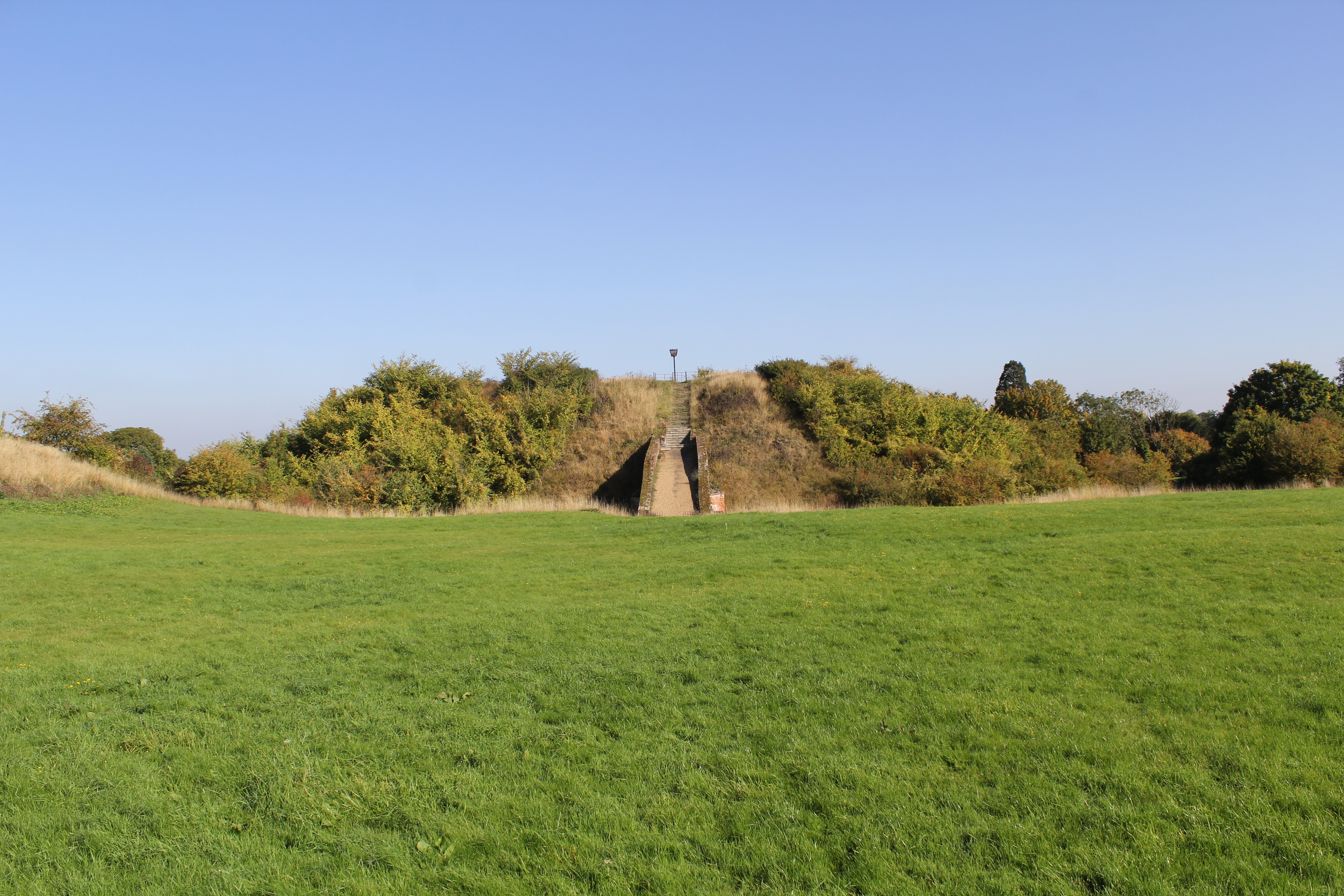
Castle motte with its medieval brick bridge at centre

Archaeological excavation has found: a chapel at the west end of the south bailey; the hall with its adjoining kitchen, pantry and buttery to the east; storehouses ranged around a kitchen yard accessible from the main gate to the north of the hall; a range of large private chambers (or 'revealing chambers' i.e. audience chambers) above a wardrobe and other storerooms to the west of the hall, which dates to 1321–1383 when the castle became part of the Duchy of Lancaster's estate); and a stone-built gatehouse at the south end of the bridge, the upper room of which can be identified as the Queen's chamber in building accounts (occupied by Duchess Eleanor de Bohun of Gloucester). The completion of these buildings has been dated to the late 14th century and are attributed to the de Bohuns and Thomas of Woodstock, 1st Duke of Gloucester.

The keep's great hall has also been located, whilst other ranges are thought to represent 'en suite' accommodation, each with their own fireplace and privy. That next to the high end of the hall would originally have been that of the lord and lady.

By the mid-15th century, the building accounts describe the great hall as the "stranger's hall", suggesting that the keep may have become guest accommodation. This could be because it was replaced in function; evidence of facility duplication exists with late-medieval halls present in both the keep and the south bailey.

The final renovation of the keep was carried out on the orders of Margaret of Anjou in 1458–1459, where the keep is referred to as a "tower" and was mainly built from the timber of at least 29 oaks, finished in flint, and later brick, facades. This renovation was completed by the building of the brick bridge over the moat between 1477–1480.

Pleshey Castle decayed and became derelict by the mid-16th century, with the motte then used as a rabbit warren; the extant bridge only survives as it was recommended by the Duchy of Lancaster's surveyors to be retained to offer access to this warren.

The castle was sold by Queen Elizabeth I in 1559. Most of the masonry was dismantled for building material in 1629, leaving just the motte and other earthworks as they are to be seen today.
