= Robert Devereux, 18th Viscount Hereford =

The Right Honourable The Viscount Hereford
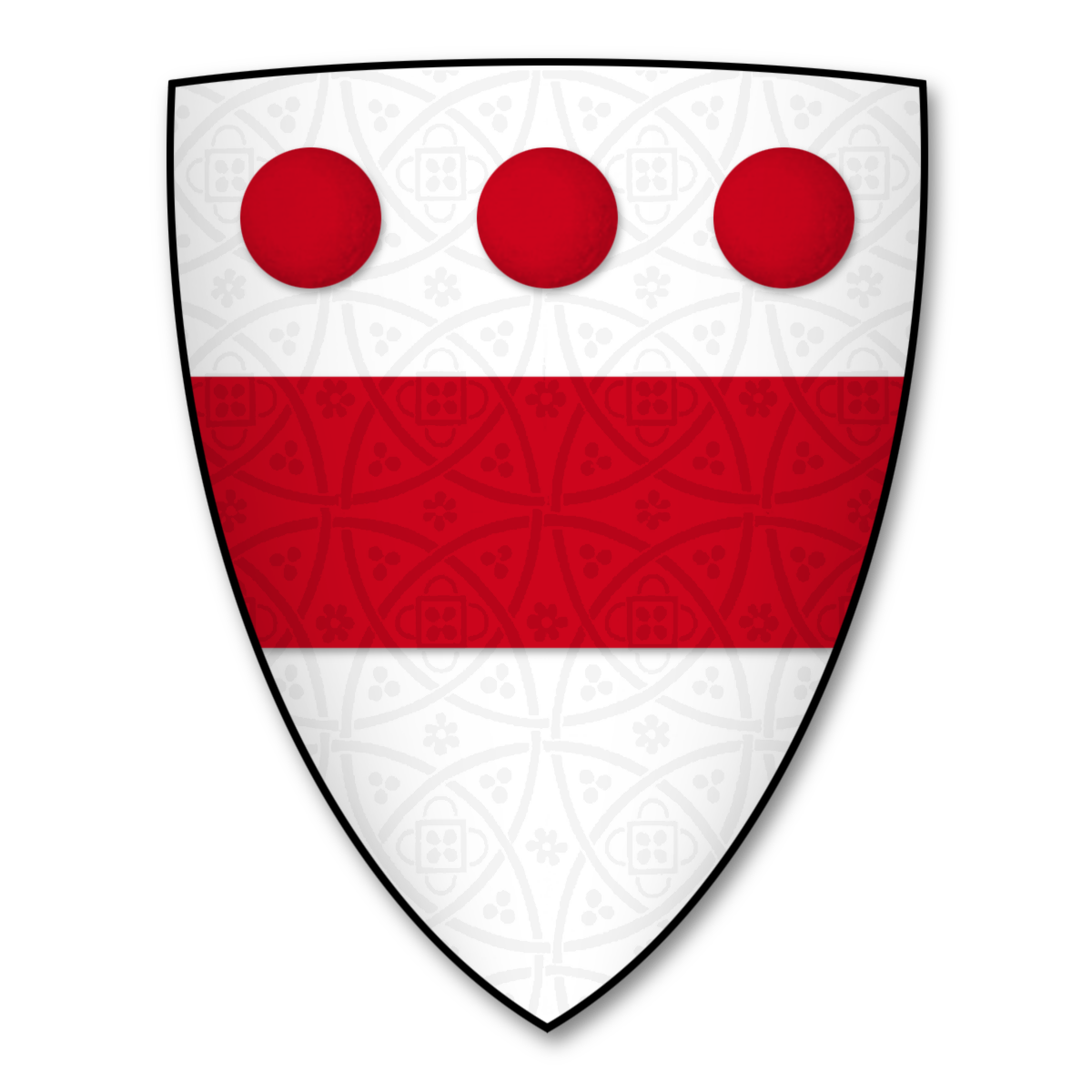
- Born: 4 November 1932
- Died: 25 February 2004 (aged 71)
- Known for: Premier Viscount of England; OStJ
- Spouse: Susan Mary née Godley

Robert Milo Leicester Devereux, 18th Viscount Hereford (4 November 1932 – 25 February 2004) was a member of the House of Lords and Premier Viscount of England.

== Life ==
Only son of The Hon. Godfrey Devereux JP (1894 † 1934), he succeeded his grandfather, the 17th Viscount Hereford, in the family titles on 16 April 1952.

Lord Hereford was educated at Eton before being commissioned in the Royal Horse Guards (1960–63). Lieut. The Viscount Hereford was appointed an Officer of the Order of St John, and later he was elected a Fellow of the Royal Philharmonic Society.

Lord Hereford lived at Hampton Court, Herefordshire with his wife Susan Mary, only child of Major Maurice Godley, ADC to the Governor of Fiji. They had two sons, the 19th Viscount Hereford and Hon. Edward Devereux, KC.

== Arms ==
Coat of arms of Robert Devereux, 18th Viscount Hereford
Coronet that of a Viscount Crest Out of a Ducal Coronet Or a Talbot's Head Argent eared Gules Escutcheon Argent a Fess Gules in chief three Torteaux Supporters Dexter: a Talbot Argent eared Gules ducally gorged of the Last; Sinister: a Reindeer Proper horned ducally gorged and lined Or Motto Virtutis Comes Invidia

== See also ==
- Devereux baronets

Peerage of England
Preceded by Robert Devereux	Viscount Hereford; 1952–2004	Succeeded by Robin Devereux
