= William de Bohun, 1st Earl of Northampton =

English nobleman (c. 1312 – 1360)

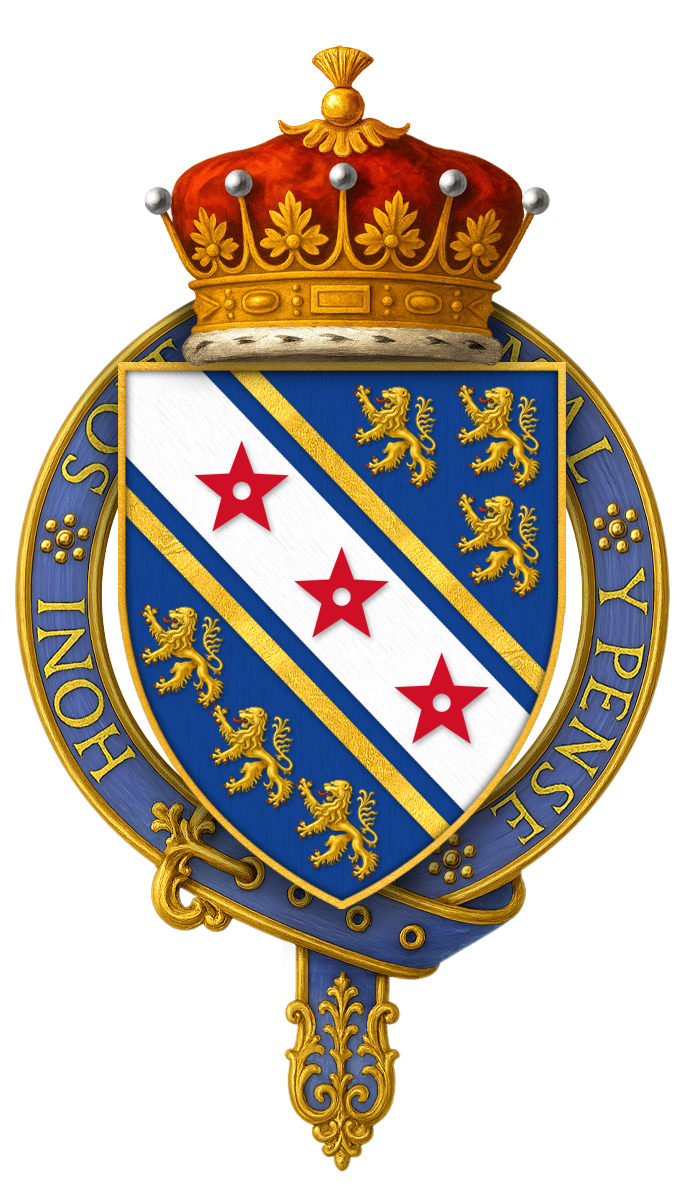
Arms of Sir William de Bohun, 1st Earl of Northampton, KG

William de Bohun, 1st Earl of Northampton, KG (c. 1312 – 16 September 1360) was an English nobleman and military commander.

== Lineage ==
William was the fifth son of Humphrey de Bohun, 4th Earl of Hereford, and Elizabeth of Rhuddlan. He had a twin brother, Edward, who drowned in a river in Scotland trying to save a man's life. Both William and Edward were close friends with their cousin, Edward III. William's maternal grandparents were Edward I of England and his first wife, Queen consort Eleanor of Castile.

== Life ==
William de Bohun assisted at the arrest of Roger Mortimer in 1330, allowing Edward III to take power. After this, he was a trusted friend and commander of the king and he participated in the renewed wars with Scotland.

In 1332, he received many new properties: Hinton and Spaine in Berkshire; Great Haseley, Ascott, Deddington, Pyrton and Kirtlington in Oxfordshire; Wincomb in Buckinghamshire; Long Bennington in Lincolnshire; Kneesol in Nottinghamshire; Newnsham in Gloucestershire, Wix in Essex, and Bosham in Sussex.

In 1335, he married Elizabeth de Badlesmere (1313 – 8 June 1356). Her parents Bartholomew de Badlesmere, 1st Baron Badlesmere, and Margaret de Clare had both turned against Edward II the decade before. Elizabeth and William were granted some of the property of Elizabeth's first husband, who had also been Mortimer's son and heir.

William was created Earl of Northampton in 1337, one of the six earls created by Edward III to renew the ranks of the higher nobility. Since de Bohun was a younger son, and did not have an income suitable to his rank, he was given an annuity until suitable estates could be found.

In 1349 he became a Knight of the Garter. He served as High Sheriff of Rutland from 1349 until his death in 1360.

== Campaigns in Flanders, Brittany, Scotland, Sluys and Crécy ==
In 1339 he accompanied the King to Flanders. He served variously in Brittany and in Scotland, and was present at the great English victories at Sluys and Crécy, the latter as a commander. His most stunning feat was leading an English force to victory against a much bigger French force at the Battle of Morlaix in 1342. Some of the details are in dispute, but it is clear that he made good use of pit traps, which stopped the French cavalry.

== Diplomat ==
In addition to being a warrior, William was a renowned diplomat. He negotiated two treaties with France, one in 1343 and one in 1350. He was also charged with negotiating in Scotland for the freedom of King David Bruce, King of Scots, who was held prisoner by the English.

== Senior naval command ==
From 8 March 1352 to 5 March 1355 he was appointed Admiral of the Northern Seas Fleet.

== Issue ==
- Humphrey de Bohun, 7th Earl of Hereford (1341–1373)
- Elizabeth de Bohun (c. 1350 – 1385); married Richard Fitzalan, 4th Earl of Arundel

== Ancestry ==
Ancestors of William de Bohun, 1st Earl of Northampton

8. Humphrey de Bohun
4. Humphrey de Bohun, 3rd Earl of Hereford
9. Eleanor de Braose
2. Humphrey de Bohun, 4th Earl of Hereford
10. Enguerrand Ingelram de Fiennes
5. Maud de Fiennes
11. Isabel de Conde
1. William de Bohun, 1st Earl of Northampton
12. Henry III of England
6. Edward I of England
13. Eleanor of Provence
3. Elizabeth of Rhuddlan
14. Ferdinand III of Castile
7. Eleanor of Castile
15. Joan, Countess of Ponthieu

== Bibliography ==
- Gee, Loveday Lewes (2002). Women, Art, and Patronage from Henry III to Edward III: 1216-1377. The Boydell Press.
- Le Melletier, Jean (1978). Les Seigneurs de Bohun. pp. 6, 17, 43–44.
- Eales, Richard; Tyas, Shaun, eds. (2003). Family and Dynasty in Late Medieval England. Shaun Tyas, Donington. p. 152.

Peerage of England
New creation	Earl of Northampton	Succeeded by Humphrey de Bohun
