= Humphrey de Bohun, 2nd Earl of Hereford =

Anglo-Norman nobleman and soldier

Humphrey de Bohun
- Earl of Hereford; Earl of Essex
- Arms of de Bohun: Azure, a bend argent cotised or between six lions rampant of the last
- Other titles: Constable of England
- Born: 1204
- Died: 24 September 1275 (aged 70–71)

Humphrey IV de Bohun, 2nd Earl of Hereford, 1st Earl of Essex (1204 – 24 September 1275) was an Anglo-Norman nobleman and soldier who served as hereditary Constable of England.

== Origins ==
He was the eldest son and heir of Henry de Bohun, 1st Earl of Hereford (1176–1220) by his wife Maud de Mandeville (alias Maud FitzGeoffrey), daughter and heiress of Geoffrey Fitz Peter, 1st Earl of Essex.

== Career ==
He was one of the nine godfathers of Prince Edward, the future King Edward I. He served as Sheriff of Kent for 1239–40. In 1258, after returning from a pilgrimage to the Holy Land, Humphrey fell away, like his father, from the royal cause to that of the barons. He served as a nominee of the opposition on the "committee of twenty-four" which was appointed in the Oxford Parliament of that year, to create the Provisions of Oxford to reform the administration. The alliance of Simon de Montfort with Llywelyn ap Gruffudd of North Wales brought Bohun back to royal allegiance. He headed the first secession of the Welsh Marchers from the party of the opposition (1263), and was among the captives whom the Montfortians took at the Battle of Lewes in 1264.

He was amongst the victors at the Battle of Evesham in 1265, which extinguished the power of de Montfort, at which, however, his eldest son, Humphrey V de Bohun, was mortally wounded. Humphrey was selected as one of the twelve arbitrators to draw up the Dictum of Kenilworth (1266), by which the disinherited rebels were allowed to make their peace.

== Marriages and issue ==
He married twice:

- Firstly, in about 1236, to Maud de Lusignan (c. 1210 – 14 August 1241), daughter of Raoul I of Lusignan, Comte d'Eu, second husband of Alix d'Eu, 8th Comtesse d'Eu. She died in 1241 and was buried at Llanthony, Gloucester, together with her husband. By Maud he had issue including:
  - Humphrey V de Bohun (died 1265), eldest son and heir apparent, who predeceased his father, having fought for De Montfort in the Battle of Evesham (1264), which he did not long survive. The earldom, therefore, passed to his son Humphrey VI de Bohun, 3rd Earl of Hereford, 2nd Earl of Essex (c. 1249 – 1298).
  - Henry de Bohun
  - Geoffrey de Bohun
  - Ralph de Bohun, Cleric;
  - Maud de Bohun, who married firstly Ansel Marshal; secondly Roger de Quincy, 2nd Earl of Winchester;
  - Alice de Bohun, who married Roger V de Toeni;
  - Eleanor de Bohun, who married Sir John de Verdun, Baron of Westmeath
- Secondly, he married Maud de Avenbury (died 8 October 1273), by whom he had two further sons:
  - John de Bohun
  - Sir Miles de Bohun

Family tree of the Earls of Essex, Earls of Hereford, and Viscounts Hereford

Godwin c. 1001–1053; Earl of Wessex
Earl of Hereford (1st creation), 1043	Earl of Hereford (3rd creation), 1058	Earl of Hereford (2nd creation), 1052	Earl of Hereford (4th creation), 1067
Sweyn Godwinson; 1020–1052; Earl of Hereford	Harold Godwinson (c. 1022–1066); Earl of Hereford, King of the English	William de Mandeville (d. before 1130)	Ralph the Timid d. 1057; Earl of Hereford	William FitzOsbern; 1011–1071; 1st Earl of Hereford
Earldom of Hereford (1st creation) forfeit, 1051	Earldom of Hereford (3rd creation) extinct, 1066	Earldom of Hereford (2nd creation) extinct, 1057
Earl of Essex (1st creation), 1140	Earl of Hereford (5th creation), 1141
William de Say I	Beatrice ("Beatrix") de Say d. 1197	Geoffrey de Mandeville d. 1144; 1st Earl of Essex	Roger de Breteuil; 1058– after 1087; 2nd Earl of Hereford	Miles of Gloucester d. 1143; 1st Earl of Hereford
Earldom of Hereford (4th creation) forfeit, 1074
William de Say II d. 1184	Geoffrey de Saye I d. 1214	Geoffrey de Mandeville d. 1166; 2nd Earl of Essex	William de Mandeville d. 1189; 3rd Earl of Essex	Margaret of Hereford; 1122/1123–1197	Roger Fitzmiles before 1125–1155; 2nd Earl of Hereford
Earldom of Essex (1st creation) extinct, 1189	Earldom of Hereford (5th creation) extinct, 1155
Earl of Essex (2nd creation), 1199
Geoffrey Fitz Peter c. 1162–1213; 1st Earl of Essex	Beatrice de Say	Geoffrey de Saye II; 1155–1230	Hawise ("Alice") de Clare	Humphrey III de Bohun before 1144–1181
Earl of Hereford (6th creation), 1199
Geoffrey FitzGeoffrey de Mandeville c. 1191–1216; 2nd Earl of Essex	William FitzGeoffrey de Mandeville d. 1227; 3rd Earl of Essex	Maud FitzGeoffrey; Maud de Mandeville	Henry de Bohun; 1176–1220; 1st Earl of Hereford
Earldom of Essex (2nd creation) extinct, 1227
Earl of Essex (3rd creation), 1239
Humphrey de Bohun; 1204–1275; 1st Earl of Essex, 2nd Earl of Hereford
Humphrey de Bohun d. 1265
Edward I 1239–1307; King of England	Humphrey de Bohun c. 1249–1298; 2nd Earl of Essex, 3rd Earl of Hereford
Edward II; 1284–1327; King of England	Elizabeth of Rhuddlan; 1282–1316	Humphrey de Bohun; 1276–1322; 3rd Earl of Essex, 4th Earl of Hereford
Edward III; 1312–1377; King of England	John de Bohun; 1306–1336; 4th Earl of Essex, 5th Earl of Hereford	Humphrey de Bohun; 1309–1361; 5th Earl of Essex, 6th Earl of Hereford	William de Bohun c. 1312–1360; 1st Earl of Northampton
Humphrey de Bohun; 1342–1373; 6th Earl of Essex, 7th Earl of Hereford
Earldom of Essex (3rd creation) and Earldom of Hereford (6th creation) extinct, 1373
Earl of Essex (4th creation), 1376
Thomas of Woodstock; 1355–1397; Earl of Essex	Eleanor de Bohun c. 1366–1399	Mary de Bohun c. 1369/1370–1394	Henry IV; 1367–1413; King of England
Earldom of Essex (4th creation) forfeit, 1397
William Bourchier; 1374–1420	Anne of Gloucester; 1383–1438
Earl of Essex (5th creation), 1461
Henry Bourchier c. 1404/1406–1483; 1st Earl of Essex
William Bourchier d. 1480; Viscount Bourchier	Anne Woodville; 1438–1489	Elizabeth Woodville c. 1437–1492	Edward IV; 1442–1483; King of England
John Devereux c. 1464–1501; 9th Baron Ferrers of Chartley	Cecily Bourchier (died c. 1492/1493)	Henry Bourchier c. 1467/80–1540; 2nd Earl of Essex	Elizabeth of York; 1466–1503	Thomas Parr; 1478–1517
Earldom of Essex (5th creation) forfeit 1540
Viscount Hereford	Earl of Essex (6th creation), 1540
Walter Devereux; 1488–1558; 1st Viscount Hereford, 10th Baron Ferrers of Chartley	Thomas Cromwell; 1485–1540; Earl of Essex	Henry VIII; 1491–1547; King of England
Earldom of Essex (6th creation) forfeit, 1540	Earl of Essex (7th creation), 1543
Richard Devereux c. 1513–1547	Catherine Parr; 1512–1548	William Parr; 1513–1571; Marquess of Northampton, Earl of Essex
Earldom of Essex (7th creation) forfeit 1553, restored 1559, extinct 1571
Earl of Essex (8th creation), 1572	Devereux Baronet of Castle Bromwich, 1611
Walter Devereux; 1541–1576; 1st Earl of Essex, 2nd Viscount Hereford	Edward Devereux c. 1550–1622; 1st Baronet
Robert Devereux; 1565–1601; 2nd Earl of Essex, 3rd Viscount Hereford	Walter Devereux; 1578–1658; 5th Viscount Hereford, 2nd Baronet	George Devereux c. 1581–1665
Earldom of Essex forfeit, 1601
Earldom of Essex (8th creation) restored, 1604	Baron Capell of Hadham, 1641
Robert Devereux; 1591–1646; 3rd Earl of Essex, 4th Viscount Hereford	Arthur Capell; 1604–1649; 1st Baron Capell of Hadham	Leicester Devereux; 1617–1676; 6th Viscount Hereford, 3rd Baronet
Earldom of Essex (8th creation) extinct, 1646
Earl of Essex (9th creation) and Viscount Malden, 1661	Baron Capell of Tewkesbury in the County of Gloucester, 1692
Arthur Capell; 1631–1683; 2nd Baron Capell of Hadham; 1st Earl of Essex, etc.	Henry Capell; 1638–1696; Baron Capell of Tewkesbury	Price Devereux c. 1637–1673	Vaughan Devereux d. 1700
Barony Capell of Tewkesbury extinct, 1696
Algernon Capell; 1670–1710; 2nd Earl of Essex, etc.	Leicester Devereux; 1674–1683; 7th Viscount Hereford, 4th Baronet	Edward Devereux; 1675–1700; 8th Viscount Hereford, 5th Baronet	Price Devereux; 1664–1740; 9th Viscount Hereford, 6th Baronet	Arthur Devereux d. 1711
William Capell; 1697–1743; 3rd Earl of Essex, etc.	Price Devereux; 1694–1748; 10th Viscount Hereford, 7th Baronet	Edward Devereux c. 1710–1760; 11th Viscount Hereford, 8th Baronet
Frances Hanbury-Williams c. 1735–1759	William Capell; 1732–1799; 4th Earl of Essex, etc.	Harriet Bladen; 1735–1821	Edward Devereux; 1740–1783; 12th Viscount Hereford, 9th Baronet	George Devereux; 1744–1804; 13th Viscount Hereford, 10th Baronet
George Capel-Coningsby; 1757–1839; 5th Earl of Essex, etc.	John Thomas Capell; 1769–1819	Henry Fleming Lea Devereux; 1777–1843; 14th Viscount Hereford, 11th Baronet
Arthur Algernon Capell; 1803–1892; 6th Earl of Essex, etc.	Algernon Capell; 1807–1886	Adolphus Capell; 1813–1899	Henry Devereux; 1807–1839	Robert Devereux; 1809–1855; 15th Viscount Hereford, 12th Baronet
Arthur de Vere Capell; 1826–1879 styled Viscount Malden	Charles Capell; 1845–1924	Horatio Bladen Capell; 1839–1933	Robert Devereux; 1843–1930; 16th Viscount Hereford, 13th Baronet
George Devereux de Vere Capell; 1857–1916; 7th Earl of Essex, etc.	Arthur Algernon de Vere Capell; 1891–1950	Horace Charles George Arthur Capell; 1868–1953	Algernon Essex Capell; 1869–1952	Henry Addison Devereux Capell 1873–1925	Robert Charles Devereux; 1865–1952; 17th Viscount Hereford, 14th Baronet
Algernon George de Vere Capell; 1884–1966; 8th Earl of Essex, etc.	Bladen Ozro Capell; 1897–1959	Algernon Arthur Capell; 1903–1950	Robert Capell b. 1903	Robert Devereux; 1894–1934
Earldom of Essex (9th creation) revived, 1989
Reginald George de Vere Capell; 1906–1981; 9th Earl of Essex, etc.	Robert Edward de Vere Capell; 1920–2005; 10th Earl of Essex, etc.	Bladen Horace Capell; 1922–1978	Colin Algernon Andrew Capell b. 1935	Robert Milo Leicester Devereux; 1932–2004; 18th Viscount Hereford, 15th Baronet
Earldom of Essex (9th creation) dormant, 1981
Frederick Paul de Vere Capell b. 1944; 11th Earl of Essex, etc.	William Jennings "Bill" Capell b. 1952	Clint Andrew Devereaux Capell b. 1960	Craig Robert Lawrence Capell b. 1962
Heir presumptive to the Earldom of Essex	Third in line to the Earldom of Essex	Fourth in line to the Earldom of Essex
Kevin Capell b. 1982	Dylan Colin David Capell b. 1987	Charles Robin de Bohun Devereux b. 1975; 19th Viscount Hereford, 16th Baronet
Second in line to the Earldom of Essex	Fifth in line to the Earldom of Essex
Henry Devereux b. 2015
Heir apparent to the Hereford Viscountcy

== Death and burial ==
He died in 1275 in Warwickshire and was buried at Llanthony Secunda in Gloucester. He was succeeded by his grandson Humphrey VI de Bohun (c. 1249 – 1298).

== Notes ==
Peerage of England
Preceded by Henry de Bohun	Earl of Hereford; 1220–1275	Succeeded by Humphrey VI de Bohun
New creation	Earl of Essex; 1239–1275	Succeeded by Humphrey VI de Bohun
Political offices
Preceded by Henry de Bohun	Lord High Constable; 1220–1275	Succeeded by Humphrey VI de Bohun
