= Viscount Hereford =

Title in the Peerage of England

- Argent, a fess gules in chief three torteaux
- Creation date: 2 February 1550
- Created by: Edward VI
- Peerage: England
- First holder: Walter Devereux, 10th Baron Ferrers of Chartley
- Present holder: Robin Devereux, 19th Viscount Hereford
- Heir apparent: The Hon. Henry Devereux
- Remainder to: Heirs male of the first viscount's body, lawfully begotten
- Former seats: Hampton Court; Castle Bromwich Hall
- Motto: Virtutis comes invidia ("Envy is the attendant of virtue")

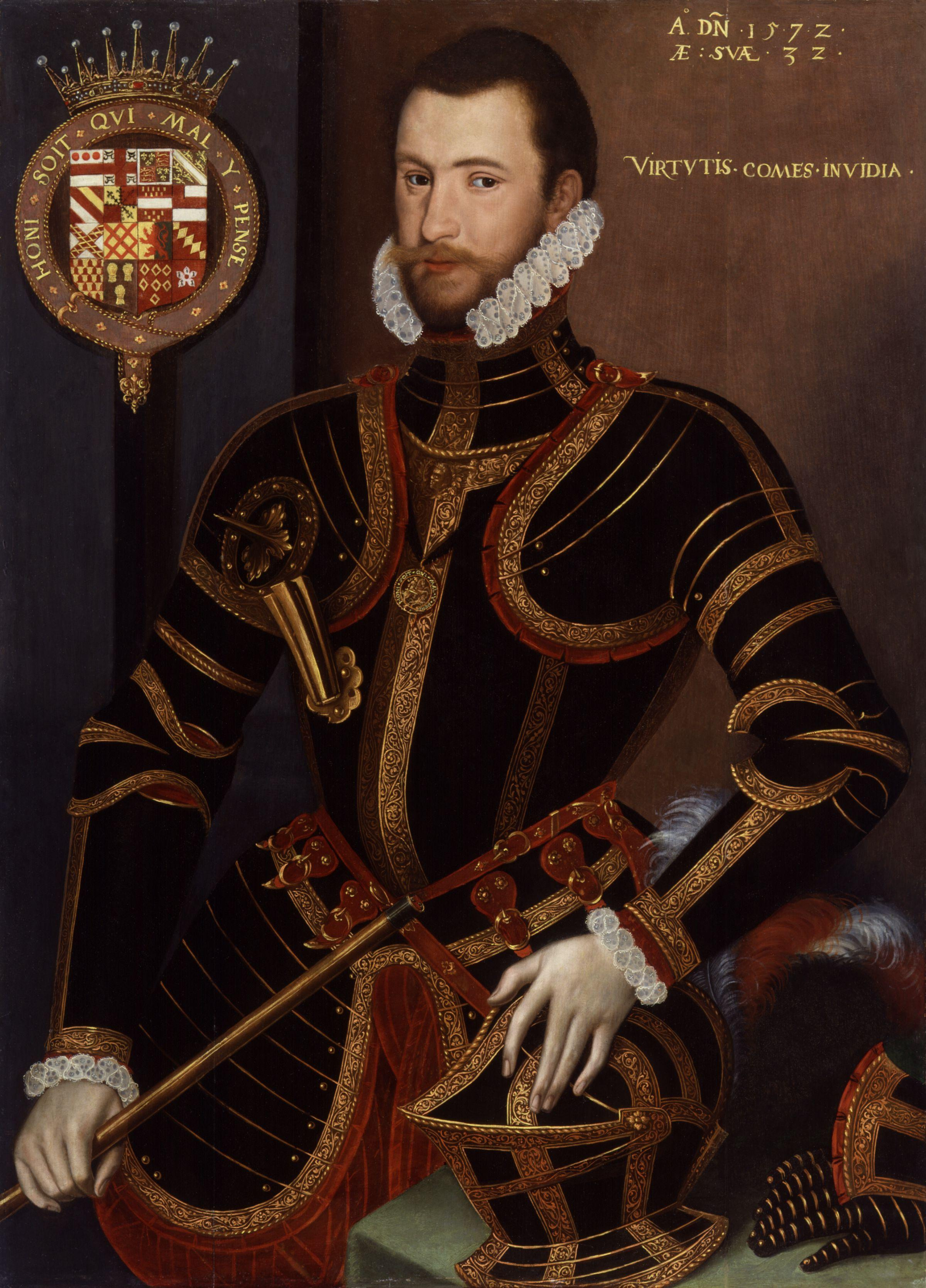
Walter Devereux, 1st Earl of Essex and 2nd Viscount Hereford

Viscount Hereford is the oldest extant viscountcy in the Peerage of England, making the holder the Premier Viscount of England. The title was created in 1550 for Walter Devereux, 10th Baron Ferrers of Chartley.

== History ==
The Devereux (/ˈdɛvəruːks/) family is of French Norman descent and came to England after the Norman conquest in 1066 – this branch lorded over Lyonshall and Bodenham, Herefordshire, as their main estates. Sir Walter Devereux (died 1485) married Anne Ferrers, 8th Baroness Ferrers of Chartley (d. 1469) (see the Baron Ferrers of Chartley for earlier history of this title). He was summoned to Parliament as Lord Ferrers of Chartley in her right. Devereux was killed at the Battle of Bosworth in 1485, fighting on the side of King Henry VII. Their son, the eighth Baron, married Cicely, daughter of William Bourchier, Viscount Bourchier, son of Henry Bourchier, 1st Earl of Essex and 5th Baron Bourchier) (see the Baron Bourchier for more information on the Bourchier family). He was succeeded by his son, the ninth Baron, who served with distinction in the French Wars of King Henry VIII and was honoured in 1550 when he was created Viscount Hereford in the Peerage of England.

He was succeeded by a grandson, the son of his second son, Hon. Sir Richard Devereux. This latter Walter Devereux was also a prominent soldier during the reign of Queen Elizabeth I. Lord Hereford was a Field Marshal of the forces sent to quell the Northern Rebellion of 1569 and led an expedition to occupy Ulster in 1573. In 1570, he succeeded his first cousin twice removed as eighth Baron Bourchier in right of his great-grandmother Cecily Bourchier. In 1572, the earldom of Essex held by the Bourchier family (which had become extinct in 1540) was revived when he was created Earl of Essex in the Peerage of England. On his death the titles passed to his son Robert, the second Earl. He was the highly trusted courtier, soldier and favourite of Queen Elizabeth I. However, Lord Essex after many years defied the Queen and tried to raise a rebellion in London. He was condemned to death for high treason and beheaded in the Tower of London on 25 February 1601. His titles were forfeited. However, his son Robert was restored in blood in 1603 and became the third Earl. He later fought as a Parliamentarian in the Civil War, leading the Parliamentary forces against Charles I at the Battle of Edgehill, the first major battle of the Civil War. He died on 14 September 1646 and was buried in Westminster Abbey on the 19 October, both Houses of Parliament attending the funeral. On Lord Essex's death the earldom of Essex became extinct. The barony of Ferrers of Chartley and barony of Bourchier fell into abeyance. leaving the viscountcy alone continuing (extant).

The Hereford viscountcy was inherited by the 4th Viscount's cousin, Sir Walter Devereux, 2nd Baronet, who became the 5th Viscount Hereford. He had previously represented in different parliaments Worcester, Tamworth and Lichfield in the House of Commons.

The titles descended from father to son until the death of his grandson, the seventh Viscount, in 1683. This Viscount died at the age of nine and was succeeded by his younger brother, the eighth Viscount. He died childless at an early age and was succeeded by his second cousin once removed, the ninth Viscount. He was the great-grandson of Sir George Devereux, brother of the fifth Viscount, and had served as Member of Parliament for Montgomery prior to his succession in 1700. He was Lord-Lieutenant of Montgomeryshire 1711–14.

His son, the 10th Viscount, represented Montgomery in Parliament for over 20 years until his succession in 1740. He died without male issue and was succeeded by his kinsman, the 11th Viscount. He was a great-great-grandson of Sir George Devereux mentioned.

Lord Hereford was succeeded by his eldest son, the 12th Viscount. He was childless and on his death in 1783 the titles passed to his younger brother, the 13th Viscount, who moved the principal Welsh seat of the viscountcy from Montgomeryshire to Pencoyd in Herefordshire. He was succeeded by his son, the 14th Viscount. He was a Tory politician and served under the Duke of Wellington as Captain of the Honourable Band of Gentlemen Pensioners from 1828 to 1830 and under Sir Robert Peel as Captain of the Honourable Corps of Gentlemen-at-Arms from 1834 to 1835.

The 15th Viscount, the Reverend Robert, was an Hon. Canon of Durham. Then Robert Devereux, 16th Viscount Hereford succeeded in 1855; educated at Eton College and at Royal Military College, Sandhurst; he was a Justice of the peace, & Deputy lieutenant for Brecon, & JP for Hereford & Radnor. From 1924, the 17th Viscount resided at Hampton Court, Herefordshire, which was sold by his grandson, the 18th Viscount, in 1972. The 18th Viscount instead chose to make his home at Haseley Court, Oxfordshire, which he relinquished in 1982, when he settled at Lyford Cay, near Nassau, in the Bahamas.

The titles are held by the 19th Viscount, who succeeded his father in 2004.

The Devereux baronetcy, of Castle Bromwich in the County of Warwick, was created in the Baronetage of England in 1611 for the Hon. Edward Devereux, seated at Castle Bromwich Hall, landowner and the fourth son of the first Viscount Hereford. He had briefly served Tamworth in the House of Commons. His eldest son succeeded his first cousin twice removed downwards as fifth Viscount Hereford in 1646.

The viscountcy of Hereford is the senior viscountcy in the Peerage of England. The Viscount Hereford is also the only one of the English Viscounts who does not hold a higher title.

== Viscounts Hereford (1550) ==
Arms of John Devereux from the Gelre Armorial, folio 59r

- Walter Devereux, 1st Viscount Hereford (1489–1558)
  - Hon. Sir Richard Devereux (died 1547)
    - Walter Devereux, 2nd Viscount Hereford (1539–1576) (created Earl of Essex in 1572)
  - Sir William Devereux of Merevale Abbey
  - Henry Devereux
  - Hon. Edward Devereux created 1st Baronet see below

=== Earls of Essex (1572) ===
Quartered arms of the Devereux, Earls of Essex, showing their descent from the Bourchiers, the Bohuns, and Thomas of Woodstock, Duke of Gloucester, son of Edward III: Quarterly of sixteen: 1st Argent a fess Gules in chief three torteaux for Devereux; 2nd Argent a cross engrailed Gules between four water bougets Sable for Bourchier; 3rd quarterly France modern and England within a border Argent for Woodstock; 4th Azure a bend Argent double edged Sable (should be coticed Or) between six lions rampant Or for Bohun; 5th Gules two bends that in chief Or that in base Argent for Milo; 6th quarterly Or and Gules overall an escarbuncle Sable for Mandeville; 7th Gules a fess Argent between fifteen billets five four three two and one Or for Lovain/Louvain; 8th Argent a fess and quarter conjoined Gules for Woodville/Wydvile; 9th Argent a saltire Gules fretty Or for Crophull; 10th Argent a fret Gules for Verdun; 11th per pale Or and Vert overall a lion rampant Gules for Marshal; 12th Gules five lozenges in bend Or for Marshal; 13th vairy Or and Gules for Ferrers; 14th Azure three garbs Or for Chester; 15th Gules seven mascles conjoined three three and one Argent for Quincy (Ferrers); 16th Gules a cinquefoil pierced Ermine for Beaumont/Bellomont

- Walter Devereux, 1st Earl of Essex, 2nd Viscount Hereford (1539–1576) (see above)
- Robert Devereux, 2nd Earl of Essex, 3rd Viscount Hereford (1566–1601)
- Robert Devereux, 3rd Earl of Essex, 4th Viscount Hereford (1591–1646)
  - Robert Devereux, Viscount Hereford (1632 – c. 1638)

=== Viscounts Hereford (1550; reverted) ===
- Walter Devereux, 5th Viscount Hereford (1578–1658)
- Leicester Devereux, 6th Viscount Hereford (1617–1676)
- Leicester Devereux, 7th Viscount Hereford (1674–1683)
- Edward Devereux, 8th Viscount Hereford (1675–1700)
- Price Devereux, 9th Viscount Hereford (1664–1740)
- Price Devereux, 10th Viscount Hereford (1694–1748)
- Edward Devereux, 11th Viscount Hereford (c. 1710 – 1760)
- Edward Devereux, 12th Viscount Hereford (1740–1783)
- George Devereux, 13th Viscount Hereford (1744–1804)
- Henry Devereux, 14th Viscount Hereford (1777–1843)
  - Hon. Henry Cornewall Devereux (1807–1839)
- Robert Devereux, 15th Viscount Hereford (1809–1855)
- Robert Devereux, 16th Viscount Hereford (1843–1930)
- Robert Charles Devereux, 17th Viscount Hereford (1865–1952)
  - Hon. Robert Godfrey de Bohun Devereux (1894–1934)
- Robert Milo Leicester Devereux, 18th Viscount Hereford (1932–2004)
- (Charles) Robin de Bohun Devereux, 19th Viscount Hereford (born 1975)

The heir apparent is the present holder's son, the Hon. Henry Walter de Bohun Devereux (born 2015).

== Devereux baronets, of Castle Bromwich (1611) ==
- Sir Edward Devereux, 1st Baronet of Castle Bromwich (c. 1550 – 1622)
  - Sir Walter Devereux, 2nd Baronet (1578–1658) (succeeded as Viscount Hereford in 1646)

== Family tree and line of succession ==
Family tree of the Earls of Essex, Earls of Hereford, and Viscounts Hereford

Godwin c. 1001–1053; Earl of Wessex
Earl of Hereford (1st creation), 1043	Earl of Hereford (3rd creation), 1058	Earl of Hereford (2nd creation), 1052	Earl of Hereford (4th creation), 1067
Sweyn Godwinson; 1020–1052; Earl of Hereford	Harold Godwinson (c. 1022–1066); Earl of Hereford, King of the English	William de Mandeville (d. before 1130)	Ralph the Timid d. 1057; Earl of Hereford	William FitzOsbern; 1011–1071; 1st Earl of Hereford
Earldom of Hereford (1st creation) forfeit, 1051	Earldom of Hereford (3rd creation) extinct, 1066	Earldom of Hereford (2nd creation) extinct, 1057
Earl of Essex (1st creation), 1140	Earl of Hereford (5th creation), 1141
William de Say I	Beatrice ("Beatrix") de Say d. 1197	Geoffrey de Mandeville d. 1144; 1st Earl of Essex	Roger de Breteuil; 1058– after 1087; 2nd Earl of Hereford	Miles of Gloucester d. 1143; 1st Earl of Hereford
Earldom of Hereford (4th creation) forfeit, 1074
William de Say II d. 1184	Geoffrey de Saye I d. 1214	Geoffrey de Mandeville d. 1166; 2nd Earl of Essex	William de Mandeville d. 1189; 3rd Earl of Essex	Margaret of Hereford; 1122/1123–1197	Roger Fitzmiles before 1125–1155; 2nd Earl of Hereford
Earldom of Essex (1st creation) extinct, 1189	Earldom of Hereford (5th creation) extinct, 1155
Earl of Essex (2nd creation), 1199
Geoffrey Fitz Peter c. 1162–1213; 1st Earl of Essex	Beatrice de Say	Geoffrey de Saye II; 1155–1230	Hawise ("Alice") de Clare	Humphrey III de Bohun before 1144–1181
Earl of Hereford (6th creation), 1199
Geoffrey FitzGeoffrey de Mandeville c. 1191–1216; 2nd Earl of Essex	William FitzGeoffrey de Mandeville d. 1227; 3rd Earl of Essex	Maud FitzGeoffrey; Maud de Mandeville	Henry de Bohun; 1176–1220; 1st Earl of Hereford
Earldom of Essex (2nd creation) extinct, 1227
Earl of Essex (3rd creation), 1239
Humphrey de Bohun; 1204–1275; 1st Earl of Essex, 2nd Earl of Hereford
Humphrey de Bohun d. 1265
Edward I 1239–1307; King of England	Humphrey de Bohun c. 1249–1298; 2nd Earl of Essex, 3rd Earl of Hereford
Edward II; 1284–1327; King of England	Elizabeth of Rhuddlan; 1282–1316	Humphrey de Bohun; 1276–1322; 3rd Earl of Essex, 4th Earl of Hereford
Edward III; 1312–1377; King of England	John de Bohun; 1306–1336; 4th Earl of Essex, 5th Earl of Hereford	Humphrey de Bohun; 1309–1361; 5th Earl of Essex, 6th Earl of Hereford	William de Bohun c. 1312–1360; 1st Earl of Northampton
Humphrey de Bohun; 1342–1373; 6th Earl of Essex, 7th Earl of Hereford
Earldom of Essex (3rd creation) and Earldom of Hereford (6th creation) extinct, 1373
Earl of Essex (4th creation), 1376
Thomas of Woodstock; 1355–1397; Earl of Essex	Eleanor de Bohun c. 1366–1399	Mary de Bohun c. 1369/1370–1394	Henry IV; 1367–1413; King of England
Earldom of Essex (4th creation) forfeit, 1397
William Bourchier; 1374–1420	Anne of Gloucester; 1383–1438
Earl of Essex (5th creation), 1461
Henry Bourchier c. 1404/1406–1483; 1st Earl of Essex
William Bourchier d. 1480; Viscount Bourchier	Anne Woodville; 1438–1489	Elizabeth Woodville c. 1437–1492	Edward IV; 1442–1483; King of England
John Devereux c. 1464–1501; 9th Baron Ferrers of Chartley	Cecily Bourchier (died c. 1492/1493)	Henry Bourchier c. 1467/80–1540; 2nd Earl of Essex	Elizabeth of York; 1466–1503	Thomas Parr; 1478–1517
Earldom of Essex (5th creation) forfeit 1540
Viscount Hereford	Earl of Essex (6th creation), 1540
Walter Devereux; 1488–1558; 1st Viscount Hereford, 10th Baron Ferrers of Chartley	Thomas Cromwell; 1485–1540; Earl of Essex	Henry VIII; 1491–1547; King of England
Earldom of Essex (6th creation) forfeit, 1540	Earl of Essex (7th creation), 1543
Richard Devereux c. 1513–1547	Catherine Parr; 1512–1548	William Parr; 1513–1571; Marquess of Northampton, Earl of Essex
Earldom of Essex (7th creation) forfeit 1553, restored 1559, extinct 1571
Earl of Essex (8th creation), 1572	Devereux Baronet of Castle Bromwich, 1611
Walter Devereux; 1541–1576; 1st Earl of Essex, 2nd Viscount Hereford	Edward Devereux c. 1550–1622; 1st Baronet
Robert Devereux; 1565–1601; 2nd Earl of Essex, 3rd Viscount Hereford	Walter Devereux; 1578–1658; 5th Viscount Hereford, 2nd Baronet	George Devereux c. 1581–1665
Earldom of Essex forfeit, 1601
Earldom of Essex (8th creation) restored, 1604	Baron Capell of Hadham, 1641
Robert Devereux; 1591–1646; 3rd Earl of Essex, 4th Viscount Hereford	Arthur Capell; 1604–1649; 1st Baron Capell of Hadham	Leicester Devereux; 1617–1676; 6th Viscount Hereford, 3rd Baronet
Earldom of Essex (8th creation) extinct, 1646
Earl of Essex (9th creation) and Viscount Malden, 1661	Baron Capell of Tewkesbury in the County of Gloucester, 1692
Arthur Capell; 1631–1683; 2nd Baron Capell of Hadham; 1st Earl of Essex, etc.	Henry Capell; 1638–1696; Baron Capell of Tewkesbury	Price Devereux c. 1637–1673	Vaughan Devereux d. 1700
Barony Capell of Tewkesbury extinct, 1696
Algernon Capell; 1670–1710; 2nd Earl of Essex, etc.	Leicester Devereux; 1674–1683; 7th Viscount Hereford, 4th Baronet	Edward Devereux; 1675–1700; 8th Viscount Hereford, 5th Baronet	Price Devereux; 1664–1740; 9th Viscount Hereford, 6th Baronet	Arthur Devereux d. 1711
William Capell; 1697–1743; 3rd Earl of Essex, etc.	Price Devereux; 1694–1748; 10th Viscount Hereford, 7th Baronet	Edward Devereux c. 1710–1760; 11th Viscount Hereford, 8th Baronet
Frances Hanbury-Williams c. 1735–1759	William Capell; 1732–1799; 4th Earl of Essex, etc.	Harriet Bladen; 1735–1821	Edward Devereux; 1740–1783; 12th Viscount Hereford, 9th Baronet	George Devereux; 1744–1804; 13th Viscount Hereford, 10th Baronet
George Capel-Coningsby; 1757–1839; 5th Earl of Essex, etc.	John Thomas Capell; 1769–1819	Henry Fleming Lea Devereux; 1777–1843; 14th Viscount Hereford, 11th Baronet
Arthur Algernon Capell; 1803–1892; 6th Earl of Essex, etc.	Algernon Capell; 1807–1886	Adolphus Capell; 1813–1899	Henry Devereux; 1807–1839	Robert Devereux; 1809–1855; 15th Viscount Hereford, 12th Baronet
Arthur de Vere Capell; 1826–1879 styled Viscount Malden	Charles Capell; 1845–1924	Horatio Bladen Capell; 1839–1933	Robert Devereux; 1843–1930; 16th Viscount Hereford, 13th Baronet
George Devereux de Vere Capell; 1857–1916; 7th Earl of Essex, etc.	Arthur Algernon de Vere Capell; 1891–1950	Horace Charles George Arthur Capell; 1868–1953	Algernon Essex Capell; 1869–1952	Henry Addison Devereux Capell 1873–1925	Robert Charles Devereux; 1865–1952; 17th Viscount Hereford, 14th Baronet
Algernon George de Vere Capell; 1884–1966; 8th Earl of Essex, etc.	Bladen Ozro Capell; 1897–1959	Algernon Arthur Capell; 1903–1950	Robert Capell b. 1903	Robert Devereux; 1894–1934
Earldom of Essex (9th creation) revived, 1989
Reginald George de Vere Capell; 1906–1981; 9th Earl of Essex, etc.	Robert Edward de Vere Capell; 1920–2005; 10th Earl of Essex, etc.	Bladen Horace Capell; 1922–1978	Colin Algernon Andrew Capell b. 1935	Robert Milo Leicester Devereux; 1932–2004; 18th Viscount Hereford, 15th Baronet
Earldom of Essex (9th creation) dormant, 1981
Frederick Paul de Vere Capell b. 1944; 11th Earl of Essex, etc.	William Jennings "Bill" Capell b. 1952	Clint Andrew Devereaux Capell b. 1960	Craig Robert Lawrence Capell b. 1962
Heir presumptive to the Earldom of Essex	Third in line to the Earldom of Essex	Fourth in line to the Earldom of Essex
Kevin Capell b. 1982	Dylan Colin David Capell b. 1987	Charles Robin de Bohun Devereux b. 1975; 19th Viscount Hereford, 16th Baronet
Second in line to the Earldom of Essex	Fifth in line to the Earldom of Essex
Henry Devereux b. 2015
Heir apparent to the Hereford Viscountcy

Line of succession (simplified)
- Henry Devereux, 14th Viscount Hereford (1777–1843)
  - Robert Devereux, 15th Viscount Hereford (1809–1855)
    - Robert Devereux, 16th Viscount Hereford (1843–1930)
      - Robert Devereux, 17th Viscount Hereford (1865–1952)
        - Hon. Robert Godfrey de Bohun Devereux (1894–1934)
          - Robert Devereux, 18th Viscount Hereford (1932–2004)
            - (Charles) Robin Devereux, 19th Viscount Hereford (born 1975)
              - (1). Hon. Henry Walter de Bohun Devereux (born 2015)
            - (2). Hon. Edward Mark de Breteuil Devereux (born 1977)
    - Hon. Henry de Bohun Devereux (1848–1909)
      - Humphrey Bourchier Devereux (1873–1921)
        - George Makgill de Bohun Devereux (1909–1976)
          - male issue and descendants in remainder
      - Godfrey Vaughan Devereux (1893–1976)
        - David de Bohun Devereux (1928–2002)
          - male issue and descendants in remainder
        - Francis Richard Devereux (1937–2014)
          - male issue and descendants in remainder
  - Rear-Admiral Hon. Walter Bourchier Devereux (1810–1868)
    - Walter de Laci Devereux (1864–1959)
      - Robert de Bohun Devereux (1897–1981)
        - Robert Humphrey Bourchier Devereux (1930–2004)
          - male issue and descendants in remainder

== Arms ==
Coat of arms of Viscount Hereford
Coronet A Coronet of a Viscount Crest Out of a Ducal Coronet Or a Talbot's Head Argent eared Gules Escutcheon Argent a Fess Gules in chief three Torteaux Supporters Dexter: a Talbot Argent eared Gules ducally gorged of the Last; Sinister: a Reindeer Proper horned ducally gorged and lined Or Motto Virtutis Comes Invidia ("Envy is the attendant of virtue")

== See also ==
- Baron Bourchier
- Baron Ferrers of Chartley
- Earl of Essex
- Lord Hereford's Knob, part of the Black Mountains of southeast Wales

Baronetage of England
Preceded by Penyston baronets	Devereux baronets 25 November 1611	Succeeded by Ridgeway baronets
