= William Capell =

William Capell may refer to:

- William Capel (died 1515), Lord Mayor of London
- William Capell, 3rd Earl of Essex (1697–1743), 3rd Earl of Essex
- William Capell, 4th Earl of Essex (1732–1799), 4th Earl of Essex
- William Capel (sportsman) (1775–1854), sportsman and priest
- William Jennings Capell (born 1952), American heir presumptive to the earldom of Essex

== See also ==
- William Kapell, pianist
