= Robert Essex =

Robert Essex may refer to:

- Robert Devereux, 2nd Earl of Essex (1565–1601), favourite courtier of Elizabeth I of England
- Robert Devereux, 3rd Earl of Essex (1591–1646), son of the above
- Robert Capell, 10th Earl of Essex (1920–2005)
- Mark James Robert Essex (1949–1973), a spree-killer
