= Hertfordshire Yeomanry =

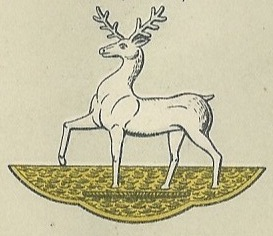
- Active: 1794–1824; 1831–2014
- Country: Kingdom of Great Britain (1794–1800); United Kingdom (1801–2014)
- Branch: Territorial Army
- Type: Yeomanry
- Role: Boer War; Yeomanry; World War I Yeomanry; World War II; Artillery; Postwar; Artillery
- Size: Boer War; One Regiment; World War I Three Regiments; World War II; Three Regiments; Postwar; Part of one Battery
- Engagements: Second Boer War; World War I Gallipoli Suez Canal Palestine World War II Battle of France Malaya Tunisia Italy Normandy North West Europe
- Battle honours: See Battle Honours below

The Hertfordshire Yeomanry was a Yeomanry Cavalry regiment of the British Army that could trace its formation to the late 18th century. First seeing mounted service in the Second Boer War and World War I, it subsequently converted to artillery. Three regiments saw service in World War II, one of which was captured at the fall of Singapore. It continued through various postwar amalgamations and its lineage was maintained by 201 (Hertfordshire and Bedfordshire Yeomanry) Battery, 100th (Yeomanry) Regiment Royal Artillery until that unit was placed in suspended animation in 2014.

== French Revolutionary and Napoleonic Wars ==
After Britain was drawn into the French Revolutionary Wars, Prime Minister William Pitt the Younger proposed on 14 March 1794 that the counties should form a force of Volunteer Yeoman Cavalry (Yeomanry) that could be called on by the King to defend the country against invasion or by the Lord Lieutenant to subdue any civil disorder within the county. By the end of the year 27 counties had raised Yeomanry, including Hertfordshire.

On 7 May 1794 the Lord Lieutenant of Hertfordshire, the Marquess of Salisbury, called a meeting at Hertford that opened a subscription list to provide arms and uniforms, and resolved to raise a force of yeomanry that could be embodied in defence of the county. The first were recruited on 21 June and by the end of the year five independent troops of 50 sabres had been raised:

- Northern Troop, commanded by Captain W. Hale of King's Walden
- Western Troop, commanded by Capt the Hon George Villiers of The Grove, Watford
- Southern Troop, commanded by Capt Sir George Prescott, 1st Baronet, of Theobalds Park, Cheshunt
- Eastern Troop, commanded by Capt John Calvert of Albury
- Centre Troop, commanded by Capt the Hon Penistone Lamb of Brocket Hall

In the spring of 1798 the threat of invasion seemed more acute, and the government encouraged the formation of local armed associations of cavalry and infantry for purely local defence. The following Volunteer Cavalry units were formed in Hertfordshire:

- Beechwood Troop, commanded by Capt Sir John Sebright, 7th Baronet, of Beechwood Park
- Sawbridgeworth Troop. commanded by Capt Michael Hankin
- A Troop was raised in the parishes of Layston, Wyddial and Throcking under Capt J.G. Franklin with the Rev John Hull as Lieutenant, but this was short-lived.
- In addition a Troop of horse or 'flying' artillery was formed to support the Yeomanry, commanded by Sir Abraham Hume, 2nd Baronet, of Wormleybury

There was little difference between the Yeomanry and the Volunteer Cavalry, and they were treated similarly. All seven Troops were on parade at Hatfield Park (the Marquess of Salisbury's country house) when the Militia, Yeomanry and Volunteers of the county were reviewed by King George III on 13 June 1800. The Yeomanry of Hertfordshire seem to have rarely been called out on service. The 'Hitchin Cavalry' (presumably the Northern Troop from nearby King's Walden) once went to Ware to deal with riotous behaviour by strikers, but little is known of the events.

All the Volunteer Cavalry were disbanded after the Treaty of Amiens, but the peace was short-lived, and on the resumption of war the Hertfordshire units were reformed in August 1803 with an additional Troop, giving the county the following Yeomanry and Volunteer Cavalry by 1805:

- Southern Troop, Major Sir Abraham Hume, 135 men
  - Horse Artillery, Capt John Cook
- Northern Troop, Capt Adolphus Meetkerke of Rushden, 70 men
- Eastern Troop, Capt John Calvert, 70 men
- Beechwood Troop, Capt Sir John Sebright, 70 men
- Sawbridgeworth Troop, Capt Michael Hankin
- Ashridge Troop, Lt-Gen the Earl of Bridgewater, 50 men
- Midland Troop, Capt the Hon Penistone Lamb, 120 men
- Western Troop, Capt the Hon G. Villiers, 80 men

On 20 August 1803 Sir Abraham Hume assumed command of the South Hertfordshire Legion, an all-arms 'battle group' consisting of the Southern Troop of Yeomanry Cavalry, the Horse Artillery Troop, and the Cheshunt and Wormley Volunteer Infantry, one of the infantry units that had been raised in the county. After the death of Capt Penistone Lamb in January 1805 he was succeeded in command by his brother the Hon William Lamb. Similarly, after the resignation of Capt George Villiers, his elder brother the Earl of Clarendon was promoted from Cornet to command in his place. As the threat of French invasion declined after the Battle of Trafalgar, funding for the Volunteer Cavalry was reduced from 1806, and interest and numbers declined. During the Great Fire of Stevenage, troopers from the Herts Yeomanry assisted the local volunteer firefighters. The Beechwood Troop was disbanded by July 1807, and the Ashridge and Sawbridgeworth Troops by early March 1809. The Yeomanry Troops continued in existence, but resisted being organised into a single regiment.

== 19th century ==
The Yeomanry declined in importance and strength after the end of the French wars, and by 1824 all the Hertfordshire Troops had been disbanded. However, a wave of civil unrest across Britain from 1830 led to a revival of the Yeomanry and new Troops were formed in Hertfordshire from December that year. First came two troops of Light Dragoons designated the South Herts Yeomanry Cavalry, shortly joined by a third troop at Hertford. Then came a number of independent troops across the county so that by March 1831 they totalled seven:

South Hertfordshire Yeomanry Cavalry (Light Dragoons)

  - Commanding Officer: Major James Gascoyne-Cecil, 2nd Marquess of Salisbury
  - 1st South Hertfordshire Troop of Yeomanry Cavalry, formed 6 December 1830 at Hoddesdon
  - 2nd South Hertfordshire Troop of Yeomanry Cavalry, formed 6 December 1830 at Hatfield
  - 3rd South Hertfordshire Troop of Yeomanry Cavalry, formed 18 December 1830 at Hertford, under Capt Baron Dimsdale, from 1833 Capt Viscount Fordwich
- Cashio Troop of Hertfordshire Yeomanry Cavalry (Heavy Dragoons), formed 23 December 1830 at Gorhambury House, near St Albans, under Capt Viscount Grimston (son and heir of the Lord Lieutenant, the Earl of Verulam)
- Northern Troop of Hertfordshire Yeomanry Cavalry formed 16 February 1831 at Baldock under Capt-Commandant Samuel H. Unwin Heathcote of Shephall
- Dacorum Troop of Hertfordshire Yeomanry Cavalry (Heavy Dragoons), formed 16 February 1831 at Beechwood under Capt Thomas Gage Saunders Sebright, disbanded March 1836
- Gilston Troop of Hertfordshire Yeomanry Cavalry, formed 9 March 1831 under Capt Henry George Ward, disbanded 12 November 1842

The Cashio Troop joined the South Herts as its fourth troop on 14 February 1832, when the Marquess of Salisbury was promoted to lieutenant-colonel and Viscount Grimston to major. In 1835 the Cashio Trp was called out to guard the courthouse at Ampthill in neighbouring Bedfordshire, and later in the year to guard Hatfield House against looters after a fire. Grimston (by then 2nd Earl of Verulam) took over the command in 1847, while the Marquess of Salisbury dropped back to major. By 1850 the troops were designated A, B, C and D (Cashio). The North Herts Troop remained independent as the North Hertfordshire Yeomanry Cavalry, and may have reached the strength of four troops required for an independent regiment, but had been reduced to one by 1850. Both regiments (except the Cashio Trp) were designated as Hussars. Arthur De Vere Capell, Viscount Malden, formerly of the Royal Horse Guards, who had been second-in-command, was promoted lt-col to command the South Herts regiment on 9 September 1864.

=== Cardwell Reforms ===
Under the Cardwell Reforms the two regiments were amalgamated as the Hertfordshire Yeomanry in August 1870, with regimental headquarters (RHQ) at Hertford (later at St Albans), and the North Herts as E Trp. The regiment was designated as Dragoons in 1874. Viscount Malden died in March 1879, and his second-in-command, Edward Villiers, 5th Earl of Clarendon, was promoted lt-col in command on 19 July 1879. A Troop relocated from the Hoddesdon–Cheshunt area to Aldenham in 1880, which spread the troops more evenly across the county. In 1886 the troop established a drill station (later troop headquarters) at Hendon, allowing the regiment to recruit in neighbouring Middlesex. E Troop, the old North Herts Yeomanry, was disbanded in 1887, reflecting the drift towards the south of the county and the North London suburbs.

Following the Cardwell Reforms a mobilisation scheme began to appear in the Army List from December 1875. This assigned Yeomanry units places in an order of battle of corps, divisions and brigades for the 'Active Army', even though these formations were entirely theoretical, with no staff or services assigned. The Hertfordshire Yeomanry were assigned as 'divisional troops' to 2nd Division of I Corps based at Chelmsford, alongside Regular Army units of infantry, artillery and engineers stationed in Eastern England. This was never more than a paper organisation, but from April 1893 the Army List showed the Yeomanry regiments grouped into brigades for collective training. They were commanded by the senior regimental commanding officer (CO) but they did have a Regular Army Brigade major. The Hertfordshire Yeomanry together with the Suffolk Yeomanry formed the 7th Yeomanry Brigade. The Yeomanry brigades disappeared from the Army List after the Second Boer War. The troops were grouped into pairs as squadrons on 1 April 1893.

== Imperial Yeomanry ==
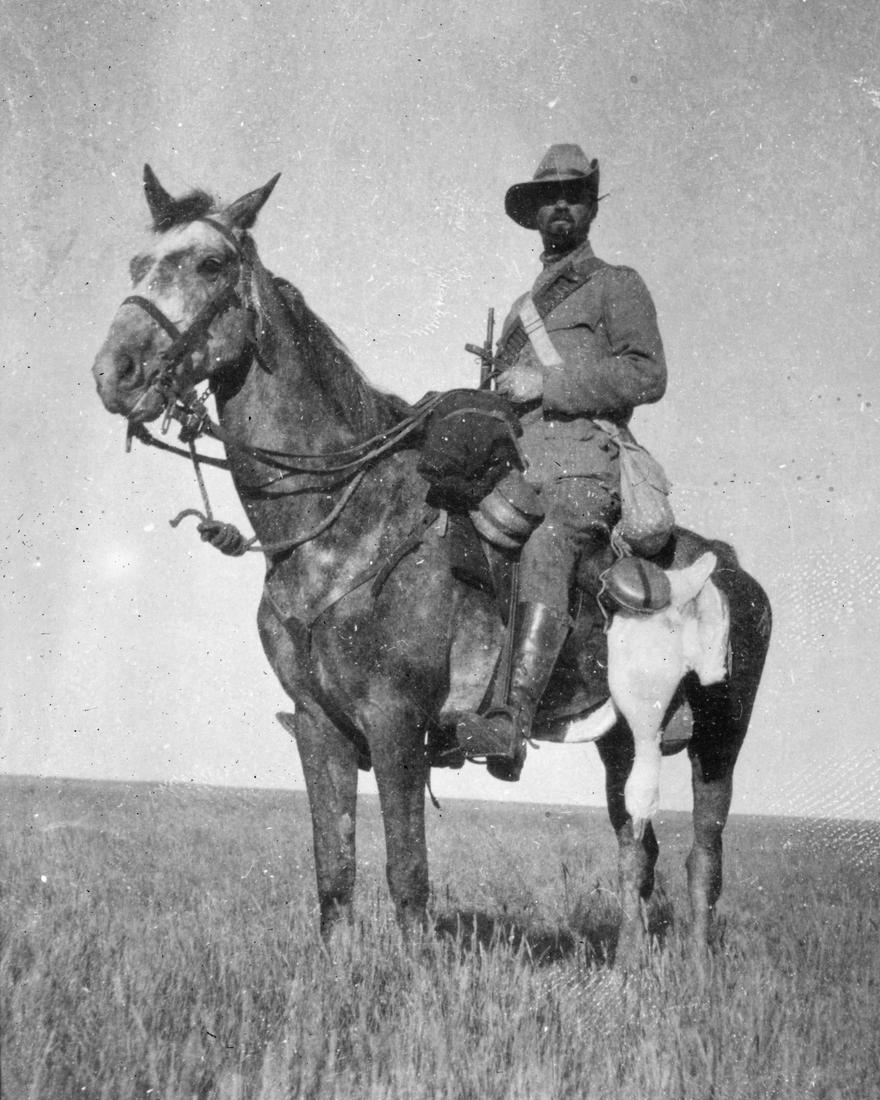
A typical Imperial Yeoman on campaign

Following a string of defeats during Black Week in early December 1899, the British government realised that it would need more troops than just the regular army to fight the Second Boer War. On 13 December, the decision to allow volunteer forces to serve in South Africa was made, and a Royal Warrant was issued on 24 December. This officially created the Imperial Yeomanry (IY). The force was organised as county service companies of approximately 115 men signed up for one year, and volunteers from the Yeomanry and civilians (usually middle and upper class) quickly filled the new force, which was equipped to operate as Mounted infantry. The Hertfordshire Yeomanry raised the 42nd (Hertfordshire) Company and a machine gun (MG) section, which landed in South Africa on 28 March.

From May 1900 the 12th Bn IY was serving as Corps Troops with Lord Roberts' main army north of the Orange River. It served on the Rhenoster River and in the Brandwater Basin operations. 42nd (Herts) Company then operated around Krugersdorp and Potchefstroom for the rest of its service, seeing a good deal of action. The First Contingent of the Imperial Yeomanry completed their year's term of service in 1901 and 42nd Company went home in May, having earned the Hertfordshire Yeomanry its first Battle honour: South Africa 1900–01. Among the civilian volunteers who joined the 42nd Company was Dr Arthur Martin-Leake from Hemel Hempstead District Hospital, who enlisted as a trooper. After his year's service Martin-Leake became a medical officer in the South African Constabulary and won the Victoria Cross (VC) for rescuing wounded under fire in February 1902. He won a Bar to his VC – one of only three ever awarded – for his conduct at the First Battle of Ypres in 1914.

The mounted infantry concept was considered a success and before the war ended the existing Yeomanry regiments at home (including the Hertfordshires) were converted into Imperial Yeomanry, with an establishment of RHQ and four squadrons with an MG section. On his return from South Africa (where he had served as second-in-command of 12th Bn IY), Maj the Earl of Essex (son of Viscount Malden, the former CO) was promoted to succeed Lt-Col the Earl of Clarendon as CO of the Hertfordshire Imperial Yeomanry.

== Territorial Force ==
The Imperial Yeomanry were subsumed into the new Territorial Force (TF) under the Haldane Reforms of 1908. The Hertfordshire Yeomanry, which also recruited from North London suburbs, were organised as follows:

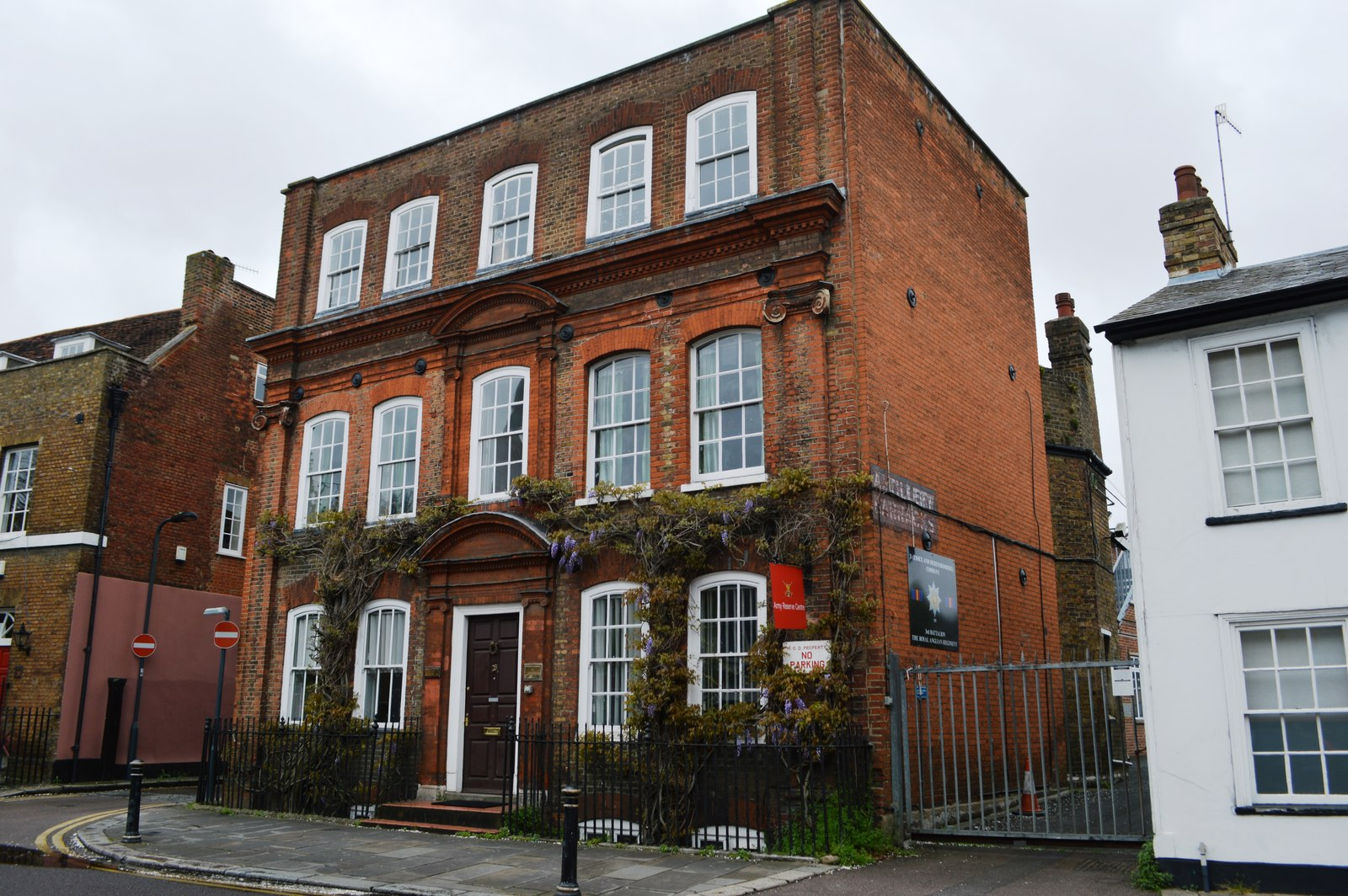
Yeomanry House, Hertford, RHQ of the Hertfordshire Yeomanry from 1910.

- RHQ at St Albans; moved into Yeomanry House, 28 St Andrew's Street, Hertford, in 1910
- A Squadron at 32 Market Street, Watford, with detachments at Berkhamsted and St John's Wood
- B Squadron at 24 Raynham Road, Hertford, then to Yeomanry House, with detachments at Broxbourne, Enfield Lock, Hoddesdon and Sawbridgeworth
- C Squadron at 23 Prospect Road, St Albans, moved to Ramsbury Road by 1914, with detachments at Hendon, Harpenden, Davies Street (Mayfair), Islington, Hemel Hempstead, Radlett and Redbourn
- D Squadron at 51 Salisbury Road, High Barnet, with detachments at Enfield, Finsbury Park, Harringay, Hitchin and Islington

The Hertfordshire Yeomanry was attached for training to the TF's Eastern Mounted Brigade. The Earl of Essex retired from the regimental command in 1913 and was succeeded by Lt-Col Abel Henry Smith.

== World War I ==
=== Mobilisation ===
The Hertfordshire Yeomanry completed its 1914 annual camp at the end of the first week in June. On the outbreak of World War I the embodiment of the TF was proclaimed on 4 August and the regiment mobilised at its squadron HQs next day. The men were billeted nearby until they had been equipped and the horses requisitioned, and then set off on the two-day march to their war station at Mountnessing, Essex, to link up with Eastern Mounted Brigade. The regiment was moved around Essex and Suffolk, finally reaching Culford, near Bury St Edmonds, on 21 August.

Under the Territorial and Reserve Forces Act 1907 (7 Edw. 7, c.9), the TF was intended as a home defence force and its members could not be compelled to serve outside the country. However, after the outbreak of war, TF units were invited to volunteer for Overseas Service. The Herts Yeomanry held squadron parades at Culford on 22 August where the officers and men were invited to volunteer, and more than 80 per cent of the regiment did so at once. On 31 August 1914, the War Office authorised the formation of Reserve or 2nd-Line units for each existing TF unit where 60 per cent or more of the men had volunteered. Initially these were formed from men who had not volunteered or were unfit for overseas service, and the recruits who were flooding in. The titles of these 2nd Line units would be the same as the original, but they were distinguished by '1/' and '2/' prefixes. In this way duplicate units were created, mirroring those being sent overseas. Later they were mobilised for active service in their own right and 3rd Line units were created to supply reinforcement drafts to the 1st and 2nd Lines.

=== 1/1st Hertfordshire Yeomanry ===
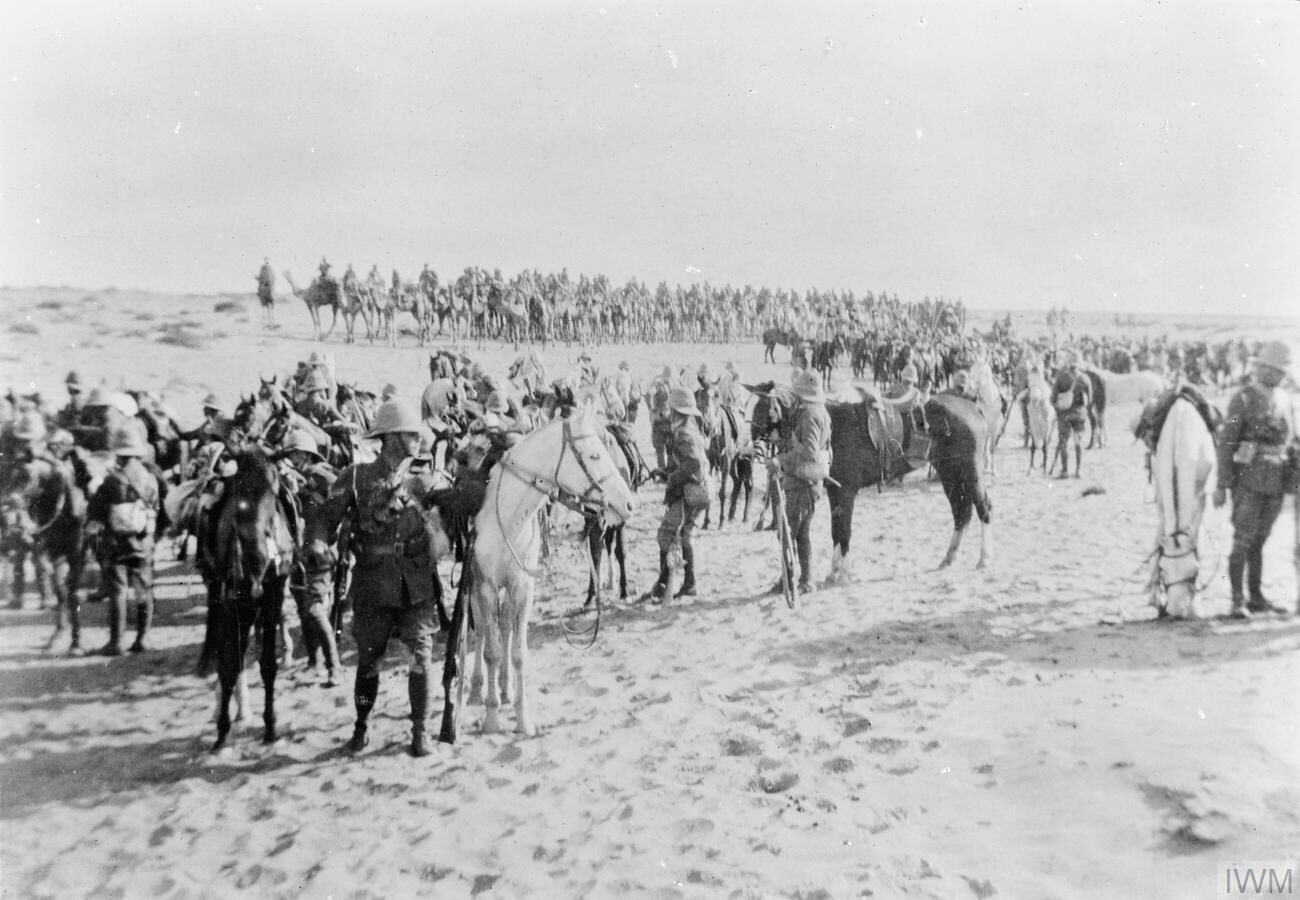
1/1st Herts Yeomanry and the Bikaner Camel Corps on a reconnaissance into the Sinai Desert, February 1915.

On 31 August the 1/1st Herts Yeomanry was warned for service in Egypt. The regiment's CO, Lt-Col Abel Smith, was not passed medically fit for overseas service, so Col T.E. Harrison, DSO, retired from the Leicestershire Yeomanry, was 'dug out' to take the 1/1st Herts Yeomanry overseas. Lieutenant-Col Abel Smith took command of the 2/1st Herts Yeomanry. The war establishment of a cavalry regiment overseas was three rather than four squadrons: C Sqn 1/1st Herts Yeomanry was broken up and the manpower distributed to the other three; its officer commanding, Maj Reginald Halsey, formed the regimental depot at RHQ, but had rejoined 1/1st Herts Yeomanry before it sailed.

In February 1915 1/1st Herts Yeomanry joined the Yeomanry Mounted Brigade formed to pursue to the Turks who had carried out a Raid on the Suez Canal: it gained the Battle Honours Suez Canal and Egypt 1915 without firing a shot. In August 1915 the brigade (now designated 5th Mounted Brigade) was sent to the Gallipoli Campaign as dismounted troops attached to the 2nd Mounted Division. The regiment was engaged in the disastrous Battle of Scimitar Hill and then served in the trenches until November. Casualties from Trench warfare and sickness were such that by September the 1/1st Herts Yeomanry and the Westminster Dragoons were temporarily combined as 5th Yeomanry Regiment in 1st Composite Mounted Brigade. After the evacuation of Gallipoli the regiment returned to Egypt in November 1915 and was remounted. It was able to raise two mounted squadrons in December for service with the Western Frontier Force for the Senussi Campaign.

In February 1916 the regiment was split up to provide divisional cavalry squadrons to the infantry divisions evacuated from Gallipoli:

- Regimental HQ with A Sqn and the MG Section were attached to 54th (East Anglian) Division and served with it at the First and Second Battles of Gaza. In August 1917 A Squadron joined XXI Corps Cavalry Regiment.
- B Squadron was attached to 11th (Northern) Division and accompanied it to the Western Front, where on 12 July 1916 it joined VI Corps Cavalry Regiment, until early in 1917 when it moved to join XVIII Corps Cavalry Regiment. In July 1917 the squadron returned to Egypt, where it served as the depot squadron in the Cavalry Wing of the Imperial School of Instruction at Zeitoun.
- D Squadron was attached to 13th (Western) Division and went with it to the Mesopotamian campaign. On 1 January 1917 it joined III (Tigris) Corps Cavalry Regiment for the Second Battle of Kut. It reverted to 13th (W) Division in March and was one of the first British units to enter Baghdad. The squadron later served with 15th Indian Division on the Euphrates and on the lines of communication for the North Persia Force until the end of the war. Before demobilisation, the squadron served as part of an internal security unit in Calcutta.

=== XXI Corps Cavalry ===
A Squadron 1/1st Herts Yeomanry joined XXI Corps Cavalry Regiment on 26 August 1917. The other two squadrons of the regiment were A Sqn 1/1st Duke of Lancaster's Own Yeomanry and C Sqn 1/1st Queen's Own Royal Glasgow Yeomanry (QORGY). In November the composite regiment formed part of the pursuing force after the Third Battle of Gaza. In May 1918 B Sqn 1/1st Herts Yeomanry at Zeitoun exchanged with C Sqn QORGY, and both Herts squadrons served together in XXI Corps Cavalry Regiment for the rest of the war. The regiment fought in the final Battle of Megiddo and then carried out an epic march up the coast of Ottoman Syria to liberate the ports. (Note: With two squadrons of the regiment present, the Hertfordshire Yeomanry was eligible for the battle honours awarded for the rest of the campaign: Palestine 1918, Megiddo, Sharon and Damascus, the latter covering the advance into Syria.)

=== 2/1st Hertfordshire Yeomanry ===
The 2nd Line regiment was formed under Lt-Col Abel Smith at Hertford on 1 September 1914 and quickly recruited up to the war establishment for a yeomanry regiment. The Hertfordshire Territorial Association was able rapidly to provide uniforms and reasonably modern equipment. It spent the winter of 1914–15 in billets at Hertford then took over the old militia barracks in the town with temporary stabling when the horses arrived. In mid-1915 the 3rd Line regiment took over the role of draft-finding for the 1/1st Herts Yeomanry overseas, and the remaining home service men were transferred to join a squadron to a Provisional Brigade. The 2/1st left Hertford in June 1915 for two months' training on Epsom Downs, and then went to the Thetford–Brandon area to join 69th (2nd East Anglian) Division in First Army of Central Force, responsible for the defence of Eastern England. At the end of October it moved into winter quarters in billets in Huntingdon. In February 1916 Lt-Col Abel Smith, who was no longer fit for active service, moved to the Regimental Depot; Maj J.B. Gilliat (who had commanded 42nd (Herts) Company, IY, in the Boer War) was promoted to take command. On 28 April 1916 the regiment joined the 16th (2/1st Southern) Mounted Brigade of the 4th Mounted Division in the Manningtree area. The division's role was to be a mobile reserve in case of invasion and was regularly on alert, such as during the Battle of Jutland.

In July 1916 4th Mounted Division was converted into a Bicycle infantry division, but 2/1st Herts Yeomanry was one of three of its regiments selected to remain mounted, and it was exchanged into 3rd Mounted Bde of 1st Mounted Division in General Reserve of Home Forces, with the regiment billeted at Westerham. Despite some false alerts of invasion or riot duty, and rumours that the division was to be sent overseas, the regiment remained in Kent. In the spring of 1917 it moved to Wildernesse, near Sevenoaks, and carried out mounted training in Knole Park. However, by mid-August 1917 the 1st Mounted Division was also converted to cyclists (as The Cyclist Division), and 2/1st Herts Yeomanry gave up its horses and converted to the four-company organisation of a cyclist battalion, except one mounted squadron that joined 6th Reserve Cavalry Regiment. The role of the Cyclist Division was to train and provide reinforcement drafts for cycle units serving overseas, but many of the remaining trained cavalrymen were transferred to the reserve cavalry regiments.

2/1st Hertfordshire Yeomanry remained in 3rd Mounted Bde (renamed 13th Cyclist Bde) but on 26 October it transferred under conditions of secrecy to 214th (Special) Bde in 71st Division. Popularly known as the 'Hush Brigade', this force was being assembled at Colchester for operations at Murmansk. The regiment moved into billets at West Bergholt and was brought up to establishment with men of 'A1' medical category: Lt-Col Gilliat reverted to the retired list and Lt-Col W. Byron of the Leicestershire Yeomanry assumed the command. The battalion was issued with steel helmets and trained for beach landings from naval destroyers, to wade ashore with their bicycles on their shoulders. 71st Division was broken up at the beginning of 1918 and on 12 February 214th Bde joined 67th Division, still at Colchester. The brigade retained its special mission, but this was cancelled in March after the German Spring Offensive was launched on the Western Front. The regiment immediately supplied large numbers of A1 men as infantry reinforcements for the Western Front, and continued to do so in its depleted state for the rest of the war, taking in men from disbanded units and recruits from training regiments and preparing them for active service. It was demobilised at Ipswich in January 1919.

=== 3/1st Hertfordshire Yeomanry ===
The 3rd Line regiment was formed at Hertford in December 1914 and received its formal designation in January 1915. At first in squadron strength, it was commanded by Maj E.J. Upton, transferred to the Herts Yeomanry from the Eastern Mounted Bde's Transport and Supply Column of the Army Service Corps. In April 1915 it absorbed all the training staff from 2/1st Herts Yeomanry and assumed its role of training reinforcements. In March it had been affiliated to the 13th Reserve Cavalry Regiment at Colchester, and from June it sent all its trained men to a separate squadron with this regiment, retaining only the training staff and incoming recruits at Hertford. In November the establishment of 3rd Line Yeomanry regiments was increased to match the 2nd Line, so 3/1st Herts Yeomanry reorganised with RHQ and two squadrons at Hertford and the 'Overseas' Squadron at Colchester. However, in April 1916 the 3rd Line Yeomanry regiments were ordered to join their affiliated reserve cavalry regiments, and 3/1st Herts Yeomanry joined 13th Reserve Rgt, which had just moved to Maresfield in Sussex. Here 3/1st Herts Yeomanry was assembled as a full regiment for the first time, under the command of Maj Barré A.H. Goldie, with a basic training squadron, a continuation training squadron, and the overseas squadron holding men waiting to be drafted.

However, with the exception of Palestine there was little requirement for cavalry during World War I, and the large cavalry training organisation was reduced in February 1917. 3/1st Hertfordshire Yeomanry was absorbed into the reorganised 6th Reserve Cavalry Regiment at Tidworth Camp, which was responsible for training reinforcements for dragoon regiments. The new unit supplied its first draft to 1/1st Herts Yeomanry in April 1917.

The Regimental Depot remained in existence at Hertford as an administrative centre, first under Capt Barré Goldie, then under Col Abel Smith, until April 1917, when the Yeomanry lancer and dragoon depots were concentrated at Canterbury.

== Interwar ==
Before the TF reformed on 7 February 1920 the War Office had decided that only a small number of mounted Yeomanry regiments would be required in future, and the remainder would have to be re-roled, mainly as artillery. (Note: The 14 senior Yeomanry regiments and 2 regiments of Scouts remained as horsed cavalry; of the remainder, 1 became a mounted signals unit, 8 became armoured car companies, and the remainder (27) transferred to the Royal Artillery.) The Hertfordshire Territorial Force Association decided to combine the Hertfordshire Yeomanry with the two Hertfordshire batteries of the former 4th East Anglian Brigade, Royal Field Artillery (RFA) to form a complete (4-battery) field artillery brigade in the county. Initially it was to be called the '3rd East Anglian Brigade, RFA', and two of the batteries would carry the title 'Hertfordshire Yeomanry', but after the TF had been reorganised as the Territorial Army (TA) in 1921, the final title settled upon was 86th (East Anglian) (Hertfordshire Yeomanry) Brigade, RFA, which retained links to both lineages. The men of all four batteries wore the Royal Artillery (RA) cap badge, with the Hertfordshire Yeomanry's hart badge on the shoulder strap together with the shoulder title 'Y-RFA' for Yeomanry RFA rather than 'T-RFA' worn by other Territorial RFA units. The two units' Honorary Colonels continued to serve jointly. The new brigade had the following organisation:

- Brigade HQ at Yeomanry House, Hertford
- 341 (Hertfordshire) Battery at Riding School, Harpenden Road, St Albans
- 342 (Hertfordshire) Battery at Hertford
- 343 (Hertfordshire) Battery at Clarendon Hall, Watford
- 344 (Hertfordshire) Battery (Howitzer) at Bearton Camp, Hitchin

The brigade was part of the TA's 54th (East Anglian) Division. The RFA was subsumed into the Royal Artillery (RA) in 1924 and the word 'Field' was inserted into the titles of its brigades and batteries. The four batteries were unofficially designated by their home towns in 1930, but it was not until August 1937 that these titles were made official:

- 341 (St Albans) Field Bty
- 342 (Hertford) Field Bty
- 343 (Watford) Field Bty
- 344 (Hitchin) Field Bty (How)

In 1938 the RA modernised its nomenclature and a lieutenant-colonel's command was designated a 'regiment' rather than a 'brigade'.

== World War II ==
=== Mobilisation ===
Following the Munich crisis in 1938, the TA was rapidly doubled in size, with most units forming duplicates of themselves. In fact the Hertfordshire Yeomanry eventually contributed to four separate regiments during World War II: (Note: In 1939 the Hertfordshire Territorial Association proposed that the two field regiments should drop the 'East Anglian' subtitle and became '86th (South Hertfordshire Yeomanry)' and '135th (North Hertfordshire Yeomanry)' reflecting the pre-1870 regiments, but the War Office rejected this.)

- 86th (East Anglian) (Hertfordshire Yeomanry) Field Regiment
  - RHQ at Hertford
  - 341 (St Albans) Field Bty
  - 342 (Hertford) Field Bty
- 135th Field Regiment – formed 22 July 1939
  - RHQ at Hitchin
  - 344 (Hitchin) Field Bty
  - 336 (Northamptonshire) Field Bty – transferred from 84th (East Anglian) Field Bde; this battery had originally formed part of 4th East Anglian Bde alongside the two Hertfordshire batteries (see above)
- 79th (Hertfordshire Yeomanry) Anti-Aircraft Regiment – formed 1 November 1938 by expansion of 343 (Watford) Field Bty
  - RHQ at Watford
  - 246 (1st Watford) AA Bty
  - 247 (2nd Watford) AA Bty
  - 248 (Welwyn) AA Bty
- 191st (Hertfordshire and Essex Yeomanry) Field Regiment, Royal Artillery – formed 21 December 1942 with cadres drawn from 86th (Hertfordshire Yeomanry) and 147th (Essex Yeomanry) Field Rgts while both regiments were serving with 42nd Armoured Division
  - 532 Field Bty – cadre from 413 Bty of 147th Fd Rgt
  - 533 Field Bty – cadre from 462 Bty of 86th Fd Rgt
  - 534 Field Bty – cadres from both regiments

=== 86th (East Anglian) (Hertfordshire Yeomanry) Field Regiment ===
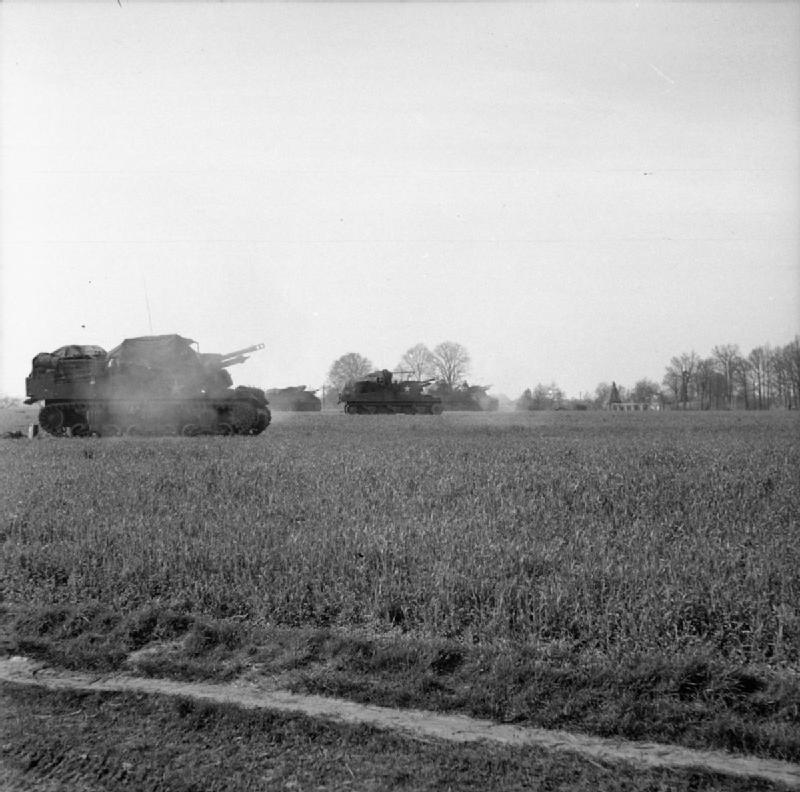
Sexton 25-pdr self-propelled guns of 86th Field Regiment firing against enemy positions in April 1945

The 86th (East Anglian) (Hertfordshire Yeomanry) Field Regiment, Royal Artillery was mobilised in September 1939. In 1940 the regiment was equipped with 8 x 4.5 inch Howitzers & 4 x 18/25-pounder guns. On 18 November 1940 it formed an additional 343 Bty, renumbered as 462 Bty 18 January 1941. It remained in the United Kingdom until 1944 being attached to various formations: 54th (East Anglian) Infantry Division from mobilisation until 9 June 1942, then 42nd Armoured Division until 3 May 1943, during which time it was converted to self-propelled guns, first with the Bishop and then the Priest. When 21st Army Group was formed in July 1943 to prepare for the Allied invasion of Normandy (Operation Overlord), 86th (HY) Fd Rgt was assigned to I Corps. When XXX Corps was brought back from Italy to spearhead the invasion, 86th (HY) Fd Rgt joined it, training with 50th (Northumbrian) Infantry Division in amphibious assault techniques for the Overlord landings including developing the technique of firing its Sexton SP guns from landing craft on the run-in to the beach. The regiment was among the first units to land on D-Day (6 June 1944). It later supported various formations of XXX Corps throughout the campaign in North West Europe, including in Normandy, the liberation of Antwerp, Operations Market Garden and Clipper, the Battle of the Bulge and the Reichswald battles (Operations Veritable and Blockbuster, the Rhine crossing (Operation Plunder) and the advance across Germany to Bremen.

=== 135th (East Anglian) (Hertfordshire Yeomanry) Field Regiment ===
135th Field Regiment was being formed on the outbreak of war and became independent of 86th Field Rgt on 7 September 1939. The regiment was part of 18th Division, the duplicate of 54th (East Anglian) Division. It served in the East Coast defences with extemporised equipment until 1941 when it was fully equipped, formed its third battery (numbered 499), and undertook mobile training preparatory to overseas service. 18th Division sailed on 31 October 1941 bound for Basra as reinforcements for Middle East Forces, but while it was at sea news arrived of the Japanese attacks on Pearl Harbor and Malaya. The convoy was diverted to India, but the troopship carrying 53rd Brigade and the personnel of 135th Field Rgt was sent straight to Singapore. Fighting with whatever guns were available until its own 25-pdrs arrived, 135th Field Rgt took part in the final stages of the disastrous Malayan campaign and the defence of Fortress Singapore. It was captured at the Fall of Singapore on 15 February. Although officers of the regiment wore Hertfordshire Yeomanry badges, formal authorisation for the regiment to adopt the '(East Anglian) (Hertfordshire Yeomanry)' subtitles was not issued until 17 February 1942, after it had gone into captivity.

As prisoners of war (PoWs) many of the men of 135th Field Rgt were forced to work on the Wan Po viaduct on the Burma Railway, which inspired the book and film The Bridge on the River Kwai. The regiment's commanding officer Lt-Col Philip Toosey was the senior Allied officer in the associated Prisoner-of-war camp, but unlike the fictional Colonel Nicholson did not collaborate with the Japanese.

=== 191st (Hertfordshire and Essex Yeomanry) Field Regiment ===
In 1942 both 86th (East Anglian) (Herts Yeomanry) and 147th (Essex Yeomanry) Field Regiments supplied cadres to help form 191st (Hertfordshire and Essex Yeomanry) Field Regiment, Royal Artillery. This regimenta also served through the campaign in North West Europe, supporting varied formations in the battles in Normandy, the liberation of Le Havre and the battles of the Scheldt under First Canadian Army. It was broken up in December 1944 to provide infantry reinforcements.

=== 79th (Hertfordshire Yeomanry) Heavy Anti-Aircraft Regiment ===
79th (Hertfordshire Yeomanry) Heavy Anti-Aircraft Regiment, Royal Artillery was formed in 1939 with headquarters at Watford.It served in the Battle of France, The Blitz, Operation Torch and the Italian Campaign before being placed in suspended animation in early 1945.

== Postwar ==
The regiment was reconstituted as 286 (Hertfordshire Yeomanry) Field Regiment (later Medium Regiment) in 1947 and absorbed 479 (Hertfordshire Yeomanry) Heavy Anti-Aircraft Regiment in 1955. The regiment amalgamated with the 305th (Bedfordshire Yeomanry) Light Regiment to form the 286th (Hertfordshire and Bedfordshire Yeomanry) Field Regiment in 1961. The unit was disbanded in 1967 but reformed as 201 (Hertfordshire and Bedfordshire Yeomanry) Battery, 100th (Yeomanry) Regiment Royal Artillery in 1971. Under Army 2020, this unit was placed in suspended animation in 2014.

== Heritage and ceremonial ==
=== Uniforms and insignia ===
At the time of the Royal Review in 1800, the five Yeomanry Troops wore blue coats with red cuffs and collars and buff waistcoats. They wore Tarleton helmets helmets with a feather. The Western and Centre Troops were distinguished by having lace on the chest of their coats. The Beechwood Troop of Volunteers had green coats with buff waistcoats, the Sawbridgeworth Troop blue jackets with red facings. These uniform colours were still in use in 1806.

The Hart (male deer) is frequently used as a punning badge by organisations in Hertfordshire (pronounced and occasionally written as 'Hartfordshire'). A Hart 'Trippant' was adopted by the Northern Troop as its badge at some point in the period 1794–1824 and was used by the regiment thereafter. In this case the hart is surrounded by a garter inscribed 'NORTH HARTS YEOMANRY' surmounted by a crown. From 1831 the South Herts and the Dacorum Trp wore the hart in the centre of a crowned Maltese cross as their Shako plate. On the 1852 pattern helmet the South Herts' badge was a hart trippant in a ford. The button adopted by the South Herts in 1831 had a crown within a garter inscribed 'HARTS YEOMANRY CAVALRY'; this design remained in use for all ranks until the formation of the Imperial Yeomanry (when the garter became a plain circle inscribed "HERTS IMPERIAL YEOMANRY'), but officers continued to wear the original design until 1919.

From their formation in 1831, A, B and C Trps of the South Herts wore light dragoon uniforms of a dark green long-tailed Coatee with a scarlet plastron front and black mohair lace, together with 'Oxford mixture' (dark blue-grey) trousers with a red stripe The headgear was a dark green (later black) shako. D (Cashio) Troop was dressed as heavy dragoons in a scarlet coatee with green facings and a white metal helmet with black plume. The light troops replaced the shako with a black lacquered helmet in 1852.

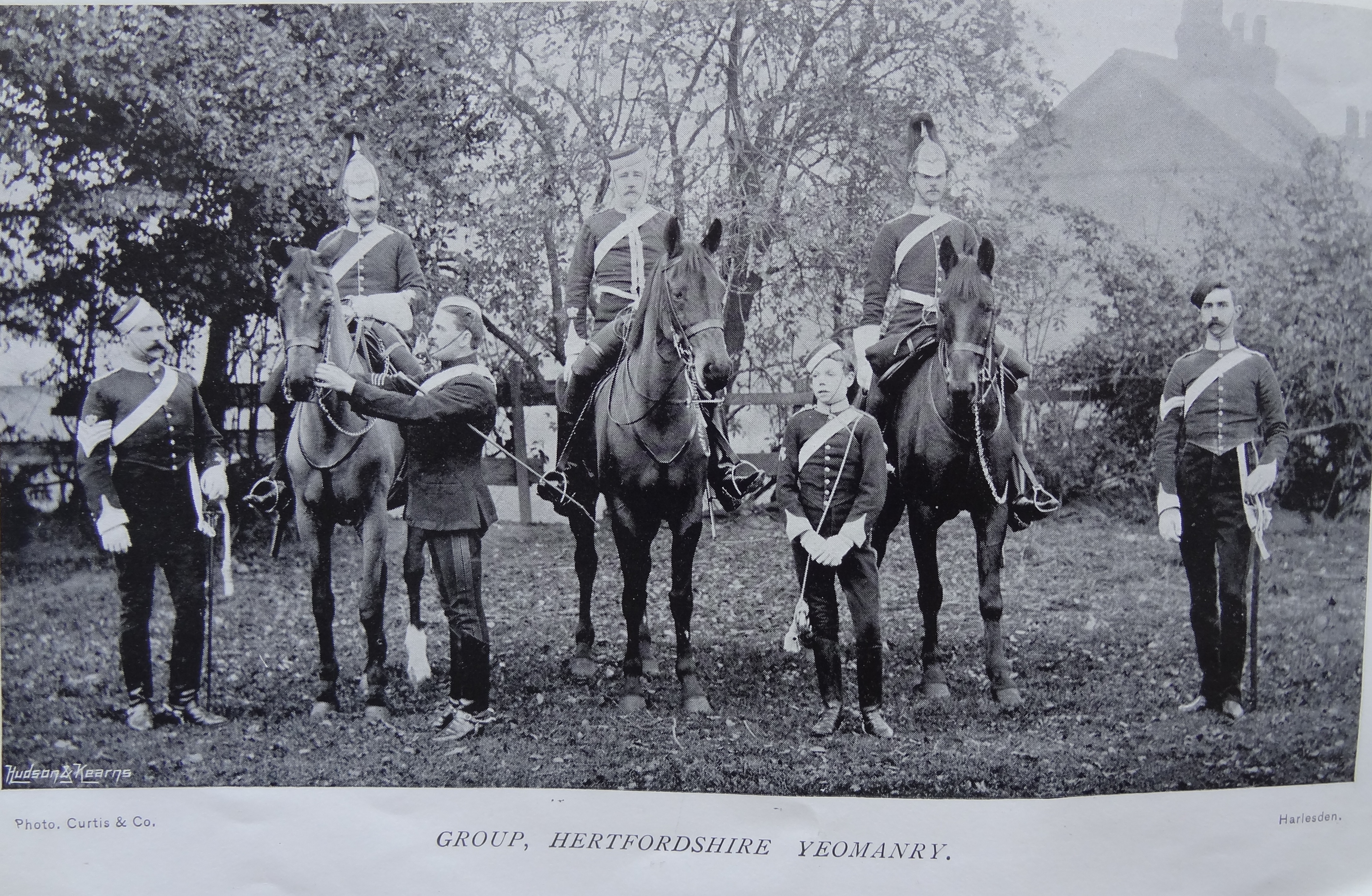
Hertfordshire Yeomanry in the 1890s.

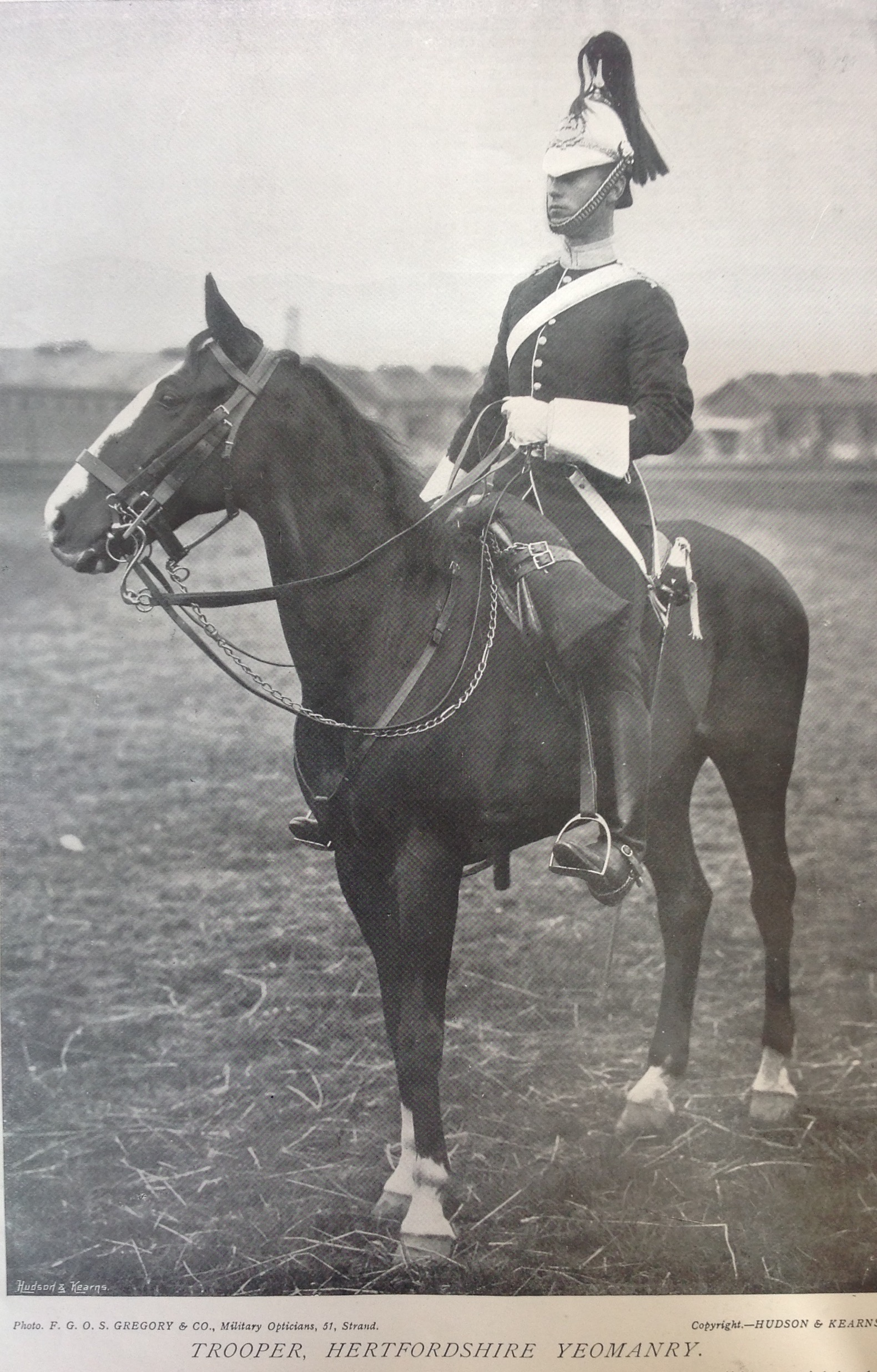
A mounted trooper of the Hertfordshire Yeomanry in 1896.

In the mid-1860s the distinction between the heavy and light troops of the regiment was abandoned, and all wore a new uniform with a single-breasted scarlet tunic and a white metal spiked Dragoon helmet bearing the hart badge. With the addition of a black horsehair plume for parade dress in 1880, this remained the uniform of the regiment into the early 20th Century. A pillbox cap was used for drill and undress wear. All the Yeomanry adopted blue riding pantaloons and 'butcher boots' in 1873 in place of the old booted overalls, which were retained for dismounted parades; the Hertfordshires wore red stripes on the pantaloons. Other ranks (ORs) wore a white shoulder-belt over the left shoulder; in marching order a white leather Bandolier was also worn, across the right shoulder. The cloak was blue, lined red. The horse furniture included a throat plume to match the helmet plume, and a black sheepskin saddle cover until 1896. Most Yeomanry regiments adopted white head-ropes in 1898, but the Hertfordshires retained the old steel collar chains.

Upon conversion to Imperial Yeomanry in 1906 the regiment adopted the standard khaki IY uniform with scarlet collars and cuffs; ORs wore a Slouch hat with the left side turned up and secured with the hart badge on a red rosette. Officers wore a khaki peaked cap, which was used by all ranks after 1906.Although officers might continue to purchase the full dress uniform, ORs had a 'substitute full dress' consisting of a scarlet 'frock' or jacket with pockets, worn with a pillbox cap until 1906 when a blue peaked cap with white piping was introduced. All ranks wore dark blue overalls with double red stripes. After 1908 the Hertfordshire Yeomanry wore the standard khaki service dress of the British Army, with regimental insignia, for nearly all occasions. This included leather bandoliers during the regiment's remaining years as a mounted unit. After 1938 khaki battledress was adopted.

When converted to artillery, the regiment had to adopt the Royal Artillery's 'gun' cap badge. However, all four batteries of the 86th Brigade also wore the Hertfordshire Yeomanry's hart badge, on the shoulder strap for officers, on the upper arm for ORs, later as collar badges and on the Field service cap worn in walking-out dress. The officers' blue patrol jacket retained cavalry-style shoulder chains. On 4 April 1943, as a unit of armoured artillery, the regiment unofficially adopted the black beret of the Royal Armoured Corps and wore the silver hart badge on it.

When the regiment was reformed in 1947 the hart collar badge was continued and all ranks wore shoulder-chains on blue patrol jackets. At the same time the pre-1900 'Harts Yeomanry Cavalry' button was reintroduced. 286 (Hertfordshire & Bedfordshire Yeomanry) Field Rgt wore the hart as a cap badge, with the Bedfordshire Yeomanry badge on the collar.

=== Standards and guidons ===
In 1795 at Theobald's Park, Lady Prescott presented her husband's Southern Troop of Yeomanry with a standard bearing the Coat of arms of Hertfordshire. The Marchioness of Salisbury presented a new guidon to the reformed South Herts after 1831. This is crimson with the Royal cypher 'WIVR' in intertwined letters in the centre of one side, with 'SOUTH HERTS' above and 'YEOMANRY' below; the reverse side probably bore the arms of Hertfordshire. However, on his death in 1839 Sir Abraham Hume left the old Southern Trp standard to the new Hoddesdon Trp with the wish that it should be carried once more, and this was done. Mrs Ward, wife of the commanding officer, presented the Gilston Trp with a pair of guidons similar to Marchioness's: the royal cypher on one side surrounded by the wording 'Gilston Troop of Herts Yeomanry' and on the other the county arms of the hart crossing a stream.

The regiment received an official guidon in 1909. This was red with a circle inscribed HERTS YEOMANRY' inside a union wreath of roses, thistles and shamrocks, with a crown above and the battle honour 'SOUTH AFRICA 1900–01' on a scroll beneath. After 1924 the battle honours (South Africa and nine from World War I) appeared in two columns of scrolls, but it was never paraded after the regiment converted to artillery.

=== Honorary Colonels ===
The following served as Honorary Colonel of the Hertfordshire Yeomanry: x

- Edward Hyde Villiers, 5th Earl of Clarendon, TD, appointed 7 February 1903, died 2 October 1914
- George Capell, 7th Earl of Essex, TD, appointed November 1914, died 25 September 1916
- Col Abel Henry Smith, TD, appointed 26 September 1916
- Col Abel Smith from the Herts Yeomanry and James Gascoyne-Cecil, 4th Marquess of Salisbury (himself a former Herts Yeomanry officer) from the 4th East Anglian Brigade, RFA, served as joint Hon Cols of 86th (East Anglian) (Hertfordshire Yeomanry) Brigade after the merger in 1921.
- Col B.A.H. Goldie, CBE, TD, appointed 21 February 1931

==== Other prominent members ====
- Algernon Capell, 8th Earl of Essex, was commissioned into the regiment as a 2nd Lieutenant under his courtesy title Viscount Malden on 10 December 1904 when his father was in command. He became a Lieutenant in the 7th Hussars and during World War I he served in the Remount Service as a Temporary Captain.
- Francis Fremantle, who had served as a civilian doctor with the field force in the Second Boer War, was commissioned into the Herts Yeomanry in 1902 and was promoted to Surgeon-Captain on 12 May 1906. During World War I He served as a senior Royal Army Medical Corps staff officer at Gallipoli and in Mesopotamia. Postwar he was elected MP for St Albans and was knighted.

=== Battle honours ===
The Hertfordshire Yeomanry was awarded the following Battle Honours:

- Second Boer War: South Africa 1900–01
- World War I: Suvla, Scimitar Hill, Gallipoli 1915, Suez Canal, Egypt, 1915–16, Megiddo, Sharon, Damascus, Palestine, 1918

The regiment claimed the World War I battle honours to which it was entitled, but as it had been converted to artillery the guidon on which they were emblazoned was never paraded. (The Royal Artillery does not carry battle honours: instead the guns are regarded as the colours, and the regiment bears the motto Ubique ('everywhere').)

=== Memorials ===
There are three stone tablets in the War Memorial Chapel of St Albans Cathedral commemorating the dead of the Hertfordshire Yeomanry:

- The first was erected by the regiment to the nine members of 42nd (Hertfordshire) Company, IY, who died on service during the Second Boer War.
- A second was unveiled on 31 July 1921 to the 64 men of the regiment who died in World War I.
- The third, to the men of all four Hertfordshire Yeomanry artillery regiments who died during World War II, was unveiled on 19 September 1954.
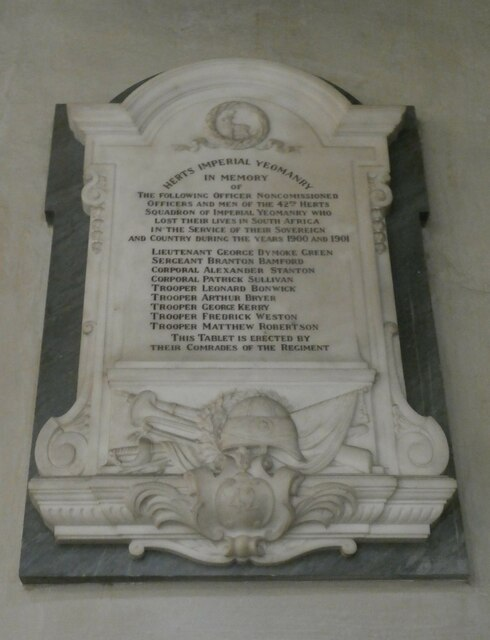
The Second Boer War memorial to 42nd (Herts) Company, IY.

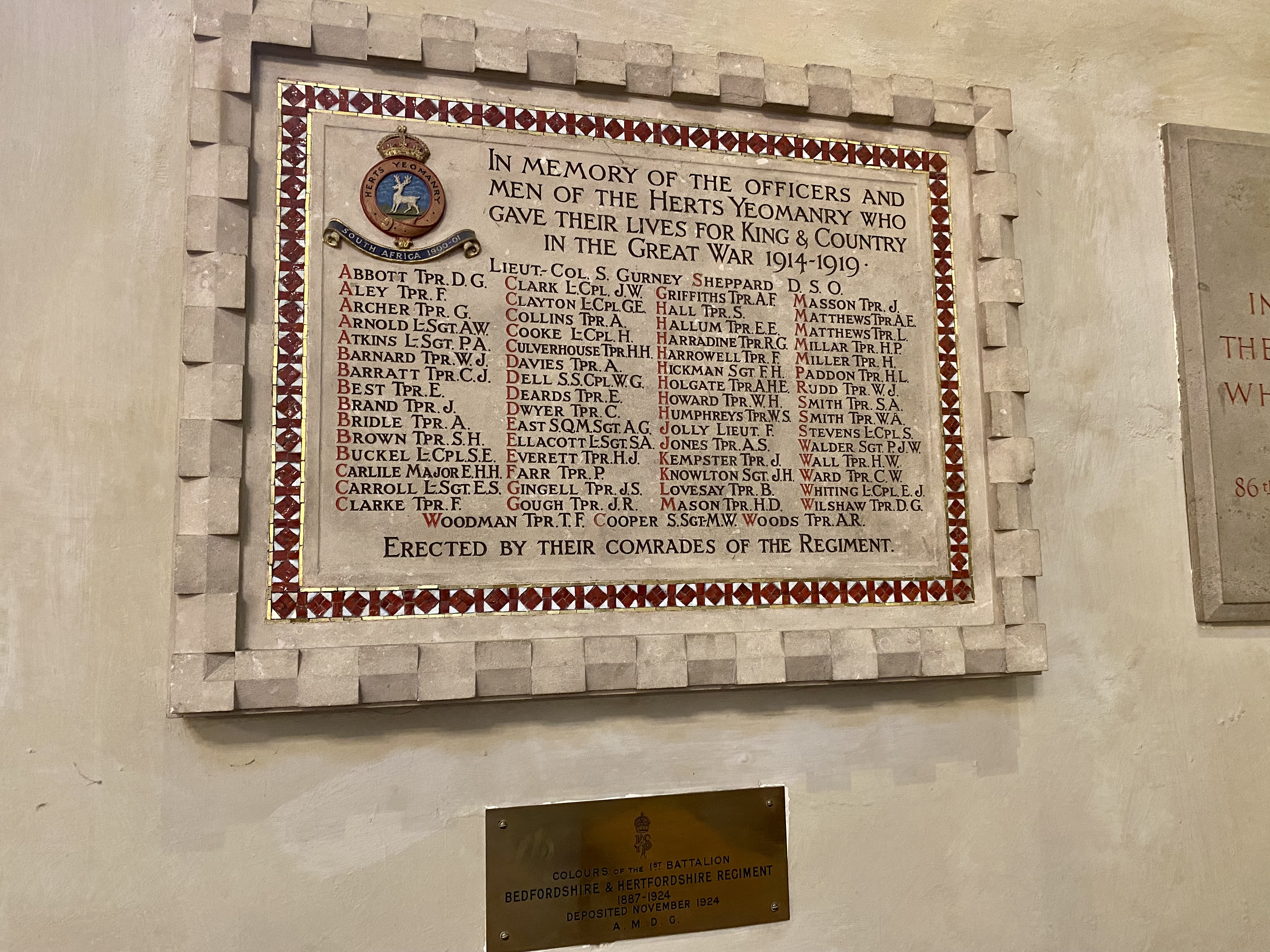
The World War I memorial to the Herts Yeomanry.

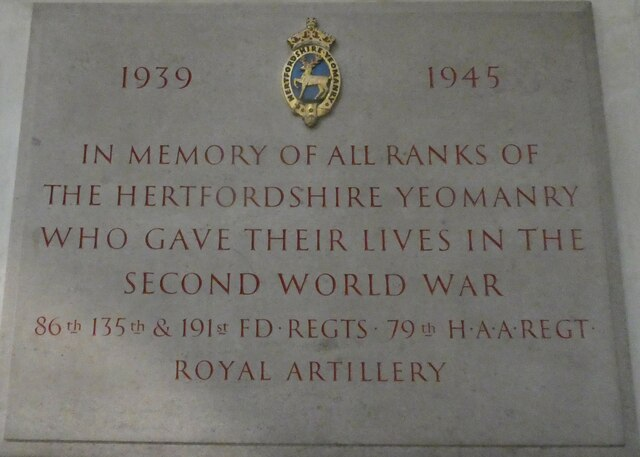
The World War II memorial to the Herts Yeomanry artillery regiments.

== See also ==
- Imperial Yeomanry
- List of Yeomanry Regiments 1908
- Yeomanry
- Yeomanry order of precedence
- British yeomanry during the First World War
- Second line yeomanry regiments of the British Army
- List of British Army Yeomanry Regiments converted to Royal Artillery
