= Algernon Capell, 8th Earl of Essex =

The Right Honourable The Earl of Essex

Personal details
- Born: Algernon George de Vere Capell; 21 February 1884
- Died: 8 December 1966 (aged 82)
- Spouse(s): Mary Eveline Stewart Freeman (m. 1905; div. 1925) Alys Montgomery Scott-Brown (m. 1926; div. 1950) Zara Mildred Carlson (m. 1950; div. 1957) Christine Mary Davis (m. 1957)
- Children: Reginald Capell, 9th Earl of Essex
- Parent(s): George Capell, 7th Earl of Essex; Elenor Harriet Maria Harford
- Education: Eton College

Algernon George de Vere Capell, 8th Earl of Essex (21 February 1884 – 8 December 1966) was a British aristocrat who succeeded to the title Earl of Essex in 1916 and became an amateur actor.

== Early life ==
He was the only child of George Capell, 7th Earl of Essex and, his first wife, Elenor Harriet Maria Harford (1860–1885). After his mother's death in 1885, his father remarried to an American heiress and socialite Adele Grant, daughter of the New York railway magnate David Beach Grant of the Grant Locomotive Works. From his father's second marriage, he had two younger half-sisters, Lady Iris Mary Athenais de Vere Capell, and Lady Joan Rachel de Vere Capell (wife of Osbert Peake, 1st Viscount Ingleby).

His paternal grandparents were Lt.-Col. Arthur de Vere Capell, Viscount Malden (son of Arthur Capell, 6th Earl of Essex), and Emma Martha Meux. His mother was the eldest daughter of William Henry Harford of Oldtown House in Almondsbury and the former Ellen Tower (third daughter of Rev. William Tower of How Hatch, Vicar of Braughing).

He was educated at Eton College.

== Career ==
He served in the 7th Hussars, gaining the rank of Lieutenant. He also served in the Hertfordshire Yeomanry and the Remount Service, temporarily gaining the rank of Temporary Captain.

Upon his father's death in 1916, he inherited the earldom of Essex. The death of his father brought the eventual demise of the Capell family seat, Cassiobury House. Death duties, a form of taxation introduced in 1894 by the Liberal Government, had placed an increasing financial burden on aristocracy and landed gentry, and was responsible for the breaking up of many large estates across Britain. His father's widow, Adele, was presented with a substantial tax bill and after six years, she decided to sell Cassiobury House and its contents. The house did not, however, find a buyer before Adele's death in July 1922. It remained unoccupied for a further five years before it was sold for materials and demolished in 1927. The site was acquired by property developers and today is the residential area of Cassiobury, with the remainder of the estate being used for Cassiobury Park.

=== Acting career ===
Lord Essex was an accomplished amateur actor and appeared in his own home, Bodenham Manor, Herefordshire with a troupe of Pierrots. He later organized a small troupe, called "The Canaries", to give charity performances. As the star of the show, the Earl sang comic and sentimental songs. Reportedly, the other members were a gardener's daughter, the village seamstress, a farm labourer, and two farmers.

== Personal life ==
Lord Essex was married four times. His first marriage, which was referred to as a "runaway marriage" was on 28 September 1905 to Mary Eveline Stewart Freeman (d. 30 Oct 1955), the eldest daughter of William Russell Stewart Freeman, of The Old Manor House in Wingrave (built by Hannah de Rothschild in 1876). Before their divorce in 1925, they were the parents of one son:

- Reginald George de Vere Capell, 9th Earl of Essex (1906–1981), who married twice, without issue.

His second marriage was on 10 February 1926 to Alys Montgomery (née Falkiner) Scott-Brown (d. 1977) at the Saint Albans registry office; she was the former wife of Ernest Scott-Brown and daughter of Robert Hayes Falkiner. Around 1930, Lord Essex had alterations made to Throope Manor, an 18th-century country house at Bishopstone, near Salisbury. The couple divorced in 1950.

Lord Essex married, thirdly, on 10 December 1950 to Zara Mildred Carlson of Los Angeles, California who was with the U.S. Consular Staff at Melbourne. They divorced in 1957.

His fourth, and final, marriage was to Christine Mary Davis (d. 1985) in 1957. She was a daughter of George Frederick Davis of Handsworth Wood.

Lord Essex died on 8 December 1966. Upon his death, his only son Reginald inherited the earldom. When his son died without issue in 1981, the title became dormant for eight years until it was revived by a distant cousin, Robert Capell.

Peerage of England
Preceded by George Capell	Earl of Essex; 1916–1966	Succeeded by Reginald Capell
