= William Jennings Capell =

Heir presumptive to the Earldom of Essex

William Jennings "Bill" Capell (born 9 August 1952), an American retired grocery clerk from Yuba City, California, is the heir presumptive to the Earldom of Essex. He will become the 12th earl if the current earl, Paul Capell, 11th Earl of Essex (currently 82 and unmarried), predeceases him without in-wedlock male issue.

== Claim ==
Capell had considered renouncing the earldom to maintain his United States citizenship (under the United Kingdom's Peerage Act 1963, a person may disclaim a hereditary peerage). U.S. law, however, requires renunciation of noble titles only of persons seeking to become naturalized citizens and of holders of government office (unless they have congressional authorization). As Capell is neither, there would be no legal impediment to his use of the title as a U.S. citizen; indeed, there is precedent in the case of the Earl of Wharncliffe, currently a Maine construction worker.

Like the sixth and later earls, Capell is descended from the younger son of the fourth Earl. His father, Bladen Horace Capell, claimed the title after the ninth earl died in 1981, but Robert de Vere Capell (1920–2005) eventually proved that his ancestor, Algernon, was older than Bladen's ancestor Adolphus and thus took his seat in the House of Lords in 1989.

== Personal life ==
Capell has two children:

- Jennifer Elaine Capell (b. 1974),
- Kevin Devereux Capell (b. 1982) married Dasia Capell (b. 1997)

Should Capell succeed to the earldom, his son would acquire the courtesy title Viscount Malden and his daughter Lady Jennifer Cabrera.

In 2005, Capell made his first visit to England with his wife, daughter, and son. The visit was televised on the tabloid show Inside Edition.

== Family tree ==
=== Recent relations ===
(Frances Hanbury Williams, d.1759)	William Anne Capell, 4th Earl	Harriet Bladen d.1821
George Capell, 5th Earl	The Hon. John Capel m. Lady Caroline Paget
Arthur Capell, 6th Earl m. Lady Caroline Beauclerk	The Hon. Algernon Capell m. Caroline Paget	The Hon. Adolphus Capell m. Charlotte Maynard
Arthur de Vere Capell, Viscount Malden m. Emma Meux	Charles Capell m. Alice Bellairs	Rev. Horatio Bladen Capell m. Ada Augusta Howkins
George de Vere Capell, 7th Earl m. Eleanor Hartford	Arthur de Vere Capell m. Alice Currie	Horace Capell m. Clara Jackson
Algernon de Vere Capell, 8th Earl m. Mary Stewart Freeman	Robert de Vere Capell, 10th Earl m. Doris Tomlinson	Bladen Ozro Capell m. Madge Crawford
Reginald de Vere Capell, 9th Earl	Paul de Vere Capell, 11th Earl	Bladen Horace Capell m. Mae Walley
William Jennings Capell
Kevin Capell
