= Adolphus Meetkerke =

English landowner and cricketer

Adolphus Meetkerke (22 December 1819 – 11 February 1879) was an English landowner and cricketer who played in one cricket match for Cambridge University that is recognised as having been first-class. He was born at Rushden, Hertfordshire and died at Southsea, Hampshire.

Meetkerke was descended from the Flemish Adolf van Meetkercke who settled in England in the late 16th century; the Meetkerke family took possession of the historic Julians manor house and lands at Rushden in north Hertfordshire in the 18th century, and he was the sixth of the line to bear his name. The family was connected to that of the novelist Anthony Trollope; the novelist's great-grandfather at one stage stood to inherit Julians, and a Meetkerke-owned farmhouse at Harrow, Middlesex was leased to the novelist's father. Adolphus Meetkerke was educated at Eton College and at Trinity College, Cambridge. His single game of first-class cricket was the 1840 University Match against Oxford University; in a low-scoring game, he batted as a lower-order batsman and made scores of 8 and 0.

Meetkerke inherited the Julians estate in 1840 and married in 1841; it is not clear if he took a degree at Cambridge University. He served in the Hertfordshire Militia and was also a Justice of the Peace for the county; as landowner at Rushden, he endowed the local school.
