= Leicester Devereux, 6th Viscount Hereford =

Leicester Devereux, 6th Viscount Hereford (1617 – 1 December 1676) was an English Peer. He was the second son of Walter Devereux, 5th Viscount Hereford (1578–1658).

He married Elizabeth Withipoll, daughter and sole heiress of Sir William Withipoll who inherited Christchurch Mansion, Ipswich. His second wife was Priscilla Catchpole. His daughter Frances married William Tracy, 4th Viscount Tracy (1657–1712). He was succeeded by his sons Leicester and Edward. His daughter Anne outlived her brothers and sister, becoming his heiress: she married Leicester Martin.

Peerage of England
Preceded by Walter Devereux	Viscount Hereford; 1658–1676	Succeeded by Leicester Devereux
Baronetage of England
Preceded by Walter Devereux	Baronet (of Castle Bromwich); 1658–1676	Succeeded by Leicester Devereux
