= Leicester Devereux, 7th Viscount Hereford =

Leicester Devereux, 7th Viscount Hereford (1674 – buried 12 February 1683) was an English child peer of the Norman-Welsh Devereux family.

Leicester was the eldest son and heir of Leicester Devereux, 6th Viscount Hereford (1617–1676) and his second wife, Priscilla Catchpole. succeeded to the title before he was 2 years old. He died at age 9 and was buried 12 February 1682/3. He was succeeded by his younger brother, Edward. Edward died at the age of 25 in 1700 and the viscountcy passed to a Welsh cousin Price Devereux of Vaynor Park, Montgomeryshire.

Edward's sister Anne outlived her brothers, becoming the heiress: she married Leicester Martin. Her daughter and heiress, Elizabeth, married distant cousin Price Devereux, 10th Viscount Hereford.

Peerage of England
Preceded by Leicester Devereux	Viscount Hereford; 1676–1683	Succeeded by Edward Devereux
Baronetage of England
Preceded by Leicester Devereux	Baronet (of Castle Bromwich); 1676–1683	Succeeded by Edward Devereux
