= Arthur Capell, 6th Earl of Essex =

English aristocrat (1803–1892)

The Right Honourable The Earl of Essex
- In office 1839–1892
- Preceded by: George Capel-Coningsby
- Succeeded by: George Capell

Personal details
- Born: Arthur Algernon Capel; 27 January 1803
- Died: 11 November 1892 (aged 89) Watford, Hertfordshire
- Spouse(s): Lady Caroline Beauclerk (m. 1825; died 1862) Lady Louisa Boyle (m. 1863; died 1876) Louisa Elizabeth Heneage (m. 1881)
- Children: 6
- Parent(s): Hon. John Thomas Capel; Lady Caroline Paget
- Relatives: William Capell, 4th Earl of Essex (grandfather)

Arthur Algernon Capell (27 January 1803 – 11 September 1892) was an English aristocrat who succeed to the title Earl of Essex in 1839.

== Early life ==
Arthur Algernon Capell was the son of Hon. John Thomas Capel and Lady Caroline Paget (eldest daughter of Henry Paget, 1st Earl of Uxbridge). He was the grandson of William Capell, 4th Earl of Essex from William's second marriage to Harriet Bladen. He was given the name of Arthur Algernon Capel at birth, but the spelling of the family name was legally changed by Royal Licence to Capell on 23 July 1880.

Arthur Algernon Capell's half-uncle, George Capel-Coningsby, 5th Earl of Essex, died in 1839 without any heirs, and the succession of the title passed to Arthur. Arthur's father, John Thomas Capel, was the half-brother of the 5th Earl and the nearest male sibling. John Thomas had died in 1819 and so the title passed to Arthur upon George's death on 23 April 1839. He also held the titles of 6th Viscount Malden and 7th Baron Capell of Hadham.

== Career ==
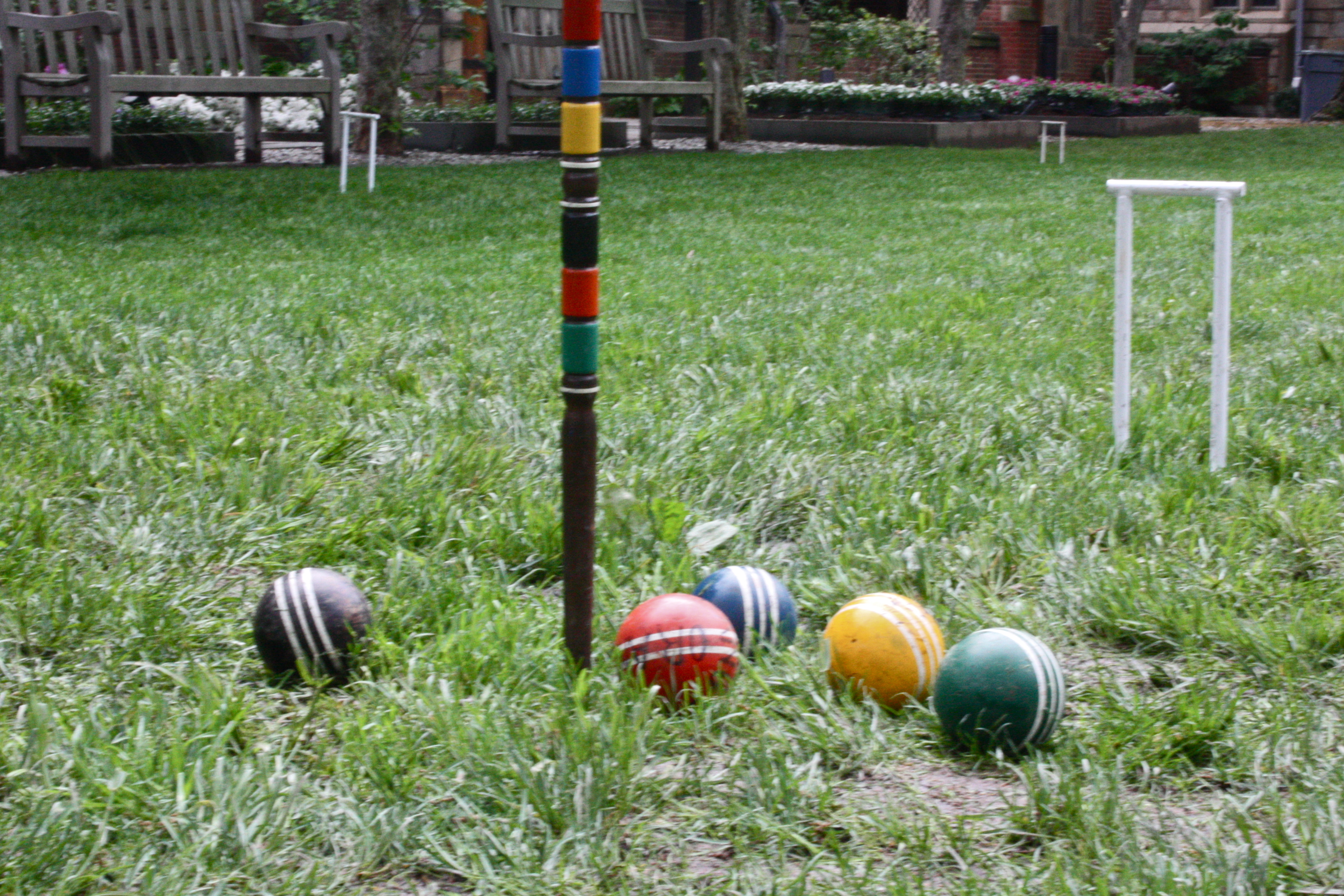
The game of Croquet, popularised by the 6th Earl of Essex

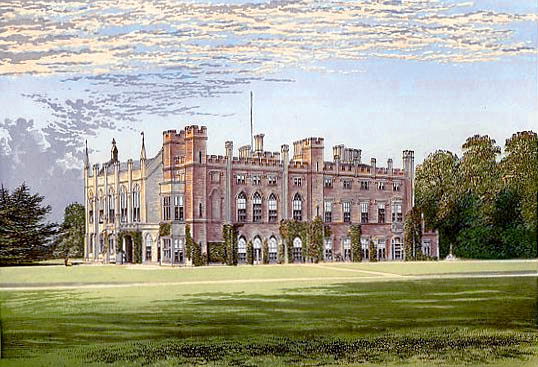
Cassiobury House (1888), as it appeared during the 6th Earl's life

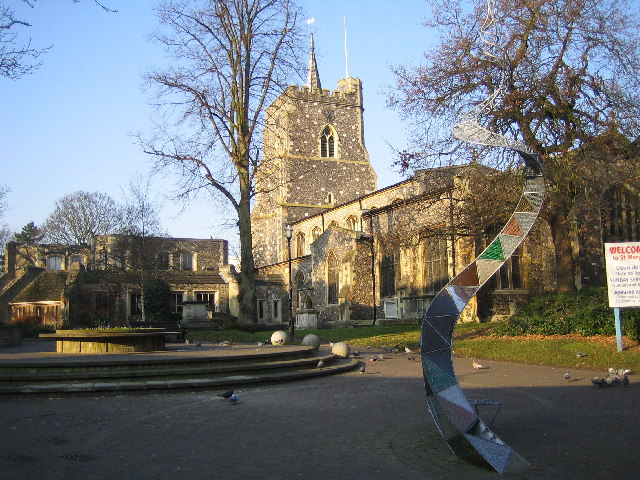
Capell is buried in the Essex Chapel at St Mary's Parish Church, Watford

The 6th Earl enjoyed a number of philanthropic and leisure pursuits and took a keen interest in a wide range of subjects. In the 1860s, he developed an enthusiasm for the new game of croquet. The gardens of Cassiobury House, the Capell family seat in Watford, Hertfordshire, was one of the first places in Britain in which croquet was played, and the Earl hosted lavish croquet parties there. A particular variant of the game was developed there, as detailed in Rules of the Eglinton Castle and Cassiobury Croquet, published in 1865 by Routledge, and the Earl even launched his own Cassiobury brand croquet set, made in his own sawmills in Watford.

Capell took an interest in the practice of homoeopathy which was growing in popularity at the time. He supported the activities of the British Homeopathic Association and served as a Vice President of the London Homeopathic Hospital.

Like many landowners of his time, the Earl also took an active interest in agriculture and developed a model farm, Home Farm, to the north of Cassiobury House. He was first president of the West Hertfordshire Agricultural Society, and in August 1864 he held first exhibition of the Watford and Leavesden Horticultural Society in the gardens at Cassiobury. He also held positions of Lay Rector of the Parish and president of the Watford and Bushey Volunteer Fire Brigade. The Earl also opened up the grounds of Cassiobury to the local residents of Watford, allowing the public free access to the park, on the condition that they did not hold picnics there (opening grounds to the public was now a common practice among landowners, such as at the parks of Arundel Castle, Hatfield House, Blenheim Palace and Alnwick Castle, all of continue to offer free access to local residents today). The park played host to cricket matches and parades of the Hertfordshire Yeomanry.

The prime minister of the day, Sir Robert Peel, offered to the Earl the position of Lord Lieutenant of Ireland, an appointment he declined due to ill health.

The 6th Earl was also an amateur painter, and a watercolour by Capell depicting the grand staircase at Cassiobury House now hangs in the Watford Museum.

== Personal life ==
Capell married three times. His first marriage was on 14 July 1825 to Lady Caroline Janetta Beauclerk, daughter of William Beauclerk, 8th Duke of St Albans and Maria Janetta Nelthorpe. Before her death on 22 August 1862, they were the parents of:

- Hon. Arthur de Vere Capell, Viscount Malden (1826–1879), who married Emma Martha Meux, third daughter of Sir Henry Meux, 1st Baronet, in 1853.
- Lady Adela Caroline Harriet Capell (1828–1860), who married, as his second wife, Archibald Montgomerie, 13th Earl of Eglinton, in 1858.
- Hon. Reginald Algernon Capel (1830–1906), who married Mary Eliza Fazakerley, daughter of John Nicholas Fazakerley of Burwood Park, in 1858.
- Hon. Randolph Alfred Capell (1831–1857), a Lieutenant in the Royal Navy who died at Rio de Janeiro, Brazil.

After her death, he married Lady Louisa Caroline Elizabeth Boyle on 3 June 1863. Lady, the eldest daughter of Charles Boyle, Viscount Dungarvan and Lady Catherine St. Lawrence (eldest daughter of William St Lawrence, 2nd Earl of Howth), was the sister of Richard Boyle, 9th Earl of Cork. Her father was the eldest son and heir apparent of Edmund Boyle, 8th Earl of Cork. Before her death on 5 May 1876, they were the parents of two children:

- Hon. Arthur Algernon Capell (1864–1940), who married Isabel Anne Wilson, a daughter of Col. Townshend Wilson, in 1890.
- Lady Beatrice Mary Capell (1870–1954), who married Edmund Banbury, a son of Frederick Banbury of Shirley House and brother to Frederick Banbury, 1st Baron Banbury of Southam, in 1913.

His third marriage was on 25 April 1881 to Louisa Elizabeth (née Heneage) Paget, widow of Lord George Paget and daughter of Charles Fieschi Heneage and Hon. Louisa Elizabeth Graves (daughter of Thomas Graves, 2nd Baron Graves). They had no children and Louisa outlived Capell by 22 years.

Arthur Algernon Capell died on 11 September 1892 at age 89. His eldest son, Arthur de Vere Capell, Viscount Malden, had died in 1879 aged 52 and so the Earl of Essex title passed to Arthur Algernon's grandson, George Capell.

He held almost 15,000 in England and Ireland

=== Legacy ===
Photographic portraits of the 6th Earl are held in the collection of the National Portrait Gallery, London and the Library of Congress in the United States.

Peerage of England
Preceded by George Capel-Coningsby	Earl of Essex; 1839–1892	Succeeded by George Capell
