= George Capell, 7th Earl of Essex =

British aristocrat

The Right Honourable The Earl of Essex DL JP

Personal details
- Born: George Devereux de Vere Capell; 24 October 1857 London, England
- Died: 25 September 1916 (aged 58) Newmarket, Suffolk
- Cause of death: Road accident
- Spouse: Ellenor Harriet Maria Hartford (m. 1882; died 1885) Adele Grant (m. 1893)
- Children: 3
- Parent(s): Arthur Capell, Viscount Malden; Emma Martha Meux
- Relatives: Arthur Capell, 6th Earl of Essex (grandfather)

Military service
- Branch/service: Grenadier Guards; Hertfordshire Yeomanry
- Battles/wars: Second Boer War

George Devereux de Vere Capell, 7th Earl of Essex (24 October 1857 – 25 September 1916), was a British aristocrat. He succeeded to the title Earl of Essex in 1892.

== Early life and background ==
Capell was born on 24 October 1857 in London, the son of Lt.-Col. Arthur de Vere Capell, Viscount Malden, and Emma Martha Meux. Upon the death of his grandfather, Arthur Capell, 6th Earl of Essex, on 11 September 1892, George Capell succeeded to the titles of 7th Viscount Malden, 7th Earl of Essex and 8th Baron Capell of Hadham.

== Career ==
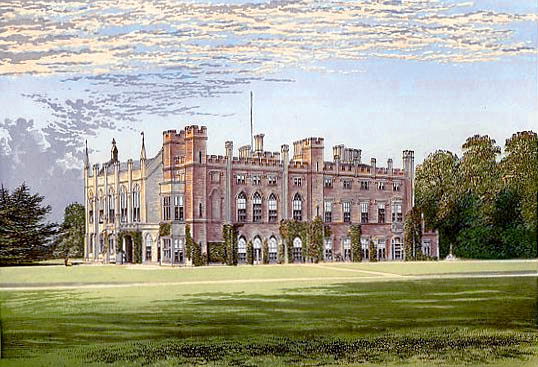
Cassiobury House as it appeared during the 7th Earl's tenure

Lord Essex held a number of military posts, including the rank of officer in the Grenadier Guards, Aide-de-Camp to HM King Edward VII, and Colonel in the Territorial Forces. He was appointed a major in the Hertfordshire Yeomanry on 23 November 1893. Following the outbreak of the Second Boer War in South Africa in late 1899, he volunteered for active service and was seconded to the Imperial Yeomanry, where, on 14 February 1900, he was appointed Second in Command of the 12th Battalion. He left Southampton in the SS Mexican in February 1900, and arrived in Cape Town the following month, serving in South Africa until 1901. On 19 December 1908, Capell was appointed a deputy lieutenant of Hertfordshire. He later held the offices of Vice-Lord-Lieutenant and Justice of the Peace for Hertfordshire.

Lord Essex's predecessors had invested considerably in rebuilding and decorating the family seat, Cassiobury House at Watford, to a luxurious standard. Both the 6th Earl and his uncle, George Capel-Coningsby, 5th Earl of Essex, were enthusiastic patrons of the arts and had built up a large fine art collection at Cassiobury. After the death of the 6th Earl, it became apparent that the Capell family fortunes had diminished, and as the new Earl, George Capell was faced with some financial difficulty.

In 1893, Christie's held an auction of some of the valuable paintings, books, porcelain and furniture from the Earl of Essex's collection at Cassiobury. George's second marriage to the daughter of a wealthy American industrialist the following year also helped to offset financial problems, and it was Adele's money that supported the estate in the early years of the 20th century and allowed the Earl to continue to host lavish parties. Cassiobury House enjoyed a high society profile at this time; in 1902 the Earl and Countess of Essex received the young Winston Churchill and King Edward VII at Cassiobury. In 1910, the house was presented in a flattering feature in Country Life magazine.

Nevertheless, the upkeep of Cassiobury was becoming increasingly expensive and in 1909 the family were forced to raise additional funds through the sale of 184 acres (0.74 km^{2}) of parkland to Watford Borough Council for housing. Cassiobury was let furnished while the family moved back to London.

== Personal life ==
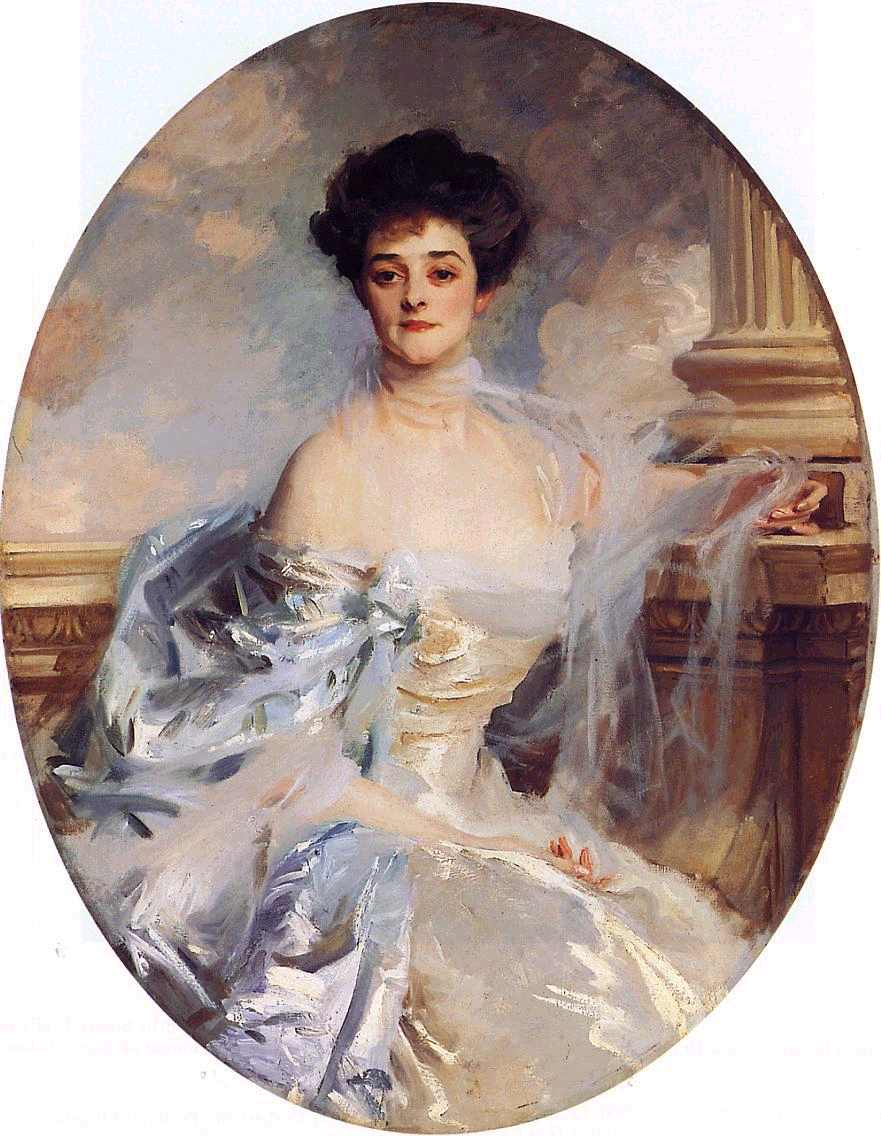
Portrait of his second wife, by John Singer Sargent, 1906.

Lord Essex married twice. His first wife, Ellenor Harriet Maria Harford, whom he married in 1882, died only three years later in 1885. Ellenor was the eldest daughter of William Henry Harford of Oldtown House in Almondsbury. Their only child, Algernon, was born in 1884.

In 1893, Lord Essex married again, this time to the American heiress and socialite Adele Grant, daughter of the New York railway magnate David Beach Grant of the Grant Locomotive Works. The wedding at St Margaret's, Westminster, on 14 December 1893, was noted in The New York Times as a grand social event, presided over by Archdeacon Farrar, and accompanied by Sir Arthur Sullivan on the organ. Together, the couple had two daughters:

- Lady Iris Mary Athenais de Vere Capell (1895–1977)
- Lady Joan Rachel de Vere Capell (1899–1979), who married The 1st Viscount Ingleby.

Lord Essex was run over by a taxi in September 1916. He died, aged 58, on 25 September at Stanley House in Newmarket, Suffolk. His titles passed to his son from his first marriage, Algernon Capell.

His death set in motion events that were to bring about the demise of Cassiobury House and change the town of Watford. Death duties, a form of taxation introduced in 1894 by the Liberal Government, had placed an increasing financial burden on aristocracy and landed gentry, and was responsible for the breaking up of many large estates across Britain.

Lord Essex's widow, Adele, was presented with a substantial tax bill. After six years, she decided to sell Cassiobury House, and a large sale of the contents was held over a period of ten days in June 1922 "by direction of the Right Honourable Adèle, Countess Dowager of Essex". The fine art collection was split up and sold to private collectors and museums around the world, and a number of significant works of art and interior fittings are now on display in the Metropolitan Museum of Art in New York, United States. Adele did not, however, find a buyer for Cassiobury House; in July 1922 she died of a heart attack in her bath, and the house remained unoccupied for a further five years. Finally, it was sold for its materials and demolished in 1927. The former site of the house was acquired by property developers for suburban housing — now the residential area of Cassiobury — and the remainder of the estate was acquired by Watford Borough Council and is now in use as Cassiobury Park.

Peerage of England
Preceded by Arthur Capell	Earl of Essex; 1892–1916	Succeeded by Algernon Capell
