= Geoffrey de Saye II =

English nobleman (1155–1230)

- Coat of arms of Geoffrey de Saye II's family

Personal details
- Born: c. 1155
- Died: 1230

Geoffrey de Saye II (c. 1155 – 24 August 1230) was the Lord of West Greenwich and a Magna Carta surety. He owned land at Edmonton and Sawbridgeworth. His family bore the arms Quarterly, or and gules.

Geoffrey de Saye II was born in 1155 in West Greenwich, Kent, England, the son of Geoffrey de Saye, Lord of West Greenwich (1135–1214). He married Hawise de Clare. He died on 24 August 1230 in Gascoigne, Poitou, France.
