= Reginald Capell, 9th Earl of Essex =

British Peer

The Right Honourable The Earl of Essex T.D.

Personal details
- Born: Reginald George de Vere Capell; 9 October 1906
- Died: 18 May 1981 (aged 74)
- Spouses: Mary Reeve Ward (m. 1937; div. 1957) Nona Isabel Miller (m. 1957)
- Parent(s): Algernon Capell, 8th Earl of Essex; Mary Eveline Stewart Freeman
- Education: St Cyprian's School; Eton College
- Alma mater: Magdalene College, Cambridge

Reginald George de Vere Capell, 9th Earl of Essex T.D. (9 October 1906 – 18 May 1981) was a British peer.

== Early life ==
He was the son of Algernon George de Vere Capell, 8th Earl of Essex, and Mary Eveline Stewart Freeman. He had the courtesy title Viscount Malden and was known as Reggie Malden.

He was educated at St Cyprian's School in Eastbourne, Eton, and Magdalene College, Cambridge.

== Career ==
He served in the army during World War II and was awarded the T.D. After the war, he began farming in Buckinghamshire. He retained his military connections and became Lieutenant-Colonel in 1947 and was commanding officer of the 16th Airborne Division Signals Regiment (Middlesex Yeomanry) (Territorial Army) in 1948. He became Honorary Colonel of the 16th (later 40th) Signal Regiment in 1957 and its successor, the 47th (Middlesex Yeomanry) Signal Regiment, in 1962.

=== House of Lords ===
Capell inherited the Earldom of Essex after his father died in 1966 and took his seat in the House of Lords. In his maiden speech in 1971, he opposed the recommendation of the Roskill Commission for the siting of a third London airport at Cublington. The third airport was eventually provided by the development of Stansted Airport.

== Personal life ==
Capell married, firstly, Mary Reeve Ward, daughter of F. Gibson Ward, on 2 March 1937. They were divorced in 1957. His second wife was Nona Isabel Miller (1906–1997), daughter of David Wilson Miller and widow of Francis Sydney Smythe of Yew tree cottage, Sussex, in November 1957. He had no children by either marriage. In 1967, Debrett's had identified Bladen Horace Capell, "a grocery clerk in Yuba City, California" eligible to become the Earl of Essex, if no other heirs could be identified.

On his death in 1981, the title became dormant, but it was revived eight years later by a distant cousin, Robert Capell.

Peerage of the United Kingdom
Preceded by Algernon Capell	Earl of Essex; 1966–1981	Succeeded by Robert Capell
