= Robert Capell, 10th Earl of Essex =

English noble (1920–2005)

Robert Capell
- Earl of Essex
- Tenure: 1981–2005
- Predecessor: Reginald Capell, 9th Earl of Essex
- Successor: Paul Capell, 11th Earl of Essex
- Born: Robert Edward de Vere Capell; 13 January 1920
- Died: 5 June 2005
- Noble family: Capell
- Spouse: Doris Margaret Tomlinson (m. 1942)
- Issue: Frederick Paul de Vere Capell
- Father: Arthur de Vere Capell
- Mother: Alice Currie

Robert Edward de Vere Capell, 10th Earl of Essex (13 January 1920 – 5 June 2005) was Earl of Essex from 1981, but was only recognized as such in 1989. He was then a member of the House of Lords until the slimming down of the house in 1999.

== Early life ==
Robert Capell was born in 1920, the son of Arthur de Vere Capell and his wife Alice Currie.

== Peerage ==
His father died when he was three, and he spent some time in an orphanage, where he was bewildered when the head told him he would be the Earl of Essex one day. Many years later, he received a newspaper clipping from a friend saying that the heir to the Earls of Essex might be an American, Bladen Horace Capell. This led Capell to correspond with distant and formerly unknown relations. Eventually, he was able to prove that his great-grandfather Algernon Capell had been the elder brother of Bladen Capell's great-great-grandfather, Adolphus Capell.

When the 9th Earl died in 1981, Robert Capell was a grocer in Lancashire. It took him eight years to prove his right to take his seat in the House of Lords, which he did in 1989. However, this right came to an end with the reforms of the House of Lords Act 1999.

Essex is not recorded in Hansard as having ever spoken in parliament.

== Personal life ==
In 1942, Capell married Doris Margaret Tomlinson, a daughter of George Frederick Tomlinson. They had one child:

- Frederick Paul de Vere Capell (born 1944), later the 11th Earl of Essex.

He died in 2005 and was succeeded as Earl of Essex by his son Paul Capell, described by The Daily Telegraph as an "ever so humble" schoolteacher.

Peerage of the United Kingdom
Preceded by Reginald Capell	Earl of Essex; 1981–2005	Succeeded by Paul Capell
