= Bertha of Hereford =

12th-century Anglo-Norman noblewoman

- 'Lady of Brecknock; Lady of Abergavenny; Lady of Hay; Lady of Bramber'
- Born: c. 1130; England
- Died: unknown
- Noble family: de Pitres
- Spouse: William de Braose, 3rd Lord of Bramber
- Issue: William de Braose, 4th Lord of Bramber; Roger de Braose; Bertha de Braose; Sibyl de Braose; Maud de Braose
- Father: Miles de Gloucester, 1st Earl of Hereford
- Mother: Sibyl de Neufmarché

Bertha of Hereford, also known as Bertha de Pitres (born c. 1130), was the daughter of Miles de Gloucester, 1st Earl of Hereford, and a wealthy heiress, Sibyl de Neufmarché. She was the wife of William de Braose, 3rd Lord of Bramber to whom she brought many castles and Lordships, such as Brecknock (including Hay Castle), and Abergavenny.

== Family ==
Bertha was born in England about 1130. She was a daughter of Miles, Earl of Hereford (1097- 24 December 1143) and Sibyl de Neufmarche. She had two sisters, Margaret of Hereford, who married Humphrey II de Bohun, by whom she had issue, and Lucy of Hereford, who married Herbert FitzHerbert of Winchester, by whom she had issue. Her brothers included Roger Fitzmiles, 2nd Earl of Hereford, Walter de Hereford, Henry Fitzmiles, William de Hereford, and Mahel de Hereford.

Bertha's paternal grandparents were Walter FitzRoger de Pitres, Sheriff of Gloucester and Bertha de Balun of Bateden, a descendant of Hamelin de Balun. Her maternal grandparents were Bernard de Neufmarché, Lord of Brecon, and Nesta ferch Osbern. The latter was a daughter of Osbern FitzRichard of Richard's Castle, and Nesta ferch Gruffydd. Bertha was a direct descendant, in the maternal line, of Gruffydd ap Llywelyn (1007- 5 August 1063) and Edith (Aldgyth), daughter of Elfgar, Earl of Mercia.

Bertha's father Miles served as Constable to King Stephen of England. He later served in the same capacity to Empress Matilda after he had transferred his allegiance. In 1141, she made him Earl of Hereford in gratitude for his loyalty. On 24 December 1143, he was killed while on a hunting expedition in the Forest of Dean.

== Marriage and issue ==
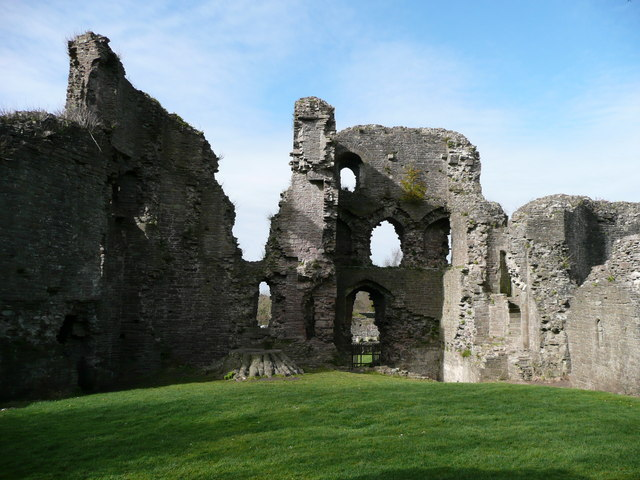
Abergavenny Castle in Monmouthshire, Wales, was one of the castles Bertha of Hereford brought to her husband William de Braose, 3rd Lord of Bramber

In 1150, Bertha married William de Braose, 3rd Lord of Bramber (1112–1192), son of Philip de Braose, 2nd Lord of Bramber and Aenor, daughter of Judael of Totnes. William and Bertha had three daughters and two sons, including William de Braose, 4th Lord of Bramber.

Bertha's brothers all died without issue. In 1173, she brought the Lordships and castles of Brecknock and Abergavenny, to her husband. Hay Castle had already passed to her from her mother, Sibyl of Neufmarche in 1165, whence it became part of the de Braose holdings.

In 1174, Bertha's husband became Sheriff of Hereford.

Bertha's children include

- William de Braose, 4th Lord of Bramber, (1144/1153 – 11 August 1211), married Maud de St. Valery, daughter of Bernard de St. Valery, by whom he had 16 children.
- Roger de Braose or Reynold de Briouse.
- Sibyl de Braose (died after 5 February 1227), married William de Ferrers, 3rd Earl of Derby (1136- 21 October 1190), son of Robert de Ferrers, 2nd Earl of Derby and Margaret Peverel, by whom she had issue.
- Maud de Braose, married John de Brompton, by whom she had issue.

== Legacy ==
Bertha died on an unknown date. She was the ancestress of many noble English families, which included the de Braoses, de Beauchamps, de Bohuns and de Ferrers; as well as the Irish families of de Lacy and de Burgh.

== Ancestry ==
Ancestors of Bertha of Hereford

Roger de Pitres
Walter FitzRoger de Pitres
Hamelin de Balun
Eunice de Balun
Miles de Gloucester, 1st Earl of Hereford
Hamelin de Balun
N.N. de Balun
Bertha de Balun of Bateden
Bertha of Hereford
Thurcytel de Neufmarché
Geoffrey de Neufmarché
Papia of England
Bernard de Neufmarché, Lord of Brecon
Richard FitzGulbert, Seigneur de Hugleville
Ada de Hugleville
Ada de Hugleville
Sibyl de Neufmarché
Richard FitzScrob
Osbern fitzRichard
N.N. de Essex
Nesta ferch Osbern
Gruffydd ap Llywelyn of Wales
Nest ferch Gruffydd
Edith of Mercia
