= Lordship of Brecknock =

Anglo-Norman marcher lordship

Lordship of Breckock Teyrnas Brycheiniog
- 1088–1535
- Status: Client state of the Kingdom of England
- Capital: Brecon
- Common languages: Welsh, English, Norman
- Government: Marcher Lordship
- Lord
  - 1088–1125: Bernard de Neufmarche
  - ?–1235: Peter FitzHerbert
  - 1235–1286: Sir Reginald Fitz Piers
- Historical era: Middle Ages
  - Norman conquest: 1088
  - Laws in Wales Acts: 1535
Preceded by	Succeeded by
Kingdom of Brycheiniog	Kingdom of England

The Lordship of Brecknock was an Anglo-Norman marcher lordship located in southern central Wales.

== Beginnings ==
In the century before the Lordship was founded, Brycheiniog had been contested between its traditional dynasty, and that of Ferlix (a realm at the heart of Rhwng Gwy a Hafren). No more of the traditional line is reported by historic manuscripts (such as those of Jesus College), beyond Tewdwr ap Griffri. The Book of Baglan reports that Bleddyn ap Maenyrch, heir of the traditional dynasty of Ferlix (who had by now lost Ferlix itself, to Elystan Glodrydd's heirs), was the King of Brycheiniog during the time of the Norman invasion of England (possibly by acquiring a claim through his mother, the niece of Tewdwr ap Griffri).

Though initially neutral on the matter, the Normans acquired a dim view of Welsh princes when many of the latter supported anti-Norman revolts by the Saxons (with whom the princes were allied), such as that of Eadric the Wild. After suppressing the Saxon part of Eadric's revolt, William FitzOsbern, 1st Earl of Hereford went on to defeat three prominent southern Welsh princes who had supported Eadric, including Rhys ap Tewdwr (son of Tewdwr ap Cadell), the powerful king of Deheubarth. Though Bleddyn had married Rhys' sister, the records do not mention him (or Brycheiniog) being involved.

Deheubarth had also been a contested realm over the previous century, in this case between the heirs of Maredudd ab Owain's daughter Angharad (such as Gruffydd ap Llywelyn), those of his brother Einion (such as Rhys ap Tewdwr), and the rulers of Morgannwg. In 1088, Gruffydd's son-in-law, and his son-in-law's son-in-law, Bernard de Neufmarché, took part in a rebellion against King William Rufus, without being punished for it. Emboldened by this, Bernard launched attacks on an area under Rhys' influence - Brycheiniog - while the sons of Bleddyn ap Cynfyn, Gruffydd's half-brother, attacked Deheubarth; this was likely a co-ordinated action between Bernard and Bleddyn ap Cynfyn's sons. Bleddyn ap Maenyrch was defeated at the Battle of Caer-Bannau (one of Bleddyn ap Maenyrch's castles, and a former Roman army camp), while Rhys was forced to flee to Ireland.

Rhys later re-established his position with Irish assistance, and in April 1093 he and Bleddyn attacked Bernard while he was building a castle at Brecon. The attack failed, and both Rhys and Bleddyn ap Maenyrch were killed. The Welsh Annales clearly state that Rhys was killed 'by the French who were inhabiting Brycheiniog' (implying that Bernard had already taken over the kingdom). Bernard established a Marcher Lordship in its place - the Lordship of Brecknock (the name being a Norman mangling of Brycheiniog). Bernard confined Bleddyn ap Maenyrch's eldest son, Gwrgan, in Brecon Castle (though Gwrgan was allowed to travel elsewhere, if accompanied by Bernard's knights); nevertheless, Bernard gave Gwrgan, and his brothers, some lands within Bernard's Lordship, to sustain their dignity (Gwgan initially receiving Cathedine).

Bernard was succeeded by his son, Mahel. However, Bernard's wife, Nesta, dramatically swore an oath, in the presence of King Henry I, that Mahel was illegitimate. Henry consequently ruled that the inheritance should be transferred to Sibyl, Bernard's daughter, who just happened to be married to Miles Fitz-Walter, a friend of Henry.

== Role in the revolt of 1136 ==
When Stephen de Blois broke his oath by displacing his cousin, Empress Matilda, from succeeding her father (Henry I) to the English throne, the conflict it caused eroded central authority in England, to such an extent that a state of anarchy broke out. By the following year - 1136 - a number of Welsh princes and magnates had begun to see this as an opportunity to recover lands they had lost to Marcher lords, and broke out in revolt.

The revolt began when Hywel ap Maredudd, a minor lord in the west of the Lordship of Brecknock, recruited an army and marched to the adjacent Lordship of Gower, defeating the Norman and English colonists there in the Battle of Llwchwr. Inspired by Hywel's success, Gruffydd ap Rhys, Prince of Deheubarth, hastened to meet with Gruffydd I of Gwynedd, his father-in-law, to enlist his aid. However, the opportunities presented by the anarchy worked both ways - the absence of Gruffydd ap Rhys from Deheubarth enabled Marcher lords to encroach further into Deheubarth. To resist the encroachment, Gruffydd ap Rhys' wife Gwenllian, Princess of Deheubarth (and Gwynedd), gathered a host; Gwenllian's forces, however, were defeated, with Gwenllian and two of her sons being killed in the battle.

Gwenllian's attempted defence nevertheless inspired further opposition to the Marcher Lords, ultimately leaving her son, Rhys ap Gruffydd as a much more powerful ruler than his parents had been. When Matilda and Stephen's differences were settled, and Matilda's son Henry II came to the throne, the renewed strength of central authority enabled Henry to push back Welsh princes to their pre-anarchy borders. The Lordship of Brecknock remained intact, and Sibyl's husband, Miles, remained its Lord.

== Sibyl's progeny ==
Sibyl's sister-in-law was married to Richard Fitz Pons, a powerful supporter of Bernard, who owned lands in Herefordshire close to the border of Brycheiniog (as well as elsewhere) - the Barony of Clifford. Bernard had assigned some of the land on the Brycheiniog side of the border with Clifford to Richard (as a barony within the Lordship of Brecknock); Richard built a castle there - Bronllys Castle. Bernard had similarly assigned a region in the north eastern corner of Brycheiniog to Philip Walwyn, who similarly built a castle - Hay Castle.

Subsequently, Hay Castle, and its surrounding land, was completely detached from the Lordship and given as a dowry to Sibyl's daughter Bertha, when she married William de Braose, 3rd Lord of Bramber, who already possessed the adjacent Lordship of Buellt. Years later, when Sibyl died, the rest of the Lordship of Brecknock was inherited by her son, Roger. However, Roger, who was childless, detached the region around Bronllys, the whole of the Cantref Selyf, and gave it as an independent Lordship to his cousin, Walter Fitz-Richard, the son of Richard Fitz-Pons.

Roger remained childless, so the remainder of the Lordship of Brecknock was inherited by each of his brothers in turn, all of them (Walter, Henry, Mahel, and William) dying childless. William, the last of these died while at Bronllys, when the castle caught fire, and a falling stone killed him. The lands held by William (which were more extensive than just the Lordship of Brecknock) were divided between his sisters; Bertha received Brecknock, which was consequently joined with her husband's Lordship of Buellt (and Hay re-attached to it).

== The de Braose inheritance ==
The lands of Bertha and her husband were inherited by their eldest son, William, who fell out with King John in a spectacular manner, consequently being forced into exile (where he died in penury), while his wife and eldest son were deliberately starved to death. In 1208, John seized William's paternal inheritance, and detached the eastern cantref of the Brecknock Lordship, erecting it into a new and distinct Marcher Lordship - the Lordship of Blaenllynfi (also known after its most significant town, Talgarth) - giving the latter to Peter FitzHerbert (the son of Bertha's co-heir, and sister, Lucy).

When King John's son, Henry III, acceded to the throne, he was keen to make peace with the barons after the problems his father had encountered. Henry restored William's paternal inheritance, and the surviving Lordship of Brecknock (i.e. without Blaenllynfi), to the Braose family, specifically Reginald de Braose, William's younger brother. Reginald's lands were inherited by his son, who unfortunately was survived only by daughters, so the lands were divided between them:

- Eva received the Lordship of Abergavenny; she married a minor noble, William de Cantilupe
- Maud received the Lordship of Radnor; her husband was Roger Mortimer (who, like his ancestors, had designs on the adjacent realm of Maelienydd)
- Isabella received the Lordship of Buellt, and subsequently married Dafydd ap Llywelyn (son of Llywelyn Fawr, the ruling prince of Gwynedd)
- Eleanor received the Lordship of Brecknock; her husband was Humphrey de Bohun, the Earl of Hereford

== Disputed Land ==
=== Mortimer ===
Mortimer was, however, aggrieved at the paucity of his reward, noting that the lands were not the same size, and feeling the division should have been more equal. Over the next 25 years, Mortimer, a major ally of king Henry III at a time when the King was facing opposition from many of his other Barons, managed to get the settlement re-adjusted, so that he would be officially allocated parts of the Lordship of Brecknock. The de Bohuns, however, stalled the hand-over.

Meanwhile, Llywelyn ap Gruffudd, nephew of Daffyd ap Llywelyn, and new ruling prince of Gwynedd, had taken advantage of the king's weakness to expand his own territory, eventually conquering the Lordships of Radnor and Brecknock, having already seized Buellt. In 1263, the king's son, Edward, launched a successful counter-attack, defeating Llywelyn; Edward awarded the whole Lordship of Brecknock to Mortimer (the king's ally) not de Bohun (an opponent of the king).

Two months later, the Second Barons' War broke out; Mortimer and de Bohun were on opposing sides. In 1266, Mortimer's army was near-obliterated, but later that year the War was all-but-ended in the king's favour. Mortimer brokered a peace with de Bohun, surrendering the Lordship of Brecknock to him.

=== Llywelyn (again) ===
During the Second Baron's War, Llywelyn had become an ally of Simon de Montfor, the king's arch-enemy, when Simon offered to restore Llywelyn to the territorial gains he had previously been forced to relinquish by Edward. This had been formalised in the Treaty of Pipton. Llywelyn used this, and Mortimer's weakness, to re-expand Gwyneddian power, meaning that de Bohun, despite Mortimer's reluctant consent, still wasn't able to enjoy the Lordship of Brecknock.

Though Simon's actions were treason, the King saw, following the War, that they presented a way to remove a potential source of further opposition; with a population fatigued of war, and many Barons who had previously opposed the King, stability was the important thing. The king and Llywelyn agreed the Treaty of Montgomery, by which - though nominally now a vassal of the king, Llywelyn received the Lordship of Brecknock.

However, a decade later, after Henry had been succeeded by his son (Edward), Llywelyn married de Montfort's daughter, Eleanor, so Edward declared Llywelyn a rebel, and attacked Gwynedd. In 1277 Llywelyn was forced to agree the Treaty of Aberconwy, which limited Llywelyn's authority to Gwynedd alone. De Bohun was finally Lord of Brecknock.

=== de Clare ===
Towards the end of his life, in 1291, Humphrey fell into dispute with Gilbert de Clare about the border between their lands. Humphrey as well as being Lord of Brecknock was Earl of Hereford, while Gilbert was Lord of Glamorgan and Earl of Gloucester. In order to prevent War (as Marcher Lords they had the right to War with each other, in their Marcher Lordships), Edward (now king) insisted that the matter should be brought before his court before any further action was taken.

Unfortunately, Gilbert's tenants then took it upon themselves to act, stealing cattle from those of Humphrey, so Humphrey's tenants counter-attacked. The king was extremely angered by this, and ordered that the Lordships of Brecknock and Glamorgan be forfeit. Subsequently, Humphrey and Gilbert settled their differences and persuaded the king to commute the decision in return for large sums of cash.

== Edward II & Hugh Despencer ==
When King Edward II began his rule, the childless John Fitz-Reginald, heir of Peter Fitz-Herbert, granted the reversion of all his lands (including the Lordship of Blaenllynfi) to the king. In 1309 the king issued a charter, granting them to Rhys ap Hywel, descendant and heir of Gwgan, in gratitude of Philip's loyalty to Edward's father; Fitz-Reginald had already given Philip baronial rights to a manor within the Lordship. The Bronllys Lordship was at this time held by Walter Fitz-Richard's heir, Maud, daughter of John Giffard, 1st Baron Giffard. When she died, in 1311, without immediate heirs, King Edward transferred the Bronllys Lordship to Rhys ap Hywel as well.

Humphrey de Bohun was succeeded by his son, Humphrey, one of the ardent opponents of King Edward II's boyfriend, Piers Gaveston, and then of his subsequent boyfriend, Hugh Despenser. While in revolt against the latter at the Battle of Boroughbridge, Humphrey was killed, so Edward declared Humphrey's lands forfeit and gave them (including the Lordship of Brecknock) to Hugh. Rhys had similarly rebelled, so again Edward seized Rhys' lands and gave them to Hugh, re-uniting the whole Lordship of Brecknock.

The leader of the revolt (other than Humphrey) was Roger Mortimer, who had been renting Buellt from Queen Isabella (Isabella having received it from Edward). Since the Queen herself was a supporter of the revolt, regarding Hugh Despencer as having destroyed her marriage to Edward, the King naturally seized Buellt too, and added it to Hugh's Lordship.

Five years later, in 1326, Roger and Isabella (now Roger's lover), having fled to the continuent in the interim, returned and launched a coup against Edward and Hugh. According to the annals of Newenham Abbey, the king and his husband fled to Wales. They were caught there by a search party, containing Rhys ap Hywel, ultimately leading to their deaths. Roger Mortimer, now in effective control of the country (ostensibly on behalf of Edward's son, but in reality for his own benefit), restored the status quo ante as best he could; Rhys ap Hywel was restored to his portion of the Lordship of Brecknock, while Humphrey's son, John de Bohun received the rest.

== Later De Bohun lords ==
John was succeeded by his brother, Humphrey, while Rhys was succeeded by his son, Philip ap Rhys. However, King Edward III, after taking control of government from Roger Mortimer (whom he had executed for treason), allowed himself to be persuaded that a place like the Lordship of Brecknock should be ruled by a powerful magnate (like Humphrey) not a weak one (like Philip). Edward consequently transferred Philip's portion of the Lordship to Humphrey, re-uniting the Lordship once again; Philip was compensated with a manor in Shropshire (Shifnal).

Humphrey's son, Humphrey, succeeded him in turn. This Humphrey only had daughters so the land then went into abeyance. However, Humphrey's younger daughter, Mary, had married Henry Bolinbroke, who by now had usurped the throne, as Henry IV; Henry used his (usurped) authority and terminated the abeyance in Mary's favour - effectively transferring the lands to himself (by jure uxoris).

Nevertheless, Anne of Gloucester, daughter of Mary de Bohun's elder sister Eleanor, petitioned Henry for her grandfathers lands - which should rightly be hers - to be returned to her. The Lordship of Brecknock was then ruled by Anne's descendants, the Earls of Buckingham. When her great-great-grandson, Edward Stafford, 3rd Duke of Buckingham, was executed for treason, having been suspected of plotting against King Henry VIII, the Lordship was forfeited to the crown, and re-combined it with Buellt (which the crown still possessed, and had stopped renting out to Mortimer's heirs when the latter merged with the crown), as it had been last time it was a crown possession.

By his Laws in Wales Acts, Henry converted the combined territory - the Lordships of Brecknock and Buellt - into Brecknockshire, subject to standard English law.
