= Humphrey III de Bohun =

12th-century Anglo-Norman nobleman

Humphrey III de Bohun (before 1144 – ? December 1181) of Trowbridge Castle in Wiltshire and of Caldicot Castle in south-east Wales, feudal baron of Trowbridge, was an Anglo-Norman nobleman and general who served King Henry II as Lord High Constable of England.

== Origins ==
Humphrey was the son and heir of Humphrey II de Bohun (died 1164/1165) of Trowbridge Castle and of Caldicot Castle, feudal baron of Trowbridge, and his wife Margaret of Hereford. Margaret was a daughter of Miles of Gloucester, Earl of Hereford (died 1143), Sheriff of Gloucestershire and Constable of England, and Sibyl de Neufmarché.

== Career ==
By 29 September 1165, Humphrey had succeeded to his father's estates, which he owed three hundred marks to the king as feudal relief for the barony. From 1166 onwards, he held his mother's inheritance, both her Bohun lands in Wiltshire and her inheritance from her father and brothers.

As Constable, Humphrey sided with King Henry II during the Revolt of 1173–1174. In August 1173, he was with the king and the royal army at Breteuil in France. Later that same year, he and Richard de Lucy led the sack of Berwick-upon-Tweed and invaded Lothian to attack William the Lion, King of Scotland, who had sided with the rebels. He returned to England and played a major role in the defeat and capture of Robert Blanchemains, Earl of Leicester, at Fornham. By the end of 1174, he was in Normandy, where he witnessed the Treaty of Falaise between Henry and William of Scotland.

== Marriage and children ==
At sometime between February 1171 and Easter 1175 Humphrey married Margaret of Huntingdon, widow of Conan IV, Duke of Brittany (d.1171) and a daughter of Henry of Scotland, son of King David I of Scotland and Queen Maud. It has been suggested that Humphrey's wife was the Margaret who married Pedro Manrique de Lara, a Spanish nobleman, but there are discrepancies in the theory.

With his marriage, Humphrey became a brother-in-law of his enemy, William of Scotland. Margaret and Humphrey had the following children:

- Henry de Bohun, 1st Earl of Hereford, who was created Earl of Hereford by King John in April 1200.
- Matilda de Bohun.
- Margaret, who married Waleran de Beaumont, 4th Earl of Warwick.

== Death and burial ==
According to Robert of Torigni, in late 1181 Humphrey joined Henry the Young King in leading an army against Philip of Alsace, Count of Flanders, in support of King Philip II of France, during which campaign he died. He was buried at Llanthony Secunda Priory in Gloucestershire, founded in 1136 by his maternal grandfather Miles de Gloucester, 1st Earl of Hereford as a secondary house for the monks of Llanthony Priory in the Vale of Ewyas, in what is now Monmouthshire, Wales.

== Sources ==
- Crouch, David (2011). The English Aristocracy, 1070–1272: A Social Transformation. Yale University Press.
- Pollock, M. A. (2015). Scotland, England and France After the Loss of Normandy, 1204–1296. The Boydell Press.
- Sanders, I. J. (1960). English Baronies: A Study of their Origin and Descent 1086–1327. Oxford University Press.
