= Sibyl de Neufmarché =

12th-century Welsh noblewoman

- Countess of Hereford suo jure Lady of Brecknock
- Born: c.1100 Brecon Castle, Brecon, Wales
- Died: after 1143; Llanthony Secunda Priory, Gloucester, England
- Buried: Llanthony Secunda Priory
- Noble family: Neufmarché
- Spouse: Miles de Gloucester, 1st Earl of Hereford
- Issue: Margaret of Hereford; Roger Fitzmiles, 2nd Earl of Hereford; Walter de Hereford; Henry Fitzmiles; Mahel de Hereford; William de Hereford; Bertha of Hereford; Lucy of Hereford
- Father: Bernard de Neufmarché, Lord of Brecon
- Mother: Nest ferch Osbern

Sibyl de Neufmarché, Countess of Hereford, suo jure Lady of Brecknock (c. 1100 – after 1143), was a Cambro-Norman noblewoman, heiress to one of the most substantial fiefs in the Welsh Marches. The great-granddaughter of Gruffydd ap Llywelyn, king of Wales, Sibyl was also connected to the nobility of England and Normandy. Sibyl inherited the titles and lands of her father, Bernard de Neufmarché, Lord of Brecon, after her mother, Nest ferch Osbern, had declared her brother Mahel to have been illegitimate. Most of these estates passed to Sibyl's husband, Miles de Gloucester, 1st Earl of Hereford, as her dowry. Their marriage had been arranged personally by King Henry I of England in the spring of 1121. Sibyl, with her extensive lands, was central to the King's plans of consolidating Anglo-Norman power in south-east Wales by the merging of her estates with those of Miles, his loyal subject on whom he relied to implement Crown policy.

As an adult, Sibyl lived through King Stephen's turbulent reign, known to history as the Anarchy, in which her husband played a pivotal role. Following Miles' accidental death in 1143, Sibyl entered a religious life at Llanthony Secunda Priory, Gloucestershire, England, which she had endowed up to six years previously. Sibyl is buried at the priory, founded by Miles in 1136.

== Family ==
=== Ancestry ===
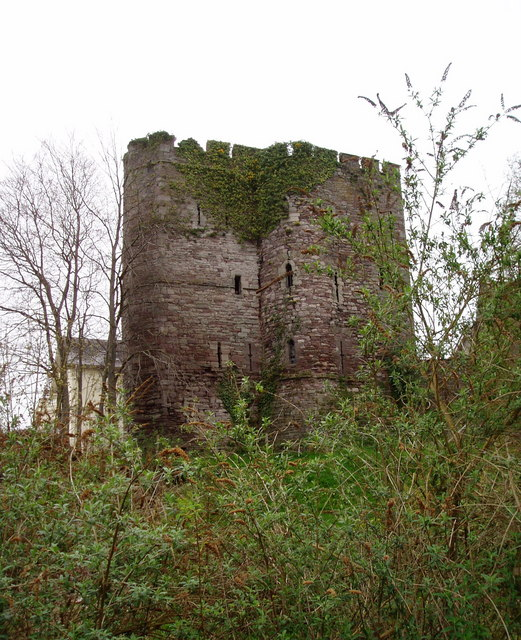
Ruins of Brecon castle Sibyl's birthplace and a part of her vast inheritance

Sibyl was born in about 1100 in Brecon Castle, Brecon, Wales, the only daughter of Marcher Lord Bernard de Neufmarché, Lord of Brecon, and Nest ferch Osbern. Nest was the daughter of Osbern FitzRichard and Nest ferch Gruffydd and granddaughter of Gruffydd ap Llywelyn, king of Wales, and Ealdgyth of Mercia.

Sibyl's father, Bernard, was born at the castle of Le Neuf-Marché-en-Lions, on the frontier between Normandy and Beauvais. Bernard was a knight who had fought under English kings William I, William Rufus and Henry I. According to historian Lynn H Nelson, Bernard de Neufmarché was "the first of the original conquerors of Wales". He led the Norman army at the Battle of Brecon in 1093, during which Rhys ap Tewdwr was killed. Kingship in Wales ended with Rhys' death, and allowed Bernard to confirm his hold on Brycheiniog, becoming the first ruler of the Lordship of Brecknock. The title and lands would remain in his family's possession until 1521. The name Neufmarché, Novo Mercato in Latin, is anglicised into 'Newmarket' or 'Newmarch'. (Note: According to Gerald of Wales, when Bernard witnessed a charter issued by William I in 1086-87, he signed his name in Latin as Bernardus de Novo Mercato (Gerald of Wales, p.88))

=== Inheritance ===
Sibyl had two brothers, Philip, who most likely died young, and Mahel. Nest had Mahel disinherited by swearing to King Henry I of England that Mahel had been fathered by another man. According to Giraldus Cambrensis, this was done out of vengeance when Mahel had mutilated Nest's lover, a knight whose identity is not disclosed. In the 19th century, Bernard Bolingbroke Woodward proposed that, after Bernard's death, Nest "disgraced herself with an intrigue" with one of his soldiers. Mahel, who had by this time inherited Bernard's estates, disapproved of the liaison to such an extent that he killed Nest's lover. Nest's revenge was to have Mahel disinherited by claiming that Bernard was not Mahel's father. The maritagium (marriage charter) arranged by King Henry I in 1121 for the marriage between Sibyl and her future husband Miles, however, makes it clear that Bernard was still alive when it was written; showing Bernard Bolingbroke Woodward's version of the story to diverge from the known facts. Author Jennifer C. Ward suggests that, although the marriage charter recorded that King Henry was acting at the request of Bernard, Nest, and the barons, it was probable he had put considerable pressure on the Neufmarchés to disinherit Mahel in favour of Sibyl and, thereby, Miles. Nevertheless, whatever the timing or reason, the outcome of Nest's declaration was that Sibyl (whom Nest acknowledged as Bernard's child) became the sole lawful heiress to the vast Lordship of Brecon, one of the most important and substantial fiefs in the Welsh Marches. Henry's maritagium referred specifically to Sibyl's parents' lands as "comprising Talgarth, the forest of Ystradwy, the castle of Hay, the whole land of Brecknock, up to the boundaries of the land of Richard Fitz Pons, namely up to Brecon and Much Cowarne, a vill in England"; the fees and services of several named individuals were also granted as part of the dowry. This made her suo jure Lady of Brecknock on her father's death, and one of the wealthiest heiresses in south Wales.

== Marriage ==
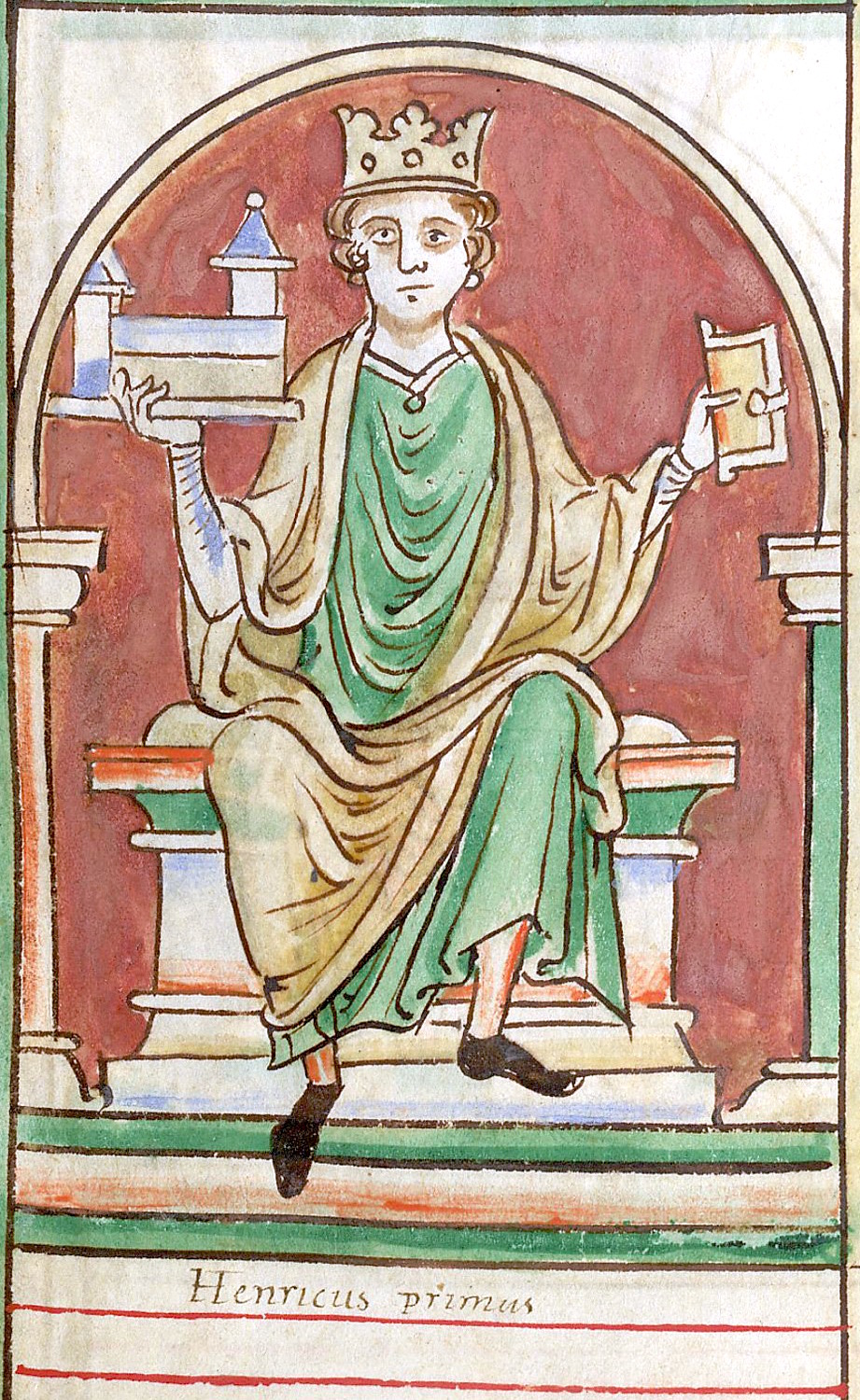
King Henry I of England who granted Sibyl in marriage to Miles de Gloucester

Sometime in April or May 1121, Sibyl married Miles (or Milo) FitzWalter de Gloucester, who on his father's death in 1129, became sheriff of Gloucester, and Constable of England. The marriage was personally arranged by King Henry I, to whom Miles was a trusted royal official. A charter written in Latin (the maritagium), which dates to 10 April/29 May 1121, records the arrangements for the marriage of Sibyl and Miles. Historian C. Warren Hollister found the charter's wording telling, noting that "the king gave the daughter as if he were making a grant of land": "Know that I [King Henry I] have given and firmly granted to Miles of Gloucester Sibyl, daughter of Bernard de Neufmarché, together with all the lands of Bernard her father and of her mother after their deaths ... ". Her parents' lands would be conveyed to Miles after their deaths or earlier during "their life if they so wish". Henry also commanded that the fief's tenants were to pay Miles liege homage as their lord.

By arranging a series of matrimonial alliances, similar to that between Sibyl and Miles, King Henry I of England transformed "the map of territorial power in south-east Wales". Such arrangements were mutually advantageous. Hollister describes Miles' marriage to Sibyl as having been a "crucial breakthrough in his career". The new lords, in similar positions to Miles, were the King's own loyal vassals, on whom he could rely to implement royal policy. Sibyl's father died sometime before 1128 (most probably in 1125), and Miles came into possession of her entire inheritance, which when merged with his own estates, formed one honour.

=== Children ===
Together Sibyl and Miles had eight children:

- Margaret of Hereford (1122/1123- 6 April 1197), married Humphrey II de Bohun, by whom she had children. She received the office of constable of England and exercised lordship of Herefordshire as a widow until her death.
- Roger Fitzmiles, 2nd Earl of Hereford (before 1125- 22 September 1155). Roger's marriage settlement with Cecily FitzJohn (her first marriage), daughter of Payn FitzJohn and Sibyl de Lacy, was ratified by King Stephen in 1137. The marriage was childless as were Cecily's subsequent marriages.
- Walter de Hereford (died 1159/60), whether he married is unknown; however, Walter departed for Palestine on Michaelmas 1159, and died shortly afterwards without leaving legitimate issue
- Henry Fitzmiles (died c.1162), married a woman named Isabella, surname unknown; Henry died without legitimate issue.
- Mahel de Hereford (died 1164), no record of marriage; died without legitimate issue.
- William de Hereford (died 1166), no record of marriage; died without legitimate issue.
- Bertha of Hereford (c.1130-), married William de Braose, 3rd Lord of Bramber, by whom she had issue.
- Lucy of Hereford, Lady of Blaen Llyfni and Bwlch y Dinas (died 1219/20), married Herbert FitzHerbert of Winchester, by whom she had issue.

== The Anarchy ==
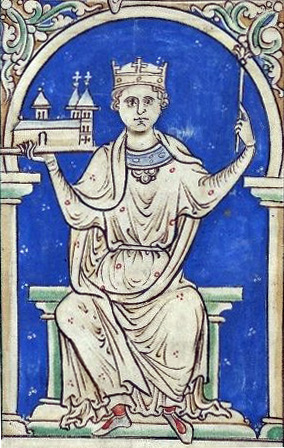
Stephen of Blois whose chaotic reign in England became known as the Anarchy

After Henry I's death in 1135, the throne of England was seized by Stephen of Blois, a grandson of William I of England. Henry's daughter, Empress Matilda (Maud), also claimed the throne, and had the support of the Marcher Lords. On the death of her husband, the Holy Roman Emperor, Henry V, in 1125, Matilda had returned to England for the first time in 16 years. At the insistence of her father, the barons (including Stephen) swore to uphold Matilda's rights as his heir. Matilda married Geoffrey of Anjou in 1128. They lived together in France, having three sons; the eldest of whom was to become King Henry II of England. Initially, Miles supported Stephen. In about 1136, Stephen granted Sibyl's husband the entire honour of Gloucester and Brecknock, and appointed him Constable of Gloucester Castle, whereby Miles became known as one of Stephen's "henchmen". Miles received Stephen at Gloucester in May 1138 and participated in his the kings' siege of Shrewsbury.

Llanthony Priory had been established near Crucorney, in the Vale of Ewyas, in 1118; Wales' earliest Augustine monastery. Miles' father, Walter de Gloucester, had retired there by 1126. The unrest that had been simmering in Wales during the last years of Henry's reign, boiled over in 1135 on his death. The area around the priory returned to Welsh rule, coming under such “hostile molestation” from the Welsh that the non-Welsh canons decided to leave. Miles established a new Priory for them in Gloucester, England, which they called Llanthony Secunda, in 1136. Sometime after 1137, Sibyl, together with her husband, made a further endowment to Llanthony Secunda.

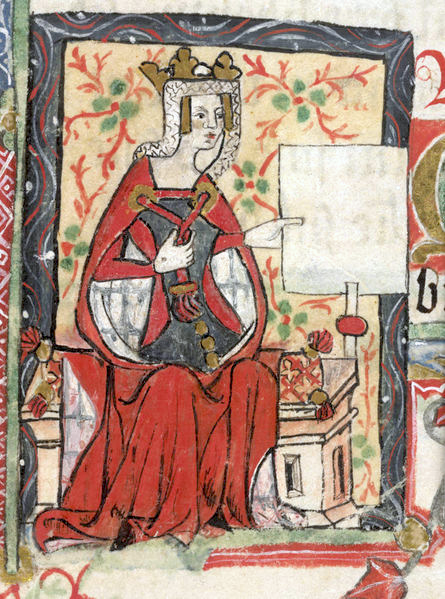
Empress Matilda whom Sibyl supported in opposition to King Stephen

Miles transferred his allegiance to Empress Matilda, on her return to England in 1139. According to Professor Edmund King, Miles' decision to support Matilda was guided by expediency rather than principle, and the necessity of joining forces with Matilda's illegitimate half-brother, the powerful Robert, Earl of Gloucester, who was the overlord of some of Miles' fiefs. Stephen stripped Miles of the title 'Constable of England' in punishment for having deserted him. On 25 July 1141, in gratitude for his support and military assistance and, according to historian R.H.C. Davis, possibly to compensate Miles for having appeared to have lost the constableship, Matilda invested him as 1st Earl of Hereford. He also received St. Briavels Castle and the Forest of Dean. At the time Matilda was the de facto ruler of England, Stephen having been imprisoned at Bristol following his capture the previous February after the Battle of Lincoln. Sibyl was styled Countess of Hereford, until Miles' unexpected death over two years later. In 1141, Miles received the honour of Abergavenny from Brien FitzCount, the (likely illegitimate) son of Duke Alan IV of Brittany. This was in appreciation of the skilled military tactics Miles had deployed which had spared Brien's castle of Wallingford during King Stephen's besiegement in 1139/1140. Matilda gave her permission for the transfer.

During the Anarchy, which the period of Stephen's reign as King of England was to become known, life was greatly disrupted in her husband's lands. Sibyl would have doubtless suffered as a result, especially after Miles' decision to support Matilda's claim to the throne and to oppose Stephen. When Matilda was defeated at Winchester in late 1141, Miles was compelled to return to Gloucester in disgrace: "weary, half-naked and alone". In November of that same year, Stephen was released from prison and restored to the English throne.

Sibyl's distress would have been heightened in 1143 after the Bishop of Hereford, Robert de Bethune placed an interdict upon Hereford, blocked all the cathedral's entrances with thorns, and excommunicated Miles. In order to raise money to pay his troops and to assist Matilda financially, Miles had imposed a levy on all the churches in his earldom, an act which the bishop had regarded as unlawful. When the bishop protested and threatened Miles with excommunication, Miles in response, sent his men to plunder the diocese of its resources. In retaliation against Miles' earlier attacks on the royalist city of Worcester and the castles of Hereford and Wallingford, King Stephen bestowed the title "Earl of Hereford" on Robert de Beaumont, 2nd Earl of Leicester; Miles, however, never surrendered the earldom nor the title to Robert de Beaumont.

== Widowhood and death ==
While on a deer-hunting expedition in his own Forest of Dean, Sibyl's husband was accidentally shot in the chest by an arrow which killed him on 24 December 1143. He had been involved in legal proceedings against the bishop's jurisdiction when he died. Their eldest son, Roger succeeded him in the earldom. In protest against his father's excommunication, Roger remained an outspoken enemy of the Church until close to the end of his life when he entered a Gloucester monastery as a monk. After her husband's death, Sibyl entered a religious life at Llanthony Secunda Priory, Gloucester, which she had previously endowed. Sibyl was buried in the same priory, the dates of death and burial unrecorded.

== Sibyl's legacy ==
Upon the childless death of Roger in 1155, the Earldom of Hereford fell into abeyance until 1199 when King John bestowed the title on Henry de Bohun, Sibyl's grandson through her eldest daughter, Margaret. As her sons all died without legitimate offspring, Sibyl's three daughters became co-heirs to the Brecon honour, with Bertha, the second daughter, passing Sibyl's inheritance on (through marriage) to the de Braoses, thereby making them one of the most powerful families in the Welsh Marches.

The Brecknock lordship would eventually go to the de Bohuns, by way of Eleanor de Braose. Eleanor, a descendant of Sibyl's through Bertha of Hereford, married Humphrey de Bohun, son of the 2nd Earl of Hereford. Eleanor and Humphrey's son, Humphrey de Bohun, succeeded his grandfather to the titles in 1275.
