= Llanthony Secunda Priory =

Building in Gloucester, Gloucestershire, England

Coordinates: 51°51′36″N 2°15′25″W

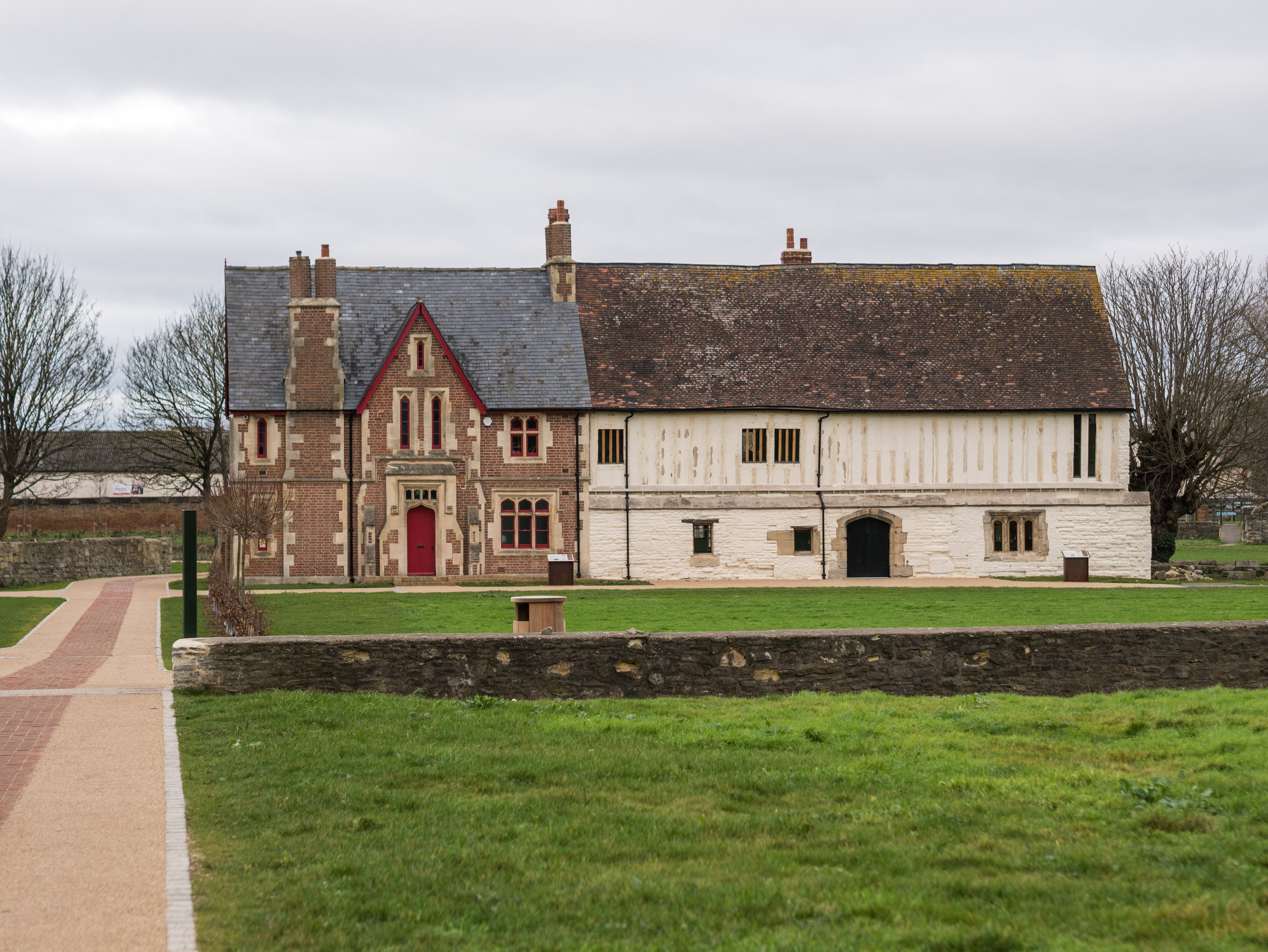
- The priory in 2019
- Interactive map of Llanthony Secunda Priory
- Location: Gloucester
- OS grid reference: SO 82406 17968

History
- Built: 1136

Site notes
- Governing body: English Heritage

Scheduled monument
- Official name: Llanthony Secunda Priory
- Reference no.: 1002091

Listed Building – Grade I
- Official name: Llanthony Priory, Remains of Range on South Side of Inner Court
- Designated: 23 January 1952
- Reference no.: 1271697

Llanthony Secunda Priory was a house of Augustinian canons in the parish of Hempsted, Gloucestershire, England, situated about half a mile south-west of Gloucester Castle in the City of Gloucester. It was founded in 1136 by Miles de Gloucester, 1st Earl of Hereford, a great magnate based in the west of England and the Welsh Marches, hereditary Constable of England and Sheriff of Gloucestershire (who resided at Gloucester Castle), as a secondary house and refuge for the canons of Llanthony Priory in the Vale of Ewyas, within his Lordship of Brecknock in what is now Monmouthshire, Wales. The surviving remains of the Priory were designated as Grade I listed in 1952 and the wider site is a scheduled ancient monument. In 2013, the Llanthony Secunda Priory Trust received funds for restoration work, which was completed in August 2018 when it re-opened to the public.

== History ==
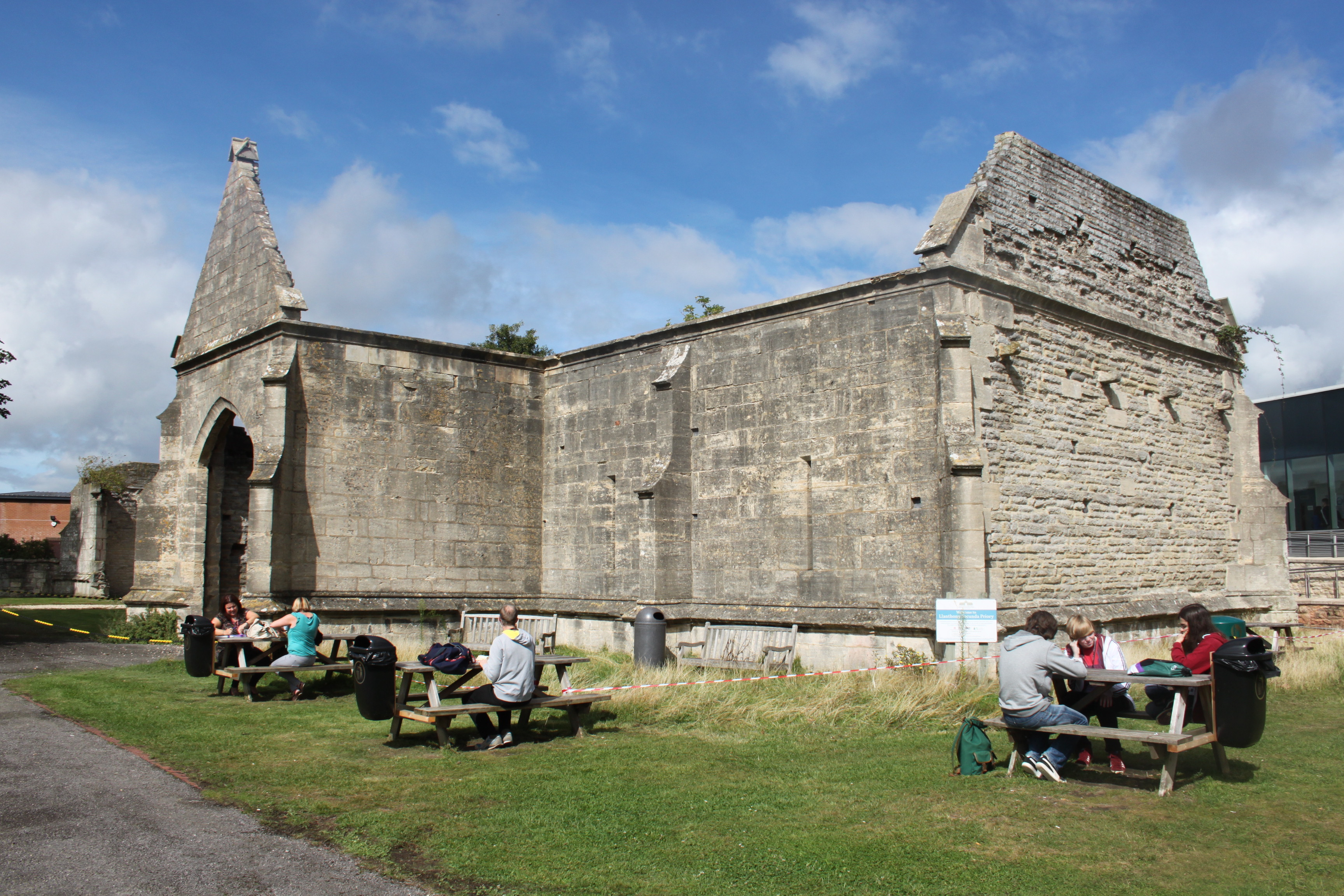
Remains of Tythe Barn on North Side of Inner Court

In 1135 after persistent attacks from the local Welsh population, the canons of Llanthony Priory retreated to Gloucester where they founded a secondary cell, called Llanthony Secunda.

Llanthony Secunda was known for cheese-making; in 1502 the Archbishop of Canterbury and the Prior of Llanthony gave presents of "Lanthony Cheese" to Elizabeth of York, the wife of Henry VII. In 1530 the prior of Llanthony at Gloucester sent "cheese, carp and baked lampreys" to King Henry VIII at Windsor. It was customary at the commencement of the fishing season to send the sovereign the first lamprey caught in the river. The intermittent custom of the City of Gloucester to present the sovereign at Christmas with a lamprey pie with a raised crust may have originated in the time of King Henry I, who was inordinately fond of lamprey and who frequently held his court at Gloucester during the Christmas season. At the Dissolution of the Monasteries the priory and its lands near Gloucester were granted by the Crown to Arthur Porter.

=== Humpty Dumpty ===
During the Siege of Gloucester, a Royalist cannon, shipped in from Holland to Bristol and from there to Gloucester, was placed on the walls of Llanthony Secunda and directed at Gloucester's City Wall. It was hoped by the besieging monarch, Charles I, that this cannon would break the siege and win him control of the city. The cannon misfired, however, exploding on the first shot. Some believe this to have been the origin of the Humpty Dumpty nursery rhyme, but this is disputed. The true origins of Humpty Dumpty are unknown, but the idea that it refers to the Royalist cannon during the Siege of Gloucester is still often cited as fact.

== Llanthony Weir and Lock ==
Llanthony has given its name to a weir on the River Severn, which is the normal tidal limit on the East Channel of the river, and the disused Llanthony Lock, both built about 1870. Llanthony Lock was purchased by the Herefordshire & Gloucestershire Canal Trust in 2008 to restore the link between that canal and Gloucester Docks.

== Burials at Llanthony Secunda Priory ==
- Miles of Gloucester, 1st Earl of Hereford, the founder, buried in the chapter house of Llanthony Secunda Priory;
- Sibyl de Neufmarché, wife of the founder;
- Roger Fitzmiles, 2nd Earl of Hereford, Llanthony Secunda Priory, son of founder;
- Mahel de Hereford, Llanthony Secunda Priory, son of founder;
- Henry FitzMiles, Llanthony Secunda Priory, son of founder;
- Margaret of Hereford (d.1187), eldest daughter and eventual co-heiress of founder, who inherited the patronage of Llanthony Secunda Priory, wife of Humphrey II de Bohun (d.1165)
- Henry de Bohun, Llanthony Secunda Priory
- Humphrey de Bohun, 2nd Earl of Hereford, Llanthony Secunda Priory
- Anne of Gloucester, (1383–1438) eldest daughter of Thomas of Woodstock, Duke of Gloucester and Eleanor de Bohun. Buried Llanthony Secunda Priory;
- William Bourchier, 1st Count of Eu, husband of Anne of Gloucester;
- Eleanor de Braose, wife of Humphrey de Bohun, son and heir apparent of Humphrey IV de Bohun, 2nd Earl of Hereford, 1st Earl of Essex (1204–1275), by whom she had issue, including Humphrey de Bohun, 3rd Earl of Hereford. She was herself descended from the founder's 2nd daughter and eventual co-heiress Bertha of Hereford who married William de Braose (d.1192), Lord of Bramber, Sussex.

== See also ==
- Prior of Lanthony Secunda
