= Margaret of Hereford =

English noblewoman

- Born: 1122/1123; England
- Died: 6 April 1197
- Burial place: Llanthony Secunda Priory, Gloucester, England
- Occupation: Constable of England
- Spouse: Humphrey II de Bohun
- Children: Humphrey III de Bohun; Milo de Bohun; Richard de Bohun; Matilda de Bohun; Margery de Bohun
- Parent(s): Miles de Gloucester, 1st Earl of Hereford; Sibyl de Neufmarché

Margaret of Hereford (also Margaret de Bohun née Margaret of Gloucester, 1122/1123 – 6 April 1197) was an English noblewoman and the eldest daughter of Miles de Gloucester, 1st Earl of Hereford by his wife, the wealthy Cambro-Norman heiress Sibyl de Neufmarché. Margaret married Humphrey II de Bohun, by whom she had five children. Margaret held the office of Constable of England and as a widow, exercised lordship of Herefordshire until her own death. She was the benefactress of several religious institutions.

== Family ==
Margaret was born in about 1122/1123, the eldest child of Miles de Gloucester, 1st Earl of Hereford and Sibyl de Neufmarché, heiress to one of the most substantial fiefs in the Welsh Marches. She had five younger brothers and two sisters. These were: Roger Fitzmiles, 2nd Earl of Hereford, Walter de Hereford, Henry Fitzmiles, Mahel de Hereford, William de Hereford, Bertha of Hereford, and Lucy of Hereford. The Historia fundationis cum fundatoris genealogia of Abergavenny Priory named Margaretam, Bertram and Luciam as the three daughters of Miles and Sibyl.

== Marriage and issue ==
Margaret married Humphrey II de Bohun, an Anglo-Norman aristocrat and steward of King Henry I of England, on an unknown date before 1139. Like Margaret's father, Humphrey later supported Empress Matilda against her rival King Stephen during the period of civil war that raged over England, known to history as The Anarchy. Together, Margaret and her husband founded Farleigh Priory, although the charter is undated. The marriage produced a total of five children:

- Humphrey III de Bohun (died 1180), married as his second wife, Scottish princess Margaret of Huntingdon, Duchess of Brittany, by whom he had issue. He held the office of Constable of England.
- Milo de Bohun (died young)
- Richard de Bohun (died young)
- Matilda de Bohun (1140/1143 – after 1194/1199), married firstly Henry d'Oilly, by whom she had issue; secondly, Juhel de Mayenne; and thirdly, Walter FitzRobert.
- Margery de Bohun (died before 1196), married Waleran de Beaumont, 4th Earl of Warwick, although, Warwick's wife is alternatively named as Margery d'Oilly, who was her niece. The 1192 birthdate of his son and heir makes Margery d'Oilly the likely spouse.

== Lordship of Herefordshire and Constable of England ==
Following the death of her father in a hunting accident in 1143, and sometime before Margaret's husband died in about 1165, all five of her brothers died without legitimate offspring. After her eldest brother Roger's death, the earldom of Hereford fell into abeyance. As a consequence of these events, Miles' lands and properties were divided between Margaret and her two sisters. Being the eldest daughter, she received the lordship of Herefordshire and the office of Constable of England. This office was later passed to her eldest son Humphrey, grandson Henry, and would continue to be held by her direct descendants. As a widow she exercised lordship until her own death, over thirty years later. In her book Women of the English Nobility and Gentry 1066–1500, Jennifer C. Ward described Margaret as having exemplified "the roles which a woman could play in her estates". As lady of Herefordshire, she fulfilled her duties to her overlord King Henry II, having in 1166 returned the carta which named her knights; it documented 17 knights' fees of the old enfeoffment and three and three quarters of the new. She aided the King in the marriage of one of his daughters, and in 1167–1168 made an account to the Red Book of the Exchequer for her assistance. She also accounted to the Exchequer at the end of King Henry's reign and during that of his successor, King Richard I for scutage due to her from her vast holdings. In the lordship over which she ruled, she used her father as role model, having confirmed earlier grants of land to her tenants and made her own land grants to those who served her well.

Margaret was a generous benefactress of several religious institutions, and she strove to carry out her late brothers' grants. She gave all her land in Quedgeley, Gloucestershire for the salvation of her brothers' souls. Her own grant was given to save the souls of King Henry II, her children, parents, husband, and the rest of her family.

== Death and legacy ==
Margaret died on 6 April 1197 and was buried in Llanthony Secunda Priory in Gloucester which had been founded by her father and where her mother, Sibyl had entered a religious life after her husband's untimely death. Margaret herself had made endowments to the Augustinian priory.

Two years following Margaret's death, King John confirmed the possessions of Llanthony Secunda Priory by charter which was dated 30 July 1199. These included the donation of duas partes de Onedesleye made by Margar de Bohun in accordance with the division made inter ipsam et Luciam suam sororem. On 28 April 1200, King John recreated the earldom of Hereford for Margaret's grandson Henry, of whom she had had custody during his minority.
