= William de Braose, 3rd Lord of Bramber =

12th-century Marcher Lord (1112–1192)

William de Braose
- 3rd Lord of Bramber
- Died: after 1179
- Noble family: House of Braose
- Spouses: Bertha, daughter of Miles of Gloucester and Sibyl de Neufmarché
- Issue: William de Braose, 4th Lord of Bramber
- Father: Philip de Braose
- Mother: Aenor de Totnes, daughter of Juhel of Totnes

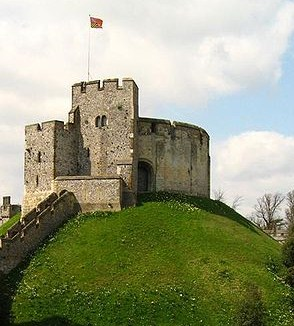
Arundel castle's 12th-century keep. Empress Maud was escorted from Arundel to Bristol by William de Braose.

William de Braose, 3rd Lord of Bramber (fl. 1135–1179) was a 12th-century Marcher lord who secured a foundation for the dominant position later held by the Braose family in the Welsh Marches. In addition to the family's English holdings in Sussex and Devon, William had inherited Radnor and Builth, in Wales, from his father Philip. By his marriage he increased the Braose Welsh holdings to include Brecon and Abergavenny.

William remained loyal to King Stephen during the 12th-century period of civil war. He became a trusted royal servant during the subsequent reign of Henry II, accompanying the king on campaigns in France and Ireland. He served as sheriff of Herefordshire from 1173 until 1175. The family's power reached its peak under his son William during the reigns of kings Richard I and John.

== Lands and family ==
William was the eldest son of Philip de Braose, lord of Bramber. His mother was Aenor, daughter of Juhel of Totnes. He was the third in the line of the Anglo-Norman Braose family founded by his grandfather, the first William de Braose. After his father died in the 1130s William inherited lordships, land and castles in Sussex, with his caput at Bramber. He also held Totnes in Devon, and Radnor and Builth in the Welsh Marches. He confirmed the grants of his father and grandfather to the abbey of St Florent in Anjou and made further grants to the abbey's dependent priory at Sele in Sussex. In about 1155, he also inherited through his mother's family one half of the honour of Barnstaple in Devon, paying a fee of 1,000 marks for the privilege. William became an internationally recognised figure. When Archbishop Theobald of Canterbury was asked by Pope Adrian IV to inquire into the background of a certain Walter, canon of St Ruf, his reply, dated 1154/9 read:

The facts which you demand need but little enquiry; for they shine so brightly in themselves that they cannot be hid; so great is the brilliance of his noble birth and the glory of all his kin. For Walter, as we know for a fact, was the son of a distinguished knight and born of a noble mother in lawful wedlock, and he is closely related by blood to the noble William de Braose.

William had married Bertha, daughter of Miles of Gloucester and Sibyl de Neufmarché, by 1150. When each of Bertha's four brothers (Walter de Hereford, Henry FitzMiles (or Henry de Hereford), Mahel de Hereford and William de Hereford) died leaving no issue, William's marriage became unexpectedly valuable. He gained control of the lordships of Brecon and Abergavenny after 1166 when the last brother died. These additional land holdings greatly expanded the territorial power and income of the Braose family. They now held a vast block of territory in the Welsh Marches as well as their extensive interests in Sussex and Devon. William's daughters were able to make good marriages, notably Sibyl to William de Ferrers, Earl of Derby. Maud was married to John de Brompton of Shropshire. William's son and heir, another William de Braose, became a major player in national politics under King John.

== Royal service ==
Empress Maud, the only legitimate living child of Henry I, landed in England in 1139 in an attempt to press her claim to the monarchy. She was soon besieged by King Stephen's forces at Arundel Castle. Stephen allowed Maud safe conduct to Bristol and provided her with an escort, which included William de Braose, suggesting that he was an adherent of King Stephen. William was present as a witness when three charters were issued by Stephen at Lewes dated to the years 1148–53, therefore, it appears that he remained loyal to the king until the Treaty of Wallingford ended the hostilities.

William was in Sussex in 1153, (Note: He confirmed a charter at Bramber.) but he followed Duke Henry, soon to become King Henry II, to Normandy in 1154. (Note: He is recorded as present when Henry issued a charter at Rouen.) William was frequently with the new king. He was one of the military leaders who supported Henry at Rhuddlan in 1157. He witnessed one of the king's charters at Romsey in 1158, and he is recorded at the king's court in Wiltshire in 1164 when the Constitutions of Clarendon were enacted. He accompanied the king on an expedition to France, witnessing at Leons (Note: Eyton suggests this is probably Lyons-la-Forêt) in 1161 and Chinon in 1162. William is also documented on the Irish campaign at Dublin in 1171 and Wexford in 1172. William's younger brother, Philip, also accompanied the king to Ireland, and remained with the garrison at Wexford. In 1177 Philip was granted the kingdom of Limerick by Henry but failed to take possession after the citizens set fire to the town.

When Henry was facing war with his sons in 1173, William was appointed as sheriff of Herefordshire at Easter. He maintained the king's interests in Herefordshire until 1175.

== Later life and death ==
King Henry withdrew his favour from the family after William's son organised the murder of Seisyll ap Dyfnwal and other Welsh princes at Abergavenny in 1176. There is little subsequent record of William in public life, and it is likely that he retired to his estates in Sussex. William died after 1179 and was succeeded by his son, William de Braose, 4th Lord of Bramber, who gained the favour of both King Richard I and King John and became a dominant force in the Welsh Marches during their reigns.
