= Bronllys Castle =

Grade I listed building in Powys, Wales

- Castell Bronllys (Welsh) (Note: Since 2024, Cadw, which guard and maintain the site, use the Welsh name only.)
- near Bronllys, Powys, Wales
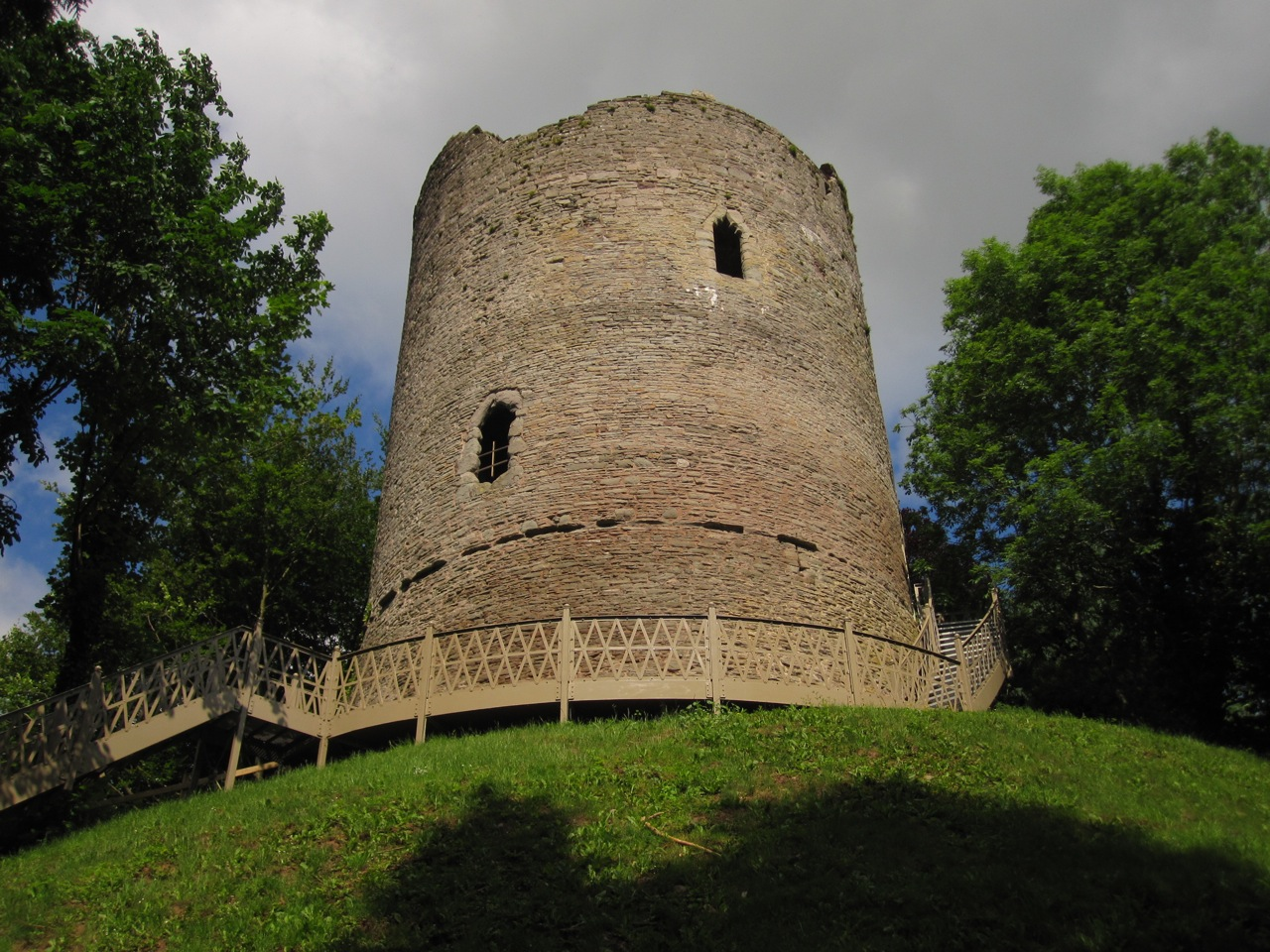
- Bronllys Castle

Site information
- Type: Castle
- Website: Castell Bronllys (Cadw)

Location
- Coordinates: 52°0′12.960″N 3°14′26.016″W

Site history
- Built: c. 1110
- Materials: Wood

Bronllys Castle (Welsh: Castell Bronllys) is a motte and bailey fortress standing south of Bronllys, towards Talgarth in Powys, Wales. The original castle, constructed of wood, was founded in or soon after 1100 by Richard Fitz Pons, the owner of the nearby Herefordshire barony of Clifford, who was a supporter of Bernard of Neufmarché.

== History ==
In 1144 Roger Fitzmiles, Earl of Hereford, detached the land surrounding Bronllys from the Lordship of Brecknock, and gave it to Richard's son, Walter de Clifford, who then rebuilt the castle in stone. Walter seems to have been responsible for building the round tower on the motte, as in 1165 it caught fire and a stone tumbling from the battlements killed Earl Roger's last surviving brother Mahel de Hereford; Gerald of Wales claims that, while dying from the injury, Mahel repented of his previous persecution of the Bishop of St Davids, which he blamed for his fate.

Roger and his brothers were childless, so Brecknock passed first to their sister's husband, Philip de Braose, then to Eleanor de Braose, and so came under the control of her husband, Humphrey de Bohun.

In September 1233 Walter's grandson, another Walter de Clifford, had a force of over 200 men defending the castle against his father-in-law Llywelyn ab Iorwerth. Walter had no son, only a daughter, Maud, who married John Giffard, and inherited the lands when Walter died in 1263. The land was divided between the two daughters of John and Maud, with Bronllys going to the youngest, Maud.

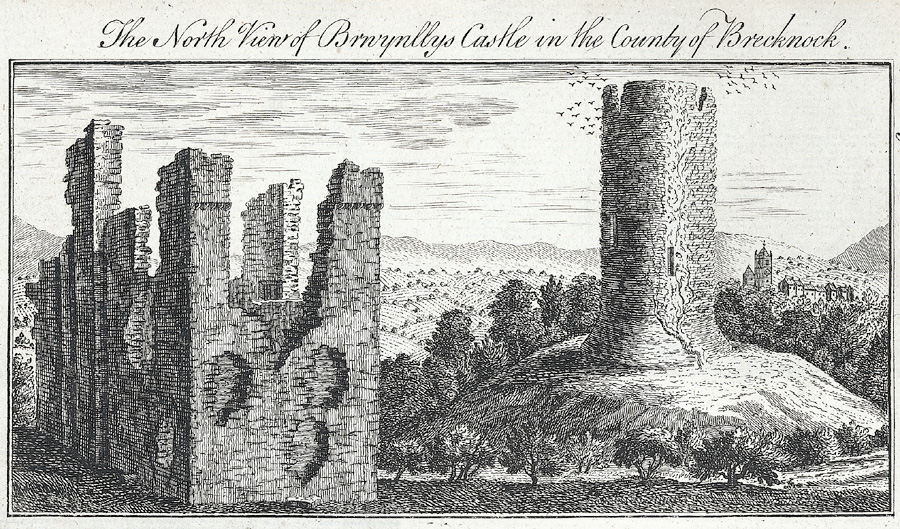
North view of Bronllys Castle in 1740

Maud (the daughter) died in 1311, and Edward II gave the castle to Rhys ap Hywel (a local resident descendant of the former kings of Brycheiniog) as reward for loyalty to the crown. Rhys rebelled against the machinations of Edward's favourite and the king took back Bronllys; after Rhys helped depose Edward, being a member of the search party who seized him, he regained Bronllys.

Bronllys was inherited by Rhys' son, Philip ap Rhys. Although Philip's brother, Einion Sais was a prominent military supporter of the new king, Edward III allowed himself to be persuaded by Humphrey de Bohun, Lord of Brecknock that a place like Bronllys should be ruled by a powerful magnate such as himself, rather than a weak one such as Philip, so Edward transferred the castle to Humphrey.

Bronllys was inherited by Humphrey's nephew, Humphrey de Bohun. This Humphrey only had daughters, so when he died in 1373, the land was initially retained by his widow. Humphrey's titles and authority went into abeyance, and were disputed between the Duke of Gloucester, married to the older daughter, Eleanor, and Henry Bolinbroke, married to Mary de Bohun. After deposing Richard II, Henry used his royal authority and terminated the abeyance in Mary's favour, effectively transferring the lands to himself by jure uxoris in 1399.

== Decline ==
Following the deposition and death of Richard II, the Glyndŵr Rising broke out in Wales. The castle was fortified against Owain Glyndŵr's forces, but Bronllys was never again occupied.

Anne of Gloucester, daughter of Mary de Bohun's elder sister Eleanor, petitioned Henry for her grandfather's lands to be returned to her. Anne's son, and heir, Humphrey Stafford, inherited the Earldom of Buckingham from his uncle, and was raised to Duke as a reward for his loyalty to Bolinbroke's heirs. His grandson, Edward Stafford, 3rd Duke of Buckingham, was suspected of plotting against King Henry VIII, and was subsequently executed for treason in 1521; Bronllys was forfeited to the crown, with which it has remained ever since.

In 1521, the year the castle became a crown property, the antiquarian John Leland went to inspect it, reporting that it had fallen into great disrepair. By 1583 the disrepair was substantially worse. In the 20th century Cadw, the arm of the Welsh Assembly charged with care of historic monuments, took over guardianship and maintenance of the castle which is open to the public. Ownership remains vested with the owners of the adjacent Bronllys Castle House. Last sold in 1986, in 2023 the estate was again marketed for sale.

Since 2024, Cadw have used the Welsh name Castell Bronllys in English, as part of an effort to standardise the names in both languages.

== See also ==
- List of Cadw properties
