= Earl of Hereford =

British noble title

Earl of Hereford is a title in the ancient feudal nobility of England, encompassing the region of Herefordshire, England. It was created six times.

== History ==
The title is an ancient one. In 1042, Godwin, Earl of Wessex severed the territory of Herefordshire and its Welsh dependencies from the Kingdom of Mercia. He immediately granted it to his eldest son Sweyn Godwinson. The earldom included the counties of Gloucestershire, Herefordshire, Oxfordshire, Berkshire and Somerset. In 1047, Sweyn attempted to take Eadgifu, Abbess of Leominster, from her nunnery by force with the intention of marrying her. However, the Archbishop of Canterbury and King Edward the Confessor intervened and stopped him. As punishment, King Edward banished Sweyn from England, to Flanders.

In 1049, Sweyn returned to England seeking forgiveness, supported by his cousin Beorn Estrithson. However, a disagreement arose and Sweyn murdered his cousin, resulting in his exile once more. He was deemed "a man of no honour". In 1050, Sweyn was pardoned for his crimes and had the earldom restored to him, despite his violent acts. In 1051, Sweyn was exiled again together with his father and brothers and forfeited the earldom.

In 1052, King Edward granted the earldom to Ralph the Timid. In 1055, Ælfgar, Earl of Mercia and Gruffydd ap Llywelyn invaded Herefordshire and Ralph met the Welsh army at Hereford. Fearing defeat, Ralph fled with the French and Norman soldiers, causing the surrounding area to fall under Welsh control. Between 1055 and 1057, Harold Godwinson retook the county with another force. Ralph died in 1057, leaving his young son Harold as heir. In 1066, William FitzOsbern supported the Norman conquest of England. As reward, he was granted the Isle of Wight. In 1067, William was also granted the earldom of Hereford, and took on roles as chief administrator of Northern England. He oversaw the building of numerous castles.

Between 1070 and 1071, William FitzOsbern was delegated to govern England while William the Conqueror was away for Normandy. The widowed Richilde, Countess of Hainaut, offered her hand in marriage to FitzOsbern for assistance against challenges to her power. However, FitzOsbern sought to gain control of the wealthy Flanders territory near Normandy. He rushed there with his army but was killed in the Battle of Cassel, leaving his son Roger de Breteuil as the new earl.

In 1075, Roger conspired with his brother-in-law Ralph Guader, Earl of Norfolk while the Conqueror was again absent in Normandy. They raised an army but were prevented from crossing the River Severn by local bishops and defeated at Fagadune. When the Conqueror returned, Roger was tried for treason before the Magnum Concilium and sentenced to perpetual imprisonment, while his soldiers had their right foot amputated. All his lands were also forfeited.

Roger died in prison in 1087, leaving two sons Reynold and Roger. Neither inherited the earldom, though they later fought successfully for King Henry I. After 1135, in the absence of an earl, King Stephen granted the earldom to Robert de Beaumont, Earl of Leicester and grandson of the previous earl, Roger. As part of this grant, Robert was instructed to use the city and castle of Hereford as another stronghold in the Midlands region. In 1141, the Empress Maud granted the earldom to Miles FitzWalter, hereditary High Sheriff of Gloucestershire, for his faithful service during her claim to the crown. He rebuilt Gloucester Castle, while Empress Maud lived at his expense in England. She granted him Abergavenny Castle as well in 1142.

In 1143, Miles FitzWalter demanded large sums from the Church while desperately short of money to pay his troops. The Bishop of Hereford resisted Miles' demands, so when Miles invaded church lands he was excommunicated. Miles died in a hunting accident at Christmas, leaving his son Roger FitzMiles as the new earl. Roger inherited his father's roles as High Sheriff of Gloucestershire, Castellan of Gloucester Castle, and Constable of England. He was troubled by his father's death as an excommunicate and continued pressing the Bishop, eventually receiving excommunication himself.

In 1151, the devout Roger founded the Abbey of Flaxley in Gloucester and supported other monasteries. However, in 1155 a dispute arose with King Henry II over Gloucester Castle, which Roger surrendered along with his earldom. King Henry regranted the earldom to Roger, who then took monastic vows at Gloucester Abbey.

Roger died without heirs, leaving his brother Walter of Hereford to inherit. But before Walter could assume his titles, he joined a rebellion against King Henry. As punishment, the king stripped Gloucester city and the earldom of Hereford from Walter's inheritance. Walter then died childless, followed by his brothers Henry and Mahel of Hereford in border conflicts and an accident respectively. With no male heirs, their estates passed to their three sisters: Margaret of Hereford, Bertha of Hereford and Lucy.

The eldest sister Margeret was married to Humphrey II de Bohun. In recognition of this marriage, King Henry granted Humphrey the earldom of Hereford. He also inherited two-thirds of the family estates and the prestigious hereditary office of Constable of England. Humphrey held the high position of Lord High Steward, above the Lord Chancellor.

Upon Humphrey's death in 1165, their son Humphrey III de Bohun succeeded him. Before 1172, he successfully claimed the title of Constable of England from the Gloucester family, consolidating his inherited powers. Between 1171 and 1175, Humphrey married Margaret of Huntingdon, widow of Conan IV, Duke of Brittany and granddaughter of King David I of Scotland.

Between 1181 and 1187, Humphrey accompanied King Henry, leading an army against the count of Flanders in support of King Philip II of France. However, he died abroad, leaving his son Henry de Bohun to inherit. In 1200, King John elevated Henry's status by conferring the now-extinct title of Earl of Hereford, in the Peerage of England, upon him at Porchester. However, the king retained the revenue and feudal control of the earldom. Henry was instead granted an annuity, and all future earls were peers rather than holding the feudal title.

== Earls of Hereford, First Creation (1043) ==
- Swegen Godwinson (1043–1051)

== Earls of Hereford, Second Creation (1052) ==
- Ralph the Timid, Earl of Hereford (1052–1057)

== Earls of Hereford, Third Creation (1058) ==
- Harold Godwinson, Earl of Hereford (later Harold II of England) (1058–1066)

== Earls of Hereford, Fourth Creation (1067) ==
- William FitzOsbern, 1st Earl of Hereford (1067–1071)
- Roger de Breteuil, 2nd Earl of Hereford (1071–1074)

== Earls of Hereford, Fifth Creation (1141) ==
- Miles de Gloucester, 1st Earl of Hereford (1141–1143)
- Roger Fitzmiles, 2nd Earl of Hereford (1143–1155)

== Earls of Hereford, Sixth Creation (1199) ==
Arms of Bohun, adopted c.1200: Azure, a bend argent cotised or between six lions rampant or

- Henry de Bohun, 1st Earl of Hereford (1199–1220)
- Humphrey de Bohun, 2nd Earl of Hereford (1220–1275)
- Humphrey de Bohun, 3rd Earl of Hereford (1275–1298)
- Humphrey de Bohun, 4th Earl of Hereford (1298–1322)
- John de Bohun, 5th Earl of Hereford (1322–1336)
- Humphrey de Bohun, 6th Earl of Hereford (1336–1361)
- Humphrey de Bohun, 7th Earl of Hereford (1361–1373)

Heiresses:

- Eleanor de Bohun (c. 1366 – 1399), who married Thomas of Woodstock; their great-great-great-grandson Walter Devereux was created Viscount Hereford in 1550
- Mary de Bohun (c. 1368 – 1394), who married Henry of Bolingbroke, the future King Henry IV of England; he was created Duke of Hereford in 1397

== See also ==
- Duke of Hereford
- Viscount Hereford
