= Haywood, Herefordshire =

Civil parish in Herefordshire, England

Coordinates: 52.02°N 2.75°W

Haywood is a civil parish in Herefordshire, England, and south-west of Hereford. Parish population at the 2011 census was 216. There are no substantial settlements, however, it is home to one of the largest poultry farms in Great Britain.

The Hay of Hereford was a Royal forest in the early Middle Ages. It was granted by Empress Matilda to Milo of Gloucester when she created him Earl of Hereford. The woodlands can be seen on Saxton's 1577 map of Herefordshire.

Haywood was officially outside of any parish in the mid-1800s.
