= Henry de Bohun, 1st Earl of Hereford =

Anglo-Norman nobleman

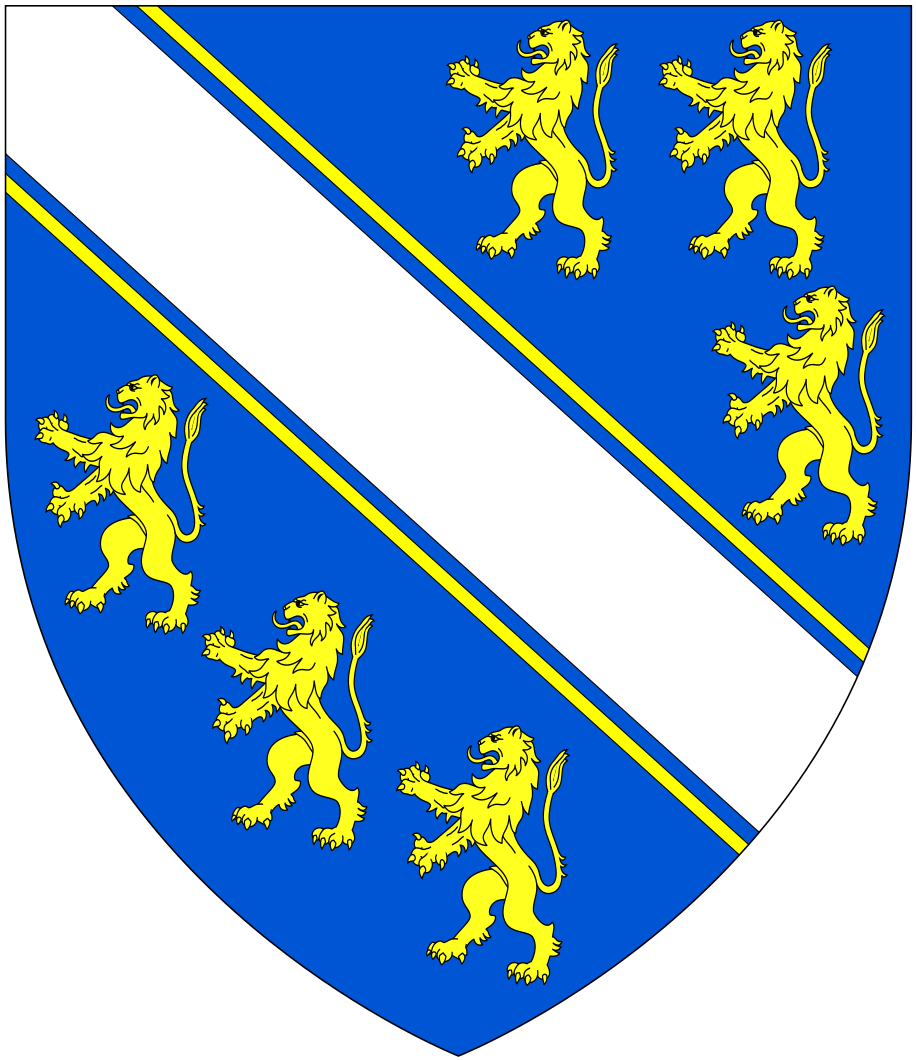
Arms of Bohun, adopted at start of age of heraldry (c.1200–1215): Azure, a bend argent cotised or between six lions rampant of the last

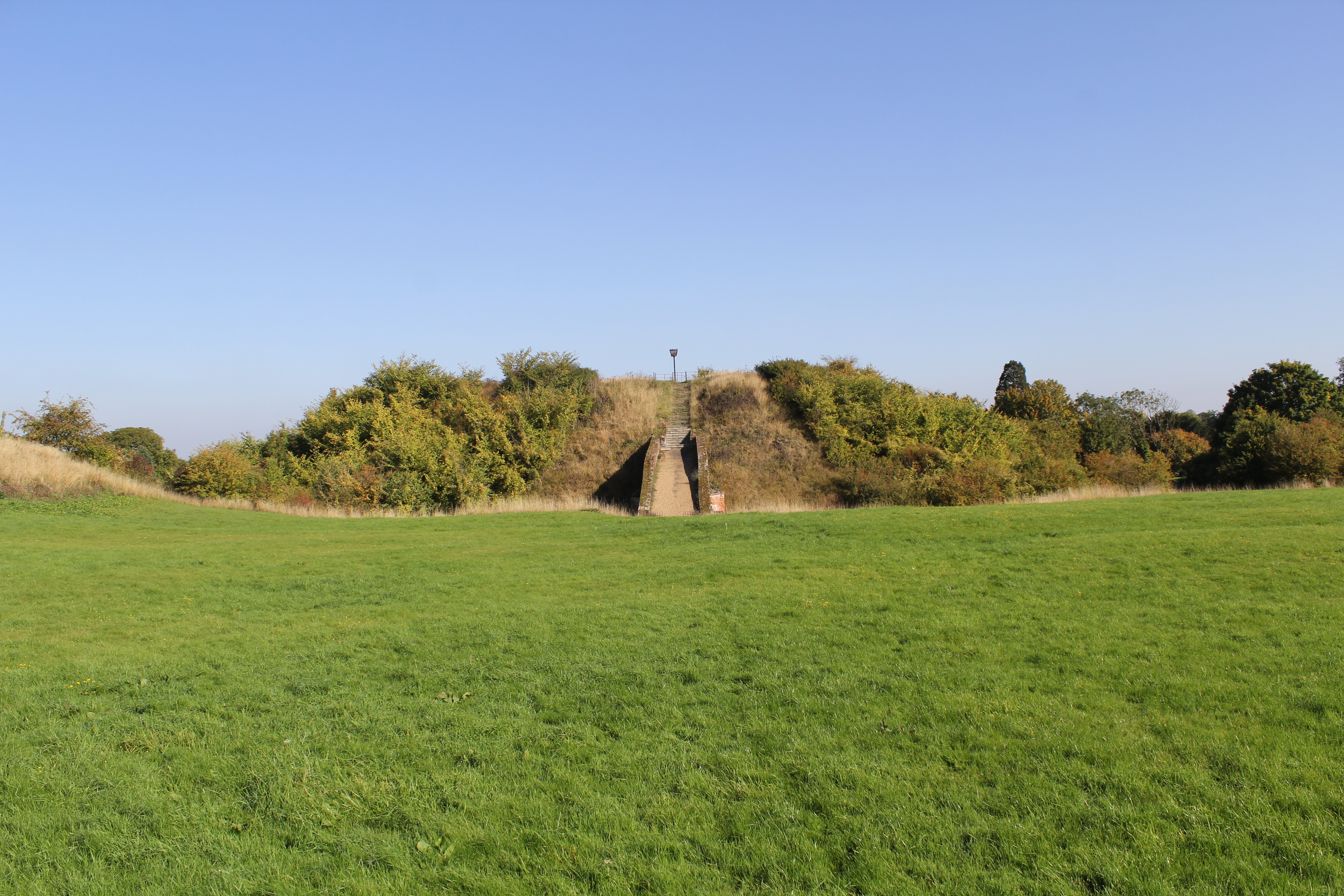
The motte and late-medieval brick bridge of Pleshey Castle in Essex, chief residence of Henry de Bohun

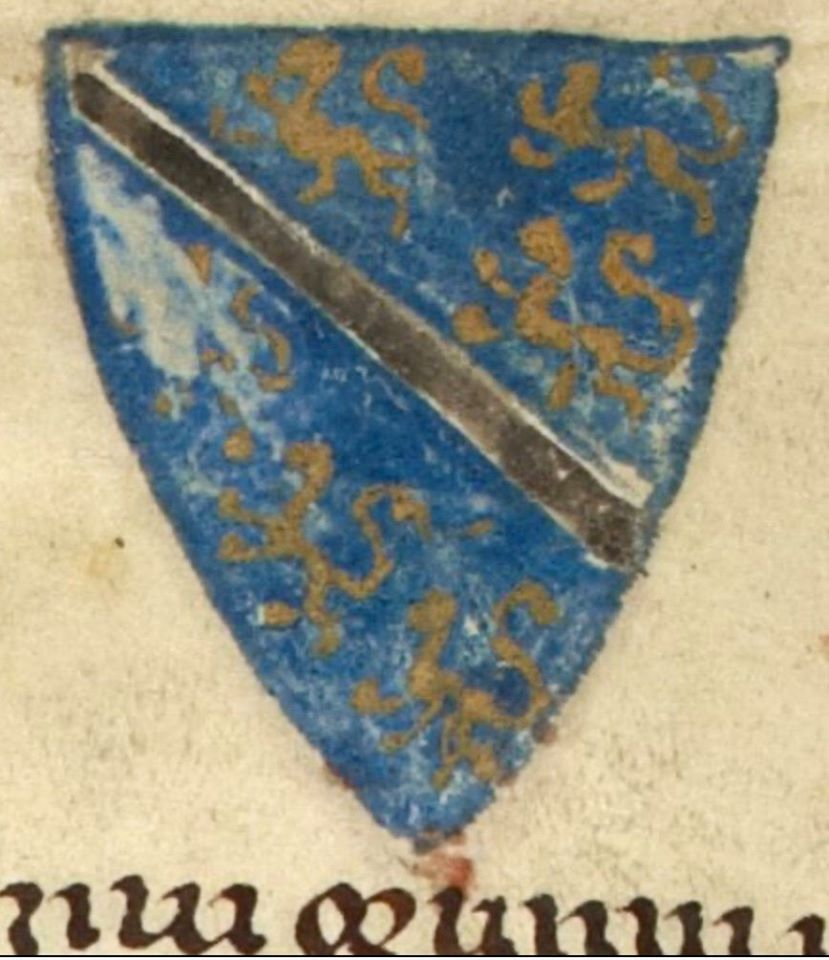
Arms of Bohun drawn by Matthew Paris (d.1259)

Henry de Bohun, 1st Earl of Hereford (1176 – 1 June 1220) of Pleshey Castle in Essex, was an Anglo-Norman nobleman who became Hereditary Constable of England from 1199.

== Origins ==
Henry was the son and heir of Humphrey III de Bohun and Margaret of Huntingdon, daughter of Henry of Scotland. His father was lord of Trowbridge Castle in Wiltshire and Caldicot Castle in south-east Wales, and was the 5th feudal baron of Trowbridge. His father served King Henry II as Lord High Constable of England. Henry had a half-sister, Constance, Duchess of Brittany.

== Earldom ==
Henry's paternal grandmother was Margaret of Hereford, a daughter of Miles FitzWalter of Gloucester, 1st Earl of Hereford, Lord of Brecknock (died 1143), Sheriff of Gloucester and Constable of England. After the male line of Miles of Gloucester failed, in 1200 King John created Henry de Bohun Earl of Hereford and Constable of England. His lands lay chiefly on the Welsh Marches, and from this date the Bohuns took a foremost place among the Marcher barons.

In 1212, Henry was in a legal dispute with William Longespée, 3rd Earl of Salisbury, over Trowbridge. With the dispute having dragged on, Henry attempted to cite illness as a justification for missing the hearing in June 1213. In response, Trowbridge was relinquished to the Crown. Henry was one of the twenty-five barons elected by their peers to enforce the terms of Magna Carta in 1215, and was subsequently excommunicated by the Pope.

In September 1215, Henry went with Saer de Quincy, Earl of Winchester and Robert Fitzwalter to France. In a meeting with Prince Louis, Henry, Saer, and Robert swore fealty to Louis and offered him the crown on the condition that he conquer England. In the civil war that followed Magna Carta, he was a supporter of King Louis VIII of France and was captured at the Battle of Lincoln in 1217.

== Marriage and issue ==
Henry married Maud de Mandeville, daughter and heiress of Geoffrey Fitz Peter, 1st Earl of Essex, of Pleshey Castle in Essex. The couple had the following children:

- Humphrey IV de Bohun, 2nd Earl of Hereford, 1st Earl of Essex (1204–1275), eldest son and heir, created Earl of Essex in 1239, who married Maud de Lusignan, by whom he had at least three children.
- Henry de Bohun, who died young.
- Ralph de Bohun.

== Death ==
Henry died in June 1220 while on crusade to the Holy Land.

== Sources ==
- Cokayne, G. (ed. by V. Gibbs). Complete Peerage of England, Scotland, Ireland, Great Britain and the United Kingdom. London:1887–1896, H-457-459
- Crouch, David (2011). The English Aristocracy, 1070–1272: A Social Transformation. Yale University Press.
- Hanley, Catherine (2016). Louis: The French Prince who invaded England. Yale University Press.
- Holt, J. C. (2015). Magna Carta. Cambridge University Press.
- Pollock, M. A. (2015). Scotland, England and France After the Loss of Normandy, 1204–1296. Boydell Press.
- Sanders, I. J. (1960). English Baronies: A Study of their Origin and Descent 1086–1327. Oxford University Press.

Honorary titles
Preceded by Humphrey III de Bohun	Lord High Constable; 1199–1220	Succeeded by Humphrey V de Bohun
Peerage of England
New creation	Earl of Hereford; 1199–1220	Succeeded by Humphrey V de Bohun
