= Winchcombe Castle =

Coordinates: 51°57′6″N 1°58′1″W

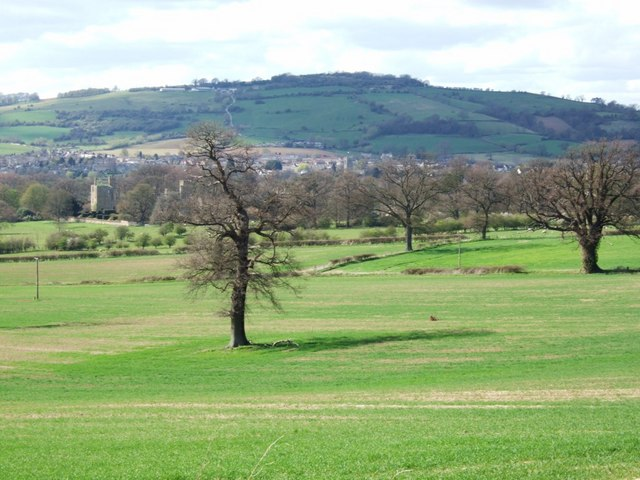

Winchcombe Castle was a castle in the town of Winchcombe in Gloucestershire, England.

The motte and bailey castle was built during the chaos of the Anarchy in the 12th century. The castle was built either in 1140 or 1144 in the north-east of Winchcombe, then a key region of the conflict, and rested on a high motte, or mound. The castle was built by Roger, Earl of Hereford, a supporter of the Empress Matilda, but was attacked in late 1144 by forces loyal to King Stephen in a direct assault. The castle was destroyed after the attack and was not rebuilt.

== See also ==
- Castles in Great Britain and Ireland
- List of castles in England

== Bibliography ==
- Walker, David. Gloucestershire Castles, in Transactions of the Bristol and Gloucestershire Archaeological Society, 1991, Vol. 109.
