= Miles of Gloucester, 1st Earl of Hereford =

12th-century Anglo-Norman nobleman and earl

Centres of the feudal barony of Miles of Gloucester

Miles FitzWalter of Gloucester, 1st Earl of Hereford (died 24 December 1143) (alias Miles of Gloucester) was a great magnate based in the west of England. He was hereditary Constable of England (Note: In some sources Miles's name is not translated from the Latin Milo) and Sheriff of Gloucestershire.

He inherited vast landholdings in Wales from his wife Sibyl de Neufmarché (whose father had conquered the independent kingdom of Brycheiniog (Brecknockshire, modern: Breconshire) in South Wales, which became the Lordship of Brecknock, and other lands in Gloucestershire from his father (the nucleus of which were the Domesday Book holdings of his great-uncle Durand of Gloucester) and acquired other large landholdings himself, including the extensive Lordship of Abergavennny in South Wales, and St Briavel's Castle and the Forest of Dean in the west of Gloucestershire. These combined lands became a feudal barony, now known as the "Barony of Miles of Gloucester".

By his three daughters and eventual co-heiresses his barony was split between the families of de Bohun, which inherited the fiefdom of Durand of Gloucester (Miles's great-uncle), the hereditary Constabulary of England and was re-created Earl of Hereford in 1200; de Braose, which inherited the Lordships of Brecon and Abergavenny; and FitzHerbert, which inherited Blaen Llyfni.

In 1136 he founded Llanthony Secunda Priory half a mile south of Gloucester Castle, in the chapter house of which he and many of his de Bohun descendants were buried. John of Salisbury classed him with Geoffrey de Mandeville, 1st Earl of Essex and others as non tam comites regni quam hostes publici ("not so much earls of the kingdom as public enemies"). The charge is justified by his public policy, but the materials for appraising his personal character do not exist.

== Origins ==
He was the son and heir of Walter of Gloucester (d. 1129), hereditary Sheriff of Gloucestershire in 1097 and in 1105–1106, and Castellan of Gloucester Castle. Walter was also seemingly Constable of England under King Henry I (1100–1135), as he is described in an annal of Llanthony Secunda Priory (transcribed by Dugdale) as Constabularius, princeps militiae domus regiae, vir magnus et potens et inter primos regni praecipue honoratus ("Constable, chief of the royal military household, a great and powerful man and amongst the first of the kingdom especially honoured"). Some sources, however, suggest that Walter was merely the Constable of Gloucester Castle. Walter's wife (and Miles's mother) was a certain Berta. Walter was in favour with King Henry I (1100–1135), three of whose charters to him are extant.

Walter's father was Roger de Pitres, Sheriff of Gloucestershire from about 1071, who at some time before 1083 was succeeded by his brother Durand of Gloucester (d. circa 1096), Sheriff of Gloucestershire at the time of the Domesday Book of 1086, who made Walter his heir.

== Career ==
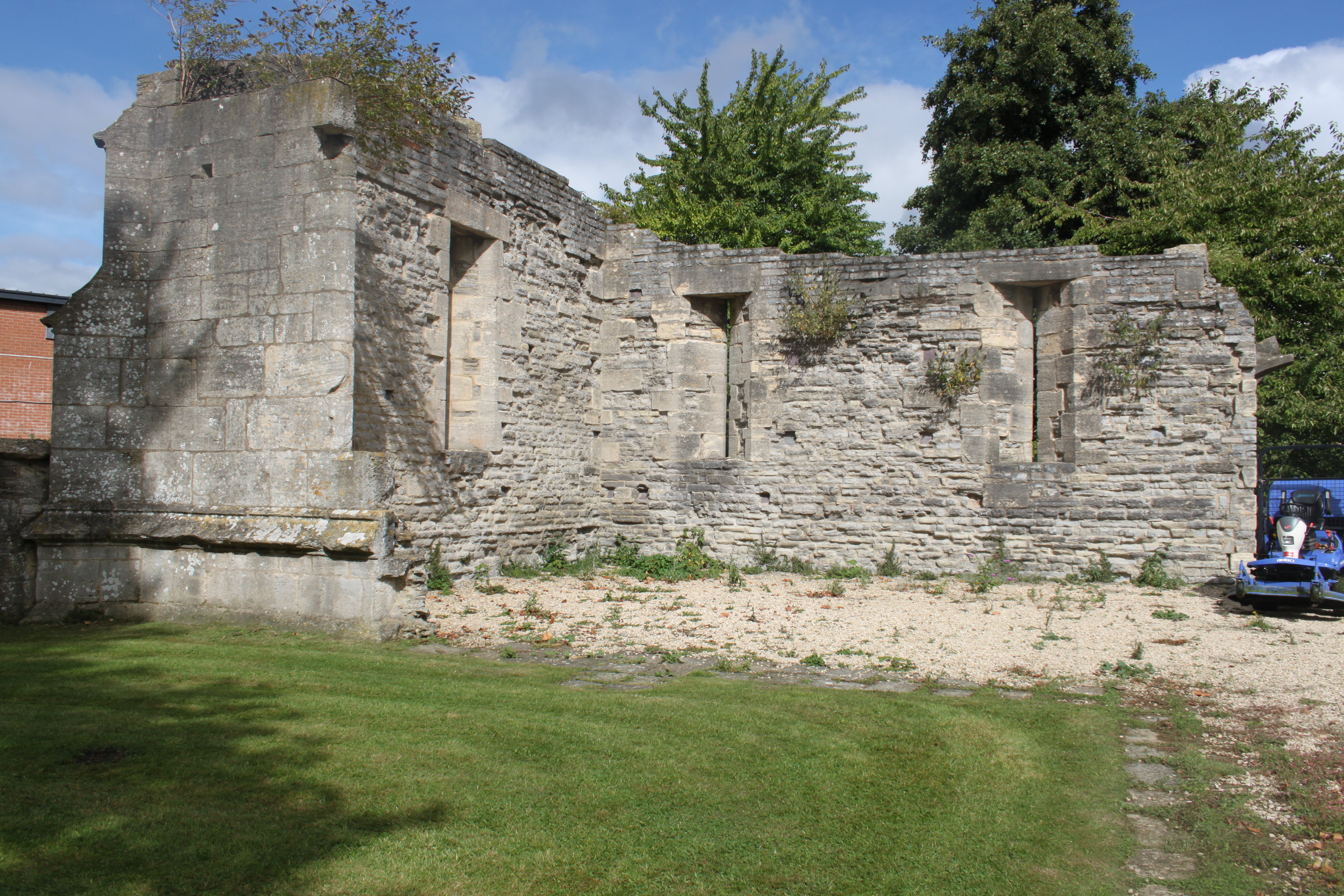
Llanthony Secunda Priory, remains of precinct wall north of Inner Gatehouse

Early in 1121 Miles married Sibyl de Neufmarché, daughter and heiress of Bernard de Neufmarché, the conqueror of Brycheiniog, which brought him her father's possessions (such as the new Lordship of Brecknock). In the Pipe Roll of 1130 Walter is found to have been succeeded by his son, having died in or around 1126.

Miles was (from 1128 at least) sheriff of Gloucestershire, a justice itinerant, and a justice of the forest, and by 1130 was sheriff of Staffordshire. He had also (though the fact has been doubted) been granted his father's office of constable by a special charter. In conjunction with Pain fitzJohn, sheriff of Herefordshire and Shropshire, he ruled the whole Welsh border "from the Severn to the sea".

On his accession, King Stephen set himself to secure the allegiance of these two lords-marchers, who at length, on receiving a safe conduct and obtaining all they asked for, did him homage. It was at Reading that they met the king early in 1136. (Note: "[This is known] from two charters there tested, one of which was printed by Madox (History of the Exchequer, p. 135), by which Stephen confirms to Miles, 'sicut baroni et justiciario meo', the shrievalty of Gloucestershire, the constableship of Gloucester Castle, and the 'honour' of Brecknock" (Round 1890, p. 438).) Miles is next found attending the Easter court at Westminster as one of the royal constables, and, shortly after, the Oxford council in the same capacity. He was then despatched to the aid of the widow of Richard fitz Gilbert de Clare, who was beleaguered in her castle by the Welsh and whom he rescued.

Meanwhile, Miles had married his son and heir, Roger, to Cecily, daughter of fitzJohn, who inherited the bulk of her father's possessions. In the same year 1136 Miles transferred the original house of Augustinian canons at Llanthony Priory, Monmouthshire to a site on the south side of Gloucester, which they named Llanthony Secunda.

Two years later (1138) Miles received, in his official capacity, Stephen at Gloucester in May. He has been said to have renounced his allegiance a few weeks later, but he was with Stephen in August (1138) at the siege of Shrewsbury, and his defection did not take place till 1139.

In February 1139 Stephen gave Gloucester Abbey to Miles's kinsman Gilbert Foliot at his request. In the summer of 1139, however, he joined his lord, Robert, Earl of Gloucester, in inviting Empress Matilda to England. On her arrival Miles met her at Bristol, welcomed her to Gloucester, recognised her as his rightful sovereign, and became thenceforth her ardent supporter. She at once gave him St. Briavels Castle and the Forest of Dean.

Miles's first achievement on behalf of Matilda was to relieve Brian Fitz Count who was blockaded in Wallingford Castle. In November (1139) he again advanced from Gloucester and attacked and burnt Worcester. He also captured the castles of Winchcombe, Cerne, and Hereford. Meanwhile, he was deprived by Stephen of his office of constable. He took part in the victory at Lincoln (2 February 1141), and on the consequent triumph of the empress, he accompanied her in her progress, and was one of her three chief followers on her entry (2 March) into Winchester. He was with her at Reading when she advanced on London, and on reaching St. Albans Matilda bestowed on him a house at Westminster. He was among those who fled with her from London shortly after, and it was on his advice, when they reached Gloucester, that she ventured back to Oxford. There, on 25 July 1141, she bestowed on him the town and castle of Hereford and made him earl of that shire, as well as the forests of the Hay of Hereford and Trinela in avowed consideration of his faithful service. With singular unanimity, hostile chroniclers testify to his devotion to her cause. He even boasted that she had lived at his expense throughout her stay in England.

As "Earl Miles", he now accompanied her to Winchester, and on the rout of her forces on 14 September 1141 he escaped to Gloucester, where he arrived "exhausted, alone, and with scarcely a rag to his back". Towards the end of the year he was in Bristol making a grant to Llanthony Priory in the presence of the Empress Matilda and Robert, Earl of Gloucester. In 1142 he is proved by charters to have been with the Empress at Oxford and to have received her permission to hold Abergavenny Castle of Brian Fitz Count. It is probably to the summer of this year that he made a formal deed of alliance with the Earl of Gloucester, and as a hostage, he gave the Earl his son Mahel.

In 1143 Miles's pressing want of money to pay his troops led him to demand large sums from the church lands. Robert de Bethune, Bishop of Hereford, withstood his demands, and, on the Earl invading his lands, excommunicated him and his followers, and laid the diocese under interdict. The Earl's kinsman, Gilbert Foliot (Abbot of Gloucester), appealed to the legate on his behalf against the bishop's severity.

== Death and burial ==
On Christmas-eve of 1143 he was slain while hunting by a stray arrow shot at a deer. A dispute at once arose for possession of his body between the canons of Llanthony Secunda, his own foundation, and the monks of Gloucester. The case was heard before the bishops of Worcester, Hereford, and St. David's, and was terminated by a compromise on 28 December. The Earl was then buried in the chapter house at Llanthony.

== Succession ==
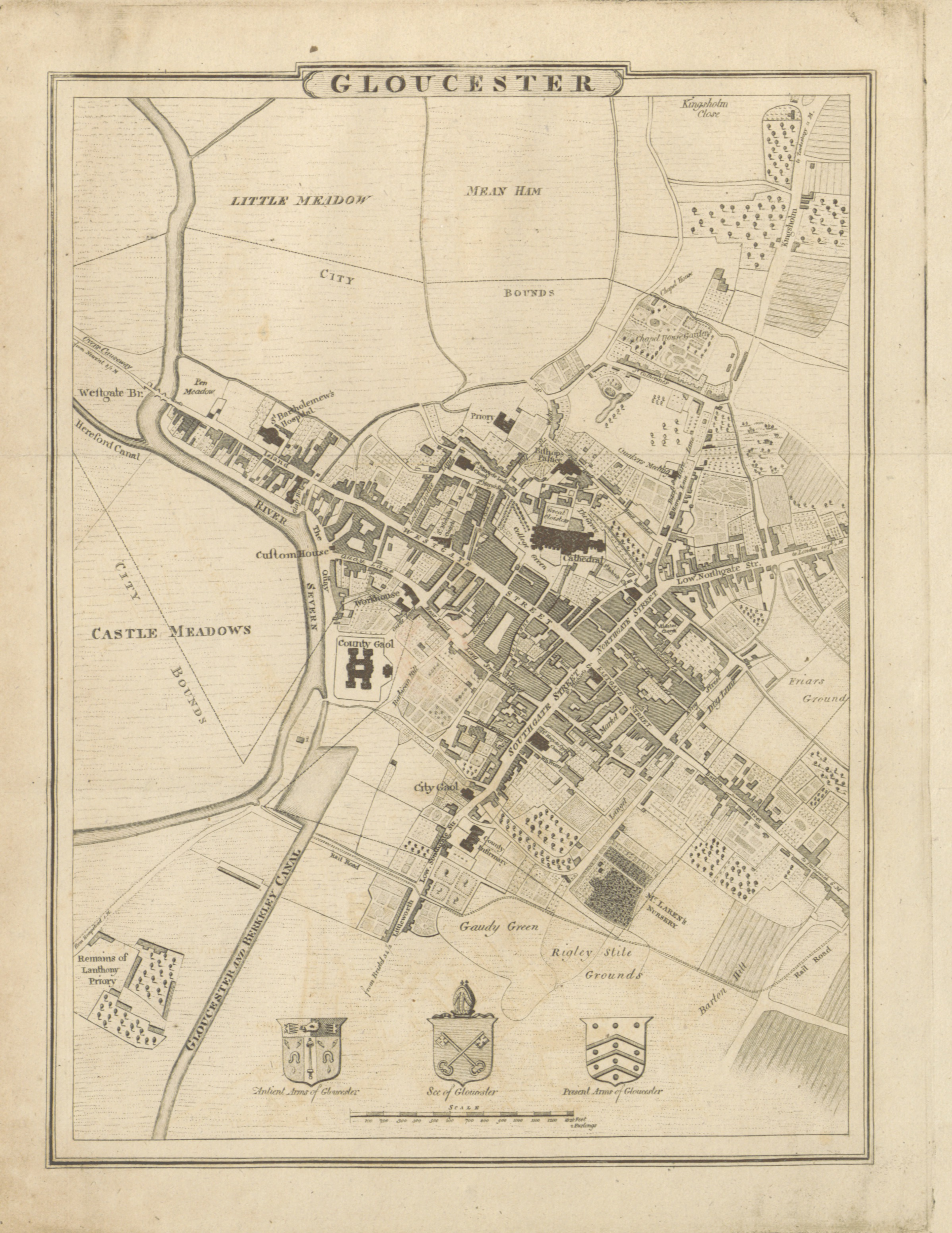
In the 1815 map of Gloucester, the County Gaol occupies the site of Gloucester Castle, residence of Miles of Gloucester as royal constable, demolished in 1787. At bottom left, half a mile away are the remains of Llanthony Secunda Priory, founded by Miles of Gloucester and his burial place.

Miles was succeeded by his eldest son and heir, Roger Fitzmiles, 2nd Earl of Hereford, who died without an heir twelve years later in 1155, when the Earldom of Hereford became extinct. The shrievalty of Hereford and Gloucester passed to his younger brother Walter de Hereford. On the death of the latter and two other brothers with no children the family possessions passed to their sisters and their descendants, namely Bertha of Hereford who through her marriage brought Abergavenny to William de Braose, 3rd Lord of Bramber, and Margaret of Hereford, the eldest sister, taking the bulk (Liber Niger) to Humphrey II de Bohun, later (1199) Earls of Hereford, and Constables of England, in recognition of their descent from Miles.

== Marriage and children ==
In 1121 he married Sibyl de Neufmarché, daughter and heiress of Bernard de Neufmarché (d.1125), Lord of Brecon, and Agnes or Nest, daughter of Osbern fitzRichard by his wife Nest, a daughter of Gruffydd ap Llywelyn, King of Wales. By Sibyl he had issue including:

=== Sons ===
- Roger Fitzmiles, 2nd Earl of Hereford (d.1155), eldest son and heir, hereditary Sheriff of Gloucestershire;
- Walter de Hereford (d.post-1159) heir to his elder brother Roger. He was hereditary Sheriff of Gloucestershire 1155–1157 and Sheriff of Herefordshire 1155–1159. He died after 1159 in the Holy Land.
- Henry of Hereford (d. 12 April 1165), who succeeded to the Lordship of Abergavenny in 1141/42.
- William de Hereford. He died before 1160 childless.
- Mahel de Hereford (d. October 1165), 4th son, who died at Bronllys Castle, Breconshire, Wales, mortally injured by a stone toppled from a tower during a fire. He died childless and was buried at Llanthony Secunda Priory.

=== Daughters and eventual co-heiresses ===
- Margaret of Hereford, co-heiress of the last of her brothers, whose 1/3rd moiety share of her fraternal inheritance of the barony of Miles of Gloucester appears to have comprised the fiefdom of Durand of Gloucester (Miles's great-uncle), namely 14 1/2 knights-fees centred on Haresfield in Gloucestershire. She also inherited the patronage of Llanthony Secunda Priory, her father's foundation where many of her Bohun descendants were buried. She married Humphrey II de Bohun, 4th feudal baron of Trowbridge in Wiltshire, by whom her grandson was Henry de Bohun, 1st Earl of Hereford (1176–1220), who in 1199 (following the extinction of the male line of Miles of Gloucester) was created by King John Earl of Hereford and Constable of England.
- Bertha of Hereford, co-heiress of the last of her brothers, whose share of her fraternal inheritance was the Lordships of Brecon and Abergavenny. At some time before 1150 married William de Braose, feudal baron of Bramber in Sussex, by whom she had issue.
- Lucy of Gloucester, co-heiress of the last of her brothers, whose share of her fraternal inheritance was Blaen Llyfni and the Forest of Dean. Addressed as Lady of Blaen Llyfni and Bwlch y Dinas, co. Brecknock, she married Herbert FitzHerbert, son of Herbert Fitzherbert, the Lord Chamberlain to Henry I, and grandson of Herbert FitzHerbert of Winchester, by whom she had issue: Pier FitzHerbert, Baron of Barnstable, Devonshire, Matthew Fitzherbert, Isabel Fitzherbert, Mary Fitzherbert, Petronilla Fitzherbert and Reginald Fitzherbert.

== Notes ==
Peerage of England
New creation	Earl of Hereford; 1141–1143	Succeeded by Roger Fitzmiles
