= Gilbert fitz Turold =

Anglo-Norman landowner of the eleventh century

Gilbert fitz Turold (Thorold) was an Anglo-Norman landowner of the eleventh century, mentioned in the Domesday Book of 1086, with widely spread holdings in six counties. He was an important figure in Herefordshire; but lost land and position, seemingly after his involvement in the rebellion of 1088 against William Rufus.

He held Hadzor in Worcestershire, probably given to him by William fitz Osbern; also land at Powick in the same county, at Doddenham, and at Strensham. Walelege was a fortified place on the Welsh border also given to him by William fitz Osbern; this is apparently the same as Ailey, mentioned in the same terms.
