= Bernard de Neufmarché =

11th-century Norman nobleman in England

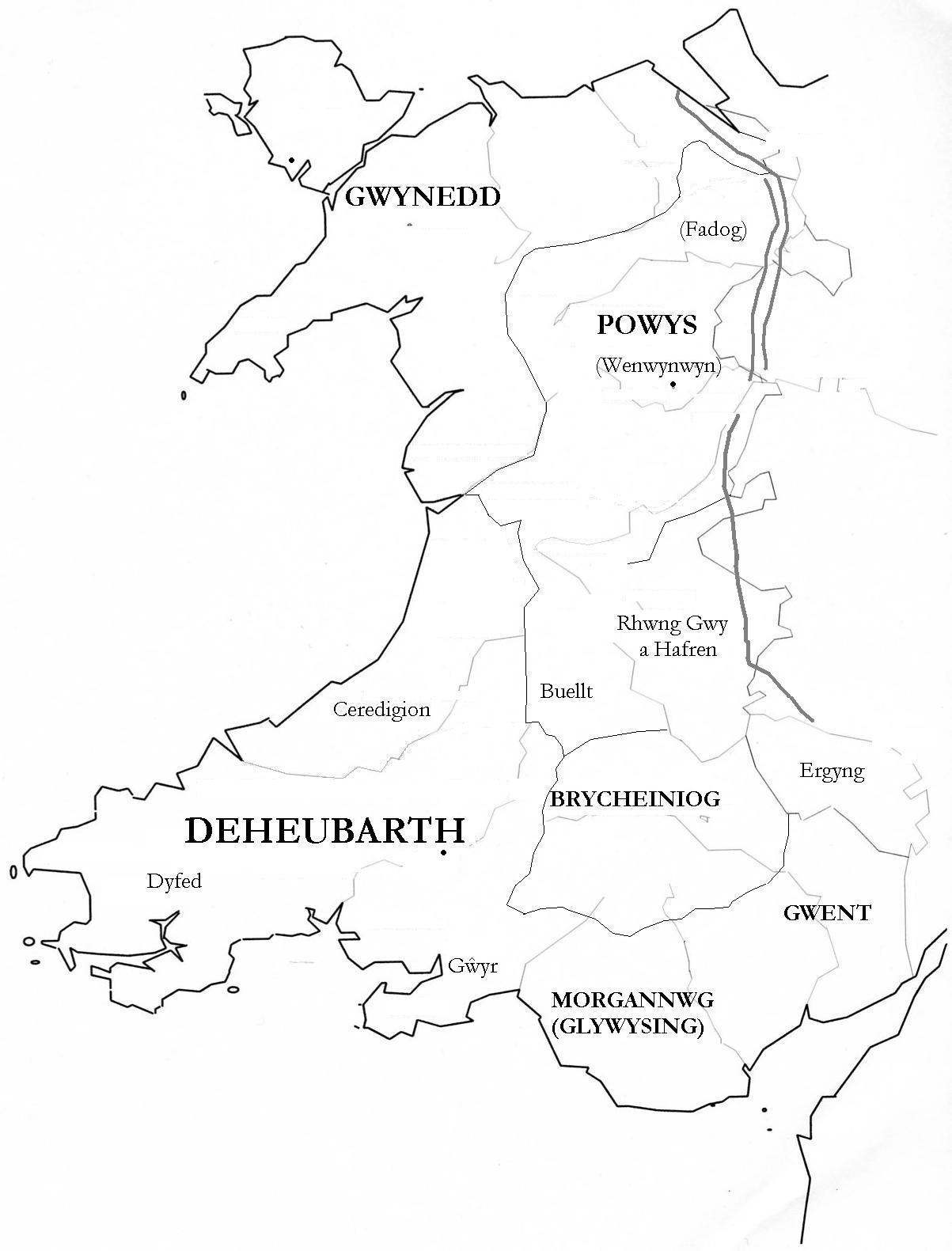
Map of the kingdoms of Wales around the time of Hastings.

Bernard de Neufmarché (c. 1050 – c. 1125), also Bernard of Newmarket or Bernard of Newmarch was the first of the Norman conquerors of Wales. He was a minor Norman lord who rose to power in the Welsh Marches before successfully undertaking the invasion and conquest of the Kingdom of Brycheiniog between 1088 and 1095. Out of the ruins of the Welsh kingdom he created the Anglo-Norman lordship of Brecon.

His toponymic byname comes from Neuf-Marché in Normandy. It was Latinised as de Novo Mercato (literally: "from the new market"), and has sometimes been Anglicised as "Newmarket" or "Newmarch".

== Coming to England ==
Because Bernard's family had attachments to the monastery of Saint-Evroul-sur-Ouche, the monkish chronicler Orderic Vitalis of that foundation had special knowledge of him and his family, though this still does not reduce the general obscurity of his origins or his life when compared to the richer Marcher Lords, like the great Roger of Montgomery. Bernard was the son of the minor Norman baron Geoffrey de Neufmarché and Ada de Hugleville, and he was born at the castle of Le-Neuf-Marché-en-Lions on the frontier between Normandy and Beauvais. His ancestors on his mother's side had founded the town of Auffay south of Dieppe on the Scie, while his paternal grandfather, Turquetil (Turchetil d'Harcourt), had served the young William II of Normandy as a guardian and was killed in that capacity. On his mother's side he also descended from the dukes of Normandy.

The question of Bernard's participation in the Battle of Hastings and therefore in the Norman Invasion is subject to debate. While Bernard had close family connections to the port of Saint-Valery-sur-Somme from which William's invading fleet launched, Bernard himself was not the ruler of that city and need not have been in the fleet. He had later connections with Battle Abbey: he established a cell of that abbey in Brecon, but that may have been an analogous foundation intended to mark his conquest of Brycheiniog. Bernard's peculiar absence from the Domesday Book of 1086 more or less damns the case for his presence at Hastings, for it is impossible that a noble participant in the victorious battle should not have received land to be recorded in Domesday if he was still living in 1087.

== Rise to power ==
Bernard was finally rewarded by the king, then William II of Normandy, in 1086 or 1087. He received lands in Herefordshire and lands which had devolved to the crown with the deaths of Gilbert fitz Thorold and Alfred of Marlborough. Gilbert's lands were concentrated in Herefordshire and included the manors of Bach, Middlewood and Harewood in the Golden Valley and the castles of Dorstone, Snodhill and Urishay connecting Clifford Castle to Ewyas Harold, which belonged to Alfred's lordship. Among Bernard's acquisitions from Gilbert was the domus defensabilis of Eardisley. From Alfred he received Pembridge, Burghill and Brinsop. Of these Snodhill was not founded until the twelfth century and then became the caput of the honour of Chandos. Bernard was also established in Speen and Newbury in Berkshire and Brinsop and Burghill in Herefordshire sometime before 1079. Both these latter vills were held from his honour of Brecon in the twelfth century. Bernard's omission from Domesday is especially peculiar there. It is possible that he had some kind of exemption.

Probably as a consequence of his rapid rise in the marches, Bernard attracted the attention of Osbern fitzRichard, who gave him his daughter, Agnes (Nest), whose mother was the Welsh princess Nest, daughter of Gruffydd ap Llywelyn and Edith of Mercia, in marriage sometime before 1099. She brought with her a dowry of Berrington and Little Hereford.

All of Bernard's estates lay in the valley of the River Wye and along an old Roman road which led from Watling Street to Y Gaer and on into Brycheiniog. The military possibilities of that road could only have encouraged his subsequent ventures into Wales.

== Conquest of Brycheiniog ==
Bernard joined the rebellion of the marcher lords against William Rufus at Lent in 1088. Bernard escaped without recorded punishment and the king probably conceded the marcher lords the right to expand their lands by conquest at the expense of the Welsh buffer kingdoms of Brycheiniog, Morgannwg and Gwynllwg. Shortly after the settlement with the king, Bernard spearheaded an invasion of Brycheiniog which was to lead eventually to its conquest. Before the end of the year, though, he had captured Glasbury, for he issued a charter for lands near that place to the abbey of Saint Peter's at Gloucester (autumn 1088).

The chronology of events at this juncture is often confused. Bernard may well have already been in power in Brycheiniog by 1088 if he had already inherited a claim to it after the defeat of Roger de Breteuil, Earl of Hereford, in 1075. In 1088 the king, William Rufus, confirmed a previous charter of Bernard's stating that he had already made an exchange "within his lordship of Brycheiniog" at Glasbury. He also already held Castell Dinas which had probably been built by the Earl of Hereford before 1075.

After the initial conquest of 1088, Bernard continued warring with Brycheiniog until 1090, probably supported by Richard Fitz Pons, the lord of Clifford. Talgarth was captured early and a castle was constructed at Bronllys where the rivers Dulais and Llynfi meet, a site probably central to the llys of the tywysog of the commote of Bronllys. By 1091 Bernard had reached the valley of the Usk, which was at the centre of the kingdom which was to become his own principality.

There is some discrepancy in this description of events also. Richard Fitz Pons was lord of Llandovery, which he had reached probably through Glamorgan, already by 1088. Bronllys Castle may not have been built until 1144, when Roger Fitzmiles, Earl of Hereford, is first recorded granting it as a five-knight's-fee mesne barony to Walter de Clifford, son of Richard Fitz Pons.

According to much later accounts and reconstructions, of dubious accuracy but which contain some references to verifiable history, the king of Brycheiniog, Bleddyn ap Maenarch, allied with the king of Deheubarth, Rhys ap Tewdwr, in 1093 (or perhaps 1094) and tried to attack the forces of Bernard which were building a castle at Brecon on the Usk and Honddu in the centre of a great plain in his kingdom where several Roman viae met. Bleddyn led a charge up the hill, but the Normans defeated the Welsh and Rhys was killed in battle. Brecknock Priory, which was later founded at the site of the battle, may have been built on the spot where Rhys supposedly fell. Bleddyn died not long after and Bernard was able to advance over the whole of Brycheiniog. Battle Of Brecon

Reliable historical records refer to no king of Brycheiniog after a Tewdwr ab Elise who died after 934. Certainly there is no contemporary reference to a Bleddyn ap Maenarch. The Welsh Bruts simply state that "Rhys ap Tewdwr, king of Deheubarth, was slain by the Frenchmen who were inhabiting Brycheiniog." This passage lends evidence to the belief that the conquest of Brycheiniog was mostly finished by Eastertide 1093 and that the main effect of the battle of Brecon was to open the way to the conquest of Deheubarth.

== Pacification and administration of Brycheiniog ==
He followed the Usk down to Ystradyw and took it, which incited the bishops of Llandaff to protest because the annexation of Ystradyw removed it from their diocese and brought it into the lordship of Brecon, which was under the episcopal authority of Saint David's. In Spring 1094, the southern Welsh rose in revolt against the Normans that had come to dominate them. Brycheiniog was unaffected and the Normans of that region launched a counterattack from Ystrad Tywy and Cantref Bychan which devastated Kidwelly and Gower but did not put down the revolt. In 1095 it spread to Brycheiniog and the Welsh of the countryside, allied with their compatriots of Gwynllwg and Gwent took back control of the province while the Normans were forced into their fortified centres.

Two expeditions from Glamorgan came to the rescue of the garrisons of Brycheiniog. The first was crushed in battle at Celli Carnant, but the second defeated the rebels at Aber Llech. What followed was the complete encastellation of Brycheiniog. Among the castles possibly built during Bernard's lordship to defend the entrances to Brycheiniog from the southeast were Tretower, Blaen Llyfni (not attested before 1207–1215), and Crickhowell.

Bernard also extensively enfeoffed his followers with Welsh land. Richard Fitz Pons may have been enfeoffed at Cantref Selyff on the western border of Brycheiniog and immediately he began in miniature the process whereby Bernard had come to rule Brycheiniog. However, Richard's son Walter is the first recorded landholder at Cantref Selyff. Furthermore, Bernard enfeoffed the sons of the king he had displaced in the less habitable land, thereby creating a loyal Welsh aristocracy and extracting more out of his land than the Normans otherwise knew how to do. The Normans lived predominantly in the valleys and lowlands in an agrarian society while the Welsh kept to the hills and mountains living pastorally, thus creating an overall economic gain. Among Bleddyn's sons, Gwrgan received Blaen Llyfni and Aberllyfni while Caradog received an unnamed hill country, and Drymbenog, Bleddyn's brother, was given land neighbouring that of Richard Fitz Pons.

== Death and succession ==
Bernard died around 1125 and was buried at Gloucester Abbey. By then he had established a flourishing borough around his castle of Brecon. Henry I had married Bernard's daughter Sibyl to Miles Fitz Walter, the High Sheriff of Gloucestershire, in 1121 and passed a significant portion of Bernard's honour to him as a dowry, including Hay-on-Wye Castle. According to Giraldus Cambrensis this was because Mahel de Neufmarché, the son and heir of Bernard, had mutilated the paramour of his mother. In vengeance his mother, Nesta, swore to King Henry I that her son was illegitimate. Henry was therefore able by law and custom to pass over Mahel and give the land to his friend and confidant Miles Fitz Walter with Bernard's legal heiress in marriage.
