= Walter de Clifford (died 1190) =

Anglo-Norman marcher lord

Walter de Clifford (1113–1190) (known before the 1130s as Walter FitzRichard) was an Anglo-Norman Marcher Lord of Bronllys Castle on the Welsh border, and was feudal baron of Clifford, seated at Clifford Castle in Herefordshire.

== Life ==
According to Eyton, he succeeded to the estates of his uncles Walter and Drogo. These two brothers figure in the Domesday Book of 1086 as the possessors of lands in Herefordshire, Berkshire, and other counties. His father Richard seems to have died between 1115 and 1138, in which latter year we find 'Walter de Cliffort' signing a Gloucester charter. He reappears under the same name in 1155.

He probably obtained the barony of Clifford from his wife Margaret, asserted to be the daughter of Raoul IV de Conches and thus the granddaughter of Raoul II of Tosny, feudal lord of Flamstead, who is shown, in 1086, as 'tenant-in-chief' of this fee, the multiple lords being listed as Drogo (son of Poyntz); Gilbert (son of Turold); Herbert; and Roger. (A second listing for Clifford in Domesday shows Roger de Lacy, as lord and tenant-in-chief, of a small portion of this barony, being taxed on 4 carucates.)

According to another theory, his mother Maud, wife of Richard FitzPonce, was the original holder of it. Towards the middle of Henry II's reign, he was possessed of the manors of Corfham, Culmington, in Shropshire. He was a benefactor to several monasteries, e.g. Haughmond Abbey, Dore, and Godstow.

Clifford's name occurs in the Welsh annals as lord of Llandovery Castle. He ravaged the lands of Rhys ap Gruffydd, who, finding his complaints to Henry II disregarded, surprised his castle (1157-9).

In 1163, he is said to have slain Einion ab Anarawd, son of Anarawd ap Gruffydd. In 1164, he is said to have slain Cadwgan, son of Maredudd. He was still living in 1187, and according to Eyton died in 1190.

== Family ==
He was the son of Richard FitzPons and Matilda, who was the sister of Miles de Gloucester, 1st Earl of Hereford, and daughter of Walter de Gloucester .

He married Margaret de Toeni, daughter of Ralph de Toeni, having children by her:

- Walter de Clifford (c. 1160 – 17 January 1221)
- Gilbert
- Richard
- Amicia, married Osbern fitz Hugh of Richards Castle
- Lucia, married Hugh de Say of Clun Castle
- Rosamund Clifford, known as "the fair Rosamund", the mistress of King Henry II.

The main part of the Clifford estates passed to Matilda, a great-granddaughter, wife of Sir William Longespée (grandson of William Longespée, 3rd Earl of Salisbury), whose daughter, Margery Longespée, brought them to her husband, Henry de Lacy, 3rd Earl of Lincoln. Walter de Clifford's grandson Roger (died 1231) was father of Roger (died 1285?).

== Notes ==
Attribution

This article incorporates text from a publication now in the public domain: Archer, Thomas Andrew (1887). "Clifford, Walter de". In Stephen, Leslie (ed.). Dictionary of National Biography. Vol. 11. London: Smith, Elder & Co. pp. 81–82.
