= Roger FitzMiles, 2nd Earl of Hereford =

12th-century English nobleman

Roger Fitzmiles, 2nd Earl of Hereford, (before 1125 – 1155) was an English noble who played an active and influential part in the wars between Empress Matilda and King Stephen (a civil war known as the Anarchy).

== Biography ==
Roger was the son of Miles de Gloucester, 1st Earl of Hereford and Sibyl, daughter of Bernard de Neufmarché, the heiress of Brecon.

In 1136, Roger married Cecilia, daughter of lord Pain fitzJohn of Ludlow Castle, and niece of lord Eustace fitz John, governor of Bamburgh Castle and Alnwick Castle. In December of the next year King Stephen confirmed Cecilia's inheritance of all her father's lands. During the Anarchy Roger acted as an auxiliary to his father's activities, and his consent and support was written into a treaty (1143) between his father and Robert, Earl of Gloucester.

Roger succeeded his father after Miles died in a hunting accident on 24 December 1143 while under excommunication by the church in an edict issued by the Bishop of Hereford. Roger, who bore hatred to the church for his father's excommunication, and compelled the prior of Llanthony, as a friend of the Bishop of Hereford, to resign. He even troubled his kinsman, Gilbert Foliot, on his becoming Bishop of Hereford, and was by him, after three warnings, formally excommunicated. Subsequently, however, he founded Flaxley Abbey, a Cistercian house, within the Forest of Dean, possibly on the spot of his father's death. (Note: "The Gloucester Cartulary also shows him as confirming the gifts of his predecessor" (Round 1890, p. 439).)

In the early part of 1144 Roger was at Devizes with Empress Matilda, and he is again found there with her son in 1149, with whom he marched northwards to Carlisle. (Note: "Another duchy deed (Box A) records his formal alliance with William Earl of Gloucester" (Round 1890, p. 440).)

Initially, Roger was dominated by Robert, Earl of Gloucester, but gradually the balance of power shifted and when Robert died, Roger became the leader of the Angevin party in England, a point recognised by the terms of a new treaty (1147) between himself and William Fitz Robert (son of Robert) and the 2nd Earl of Gloucester.

On the accession of Henry (1154) he resisted his authority, but was persuaded around March 1155 by the Bishop of Hereford to surrender his castles, and thereupon received a charter confirming him in almost all his father's possessions. He was with the king at Bridgnorth in July, and at Salisbury soon after.

Roger died without issue in the same year (1155). The Earldom of Hereford became extinct, but the shrievalty of Hereford and Gloucester passed to his brother Walter. On the death of the latter and two other brothers without issue the family possessions passed to their sisters, Bertha through her marriage bringing Abergavenny to Braose, but Margaret, the eldest sister, taking the bulk to the Bohuns afterwards (1199), in recognition of their descent from Miles, earl of Hereford, and constable of England.

== Assessment ==
David Crouch who wrote Roger's biography in the Oxford Dictionary of National Biography stated "Earl Roger's achievements were transitory, but there is no doubting his central position in English history between 1147 and 1155".

== Family ==
Roger married Cecily Fitz John, the daughter of Pain fitzJohn in January 1138, who inherited the bulk of her father's possessions. She remained Countess of Hereford in right of her dower until 1199. She died after 1204.

The earldom of Hereford remained in abeyance from the death of Roger until 28 April 1199 when King John of England recreated it for Henry de Bohun, the grandson of Earl Roger's sister Margaret.

== Citations ==
Peerage of England
Preceded by Miles de Gloucester	Earl of Hereford; 1143–1155	Succeeded by Cecily Fitz John
