= Richard Scrob =

11th century landholder in England

Sheriff of Worcestershire
- In office ?c. 1055 – ?1066

Personal details
- Born: before 1051; France
- Died: before 1086
- Spouse: daughter of Robert the Deacon
- Children: Osbern fitzRichard, William

Richard Scrob (sometimes fitzScrob or FitzScrob; fl. 1051-1066) was a Frenchman who came to England prior to the Norman Conquest of England.

Richard may have been a Norman, but it is not certain that he was. "Scrob" was not a patronymic, but rather an alternative name that was mistaken by the medieval chronicler John of Worcester as a patronymic. Thus Richard is often known as "Richard fitzScrob" or the alternative spellings.

Richard arrived in England during the reign of Edward the Confessor, probably early in the reign, as he was not expelled from England in 1052 along with many of other non-English landholders when Godwin of Wessex returned to power. He built Richard's Castle before 1051.

Richard possibly held the office of Sheriff of Worcester during Edward's reign. It is, however, certain that he was trusted by Edward with royal business in his locality. He was also named as housecarl of the king. Richard's main holdings were at Auretone in Herefordshire. He built an earthwork castle there, Richard's Castle, which is one of the few castles that predate the Norman Conquest in England. Besides his holdings around Auretone, he also held lands nearby, extending into Worcestershire and Shropshire.

When William the Conqueror invaded England, Richard joined the Norman cause and took part in the fighting against Eadric the Wild in Herefordshire.

Richard married the daughter of Robert the Deacon, who may be the same person as Robert fitzWimarc. Richard's heir was his son, Osbern fitzRichard, who held Richard's Castle by the time of the Domesday Book. He had another son William also.

Richard's date of death is unknown, but his heir held his lands by 1086.
