= Richard Fitz Pons =

Anglo-Norman noble

Richard Fitz Pons (Note: fitz Pontz, fitzPontz, fitz Poyntz, fitzPoyntz, fitzPonce) (c. 1080 – 1129) was an Anglo-Norman nobleman, active as a marcher lord on the border with Wales.

He is described as a follower of Bernard de Neufmarché, and probably first builder of Bronllys Castle. He started construction at Llandovery Castle in 1116.

== Family ==
His father was Pons Fitz Pons (c. 1034 – bef. 1086). He married Matilda Fitz Walter (died after 1127), daughter of Walter Fitz Roger, Sheriff of Gloucestershire, and Bertha de Ballun. The baron Walter de Clifford was one of their four children.

Richard was the heir of Drogo Fitz Pons and Walter Fitz Pons, both mentioned in the Domesday Book of 1086. He is now taken to be their nephew. They had lands in Gloucestershire, Herefordshire, Pinxton in Derbyshire, and Glasshampton in Worcestershire. (Note: Drogo also in Wiltshire, large holdings in Devon.)
