= Osbern fitzRichard =

11th-century English tenant-in-chief

Osbern fitzRichard (sometimes Osbern fitz Richard Scrob; died after 1088) was a Frenchman, perhaps Norman, who was a landowner and tenant-in-chief in England. Osbern served as a royal judge and sided with the baronial rebels at the start of King William II's reign, although he later returned to the king's service.

== Background ==
Osbern was the son of Richard Scrob, who arrived in England before the Norman Conquest of England. Richard's origins are not known for certain, except that he is from France, and may have been a Norman. Richard was the builder of Richard's Castle in Herefordshire, one of the few castles in England that predates the Norman Conquest.

== Career ==
Osbern held Richard's Castle at the time of Domesday Book in 1086. His holding of Richard's Castle as a tenant-in-chief is considered to have made him a feudal baron. Domesday Book records Osbern as owning lands adjacent to his father's lands in 1066, while his father was still alive.

Osbern added to the lands he had held in 1066 not only by inheritance from his father, but also from his marriage, from royal gifts, and by enfeoffment from other landholders such as the bishop of Worcester and Roger de Montgomery, the earl of Shrewsbury. His lands in 1086 were situated in Worcestershire, Warwickshire, Nottinghamshire, and Bedfordshire. They were worth over 100 pounds a year.

Osbern served as a royal judge in Worcestershire during the 1080s, and during the Rebellion of 1088 took the side of the baronial rebels against King William II. His disaffection from the king was not long-lasting, as he later served William.

== Family and legacy ==
Osbern married Nesta or Nest, the daughter of Gruffydd ap Llywelyn and Ealdgyth. Ealdgyth was the daughter of Ælfgar, Earl of Mercia.

Osbern and his wife had a son, Hugh fitzOsbern, and a daughter, Nesta (or perhaps Agnes), who married Bernard de Neufmarché. Osbern perhaps had another son, Turstin, who is named as the brother of Hugh fitzOsbern in a charter of Osbern fitzPons.

Osbern's date of death is unknown, occurring sometime after 1088, perhaps after 1100. His heir was his son, Hugh.
