= Humphrey II de Bohun =

Anglo-Norman nobleman

Humphrey II de Bohun (c. 1100 – died 1164/5) of Trowbridge Castle in Wiltshire and of Caldicot Castle in south-east Wales, feudal baron of Trowbridge, was an Anglo-Norman nobleman, the third generation of the Bohun family settled in England after the Norman Conquest of 1066.

== Origins ==
Humphrey was the son and heir of Humphrey I de Bohun (died c .1123), 3rd feudal baron of Trowbridge, by his wife Maud of Salisbury, a daughter of Edward of Salisbury (died 1130), an Anglo-Saxon and 2nd feudal baron of Trowbridge and of Chitterne, both in Wiltshire.

== Career ==
Following his father's death in about 1123, Humphrey inherited large estates centred on Trowbridge Castle, the caput of his feudal barony, although he still owed feudal relief for his inheritance as late as 1130. Together with his widowed mother he founded the Cluniac priory of Monkton Farleigh in accordance with his father's wishes. By 1130, he owed four hundred marks to the Crown for the office of Lord High Steward, which he had purchased. He appears in royal charters of King Henry I towards the end of his reign in 1135, and in 1136 he signed the charter of liberties issued by King Stephen at his Oxford court.

In the civil war during Stephen's reign, Humphrey sided with his rival, the Empress Matilda, after she landed in England in 1139. He repelled a royal army besieging his castle at Trowbridge, and in 1144 Matilda confirmed his possessions, granted him some further lands, and recognised his "stewardship in England and Normandy". He consistently witnessed charters of Matilda as steward in the 1140s and between 1153 and 1157 he witnessed the charters of her son King Henry II (1154–1189), in the same capacity.

In 1158, Humphrey appears to have fallen from favour, as he was deprived of the custody of certain royal demesne lands in Wiltshire. He does not appear in any royal act until January 1164, when he was present for the promulgation of the Constitutions of Clarendon.

== Marriage and children ==
Humphrey married Margaret of Hereford, who was the daughter of Miles of Gloucester, 1st Earl of Hereford and his wife Sibyl de Neufmarché. Margaret brought Caldicot Castle to the marriage. Margaret and Humphrey had the following children:

- Humphrey III de Bohun, eldest son and heir
- Margery de Bohun, who married Waleran de Beaumont, 4th Earl of Warwick

== Death ==
Humphrey died sometime before 29 September 1165, and was succeeded by his son Humphrey III de Bohun.

== Sources ==
- Graeme White, "Bohun, Humphrey (III) de (b. before 1144, d. 1181)," Oxford Dictionary of National Biography, Oxford University Press, 2004, accessed 20 December 2009.
