= William of Hereford =

Anglo-Normand noble

William of Hereford, Baron Abergavenny was a holder of the feudal lordship of Abergavenny in the Welsh Marches in the mid twelfth century.

== Lineage ==
William of Hereford was a son of Miles of Gloucester, 1st Earl of Hereford and his wife Sybil de Neufmarche, daughter of Bernard de Neufmarché of Brecon.

His brothers were Mahel of Hereford and Walter of Hereford.

== Offices ==
He was made King's Constable of the region and succeeded to the title of Baron Abergavenny about 1164.

== Death ==
William of Hereford died as a result of injuries sustained from falling masonry during a fire at Bronllys Castle near modern Talgarth, Powys in 1166. He died without issue.
