= Trowbridge Castle =

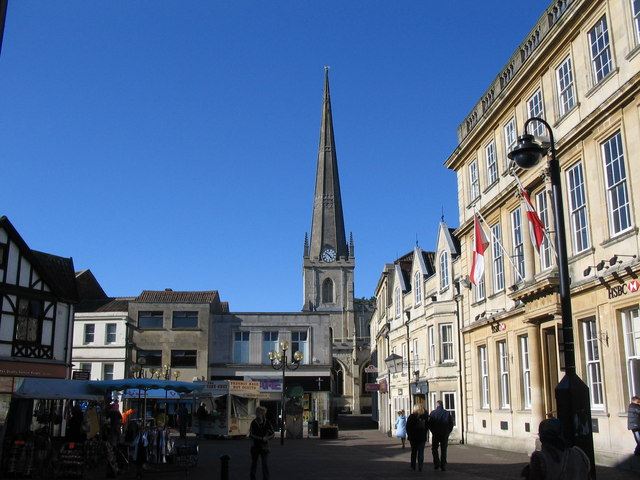
Fore Street, the location of the lower ditch

Trowbridge Castle was a castle in Trowbridge, Wiltshire. It is thought to have been a motte-and-bailey castle, and its influence can still be seen in the town today. Fore Street follows the path of the castle ditch, and town has a Castle Street and the Castle Place Shopping Centre.

The only surviving ruins are a ditch along Fore Street and a possible fragment of curtain wall found in 1986.

== History ==
It is likely the Castle was built by Humphrey I de Bohun during the 1100s but before his death around 1123. The first records of Trowbridge Castle date to 1139 when it was besieged. Within Trowbridge Castle was a 10th-century Anglo-Saxon church, which no longer exists today. Henry de Bohun turned this to secular use and instead had a new church built outside the Castle; this was the first St James's Church, in the base of the tower of the present-day church.

By the 14th century, it was no longer used as a fort, and by the time John Leland visited in 1540, it was in ruins. In 1670, Aubrey referred to it as a "ruinated castle of the Dukes of Lancaster". Potsherds dating to the 17th century indicate that the castle fell out of use around 1600. In 1875 Canon Jones made a detailed plan and description of the remains of the castle, noting that fragments of the ditch, tower and ramparts were extant. Today, the tower and ramparts are no longer extant.

The first excavations, at Court Street, between 1902 and 1924 found 12th-century tombstones and burials that were associated with the castle. Later excavations in 1986 found a ruined medieval wall probably pertaining to the outer curtain wall of the castle, which would make the wall one of the last surviving ruins of the castle. The ditch along Fore Street was successfully located in 1988, although nowadays it is hard to spot.
