= Henry FitzMiles =

Norman Baron (died c. 1162)

Henry FitzMiles (or Henry de Hereford), Baron Abergavenny (died c. 1162) was a Norman baron and a Marcher Lord in the Welsh Marches.

== Birth ==
It is believed he may have been born in Gloucester around 1128. He was the third son of Miles de Gloucester, 1st Earl of Hereford and Sibyl de Neufmarché.

== Titles and offices ==
He is thought to have held the title of Baron Abergavenny from approximately 1160. He was both High Sheriff of Gloucestershire and Herefordshire and held the title King's Constable.

== Death and burial ==
He died between 1159 and 1163 but maybe as late as 1175, believed to have been slain by Seisyll ap Dyfnwal, a Welsh Lord of Upper Gwent, the northern half of the old Welsh Kingdom of Gwent. He was killed at this Welshman's home, Castle Arnold in the valley of the River Usk, on eve of Easter. His death, whether it was murder or in conflict, was avenged by his nephew, William de Braose, 4th Lord of Bramber in 1175 at Abergavenny Castle.

He is buried at Llanthony Priory in the Vale of Ewyas, a deep valley in the Black Mountains of Wales.
