= Walter of Hereford =

Walter of Hereford was a holder of the feudal title Baron Bergavenny or Lord Abergavenny in the Welsh Marches in the mid twelfth century.

== Lineage ==
Walter of Hereford was a son of Miles of Gloucester, 1st Earl of Hereford, and Sibyl of Neufmarche, and the brother of Roger Fitzmiles, 2nd Earl of Hereford and Mahel of Hereford and William de Hereford.

== Offices ==
Walter of Hereford held the post of King's Constable in the region under King Henry I of England and became lord of Brecon and Abergavenny from circa 1155. In 1155 he was also made hereditary Sheriff of Gloucestershire, a post he held for two years, and Sheriff of Herefordshire, a post he held until 1159.

He departed for the Holy Land on Crusade about Michaelmas 1159, and died there not long after. On his death the shrievalty of Gloucestershire was no longer hereditary. No children are known.
