= Mahel of Hereford =

Mahel of Hereford was a holder of the feudal lordships of Brecon and Abergavenny in the Welsh Marches in the mid 12th century.

== Lineage ==
Mahel of Hereford was a younger son of Miles of Gloucester, 1st Earl of Hereford and his wife Sibyl of Neufmarche, daughter of Bernard de Neufmarche, Lord of Brecon.

His brothers were Walter and William of Hereford.

== Offices ==
Mahel held the posts of King's Constable in the region and succeeded to the lordships of Brecon and Abergavenny in 1163. In 1163 or 1164 he attended the Council of Clarendon.

He died about 1164, without issue, and is buried at Llanthony Priory, Monmouthshire.
