= Edward Devereux =

Edward Devereux may refer to:

- Sir Edward Devereux, 1st Baronet of Castle Bromwich (died 1622), English politician
- Edward Devereux, 11th Viscount Hereford (c. 1710–1760), British peer
- Edward Devereux, 12th Viscount Hereford (1741–1783), English peer
