= Sir Robert de Cornwall =

British member of parliament

Sir Robert de Cornwall (1700 – 4 April 1756) was a British member of parliament.

He was born in 1700, the eldest surviving son of Vice admiral Charles Cornewall and Dorothy Hanmer, and was baptised at Eye, Herefordshire on 21 April 1700.

He joined the army, becoming a Cornet in the 2nd Dragoon Guards in 1715, and being promoted to Lieutenant in 1717. He probably resigned his commission on inheriting his father's estate at Berrington, Herefordshire in 1718.

From this year onwards, he styled himself "Sir Robert de Cornwall," claiming that George I had promised his father a baronetcy. In the general election of 1734, he made the first of two unsuccessful attempts to represent Leominster. He served as High Sheriff of Radnorshire in 1738, before making his second attempt at Leominster in a By-election in 1742.

He was finally successful in being elected to Leominster when he topped the poll at the general election of 1747, and represented the town in the Whig interest until 1754, when he stood for Bishops Castle and was again defeated. In 1753 he was appointed Provincial Grand Master of the Freemasons of the Western shires by Lord Carysfort.

He died suddenly, having forecast his own demise and that of his cousin General Henry Cornewall, as recorded in the Gentleman's Magazine:

It is remarkable that a few days before this gentleman's illness, he foretold that he should soon be taken ill, and that his cousin, Gen. Cornwall, and another gentleman of his acquaintance, would also be taken ill at the same time, and they should all die within a short space of each other. The General was accordingly taken ill, as Sir Robert had predicted, and not knowing what he had said concerning their illness and death, told his friends to the same purport. The two cousins died within a few minutes of one another. The gentleman their friend was taken ill about the same time but is recovered.

Sir Robert died unmarried on 4 April 1756 and was buried at Eye 13 days later. His estate was inherited by his nephew Charles Wolfran Cornwall.

Parliament of Great Britain
Preceded by Robert Harley; Capel Hanbury	Member of Parliament for Leominster; 1747–1754; With: James Peachey	Succeeded by Sir Charles Hanbury Williams; Richard Gorges
