= Great Catherine =

Great Catherine may refer to:

- Catherine the Great (1729–1796), leader of Russia
- Great Catherine: Whom Glory Still Adores, 1913 play by George Bernard Shaw
- Great Catherine (film), 1968 British film starring Peter O'Toole, Zero Mostel, Jeanne Moreau, and Jack Hawkins

== See also ==
- Katharine the Great, Deborah Davis' 1979 biography of Katharine Graham
