= Charles Hanbury Williams =

British politician, diplomat and writer (1708–1759)

Sir Charles Hanbury Williams KB
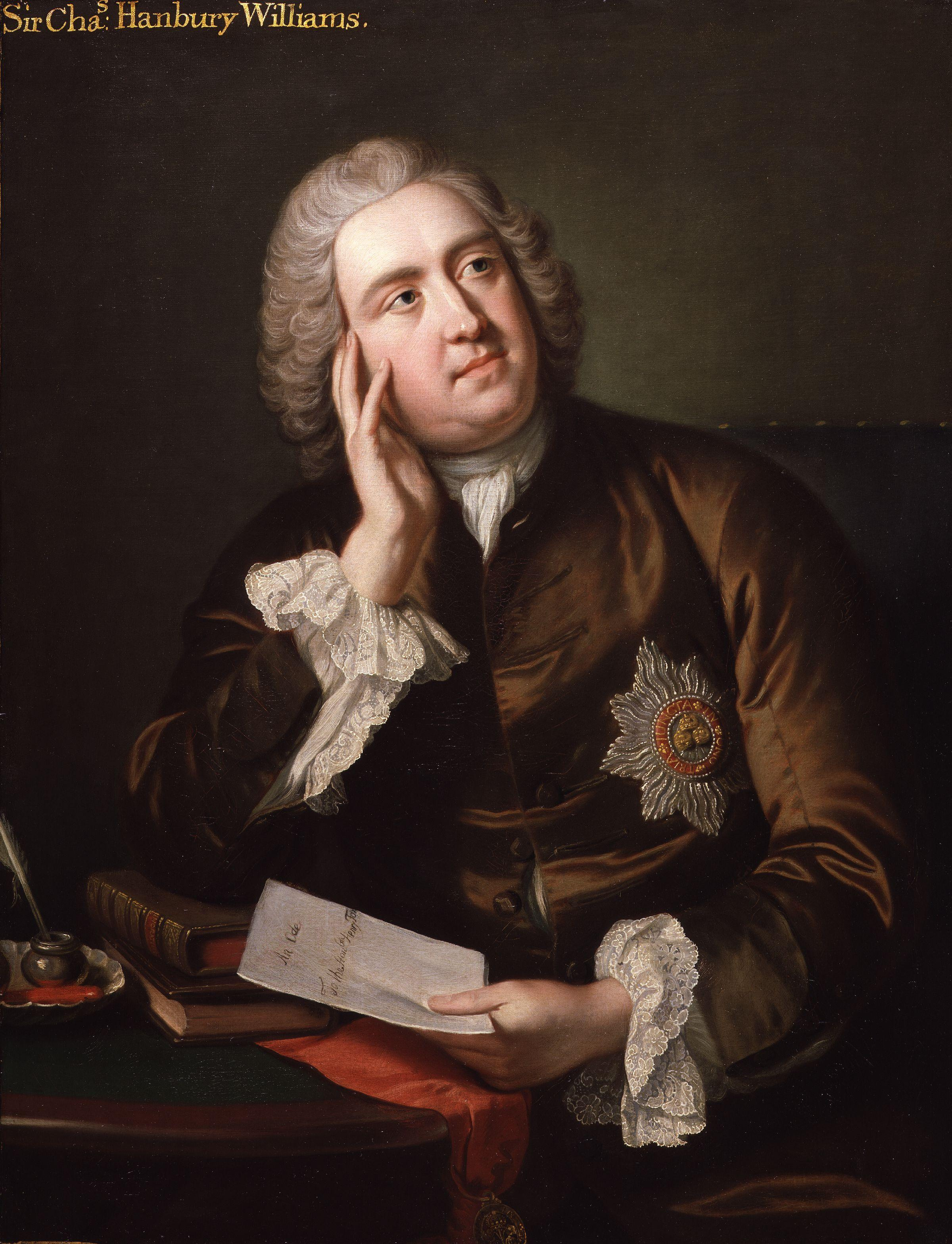
- Portrait attributed to John Giles Eccardt, c. 1746

Member of Parliament for Leominster
- In office 1754–1759 Serving with Richard Gorges
- Preceded by: Sir Robert de Cornwall; James Peachey
- Succeeded by: Richard Gorges; Chase Price

Member of Parliament for Monmouthshire
- In office 1735–1747 Serving with Thomas Morgan
- Preceded by: John Hanbury; Thomas Morgan
- Succeeded by: William Morgan; Capel Hanbury

Personal details
- Born: 8 December 1708
- Died: 2 November 1759 (aged 50)
- Spouse: Lady Frances Coningsby (m. 1732)
- Relations: Sir Edward Ayscough (grandfather)
- Parent(s): John Hanbury; Bridget Ayscough Hanbury

Sir Charles Hanbury Williams, KB (8 December 1708 – 2 November 1759) was a British Whig politician, diplomat and writer. He was a Member of Parliament from 1734 until his death.

== Early life ==
Hanbury was the son of a Welsh ironmaster and Member of Parliament, John Hanbury, and his second wife, Bridget Ayscough, eldest daughter of Sir Edward Ayscough of Stallingborough and South Kelsey. With his father's marriage to Bridget came a fortune of £10,000 and connections with established political families. His mother was a close friend of Sarah Churchill, Duchess of Marlborough.

Charles went to Eton, where he befriended the novelist Henry Fielding. In 1720, he assumed the name of Williams, under the terms of a bequest from his godfather, Charles Williams of Caerleon.

== Career ==
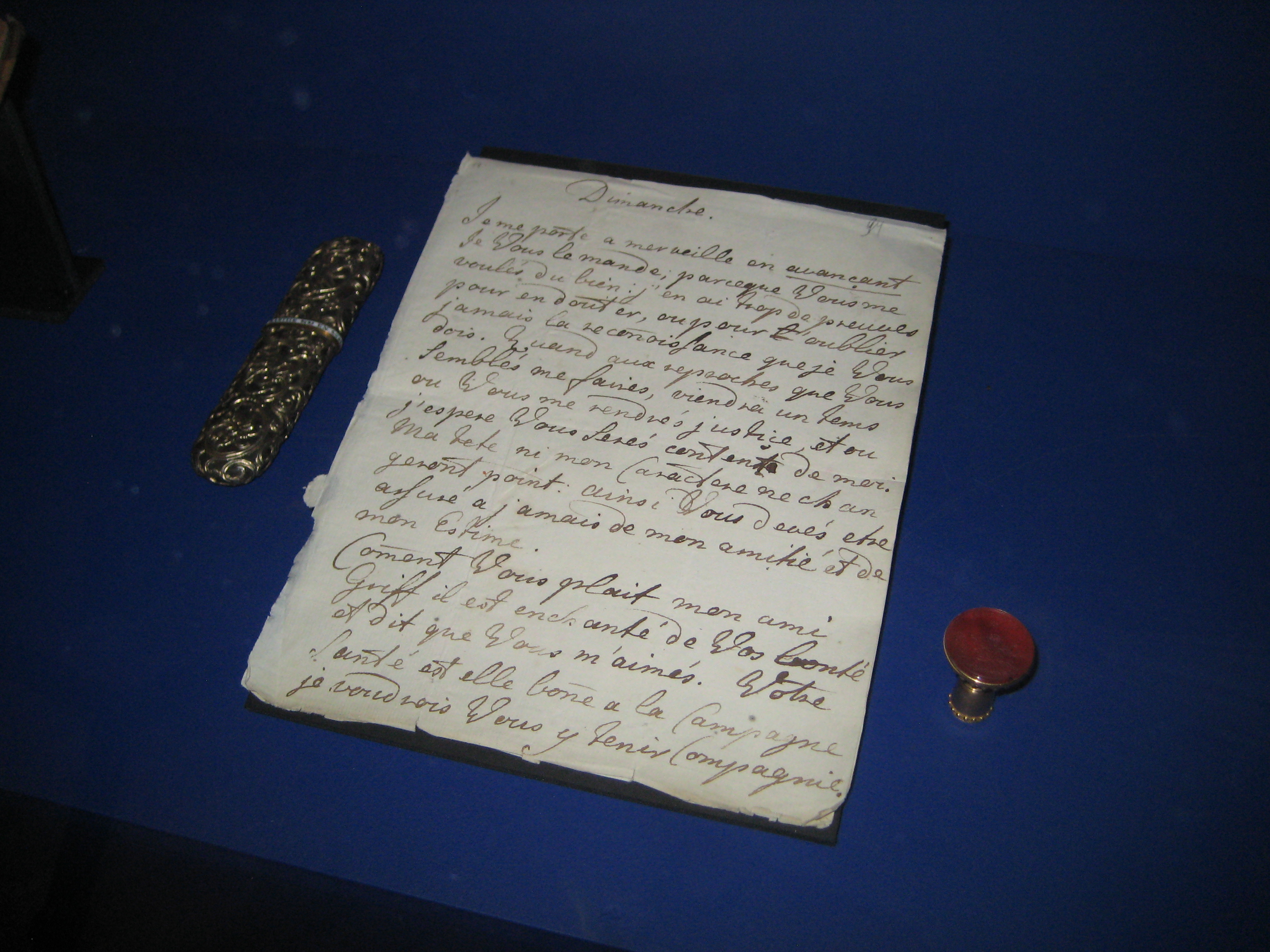
A letter to Sir Charles Williams, by Grand Duchess Catherine Alexeyevna

Williams entered Parliament in 1734, representing the Monmouthshire constituency as a supporter of Robert Walpole, and held the seat until 1747. In 1754 he returned to the House of Commons as one of two elected members for Leominster, which he represented until his death in 1759.

From 1747 to 1750, Williams served as the British ambassador in Dresden. In 1748 he had the same function in Poland and witnessed a Polish Sejm, where he met members of the influential Czartoryski family (August Aleksander Czartoryski). When the future King of Poland, Stanisław Poniatowski, was receiving medical treatment in Berlin, Sir Charles met him when sent there as Ambassador (1750–1751). He entered into Polish and Russian history in Saint Petersburg in 1755 by introducing Stanisław Poniatowski to the Russian Grand Duchess Catherine Alexeyevna (the future Catherine the Great, Empress of Russia), from which a famous romance developed between the Polish aristocrat and the wife of the Russian heir-apparent.

In 1739, Williams gave support for the establishment of the Foundling Hospital and served as one of its founding governors. Williams's father bought the Coldbrook Park estate near Abergavenny for him from his godfather's bequest. There he added a nine-bay, two-storey Georgian façade in 1746.

=== Seven Years' War ===
Williams played a major role as a British envoy (1752-1759) at the court in Russia during the Seven Years' War of 1756-1763. Although Russia went to war (1756-1762) against Britain's ally Prussia, Russia and Britain remained at peace.

=== Poet ===
Hanbury Williams became known as one of the prominent wits about town, and following in the tradition of Alexander Pope (1688-1744) he wrote a great deal of satirical light verse, including Isabella, or the Morning (1740), satires on Ruth Darlington and Pulleney (1741–1742), The Country Girl (1742), Lessons for the Day (1742), and Letter to Mr Dodsley (1743). Collections of his poems appeared in 1763 and of his Works in 1822. Horace Walpole praised the wit of his poetry and wrote of his "biting satire".

== Personal life ==
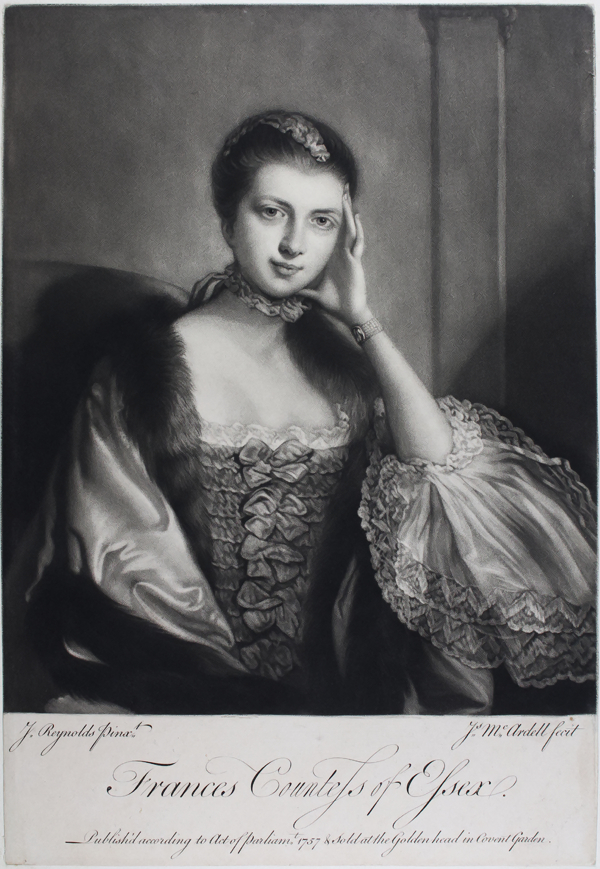
Frances, daughter to Charles Hanbury Williams

On 1 July 1732, he married Lady Frances Coningsby (1707/8–1781) at St James, Westminster, London. Lady Frances was a daughter of Thomas Coningsby, 1st Earl Coningsby and Lady Frances Jones (second daughter and sole heiress of Richard Jones, 1st Earl of Ranelagh and the Hon. Frances Willoughby, a daughter and heiress of Francis Willoughby, 5th Baron Willoughby). Together, they had two daughters:

- Frances Hanbury-Williams (c. 1735–1759), who married William Capel, 4th Earl of Essex, the son of William Capell, 3rd Earl of Essex and Lady Elizabeth Russell (a daughter of Wriothesley Russell, 2nd Duke of Bedford).
- Charlotte Hanbury-Williams (1738–1790), who married Robert Boyle-Walsingham, the fifth and youngest son of Henry Boyle, 1st Earl of Shannon, in 1759. He was lost aboard HMS Thunderer in a West Indian hurricane.

Charles Hanbury Williams died insane in 1759 and the Coldbrook estate passed to his brother George. His widow died on 31 December 1781 and was buried at Westminster Abbey.

=== Descendants ===
Through his eldest daughter Frances, he was grandfather to Elizabeth Capel (wife of John Monson, 3rd Baron Monson) and George Capel-Coningsby, 5th Earl of Essex, who married Sarah Bazett, and after her death, Catherine Stephens).

Through his second daughter Charlotte, he was grandfather to Richard Boyle-Walsingham (1762–1788), who died unmarried, and Charlotte Boyle-Walsingham, later suo jure Baroness de Ros, who married Lord Henry FitzGerald, fourth son of James FitzGerald, 1st Duke of Leinster and Lady Emily Lennox, Duchess of Leinster.

=== Legacy ===
Williams inspired the character Charles Edaston in the 1913 George Bernard Shaw play Great Catherine, which recounts the story of a British envoy to Catherine's court. It was filmed starring Peter O'Toole in 1968. Williams also left poems said to be "witty but licentious".

== Sources ==
Parliament of Great Britain
Preceded by John Hanbury; Thomas Morgan	Member of Parliament for Monmouthshire; 1735–1747; With: Thomas Morgan	Succeeded by William Morgan; Capel Hanbury
Preceded by Sir Robert de Cornwall; James Peachey	Member of Parliament for Leominster; 1754–1759; With: Richard Gorges	Succeeded by Richard Gorges; Chase Price
Diplomatic posts
Preceded by Hon. Thomas Villiers	British Ambassador to Poland; 1747–1755	Succeeded by Viscount Stormont
Preceded by Hon. Thomas Villiers	British Ambassador to Saxony; 1747–1750	Succeeded by Viscount Stormont
Preceded by Henry Legge	British Ambassador to Prussia; 1749–1751	Unknown Next known title holder: Andrew Mitchell
Preceded by The Earl of Hyndford	British Ambassador to Russia; 1752–1759	Succeeded by Robert Murray Keith the Elder
Honorary titles
Preceded by The Duke of Chandos	Lord Lieutenant of Herefordshire; 1741–1747	Succeeded by The Viscount Bateman
