= Thomas Morgan (judge advocate) =

Welsh lawyer and politician

- Born: 20 May 1702
- Died: 12 April 1769 (aged 66)
- Spouse: Jane Colchester
- Children: Thomas Morgan (of Rhiwpera); Charles Morgan (1736–1787); John Morgan (of Dderw)
- Father: John Morgan

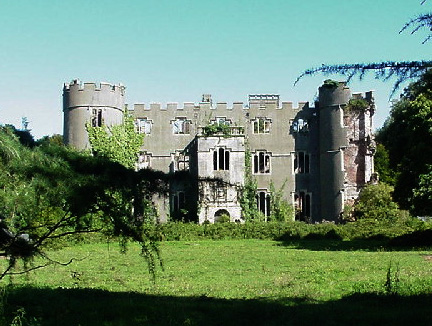
Rhiwperra Castle

Thomas Morgan (20 May 1702 – 12 April 1769) was a Welsh lawyer and politician who sat in the House of Commons from 1723 to 1769.

Morgan was the younger son of John Morgan and his wife Martha Vaughan, daughter of Gwyn Vaughan of Trebarried, Breconshire. He received the estate of Rhiwpera upon his father's death in 1720.

Morgan was returned as Member of Parliament for Brecon at a by-election on 24 May 1723. He was returned in a contest for Brecon at the 1727 British general election. In 1731, he succeeded his brother, Sir William Morgan, as Lord Lieutenant of Brecknockshire and Monmouthshire, and was appointed brigadier-general of the militia of those counties. At the 1734 British general election, he was returned unopposed as MP for Monmouthshire, and was returned there again at the 1741 British general election. Also in 1741 was appointed Judge Advocate General, by which he became known as "General Morgan". He was returned for Breconshire at the 1747 British general election.

Morgan was returned unopposed for Breconshire again in 1754, 1761 and 1768.

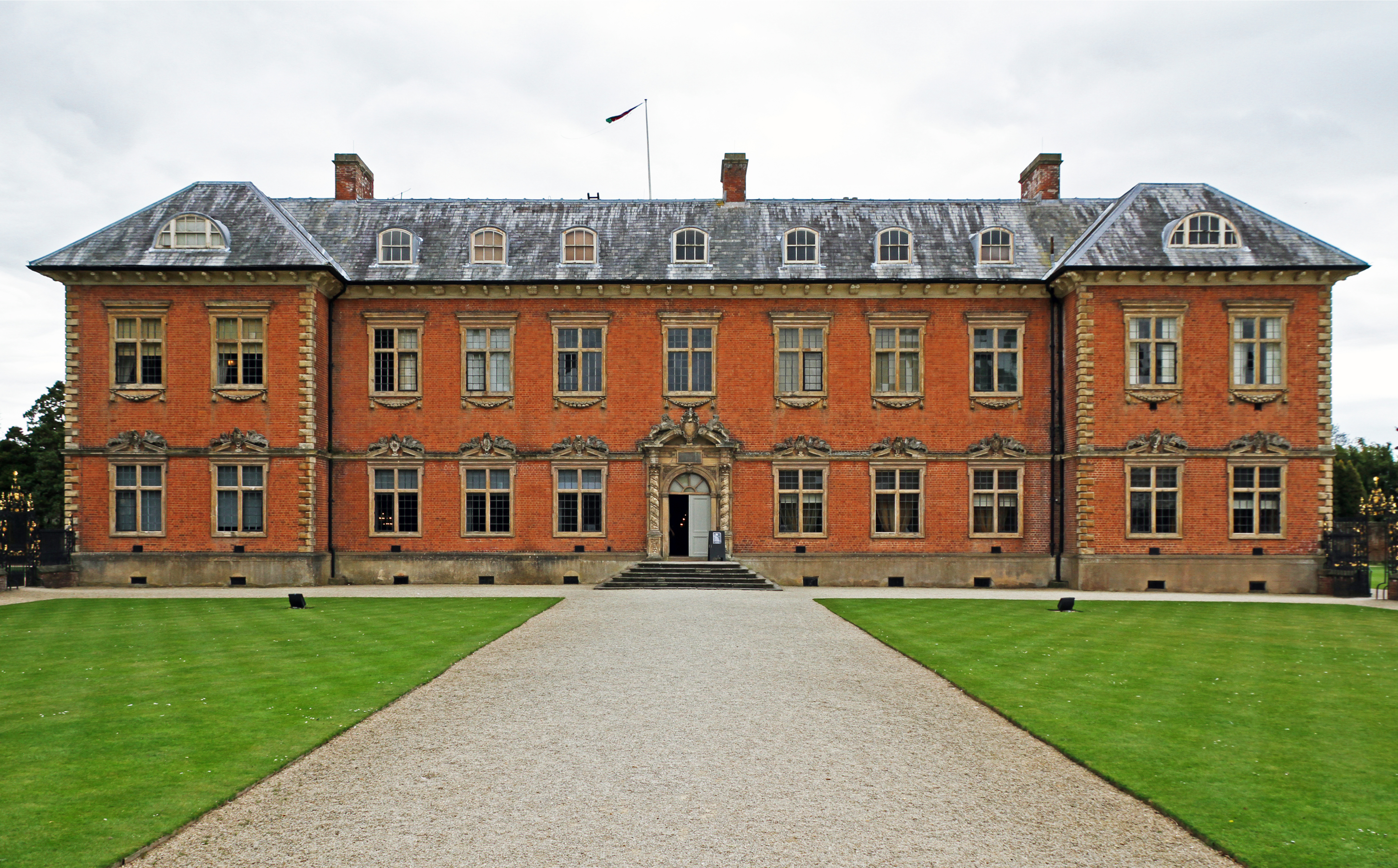
Tredegar House

Upon the death of his nephew William Morgan in 1763, he inherited the Tredegar Estate. In 1768, he resigned the office of Judge Advocate General, and was succeeded by his deputy and son-in-law Charles Gould.

Around 1726, he had married Jane Colchester, the second daughter of Col. Maynard Colchester. His children by her included:

- Thomas Morgan (of Rhiwpera) (1727–1771)
- Jane Morgan (1731–1797), married Charles Gould, later Sir Charles Gould Morgan, 1st Baronet
- Catherine Morgan (d. 1784), married Charles Van
- Charles Morgan (1736–1787)
- John Morgan (1742–1792)

== Death ==
Thomas Morgan died on 12 April 1769.

Parliament of Great Britain
Preceded by William Morgan	Member of Parliament for Brecon; 1723–1734	Succeeded by John Talbot
Preceded by John Hanbury; Lord Charles Somerset	Member of Parliament for Monmouthshire; 1734–1747; With: John Hanbury 1734; Charles Hanbury Williams 1735–1747	Succeeded by William Morgan; Capel Hanbury
Preceded by John Jeffreys	Member of Parliament for Breconshire; 1747–1769	Succeeded by Charles Morgan
Legal offices
Preceded by Sir Henry Hoghton, Bt	Judge Advocate General; 1741–1768	Succeeded by Charles Gould
Honorary titles
Preceded by Sir William Morgan	Lord Lieutenant of Brecknockshire and Monmouthshire; 1731–1769	Succeeded by Thomas Morgan
