= William Morgan (of Tredegar, younger) =

Welsh politician

William Morgan (28 March 1725 – 16 July 1763) was a Welsh politician of the mid-18th century.

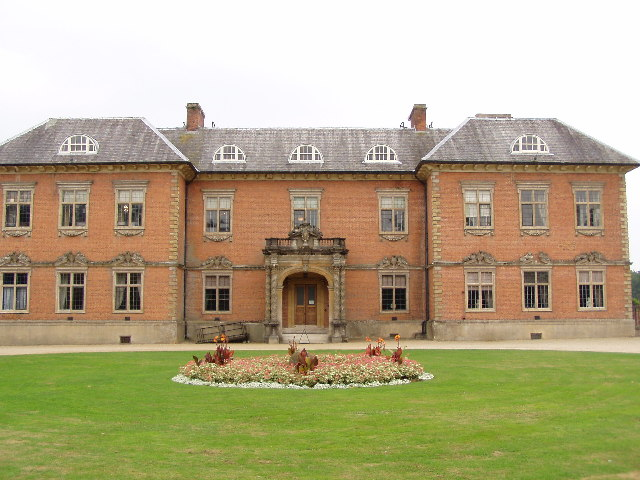
Tredegar House

He was the eldest son of Sir William Morgan and his wife Lady Rachel Cavendish, daughter of William Cavendish, 2nd Duke of Devonshire. He inherited the Tredegar Estate upon his father's death in 1725. Morgan matriculated at Christ Church, Oxford on 9 June 1743. He entered the House of Commons in 1747 as Member of Parliament for Monmouthshire, and was Bailiff of Brecon in 1749. He continued to represent Monmouthshire until his death in 1763.

William died unmarried, and as all his siblings had predeceased him, Tredegar was inherited by his uncle Thomas Morgan. This led to a legal battle between Thomas and Lady Rachel over control of the estate.

Parliament of Great Britain
| Preceded by Thomas Morgan; Charles Hanbury Williams | Member of Parliament for Monmouthshire; 1747–1763; With: Capel Hanbury | Succeeded by Capel Hanbury; Thomas Morgan |
