= Jenison Shafto =

English politician

Jenison Shafto (c. 1728 – 13 May 1771), of West Wratting Park, Cambridgeshire, was an English politician, race-horse owner, and gambler.

He was second son of Robert Shafto of Benwell Towers, Northumberland. He served in the army with the 1st Foot Guards, being commissioned as ensign in 1745 and retiring as lieutenant in 1755.

He was a Member (MP) of the Parliament of Great Britain for Leominster from 1761 to 1768 and for Castle Rising from 1768 until his death. His only recorded speech in the House of Commons was made on 18 March 1762, proposing the militia be sent to serve abroad, during the Seven Years' War, reputedly done to win a wager of £200 laid at his London club, Arthur's.

As a horse owner, Shafto's thoroughbred racers included: Snap, which he bought in 1752 and sold after it had won three 1000-guinea match races at Newmarket; Squirrel, another successful racer which was retired for stud in 1760 and lived until 1780; and Goldfinder, sired by Snap, which won two Newmarket Challenge Cups and Whips before being sold to stud.

He was reported to have rode 100 miles every day for 29 days to Newmarket Heath, and then for 50 miles for 2 hours, for bets. In 1763, his reputation as a winning gambler at Newmarket was such that Horace Walpole wrote to Lord Hertford: "The beginning of October, one is certain everybody will be at Newmarket, and the Duke of Cumberland will lose, and Shafto win, two or three thousand pounds".

He committed suicide, having shot himself, in May 1771, which many attributed to gambling losses on the turf and elsewhere He had married on 24 November 1750 Margaret, daughter and co-heiress of Thomas Allen who was one of the main coal-owners of County Durham. The couple had no children and she died in 1766. After his death his brother Robert continued to run his West Wratting stables until his own death in 1780.

Parliament of Great Britain
Preceded by Chase Price; Richard Gorges	Member of Parliament for Leominster; 1761 – 1768; With: Chase Price to 1767; Edward Willes 1767 – Feb 1768; John Carnac from Feb 1768	Succeeded by John Carnac; The Viscount Bateman
Preceded by Hon. Thomas Howard; Charles Boone	Member of Parliament for Castle Rising; 1768 – 1771; With: Thomas Whately	Succeeded by Crisp Molineux; Thomas Whately
