= Chase Price =

British lawyer and politician

Chase Price (1731 – 28 June 1777) was a British lawyer and politician who sat in the House of Commons between 1759 and 1777.

== Early life ==
Price was the son of John Price of Knighton, then in Radnorshire, and his second wife Elizabeth Chase daughter of William Chase of Hadwall, Hertfordshire. He matriculated at Christ Church, Oxford, on 24 November 1749 at the age of eighteen, and was admitted at the Inner Temple in 1751. He was called to the bar in 1757.

== Political career ==
Price was returned unopposed as Member of Parliament for Leominster at a by-election on 1 December 1759. He was re-elected unopposed at the 1761 general election but resigned his seat in March 1767. In the 1768 general election he was returned unopposed as MP for Radnorshire and was re-elected in a contest at the 1774 general election.

== Family ==
Price married Susan Glanville, daughter of William Evelyn Glanville, of St Clere in Kent and his second wife Bridget Raymond on 21 March 1765. Their daughter Sarah Bridget Frances Price, born in 1767, married Bamber Gascoyne (the younger).

His brother Richard Price of Norton Manor, Knighton (died 1797), married Margaret Humphreys of Pennant, Montgomeryshire (died 1788), only daughter and heiress of Dr Charles Humphreys, and had issue. Richard's son Richard Price (1773–1861), became MP for Radnor from 1799 to 1847.

By his father's first marriage to Anne Barnsley of Knighton, only daughter and heiress of John Barnsley, Price was the half-brother of John Price (died 1780), Barrister from The Lodge, Clerk of Chancery at Leominster, unmarried, and of Henry Price (1722–1795), married in 1770 to Elizabeth Foley, daughter of Captain Thomas Foley, and had female issue.

Price was an ancestor of two British prime ministers, Robert Gascoyne-Cecil, 3rd Marquess of Salisbury, and Arthur Balfour.

== Sources ==
Parliament of Great Britain
Preceded by Sir Charles Hanbury-Williams; Richard Gorges	Member of Parliament for Leominster; 1759–1767; With: Richard Gorges to 1761; Jenison Shafto from 1761	Succeeded by Jenison Shafto; Edward Willes
Preceded by Marquess of Carnarvon	Member of Parliament for Radnorshire; 1768–1777	Succeeded by Thomas Johnes
