= Thomas Morgan (of Rhiwpera) =

Welsh politician

- Born: 8 June 1727
- Died: 15 May 1771 (aged 43)
- Father: Thomas Morgan

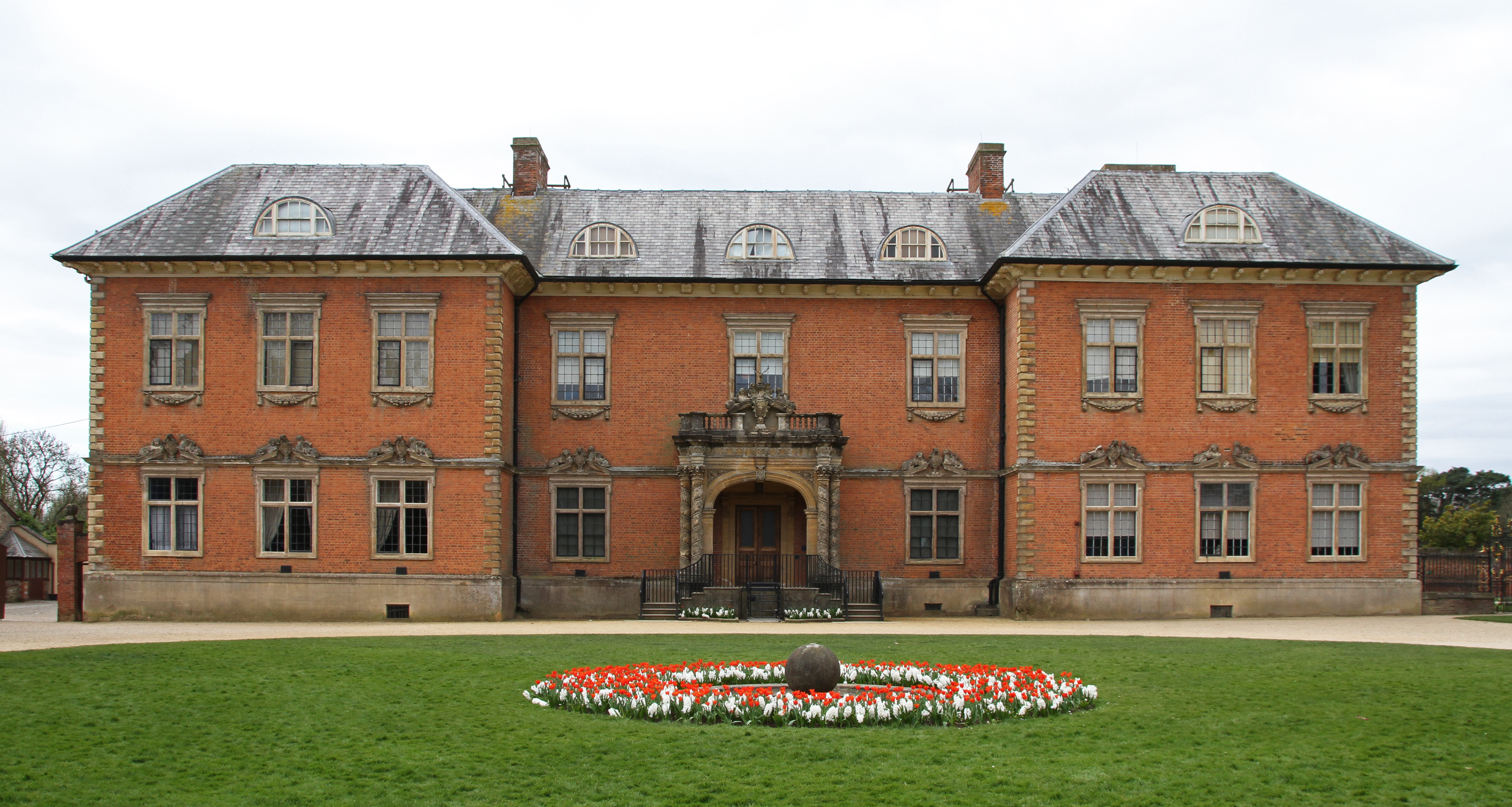
Tredegar House

Thomas Morgan (8 June 1727 – 15 May 1771) was a Welsh politician, of the Morgans of Tredegar. He was the eldest son of Thomas Morgan, Judge Advocate General of the Army, and his wife Jane Colchester.

Morgan represented Brecon in the House of Commons from 1754 until 1763. That year, he accepted the Stewardship of the Manor of Old Shoreham to succeed his late cousin, William Morgan in Monmouthshire, which he represented from 1763 until his death in 1771.

He was briefly Lord Lieutenant of Brecknockshire and Monmouthshire in succession to his father, who died in 1769. Morgan died unmarried, and left his estates (Rhiwperra Castle and Tredegar House) to his younger brother, Charles Morgan.

Parliament of Great Britain
Preceded by John Talbot	Member of Parliament for Brecon; 1754–1763	Succeeded by Charles Morgan
Preceded by William Morgan; Capel Hanbury	Member of Parliament for Monmouthshire; 1763–1771; With: Capel Hanbury 1763–1766; John Hanbury 1766–1771	Succeeded by John Hanbury; John Morgan
Honorary titles
Preceded by Thomas Morgan	Lord Lieutenant of Brecknockshire; 1770–1771	Succeeded by Charles Morgan
Preceded by Thomas Morgan	Lord Lieutenant of Monmouthshire; 1770–1771	Succeeded by The Duke of Beaufort
