= Lord Lieutenant of Brecknockshire =

Welsh county ceremonial officer

This is a list of people who served as Lord Lieutenant of Brecknockshire. After 1723, all Lord Lieutenants were also Custos Rotulorum of Brecknockshire. The office was abolished on 31 March 1974 and replaced with the Lord Lieutenant of Powys, with Deputy Lieutenants for Brecknockshire.

== Lords Lieutenant of Brecknockshire to 1974 ==
- see Lord Lieutenant of Wales before 1694
- Thomas Herbert, 8th Earl of Pembroke 11 May 1694 – 7 October 1715
- John Morgan 7 October 1715 – 7 March 1720
- Sir William Morgan 21 June 1720 – 24 April 1731
- Thomas Morgan 18 June 1731 – 12 April 1769
- Thomas Morgan 27 January 1770 – 15 May 1771
- Charles Morgan 23 December 1771 – 24 May 1787
- Henry Somerset, 5th Duke of Beaufort 8 June 1787 – 11 October 1803
- Henry Somerset, 6th Duke of Beaufort 4 November 1803 – 2 December 1835
- Penry Williams 24 December 1836 – 16 January 1847
- Lloyd Vaughan Watkins 17 February 1847 – 28 September 1865
- George Pratt, 2nd Marquess Camden 4 November 1865 – 8 August 1866
- Charles Morgan, 1st Baron Tredegar 27 September 1866 – 16 April 1875
- Joseph Bailey, 1st Baron Glanusk 11 June 1875 – 19 December 1905
- Joseph Bailey, 2nd Baron Glanusk 19 December 1905 – 11 January 1928
- Wilfred Bailey, 3rd Baron Glanusk 26 April 1928 – 12 January 1948
- Major General Sir Geoffrey Raikes 14 April 1948 – 17 April 1959
- Sir William Parker, 3rd Baronet 17 April 1959 – 20 January 1964
- Captain Nevill Glennie Garnons Williams, 20 January 1964 – 31 March 1974

== Deputy lieutenant of Brecknockshire ==
A deputy lieutenant of Brecknockshire is commissioned by the Lord Lieutenant of Brecknockshire. Deputy lieutenants support the work of the lord-lieutenant. There can be several deputy lieutenants at any time, depending on the population of the county. Their appointment does not terminate with the changing of the lord-lieutenant, but they usually retire at age 75.

=== 18th Century ===
- 1793: Henry Somerset, 6th Duke of Beaufort
- 12 May 1798: Henry Devereux, 14th Viscount Hereford
- 12 May 1798: John Powell

=== 20th Century ===
- 8 January 1900: Henry Somerset, 9th Duke of Beaufort
- 8 January 1900: Charles Evan-Thomas
- 8 January 1900: John Williams-Vaughan
- 8 January 1900: John Andrew Doyle
- 8 January 1900: Sir Charles Dillwyn-Venables-Llewelyn, 2nd Baronet

== Sources ==
- J.C. Sainty (1970). "Lieutenancies of Counties, 1585–1642". Bulletin of the Institute of Historical Research (Special Supplement No. 8).
- J.C. Sainty (1979). List of Lieutenants of Counties of England and Wales 1660–1974. London: Swift Printers (Sales) Ltd.
- The Lord-Lieutenants Order 1973 (1973/1754)
