= George Devereux, 13th Viscount Hereford =

British peer

George Devereux, 13th Viscount Hereford (25 April 1744 – 31 December 1804) was a British Peer.

He was the second son of Edward Devereux, 11th Viscount Hereford and his wife Catherine Mytton. His maternal grandparents were Richard Mytton of Pontyscowryd and Garth, High Sheriff of Montgomeryshire and Dorothy Wynn.

On 15 December 1768, George married his 3rd cousin, Marianna Devereux. His namesake father-in-law was George Devereux of Tregoyd. They had five children:

- Henry Devereux, 14th Viscount Hereford (9 February 1777 – 31 May 1843).
- Marianna Devereux (d. 9 December 1847). Married Sir James Cockburn, 9th Baronet.
- Charlotte Henrietta Marianna Devereux (d. 9 December 1847). Married Henry Wellington of Hay Castle.
- Juliana Stratford Marianna Devereux (d. 1850). Married Henry Eyre of Botleigh Grange.
- Catherine Eliza Marianna Devereux (d. 1856). Married first Walter Wilkins of Maeslough Castle and secondly William Richard Stretton.

His older brother Edward Devereux, 12th Viscount Hereford had succeeded their father but died childless on 1 August 1783. George succeeded him and further Viscounts Hereford descend from him.

Peerage of England
Preceded by Edward Devereux	Viscount Hereford; 1783–1804	Succeeded by Henry Devereux
