= Oxfordshire in the 1754 British general election =

- April 17, 1754

Both seats in Oxfordshire constituency
- Turnout: 7,856
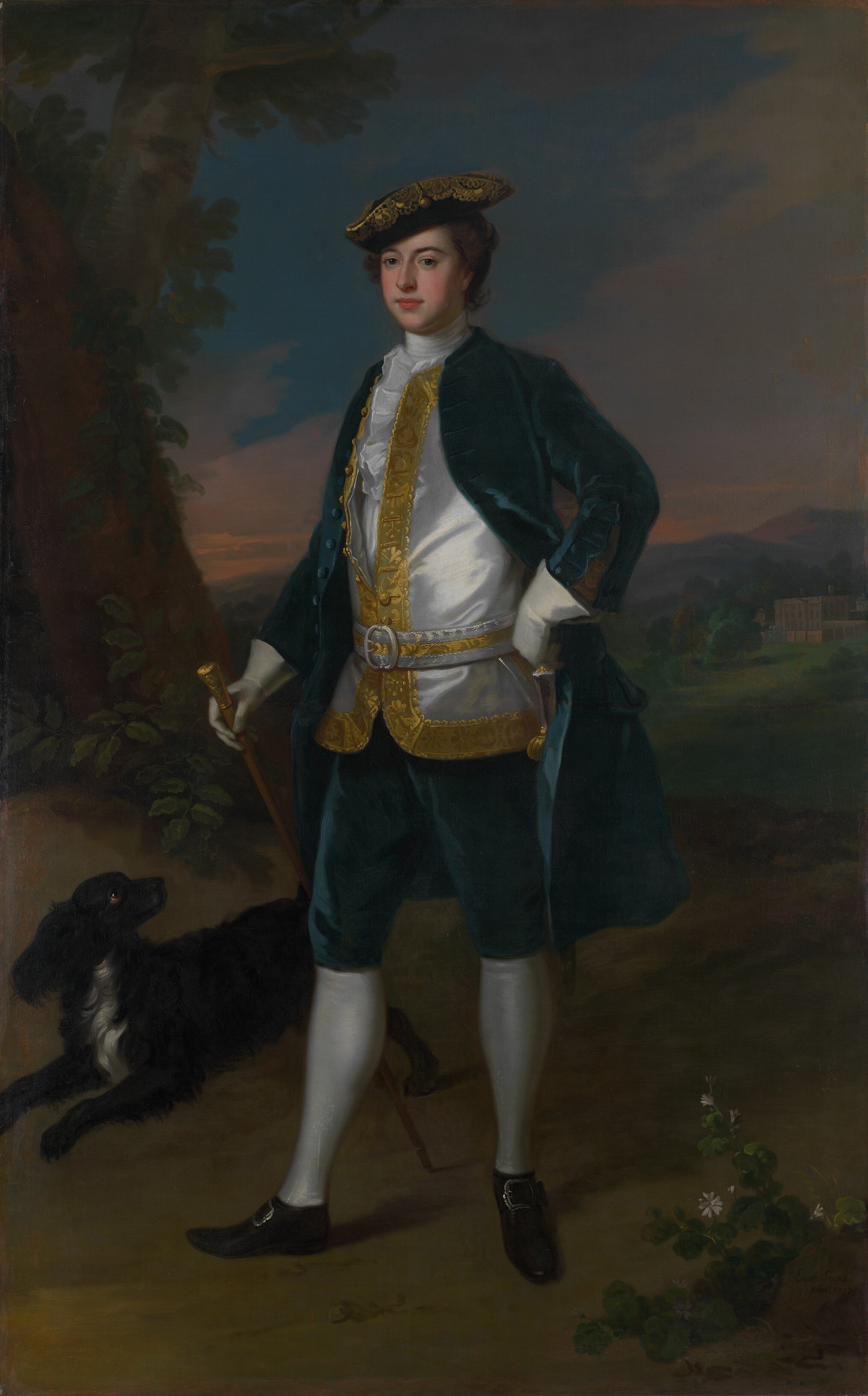

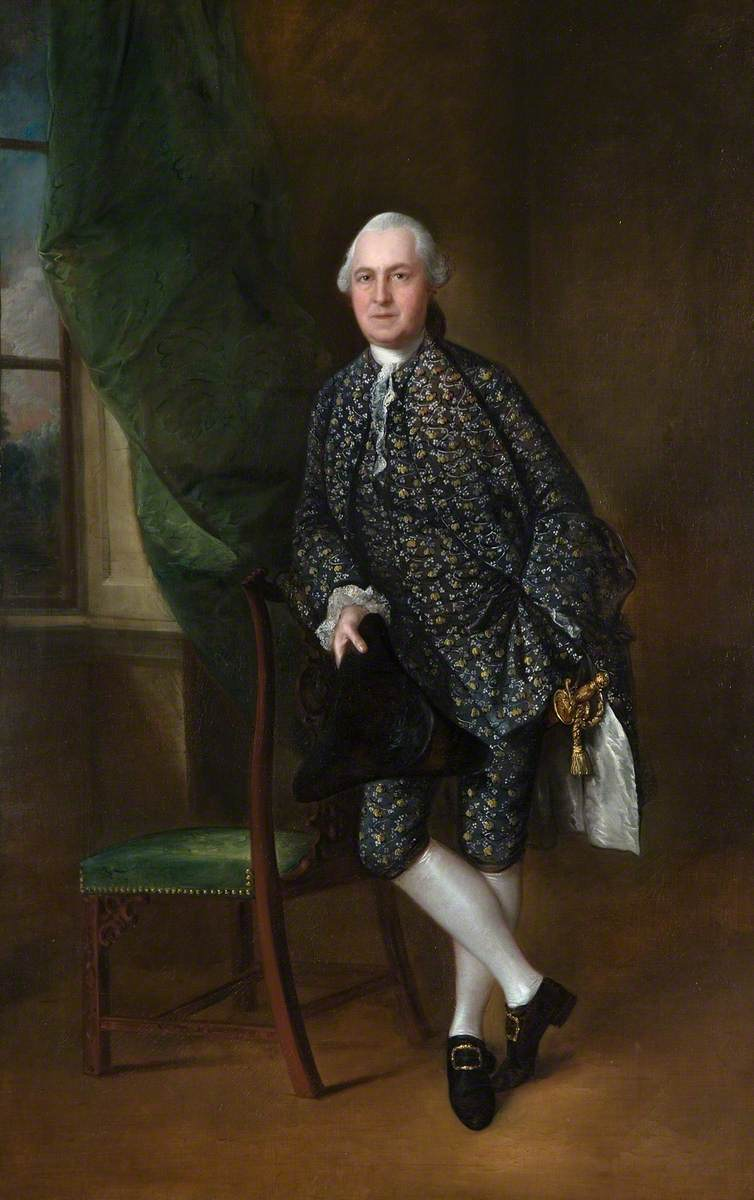
	First party	Second party
	Tory
Candidate	Philip Wenman	James Dashwood
Party	Tory	Tory
Popular vote	2,033	2,014
Percentage	25.88%	25.64%
	Third party	Fourth party
	Whig
Candidate	Thomas Parker	Sir Edward Turner
Party	Whig	Whig
Popular vote	1,919	1,890
Percentage	24.43%	24.06%
MPs before election
Sir James Dashwood
Norreys Bertie
Tory
Elected MPs
Thomas Parker
Edward Turner
Whig

The Oxfordshire Election of 1754, part of the British general election of that year and involving the selection of two Members of Parliament (MPs) to represent the Oxfordshire constituency, was probably the most notorious English county election of the 18th century. It was depicted in Hogarth's famous series of paintings and engravings, The Humours of an Election.

== Background ==
Oxfordshire was a county constituency electing two MPs. The right to vote was held by all the Forty Shilling Freeholders of the county, amounting to about 4,000 in 1754, but because of the expense of a contested election the competing interests tried to reach a compromise without resorting to a poll if at all possible, and in 1754 Oxfordshire had not seen a contested election for 44 years. The expenses entailed not only the cost of campaigning across the county, but the need for the candidates to meet the expenses of their voters in travelling to Oxford (where the poll was held in the grounds of Exeter College) and in lavishly entertaining them while they were there; but outright bribery was also rife.

== Campaign ==
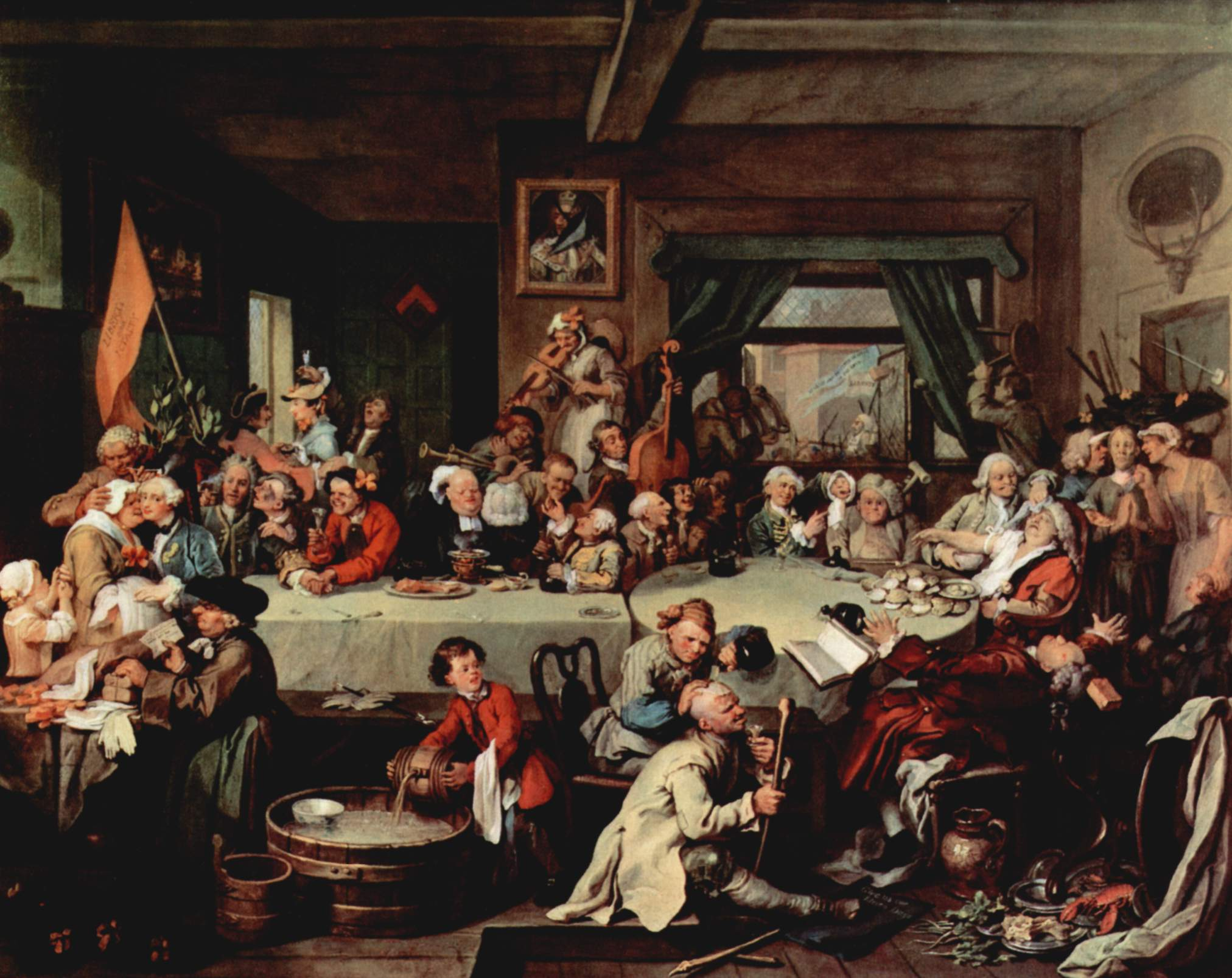
An Election Entertainment, depicting an election "treat" given by the Whigs to gain voters' support, one of Hogarth's series of paintings inspired by the Oxfordshire election of 1754

The candidates in 1754 were two Tories, Sir James Dashwood (who was standing for re-election) and The Viscount Wenman; and two Whigs, Viscount Parker (heir to the Earl of Macclesfield) and Sir Edward Turner. The other major local grandees, the Duke of Marlborough and Earl Harcourt, joined Macclesfield in backing the two Whigs, while the Earl of Abingdon and Earl of Lichfield supported the two Tories.

A major player in the election was Lady Susanna Keck whose husband was an MP and they owned the manor of Great Tew. She was annoyed that the 1750 election had gone to the Whigs and she was determined that it should be righted in 1754. She set out to out manoeuver the opposition. Her house entertained guests and she was attacked in the popular press. She was said to be "the opposition" and it was said that she was the best candidate.

Both sides were said to have spent £20,000. Prime Minister Henry Pelham promised £7,000 of government funds towards the Whigs' expenses, while the Tories raised £8,000 by public subscription).

Many commemorative objects were produced. A pot inscribed "Wenman & Dashwood Forever. 1755" is in the Victoria and Albert Museum, and one inscribed "I say Wenman & Dashwood, friend. What say you?" is in the Ashmolean Museum. A glass inscribed "Hark Wenman & Dashwood Sr Watn & the old Interest forever." is in the Museum of London.

Edward Gibbon referred to the election in his Memoirs of My Life and Writings, saying: "A general election was now approaching: the great Oxfordshire contest already blazed with all the malevolence of party-zeal. Magdalen College was devoutly attached to the old interest! and the names of Wenman and Dashwood were more frequently pronounced, than those of Cicero and Chrysostom."

The Calendar (New Style) Act 1750 was one of the Tory issues in the election. Thomas Parker was the son of George Parker, 2nd Earl of Macclesfield, the astronomer who had chaired the committee stage of the bill in the House of Commons of Great Britain. Amongst the lampoons resulting was:

His [Parker's] fine moving Speeches are nothing but Froth;
Our Time he has alter'd and turn'd it about,
So he like Old Christmas shall too be turned out.
Tho' Lords and great Placemen do with him combine,
'Twill signify nothing when honest Men join;
Drink Wenman and Dashwood, and stand to the Tack,
We want no old Turner nor new Almanack.

It was suspected that Lady Susanna Keck might have been the author of some of the poems.

== Result ==
General Election 17 April 1754: Oxfordshire (2 seats)
Party	Candidate	Votes	%	±%
Tory	The 6th Viscount Wenman	2,033	25.88	N/A
Tory	Sir James Dashwood, Bt	2,014	25.64	N/A
Whig	Viscount Parker	1,919	24.43	N/A
Whig	Sir Edward Turner, Bt.	1,890	24.06	N/A
Turnout		7,856	N/A	N/A
Whig gain from Tory				
Whig gain from Tory				

The result was declared on 17 April 1754. Wenman and Dashwood were ahead in the count of votes, however the returning officer made a "double return" (declaring both pairs of candidates to be elected, leaving the House of Commons to make the decision), and both sides petitioned against the election of their opponents.

The Commons took months to reach its decision, examining the legitimacy of many of the individual votes; but since MPs almost invariably voted in such cases on partisan lines rather than on the merits of the case, the result was a foregone conclusion - the Commons had a Whig majority, and therefore the two Whig candidates were declared elected on 23 April 1755. As one of the Tories on the Committee, Sir William Meredith noted in a letter to the Duke of Portland:

Nor, to this hour, can either side tell which had the majority of legal votes, nor any Member of Parliament who voted in that question give any other reason for his vote but as he stood inclined for the old [Tory] or new [Whig] interest of Oxfordshire.

Lady Keck had said that the campaign might be the death of her and this proved to be the case. Six weeks after victory was declared by parliament, on 3 June 1755, Lady Keck died.

Both parties in Oxfordshire were united in their determination to avoid a repetition of such a contest, and managed to reach an amicable compromise before the next general election, the Duke of Marlborough in future to nominate one member and the local Tories the other. Oxfordshire did not see a contested election again until 1826.
