= Humours of an Election =

Painting series by William Hogarth

The Humours of an Election is a series of four oil paintings and later engravings by William Hogarth that illustrate the election of a member of parliament in Oxfordshire in 1754. The oil paintings were created in 1755. The first three paintings, An Election Entertainment, Canvassing for Votes and The Polling, demonstrate the corruption endemic in parliamentary elections in the 18th century, before the Great Reform Act. The last painting, Chairing the Member, shows the celebrations of the victorious Tory candidates and their supporters.

At this time each constituency elected two MPs, and there was a property qualification for voters, so only a minority of the male population was enfranchised. There was no secret ballot, so bribery and intimidation were rife. However, this traditional view has been questioned by recent historians who observed lively local political participation in this time.

The originals are held by Sir John Soane's Museum, London. The works were also reproduced as a series of prints.

== An Election Entertainment ==
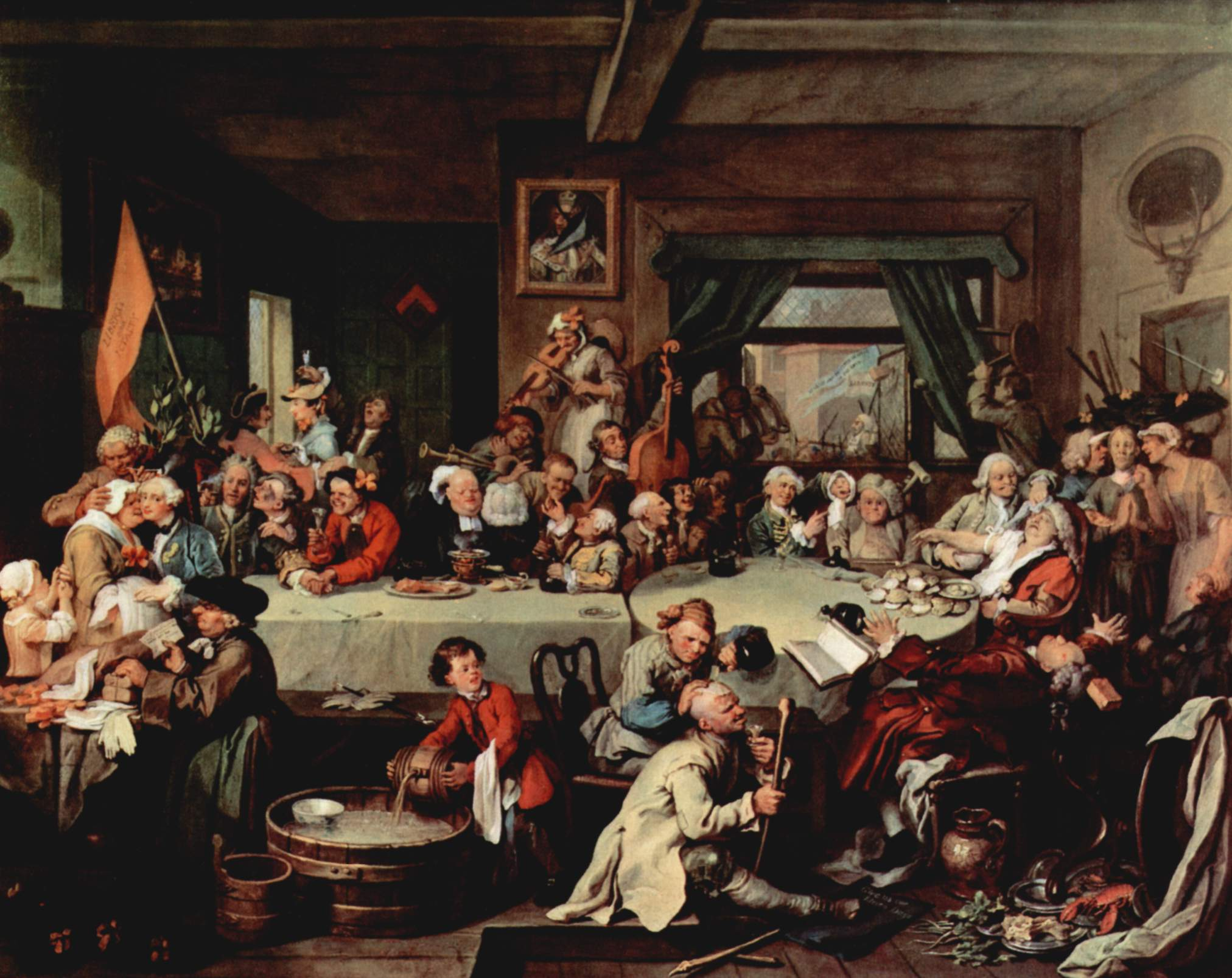
An Election Entertainment from The Humours of an Election series, 1755

The painting depicts a tavern dinner organised by the Whig candidates, while the Tories protest outside. The Tories are carrying an antisemitic caricature of a Jew, a reference to Jewish Naturalisation Act 1753 recently passed by the Whig government. A Tory banner containing the words "Give us our Eleven days", a protest against the Calendar (New Style) Act 1750, is on the tavern floor.

In the tavern the two Whig candidates are ingratiating themselves with supporters. One candidate is kissing a conventionally unattractive woman, while a girl tries to steal his ring; the other is listening to a drunken bore. At the other end of the table the mayor is collapsing from over indulgence in oysters, while the election agent is knocked out by a brick thrown through the window by the Tory mob. Other supporters throw furniture at the Tories. An Orange banner containing the words "Liberty and Loyalty" stands in the corner, while outside the window the Tories carry a banner with the word "Liberty". In an engraved version of the image, the words "and Property" have been appended [below "Liberty"]; the words "Marry and multiply in spite of the Devil" (referring to the Clandestine Marriages Act 1753) have been added to the second banner. (Note: Another version extends the slogan on the second banner to say "Marry and multiply in spite of the Devil and the ____" (the Court).)

In the foreground a maimed soldier sits on the floor whilst a patron pours gin into his head wound.

Sir John Parnell, 1st Baronet is seen seated below the window, using his hand and a napkin as a puppet.

The composition of the scene parodies traditional images of the Last Supper and other Biblical feasts.

== Canvassing for Votes ==
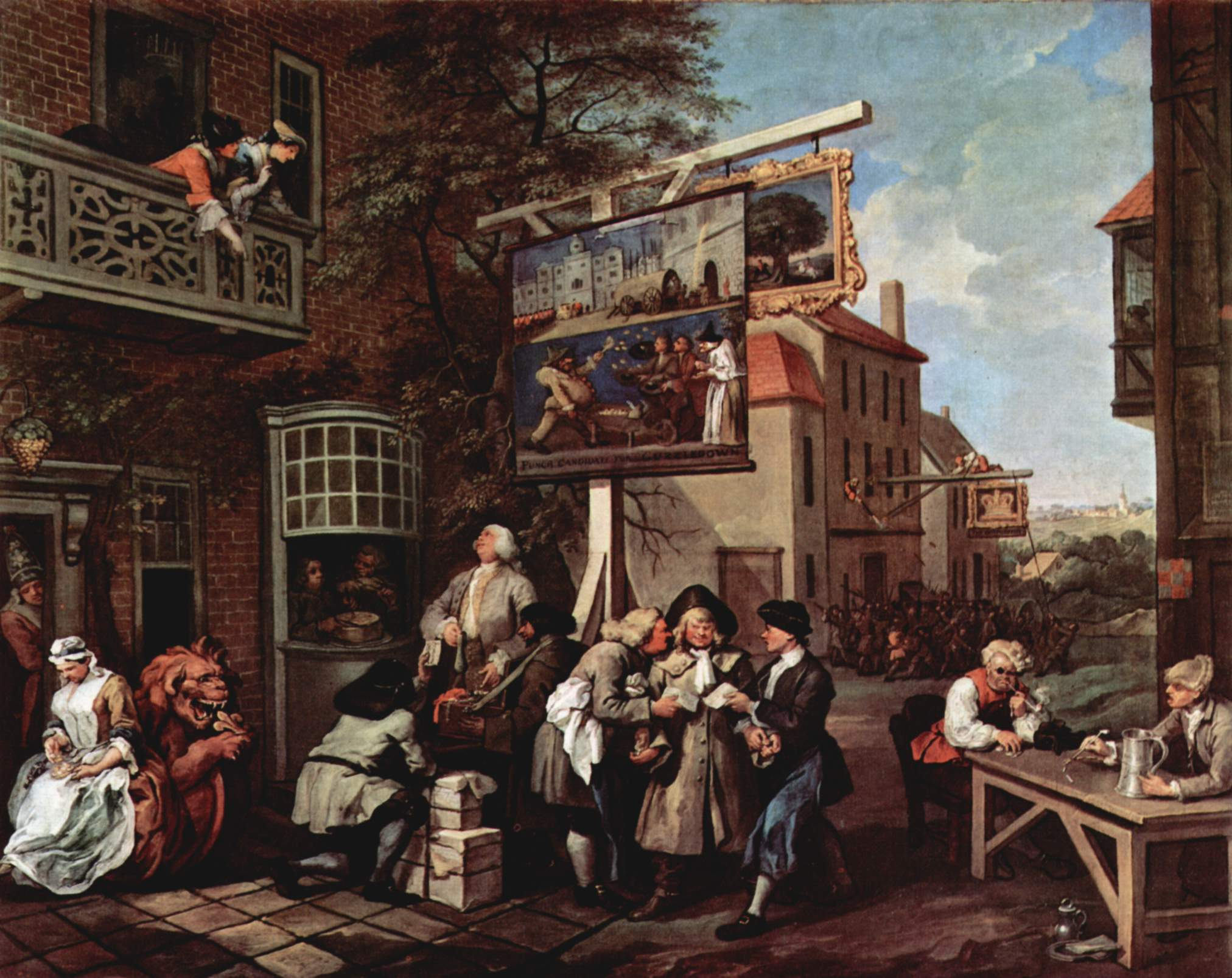
Canvassing for Votes from The Humours of an Election series, 1755

This scene depicts Tory and Whig agents, both attempting to bribe an innkeeper to vote for them. The crowd outside the tavern is visible in the background. In a reference to the antisemitism of the crowd behind, a Jewish peddler is being employed by another agent who is offering jewels and ribbons to the wives of voters.

On the margins of the composition a soldier (left) and two old sailors (right) represent uncorrupted patriotism. The soldier peeps out from behind a now-impotently decorative figurehead depicting the British lion devouring the French fleur-de-lis. A woman sits on it looking at her bribes. The sailors on the right are re-enacting a naval victory using pieces of broken clay pipe.

== The Polling ==
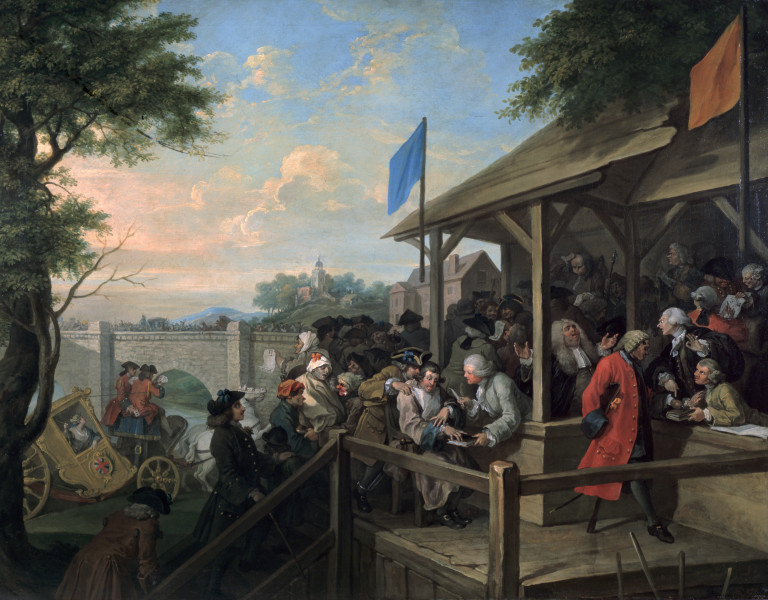
The Polling from The Humours of an Election series, 1755

Voters are shown declaring their support for the Whigs (orange) or Tories (blue). Agents from both sides are using unscrupulous tactics to increase their votes or challenge opposing voters. A Whig voter with a hook instead of his amputated hand is being challenged because he is placing his hook, rather than his hand, as legally prescribed, on the book as he swears to his voter identity.

Meanwhile, the Tories are bringing a mentally disabled man to vote. A dying man is being carried in behind him. In the background a woman in a carriage with a broken axle stands for Britannia. Her coachmen are gambling, ignoring the fact that the carriage is broken.

== Chairing the Member ==
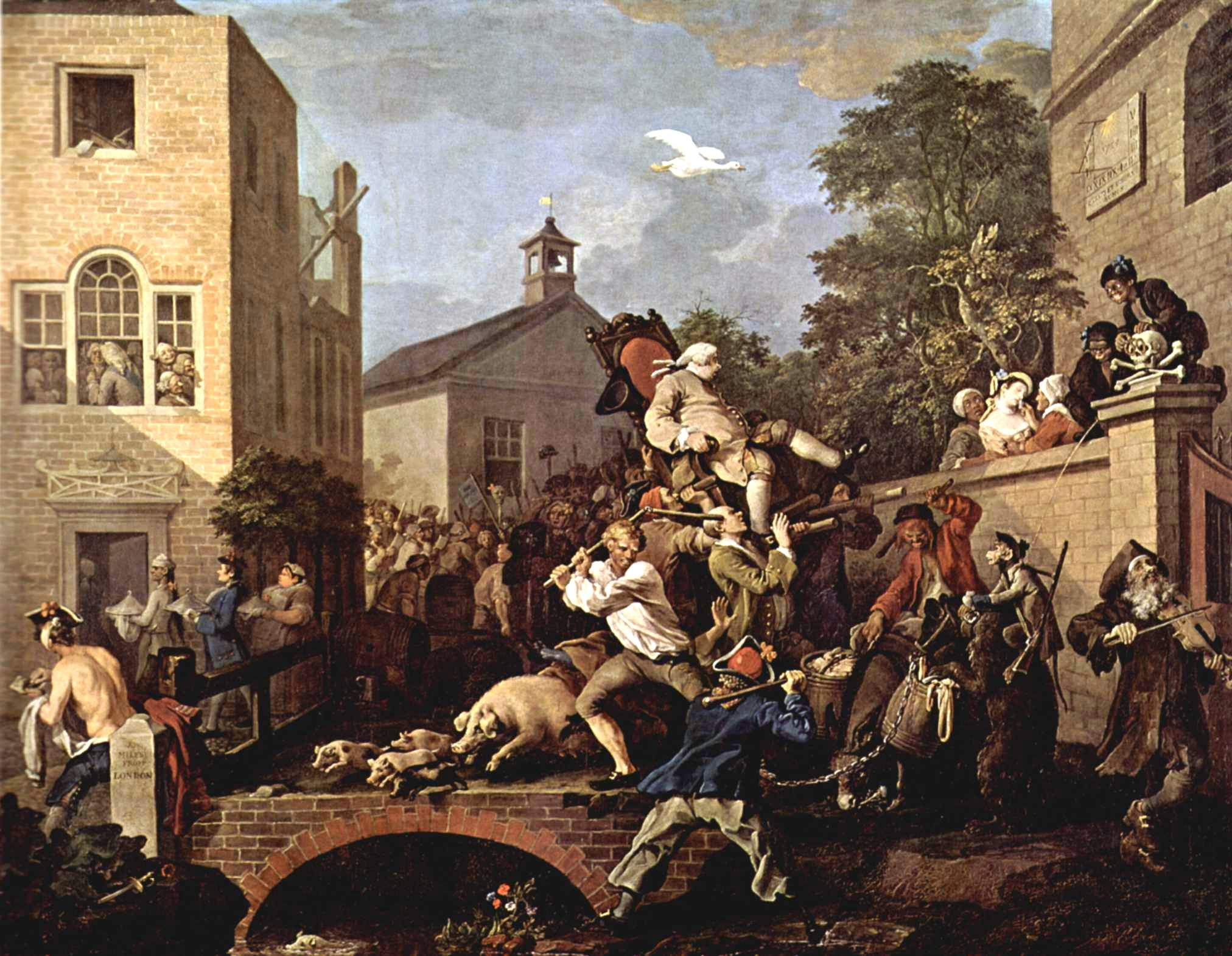
Chairing the Member, from The Humours of an Election series, 1755

One of the victorious Tory candidates is being carried through the streets on a chair in a traditional ceremony. He is about to tumble down because one of his carriers has just been accidentally hit on the head by a flail carried by a Tory-supporting rural labourer who is attempting to fight off a Whig supporter (an old sailor with a bear). The Whig supporters can be seen wearing orange cockades.

A group of frightened pigs run across the scene in a reference to the story of the Gadarene swine. The Whig leaders watch from a nearby house. At the right two young chimney sweeps urinate on the bear. A black Briton, somewhat aghast, holds her passed-out mistress who is being given smelling salts by another attendant.

== See also ==
- List of works by William Hogarth
