= William Morgan (of Tredegar, elder) =

British politician

Sir William Morgan KB
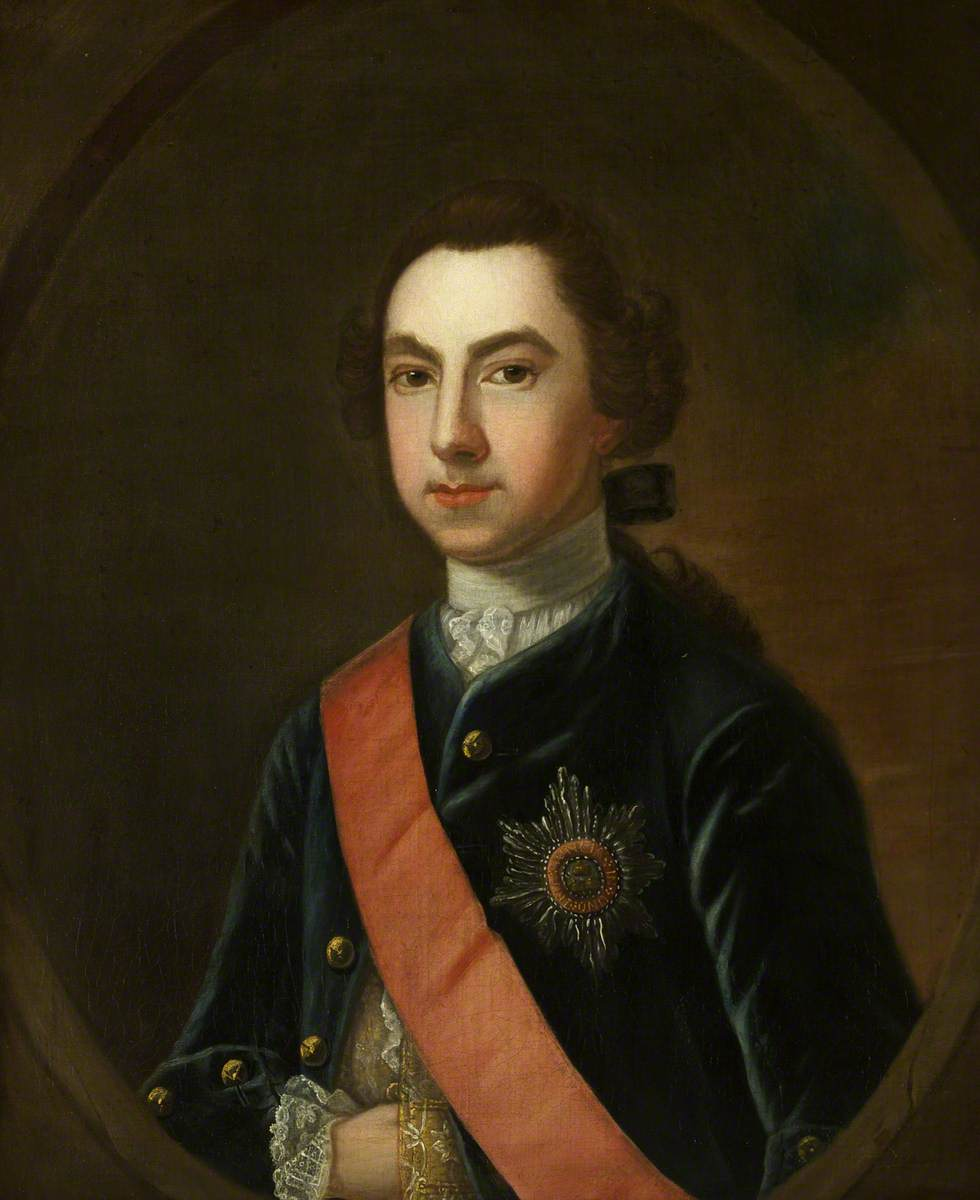
- Born: 8 March 1700
- Died: 24 April 1731 (aged 31)
- Spouse: Lady Rachel Cavendish
- Children: William Morgan (of Tredegar, younger)
- Father: John Morgan

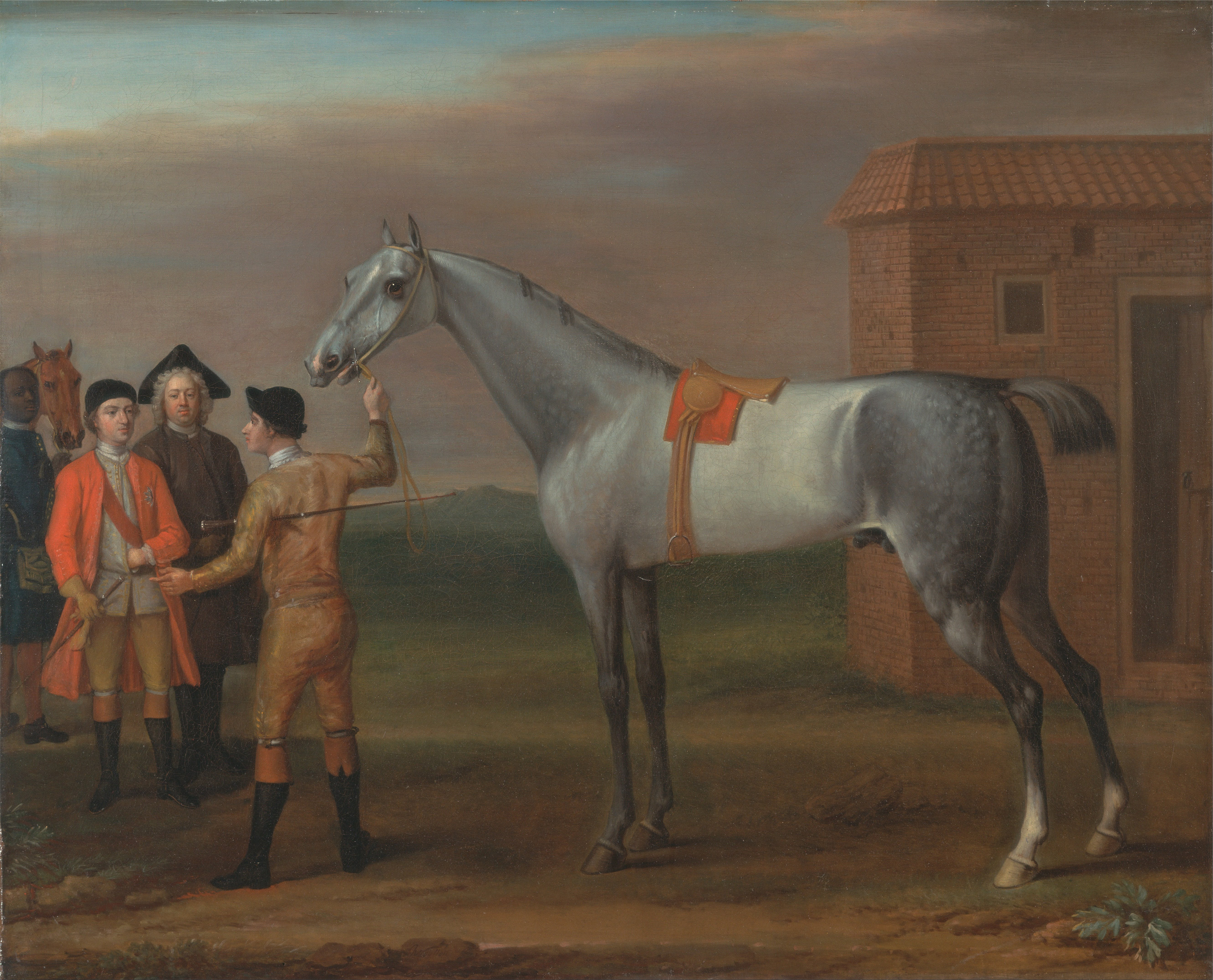
Morgan with his horse Lamprey and a Black servant at the Newmarket Racecourse

Sir William Morgan, KB (8 March 1700 – 24 April 1731) was a British Whig politician of the early 18th century. Morgan was the eldest son of John Morgan, a Whig of great political influence in Brecknockshire and Monmouthshire. He inherited the Tredegar Estate from his father in 1720, and in 1722, entered the House of Commons, being returned for both Brecon and Monmouthshire and choosing to sit for the latter. He was also, like his father, appointed Lord Lieutenant of Brecknockshire and Lord Lieutenant and custos of Monmouthshire in 1720, and also became custos of Brecknockshire in 1723.

Morgan was also one of the Founder Knights of the Order of the Bath upon its revival in 1725. Around 1724, he married Lady Rachel Cavendish (d. 1780), the daughter of William Cavendish, 2nd Duke of Devonshire. He was appointed Steward of the King's Lordship of Penkelly, and died at Tredegar in 1731. He left his Tredegar estate to his eldest son William. He was known for his courtesy and benevolence and his extravagant manner of living.

Parliament of Great Britain
Preceded by Roger Jones	Member of Parliament for Brecon; 1722–1723	Succeeded by Thomas Morgan
Preceded by Thomas Lewis; John Hanbury	Member of Parliament for Monmouthshire; 1722–1731; With: John Hanbury	Succeeded by John Hanbury; Lord Charles Somerset
Honorary titles
Preceded by John Morgan	Lord Lieutenant of Brecknockshire and Monmouthshire; 1720–1731	Succeeded by Thomas Morgan
Preceded by The Lord Ashburnham	Custos Rotulorum of Brecknockshire; 1723–1731	Succeeded by Thomas Morgan
