= Susanna Keck =

Political manager (bap. 1706, d. 1755)

Lady Susanna Keck
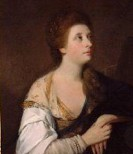
- from painting
- Known for: political manoevering
- Born: Susanna Hamilton bap. 26 September 1706
- Died: 1755 (aged approx. 49)
- Spouse: Anthony Keck MP
- Issue: two daughters
- Father: James Hamilton, 4th Duke of Hamilton
- Mother: Elizabeth Gerard

Lady Susanna Keck (née Lady Susan Hamilton; bap. 26 September 1706 – 1755) was a British political manager. She sided with the Whigs and she took a strong interest in the 1754 general election in Oxfordshire.

== Life ==
Keck was baptised in 1706. Her parents were Hon. Elizabeth Gerard (only daughter and heiress of Digby Gerard, 5th Baron Gerard), and James Hamilton, 4th Duke of Hamilton.

Keck was a strong supporter of the Whigs. She regarded the Whigs' opposition as "Jacobites in disguise". She had a forthright approach, and she was known for being eloquent but she was not regarded as a beauty. She was said to have inherited her intelligence from her mother and her political nous from seeing the self-seeking politics of other members of her family. She was educated by governesses and she had a quick wit, but barely legible handwriting.

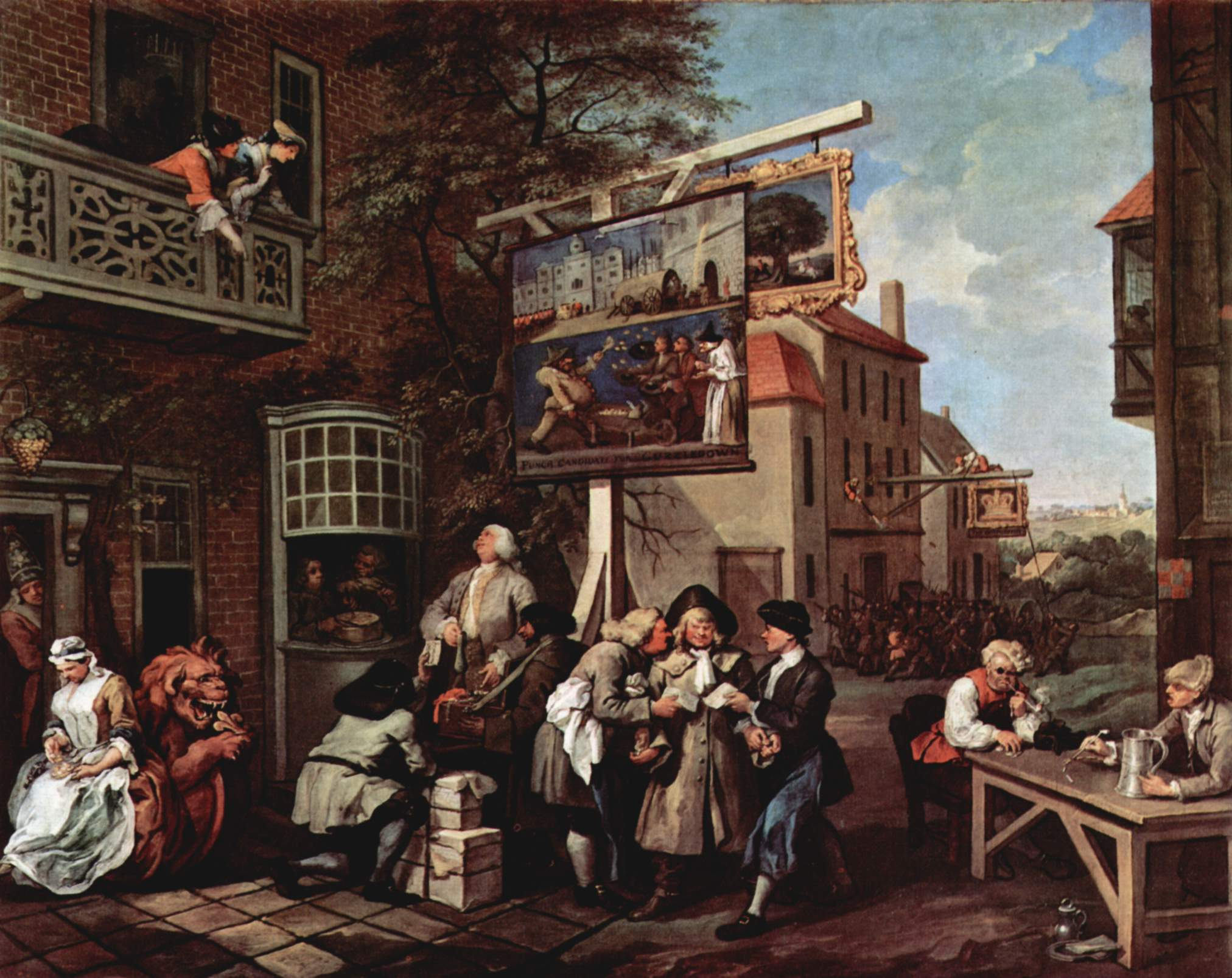
Canvassing for Votes from The Humours of an Election inspired by the 1754 Oxford election

Lady Keck was a major player in the 1754 general election in Oxfordshire. which was strongly fought, violent, and very expensive. It was seen as a transition as the populace turned towards the press as a source of information. She was a major player in the election even though it was her husband who was an MP. She was annoyed that the 1750 election had gone to the Whigs and she was determined that it should be righted in 1754. She set out to out-manoeuver the opposition. Her house entertained guests and she was attacked by the popular press. She was said to be "the opposition" and it was said that "Lady S" was the best candidate.

Both sides were said to have spent £20,000. Commemorative objects were produced. A pot inscribed "Wenman & Dashwood Forever. 1755" is in the Victoria and Albert Museum, and one inscribed "I say Wenman & Dashwood, friend. What say you?" is in the Ashmolean Museum.

It was suspected that Keck might have been the author of some of the poems. She had said that the campaign might be the death of her and this seemed to be the case. Six weeks after victory was finally declared by Parliament for the ruling party, on 3 June 1755, Lady Susanna Keck died.

== Personal life ==
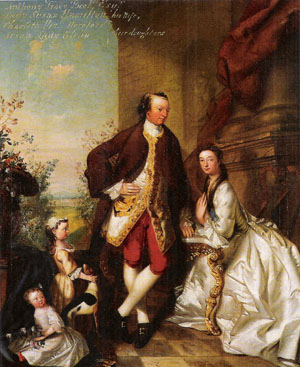
Anthony and Susanna Keck and their family

She married beneath her in 1736 to Anthony Keck who was an uninterested member of Parliament. Keck had been born Anthony Tracy but he had taken the name of Keck as a condition of receiving an inheritance from his great-uncle. As a result, he had the manor of Great Tew, Oxfordshire. He was interested in breeding racehorses.

Together, they had two daughters:

- Henrietta Charlotte Tracy (1740/1–1817), who married Edward Devereux, 12th Viscount Hereford in 1774.
- Susan Tracy (d. 1835), married Francis Charteris, Lord Elcho, a grandson of James Wemyss, 5th Earl of Wemyss, in 1771.

Her husband was a keen participant in gambling and horse racing; he died at the Epsom races in 1767 when his horse won a race.
