= Custos Rotulorum of Brecknockshire =

This is a list of people who have served as Custos Rotulorum of Brecknockshire.

- Sir William Vaughan c. 1544
- Sir Roger Vaughan bef. 1558–1571
- Richard Price bef. 1573–1586/1587
- Sir Robert Knollys bef. 1594 – aft. 1608
- Sir Henry Williams 1617–1636
- Henry Williams 1636–1642
- Howell Gwynne 1642–1646
- Interregnum
- Sir William Lewis, Bt 1660–1677
- Sir Thomas Williams, Bt 1677–1679
- The Duke of Beaufort 1679–1689
- Sir Rowland Gwynne 1689
- The Earl of Macclesfield 1689–1694
- The Lord Herbert of Chirbury 1695–1702
- The Lord Ashburnham 1702–1710
- The Lord Ashburnham 1710
- The Lord Ashburnham 1710–1723
- William Morgan 1723–1731

For later custodes rotulorum, see Lord Lieutenant of Brecknockshire.
