= Richmond House, Twickenham =

Former mansion in Twickenham, England

Coordinates: 51.44576°N 0.32824°W

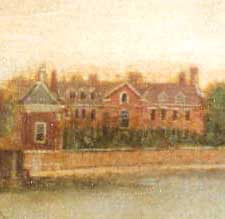
Richmond House in 1725

Richmond House was a large mansion in Twickenham, Surrey, England.

== History ==
The house was built in about 1640 for Edward Birkhead, who was Serjeant at Arms of the British House of Commons. The house was acquired by Francis Newport, 1st Earl of Bradford in 1682: he built up an important art collection which is now at Weston Park in Staffordshire. It then passed to one of his sons, Thomas Newport, 1st Baron Torrington, in 1708 and to Anthony Browne, 6th Viscount Montagu in 1736. From 1744 to 1766 it was owned and occupied by Anthony Keck.

The house was then bought by Mary, Dowager Countess of Shelburne (mother of the William Petty, 1st Marquess of Lansdowne, who served as Prime Minister) in 1766. It then passed to Martha Bruce, Countess of Elgin and Kincardine (mother of Thomas Bruce, 7th Earl of Elgin, who installed the Elgin Marbles in the British Museum) in 1810. It then was acquired by Sir Claude Champion de Crespigny, 1st Baronet in 1813 and by Mrs Anne Seymour Damer (a sculptor and close friend of Horace Walpole), in 1816.

The house was finally purchased by Field Marshal Sir Edward Blakeney in 1850 and, after passing down his family, was demolished in 1924.
