= Anthony Keck (Woodstock MP) =

English politician

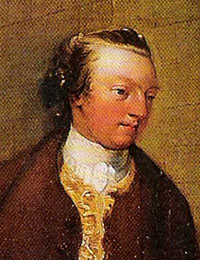

Member of Parliament for Woodstock
- In office 1753–1767 Serving with Viscount Bateman
- Preceded by: Viscount Bateman; Hon. John Trevor
- Succeeded by: Viscount Bateman; Hon. William Gordon

Personal details
- Born: Anthony Tracy; 1708
- Died: 29 May 1767 (aged 58–59)
- Spouse: Lady Susan Hamilton (after 1736)
- Children: 2
- Parent: John Tracy

Anthony Keck (born Tracy; 1708 – 29 May 1767) was an English politician.

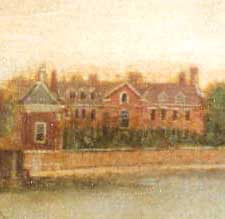
Richmond House in 1725

== Early life ==
He was born the second son of John Tracy of Stanway House, Gloucestershire and Anne (née Atkins) Tracy.

His mother was the only daughter of Sir Robert Atkins of Saperton, Chief Baron of the Exchequer. His father was the only surviving son of Hon. Ferdinando Tracy (third son of John Tracy, 3rd Viscount Tracy) and Catherine Keck (eldest daughter of Sir Anthony Keck MP and Commissioner of the Great Seal).

== Career ==
He succeeded to the Keck estates at Great Tew in Oxfordshire of his great-uncle Francis Keck in 1729, adopting the name of Keck according to a condition of the bequest. From 1744 he lived at Richmond House in Twickenham.

A protégé of the Duke of Marlborough, he was a Member of Parliament (MP) for Woodstock from 1753 to 1767.

== Personal life ==
He had married well in 1736 to Lady Susan Hamilton (1706–1753), the daughter of James Hamilton, 4th Duke of Hamilton and Hon. Elizabeth Gerard (only daughter and heiress of Digby Gerard, 5th Baron Gerard). Together, they had two daughters:

- Henrietta Charlotte Tracy (1740/1–1817), who married Edward Devereux, 12th Viscount Hereford in 1774.
- Susan Tracy (d. 1835), who married Francis Charteris, Lord Elcho, a grandson of James Wemyss, 5th Earl of Wemyss, in 1771.

A keen participant in horse racing, he died of apoplexy at Epsom races in 1767 when his horse won a race.

Parliament of Great Britain
Preceded by Viscount Bateman; Hon. John Trevor	Member of Parliament for Woodstock; 1753 – 1767; With: Viscount Bateman	Succeeded by Viscount Bateman; Hon. William Gordon
