= Edward Devereux, 12th Viscount Hereford =

English hereditary peer

Edward Devereux, 12th Viscount Hereford (19 February 1741 – 1 August 1783) was an English hereditary peer who sat in the House of Lords as Premier Viscount. He was Colonel of the Montgomeryshire Militia from 1764 to 1778.

== Family ==
He was the son of Edward Devereux, 11th Viscount Hereford and his wife Catherine Mytton (d. 1748).

Keck's Name Act 1774
- Act of Parliament
- Parliament of Great Britain
- Long title: An Act to enable the Honourable Henrietta Charlotte Keck Spinster, and her Issue, to take, use, and bear, the Surname and Arms of Tracy, pursuant to the Will of Robert Tracy Esquire, deceased.
- Citation: 14 Geo. 3. c. 38 Pr.
- Territorial extent: Great Britain

Dates
- Royal assent: 31 March 1774
- Commencement: 13 January 1774 (Note: Start of session.)

Status: Current legislation

Lord Hereford married Henrietta‌‌‌‌ ‌‌‌‌Charlotte‌‌‌‌ Tracy (d. 1817), the daughter of Susan and Anthony Keck. Henrietta was born Henrietta Charlotte Keck, but changed her surname by a private act of Parliament, Keck's Name Act 1774 (14 Geo. 3. c. 38 Pr.), to Tracy in 1774 — before her marriage — as a condition of inheriting her uncle Robert Tracy's estate. Edward and Henrietta had no children and the Viscountcy was inherited by Edward's younger brother George Devereux.

== See also ==
- House of Lords

== Notes ==
Peerage of England
Preceded by Edward Devereux	Viscount Hereford; 1760–1783	Succeeded by George Devereux
