= Henry Devereux, 14th Viscount Hereford =

British Tory politician

The Right Honourable The Viscount Hereford PC
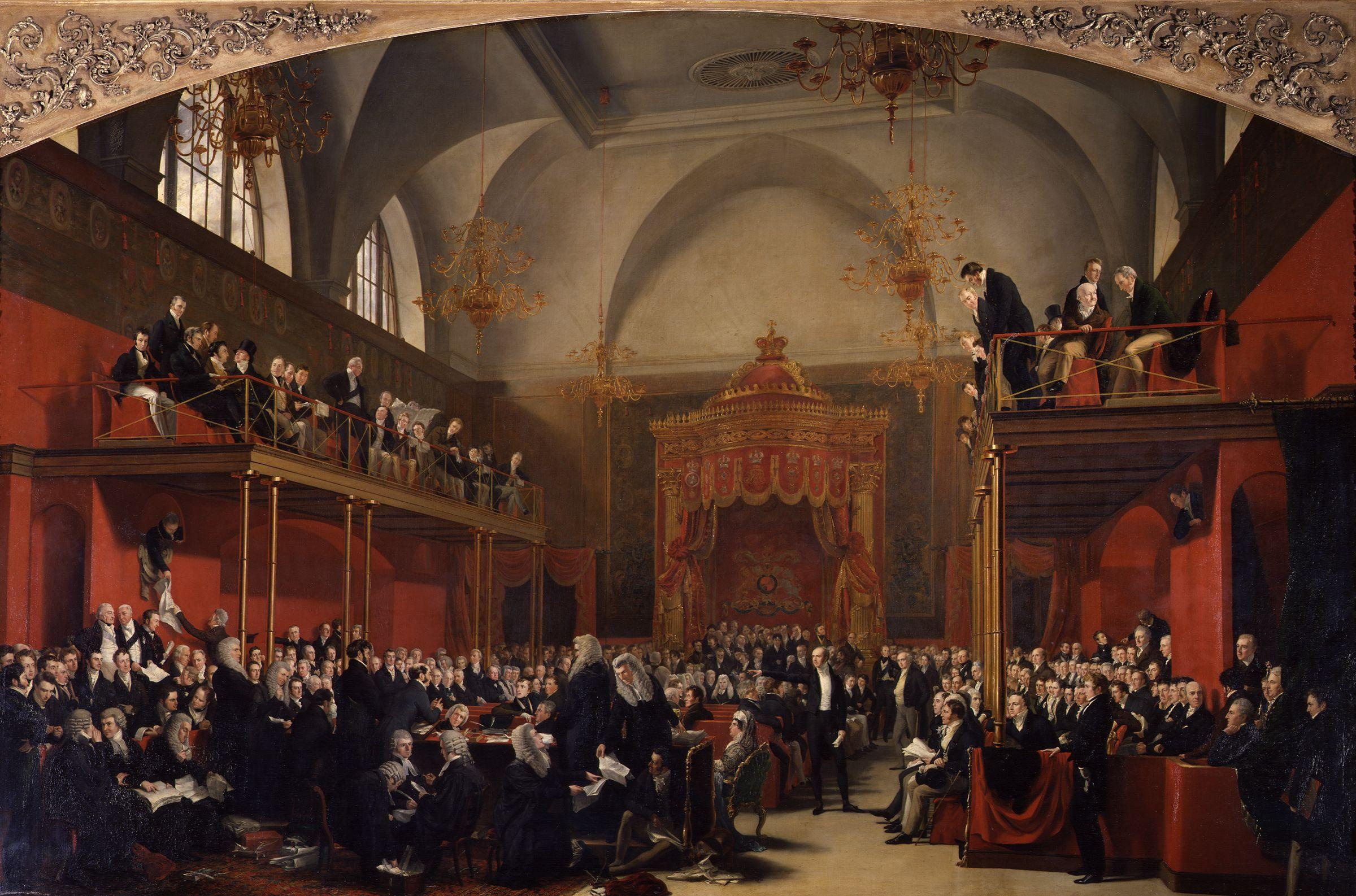
- Lord Hereford in The Trial of Queen Caroline (1820)

Captain of the Honourable Corps of Gentlemen-at-Arms
- In office 1827 – 24 November 1830
- Monarchs: George IV; William IV
- Prime Minister: The Viscount Goderich; The Duke of Wellington
- Preceded by: The Earl of Courtown
- Succeeded by: The 3rd Lord Foley
- In office 29 December 1834 – 8 April 1835
- Monarch: William IV
- Prime Minister: Sir Robert Peel, Bt
- Preceded by: The 4th Lord Foley
- Succeeded by: The 4th Lord Foley

Personal details
- Born: 9 February 1777 Powys, Wales
- Died: 31 May 1843 (aged 66) Honfleur, Calvados, France
- Party: Tory
- Spouse(s): Frances Cornewall (d. 1864)
- Education: Trinity College, Oxford

Henry Fleming Lea Devereux, 14th Viscount Hereford PC (9 February 1777 – 31 May 1843) was a British Tory peer and politician. He served as Captain of the Honourable Corps of Gentlemen-at-Arms between 1827 and 1830 and again between 1834 and 1835.

== Background and education ==
Devereux was the son of George Devereux, 13th Viscount Hereford, and Marianna Devereux. His maternal grandfather was George Deveraux, of Tregoyd, a distant relation to the line of his father. He was educated at Winchester and Trinity College, Oxford.

== Political career ==
Devereux succeeded his father in the viscountcy in 1804 and took his seat on the Tory benches in the House of Lords. In 1827 he was appointed Captain of the Honourable Band of Gentlemen Pensioners under Lord Goderich, a post he held until 1830, the last two years under the premiership of the Duke of Wellington. He held the same office (in 1834 renamed Captain of the Honourable Corps of Gentlemen-at-Arms) from 1834 to 1835 under Sir Robert Peel. In 1830 he was admitted to the Privy Council.

== Family ==
Lord Hereford married Frances Elizabeth Cornewall, daughter of Sir George Cornewall, 2nd Baronet and Catherine Cornewall, on 12 December 1805. They had six children:

- Hon. Henry Cornewall Devereux (21 November 1807 – 14 September 1839), died unmarried
- Robert Devereux, 15th Viscount Hereford (3 May 1809 – 18 August 1855), succeeded his father
- Rear-Admiral Hon. Walter Bourchier Devereux (3 November 1810 – 15 May 1868), married in 1856 Adelaide Ellinore Hughes, daughter of Hugh Robert Hughes of Bache Hall, niece of 1st Baron Dinorben
- Hon. Humphrey Bohun Devereux (29 June 1812 – 19 May 1880), a Deputy Lieutenant of Herefordshire. He married Caroline Antrobus, daughter of Sir Edmund Antrobus, 2nd Baronet. The marriage was childless.
- Hon. Frances Catherine Devereux (19 May 1814 – 12 January 1857), maid of honour to Queen Victoria; married Thomas Joseph Bradshaw, a barrister
- Major-General Hon. George Talbot Devereux (12 January 1818 – 14 February 1898), married firstly in 1846, Flora Mary MacDonald, mother of Arthur Annesley, 11th Viscount Valentia from a previous marriage; married secondly in 1897 Katherine Jane Windham, daughter of Ashe Windham of Waghen Hall

After a two-year illness, Lord Hereford died in May 1843, aged 67, at his home in Honfleur, Calvados, France. He was succeeded in the viscountcy by his eldest surviving son, Robert. The Viscountess Hereford died in February 1864.

Political offices
Preceded by The Earl of Courtown	Captain of the Honourable Band of Gentlemen Pensioners; 1827–1830	Succeeded by The 3rd Lord Foley
Preceded by The 4th Lord Foley	Captain of the Honourable Corps of Gentlemen-at-Arms; 1834–1835	Succeeded by The 4th Lord Foley
Peerage of England
Preceded by George Devereux	Viscount Hereford; 1804–1843	Succeeded by Robert Devereux
