= Great Catherine (film) =

1968 British film by Gordon Flemyng

- Belgian theatrical poster
- Directed by: Gordon Flemyng
- Written by: Hugh Leonard
- Based on: Great Catherine by George Bernard Shaw
- Produced by: Jules Buck
- Starring: Peter O'Toole; Zero Mostel; Jeanne Moreau; Jack Hawkins; Akim Tamiroff
- Cinematography: Oswald Morris
- Edited by: Anne V. Coates
- Music by: Dimitri Tiomkin
- Production company: Keep Films
- Distributed by: Warner-Pathé Distributors
- Release date: 6 December 1968
- Running time: 99 minutes
- Country: United Kingdom
- Language: English

Great Catherine is a 1968 British comedy film directed by Gordon Flemyng and starring Peter O'Toole, Zero Mostel, Jeanne Moreau and Jack Hawkins. It was written by Hugh Leonard based on the 1913 one act play Great Catherine: Whom Glory Still Adores by George Bernard Shaw, loosely based on the story of Sir Charles Hanbury Williams and his time spent as an envoy at the Russian court.

== Synopsis ==
A British officer, Captain Charles Edstaston, is sent to the Russian court of Catherine the Great as an envoy, where he has to contend with the crafty machinations of her chief minister Potemkin.

== Cast ==
- Peter O'Toole as Charles Edstaston
- Jeanne Moreau as Catherine the Great
- Zero Mostel as Potemkin
- Jack Hawkins as British Ambassador
- Akim Tamiroff as Sergeant
- Marie Lohr as Dowager Lady Gorse
- Kate O'Mara as Varinka
- Angela Scoular as Claire
- Oliver MacGreevy as General Pyskov
- James Mellor as Colonel Pugachov
- Lea Seidl as Grand Duchess
- Claire Gordon as Elizabeth Vokonska
- Declan Mulholland as Count Tokhtamysh
- Janet Kelly as Anna Schuvalova
- Henry Woolf as Egrebyomka

== Production ==
It was shot at Shepperton Studios near London with sets designed by the art directors John Bryan and William Hutchinson. The score was composed by Dimitri Tiomkin.

== Critical reception ==
The Monthly Film Bulletin wrote: "Shaw's frivolous little playlet probably depended for its effect on its brevity, which we are told is the soul of wit. By expanding it into a full-length screenplay Hugh Leonard has spread the wit very thin, and Gordon Flemyng has smothered what was left of it in an elaborately designed and decorated production more suited to a wide screen epic than to this thin little joke. Sets and costumes are beautifully executed in restrained and tasteful colour, but they can only briefly distract attention from the disastrous heaviness of the direction, which lets each feeble gag run twice its bearable length, or the extraordinary mixture of acting styles, ranging from slapstick through Restoration comedy to Carry On camp. Best not to particularise perhaps, but simply to hope that all this talent will not be wasted again on something so flimsy."

In The Radio Times Guide to Films Adrian Turner gave the film 1/5 stars, writing: "This farrago about the romantic life of the Empress of Russia is more like a Carry On movie transferred to St Petersburg. Peter O'Toole breezes through it all as an English Light Dragoons captain who finds himself in the Empress's bedchamber, while art house heroine Jeanne Moreau is hopelessly miscast as Catherine. The flashy, tricksy direction roots the film in the Swinging Sixties."

TV Guide wrote, "They waited 55 years to make it (Shaw's play) into a film and would have been well advised to wait another 55 years. What a mishmash!...Mostel, unless held in check, always overacts, and this is a prime example of a stage actor, accustomed to having to play "big" for the people in the last row, overdoing things for the close-up camera."

The New York Times wrote, "GREAT CATHERINE has a great clown named Zero Mostel...the glorious hamming of the portly American makes the picture ... Surely Mr. Mostel's antics would have won the playwright's approval ... The story, braced immeasurably by the Shavian lines, as arranged by the scenarist, Hugh Leonard, and stylishly piloted by the director, Gordon Flemyng, the picture is also beautiful in its lavish décor, costumes and color photography."

Leslie Halliwell wrote "Chaos results from the attempt to inflate an ill-considered Shavian whimsy into a feature film: the material is simply insufficient and the performances flounder in irrelevant production values."
