= Great Catherine: Whom Glory Still Adores =

One-act 1913 play by George Bernard Shaw

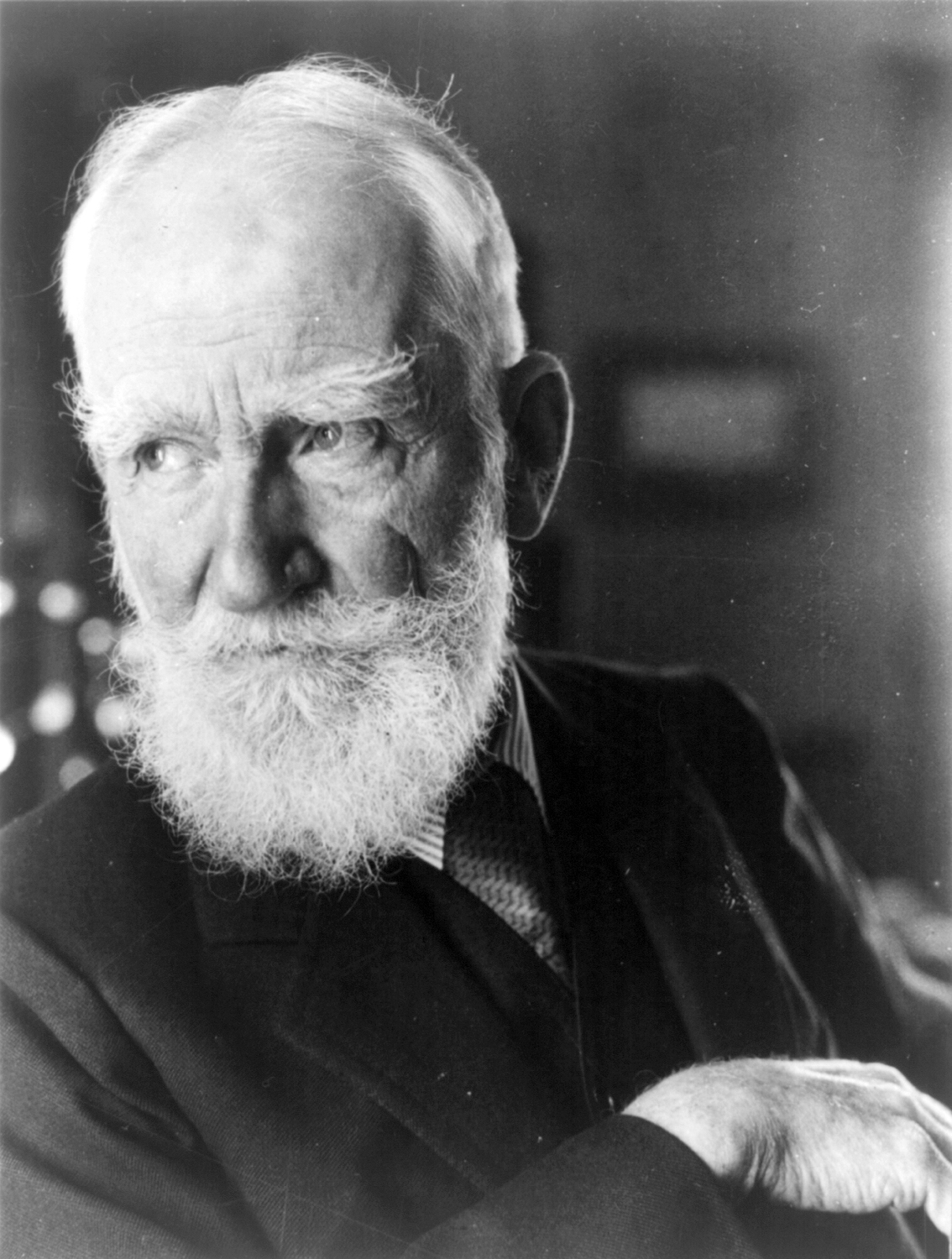
- Written by: George Bernard Shaw
- Original language: English
- Genre: Comedy
- Setting: Imperial Russia

Premiere
- Date premiered: 1913

Great Catherine: Whom Glory Still Adores is a 1913 one-act play by Irish dramatist George Bernard Shaw. It was written between two of his other 1913 plays, Pygmalion and The Music Cure. It tells the story of a prim British visitor to the court of the sexually uninhibited Catherine the Great of Russia.

== Plot ==
The plot focuses on Captain Charles Edstaston, a very prim and proper British military attaché who, in 1776, is assigned to the Imperial Russian court in Saint Petersburg, during the 34-year (1762–1796) rule of Empress Catherine the Great, and brings his equally prim fiancée, Claire, with him. In the midst of court intrigue and palace politics, primarily instigated by Catherine's favored statesman and military leader, the drunken, ill-mannered, but crafty Prince Patiomkin, the imperiously commanding, yet concurrently, voraciously intimate Catherine toys with the naive arrival, questioning his rigid beliefs, leading him to drop his guarded mannerisms and, in the process, she also learns certain philosophical truths.

== Productions ==
Written for the popular actress-manager and artist Gertrude Kingston, Great Catherine premiered on 18 November 1913 at London's West End performance space, Vaudeville Theatre, paired with the one-act Hermon Ould play Before Sunset, and enjoyed a 30-performance engagement. Among other cast members were Edmund Breon as Edstaston and Norman McKinnel as Patiomkin.

In 1916, three years after its London production, while the UK was in the midst of the Great War, Gertrude Kingston and her British acting ensemble, A Visiting Company, toured the United States, staging New York City's Broadway premiere of Great Catherine in repertory with another one-act Shaw play, The Inca of Perusalem: An Almost Historical Comedietta, and Lord Dunsany's one-act fantastic drama of ancient Egypt, The Queen's Enemies, which included, among its cast members, twenty-nine-year-old future director George Abbott. The productions ran at the Neighborhood Playhouse and Maxine Elliott's Theatre for 42 performances, from 14 November to 30 December. Twenty years later, in May 1936, the Works Progress Administration's Federal Theatre Project presented the One-Act Experimental Theatre in a three-performance cycle of three one-act plays, with the second work written by Molière and the third by Emjo Basshe.

=== TV and film ===
During the early years of TV broadcasting, an era referenced in the U.S. as the Golden Age of Television, there were at least three transmissions of Great Catherine. The first, a live staging for NBC in May 1948, was directed by TV pioneer Fred Coe and starred, in her TV debut, Gertrude Lawrence as Catherine and Micheál MacLiammóir as Patiomkin. A British live TV exhibition in April 1953 starred Mary Ellis as Catherine and Frederick Valk as Patiomkin. Five years later, another live UK presentation was directed by Barry Morse, an acting and directorial mainstay of early Canadian television, and starred his wife, Sydney Sturgess as Catherine. In 1968, as cinematic productions eschewed constraints of film censorship, the release of a 99-minute British film version, Great Catherine, with expanded plot and character development, as well as sexually charged situations and dialogue, directed by Gordon Flemyng and starring Peter O'Toole as Captain Edstaston, Zero Mostel as Patiomkin and Jeanne Moreau as Catherine, was judged by most critics to be unsatisfactory.
