= Capel Hanbury =

Anglo-Welsh businessman and politician (1707–1765)

- Born: 1707
- Died: 1765 (aged 57–58)

Capel Hanbury (1707–1765) was an Anglo-Welsh businessman and Whig politician.

== Life ==
He was the third son of John Hanbury of Pontypool, an ironmaster, and his second wife Bridget Ayscough, daughter of Sir Edward Ayscough; and brother of Charles Hanbury Williams. He matriculated at Christ Church, Oxford in 1723. On his father's death in 1734, he inherited the family ironworks.

In politics the Hanburys were Whigs, and allies of the Monmouthshire Morgan family. Capel Hanbury at the end of his life was a Rockingham Whig. He first became a Member of Parliament for Leominster in 1741, on the basis of a connection with Lady Coningsby. He took over from his brother Charles in Monmouthshire in 1747, holding the seat to his death in 1765.

== Family ==
Hanbury married Jane Tracy, daughter of Thomas Charles Tracy, 5th Viscount Tracy. They had one son, John Hanbury, and two daughters Henrietta and Frances who died unmarried.
