= Richard Gorges (Leominster MP) =

British Member of Parliament (1730–1780)

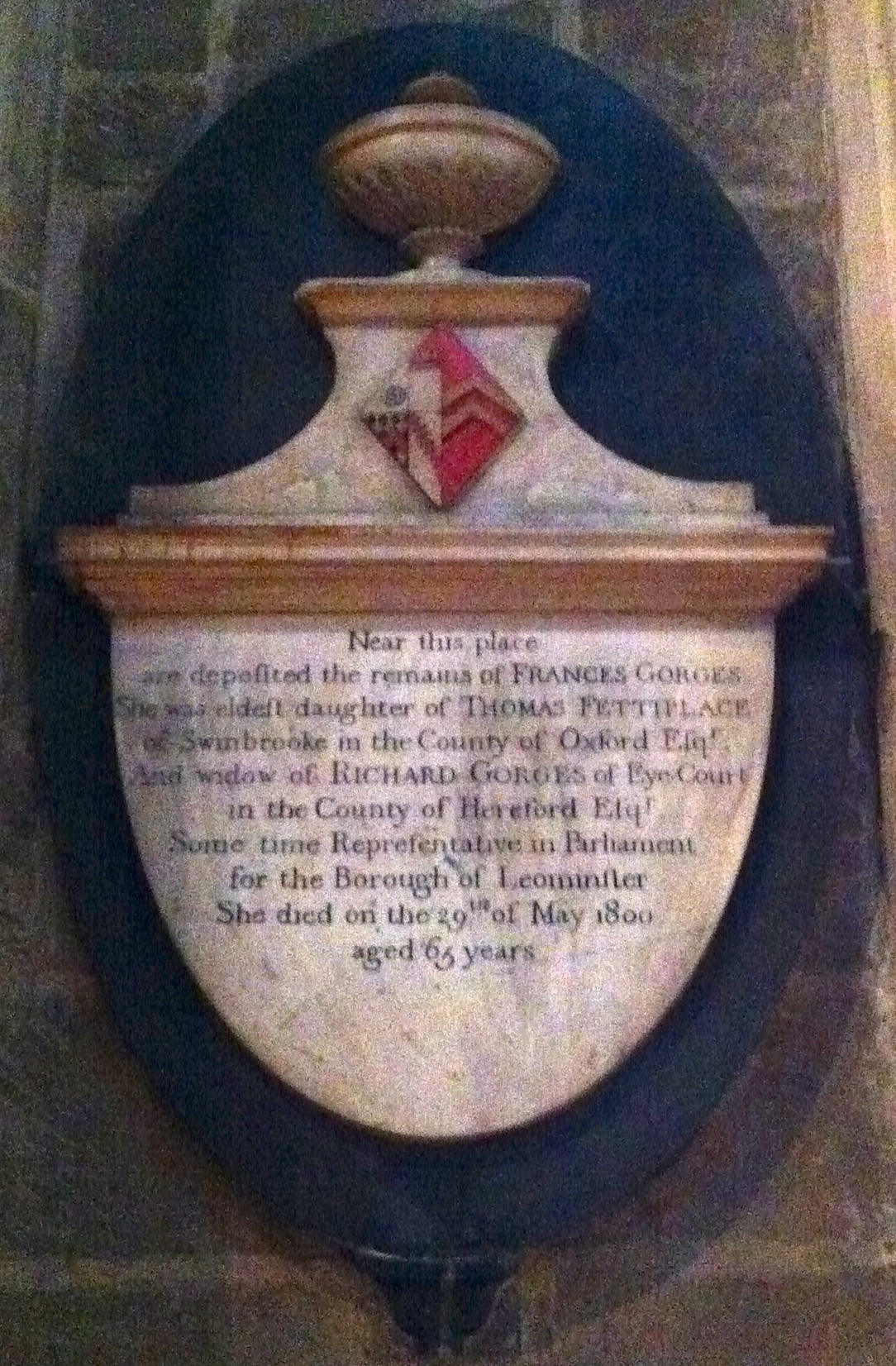
Monument in Gloucester Cathedral to Frances Fettiplace (1735-1800), eldest daughter of Thomas Fettiplace of Swinbrooke, Oxfordshire, and wife of Richard Gorges

Richard Gorges (c.1730–1780) of Eye Court, Herefordshire, was an English Member of Parliament for Leominster 1754–61.

== Origins ==
He was the eldest son of Richard Gorges of Eye by Elizabeth Rodd, a daughter of John Rodd of Hereford.

== Marriage ==
He married Frances Fettiplace (1735–1800), eldest daughter of Thomas Fettiplace of Swinbrooke, Oxfordshire.
