= Mandeville =

Mandeville (/ˈmændəˌvɪl/) may refer to:

== People ==
- Bernard Mandeville (1670–1733), Dutch-English philosopher, economist, and satirist
- Betty Mandeville (1910–2001), American radio director and producer
- Catherine Mandeville Snow (1793–1834), last woman executed in Newfoundland
- Chris Mandeville (born 1965), American football defensive back
- De Mandeville, the surname of a Norman noble family
- Francis Mandeville (1850–1905), Irish nationalist politician
- Fred Mandeville (1922–2020), Canadian politician
- Gay Mandeville (1894–1969), Bishop of Barbados
- Grace Mandeville (born 1994), British actress
- John Mandeville (disambiguation), multiple persons
- Liam Mandeville (born 1997), English professional footballer
- Liz Mandeville, American musician
- Roger de Mandeville, 13th-century noble, son of Agatha
- William G. Mandeville (1807–1885), New York politician

== Geoffrey de Mandeville descendants ==
- Geoffrey de Mandeville (11th century) (died 1100), Constable of the Tower of London
- William de Mandeville (died before 1130), Anglo-Norman baron and Constable of the Tower of London
- Geoffrey de Mandeville, 1st Earl of Essex (died 1144), during the reign of King Stephen of England
- Geoffrey de Mandeville, 2nd Earl of Essex (died 1166), second son of Geoffrey de Mandeville
- William de Mandeville, 3rd Earl of Essex (died 1189), loyal councillor of Henry II and Richard I of England
- Geoffrey FitzGeoffrey de Mandeville, 2nd Earl of Essex (second creation, 1191–1216), opponent of King John
- William FitzGeoffrey de Mandeville, 3rd Earl of Essex (second creation, died 1227)

== Places ==
=== England ===
- Mandeville, former name of an electoral ward now known as Northolt Mandeville in the London Borough of Ealing

=== United States ===
- Mandeville, Arkansas
- Mandeville, Louisiana
- Mandeville, Missouri
- Mandeville, West Virginia
- Mandeville site, archaeological site in Georgia

=== Elsewhere ===
- Mandeville, Eure, Normandy, France
- Mandeville-en-Bessin, Calvados, Normandy, France
- Mandeville, Jamaica
- Mandeville, New Zealand, in Southland
- Mandeville North, in Canterbury, New Zealand
- Mandeville, Quebec, Canada
- 739 Mandeville, an asteroid

== Other uses ==
- Mandeville (novel) by William Godwin
- Mandeville Aerodrome, an airport at Mandeville, New Zealand
- Mandeville Films, American film production company
- Roman Catholic Diocese of Mandeville, Jamaica
- Mandeville, one of the London 2012 mascots
- Viscount Mandeville, a subsidiary title of the Duke of Manchester, England

== See also ==
- Mandeville School (disambiguation)
- Geoffrey de Mandeville (disambiguation)
