= Geoffrey de Mandeville =

Geoffrey de Mandeville is the name of several important medieval English barons:

- Geoffrey de Mandeville (11th century) (died 1100), during the reign of William the Conqueror
- Geoffrey de Mandeville, 1st Earl of Essex (died 1144), son of William de Mandeville and grandson of Geoffrey de Mandeville, become an outlaw during The Anarchy
- Geoffrey de Mandeville, 2nd Earl of Essex (died 1166), one of three sons of the 1st Earl
- Geoffrey FitzGeoffrey de Mandeville, 2nd Earl of Essex (1191–1216), opponent of King John of England
- Geoffrey de Mandeville (c. 1070 – c. 1119), Sheriff of Devon from 1100, and baron of Marshwood

== See also ==
- Mandeville (disambiguation)
