= Geoffrey de Mandeville, Baron of Marshwood =

Geoffrey de Mandeville (died c. 1119) was the Sheriff of Devon, England between 1100 and 1116 and also baron of Marshwood in Dorset. Marshwood is near the border of Devon and Dorset, 5.5 miles north-east of Lyme Regis.

== Origins ==
Geoffrey came from Magneville in the Cotentin peninsula of Normandy. He had a brother called Roger de Mandeville. It has been suggested that their father was the Domesday tenant-in-chief Geoffrey de Mandeville (11th century), and Geoffrey's brother Roger succeeded to his father's estates in Normandy. This relationship is not, however, very definitely established. The Domesday tenant-in-chief, Geoffrey de Mandeville was the grandfather of Geoffrey de Mandeville, 1st Earl of Essex. Some sources suggest that Geoffrey de Mandeville the Domesday tenant, and therefore his descendants who were Earls of Essex, were native to Thil-Manneville, whereas the de Mandeville family of the south west of England who were barons of Marshwood and Erlestoke were native to Magneville.

== Life ==
Geoffrey's feudal lord in the Cotentin was Richard de Redvers (or Reviers). Richard's manor was at Néhou, which is three miles south of Magneville. Richard de Redvers was a staunch supporter of the future Henry I of England and helped him with others to regain the Cotentin area of Normandy. Geoffrey and Roger were both confederates of Richard. Roger de Mandeville was noted as early as 1091, assisting the young prince Henry in the recovery of the Cotentin. For their support before 1100, Geoffrey and Roger were rewarded by Henry. Roger was made lord of Erlestoke in Wiltshire. Geoffrey was made Sheriff of Devon, and baron of Marshwood. He was also given the manor of Wonford, and made warden of Exeter Castle. This castle was the base of operations for the sheriff of Devon, and during that time was called Rougemont Castle. Richard de Redvers was given land in Devon, Hampshire and the Isle of Wight. He was also made Lord of the Isle of Wight. Geoffrey attested many of king Henry's charters. He was subordinate to Richard de Redvers during his time as Sheriff, and refers to him in one charter as his lord. After the death of Richard de Redvers in 1107, Geoffrey was given land at Whitcombe on the Isle of Wight.

== Family ==
Geoffrey's oldest son was called Robert. The name of Robert's mother is unknown. After the death of his first wife, by Geoffrey's second wife he had a son named Ralph. The name of Ralph's mother is also unknown. Robert and Ralph, sons of Geoffrey confirmed a charter of their father after the death of Richard de Redvers. When Geoffrey died, the title of the barony of Marshwood was given by Henry I to this second son Ralph, because he was a better Knight than his older half-brother Robert. The barony of Marshwood passed from Ralph, the younger brother of Robert and younger son of Geoffrey, to Ralph's daughter Dyonisia. Dyonisia married William Fitzjohn, who was the Seneschal of Normandy. The barony then passed to William's son, Henry de Tilly. Before his death, Geoffrey de Mandeville de Cocre, grandson of Geoffrey from his oldest son Robert, started an action against Henry to recover the barony back. Geoffrey was dead by 1200. The case was taken up again by William, Geoffrey's son. It was then taken up by Robert, who was the grandson of Geoffrey de Mandeville de Cocre from Geoffrey's oldest son, also called Robert who predeceased this Geoffrey. This Robert de Mandeville was therefore, the great-great-grandson of Geoffrey de Mandeville who was Sheriff of Devon, and first baron of Marshwood. Robert was successful in his case. On 24 May 1206 at Portchester a confirmation charter stated that Robert and then his heirs were to be given the barony of Marshwood, because he was descended from the oldest son of Geoffrey de Mandeville, the first baron of Marshwood.

Geoffrey was an uncle of Stephen de Mandeville, who held a considerable fief in Manche. He was the son of Geoffrey's brother Roger. During the period known as the anarchy, Stephen was a principal companion in arms and ally of Baldwin de Redvers, son of Richard. They were both supporters of Empress Matilda, during the civil war against Stephen, King of England. In 1136, Baldwin de Redvers was involved in a siege against King Stephen at Exeter Castle which lasted for three months. The siege against king Stephen was unsuccessful. Baldwin was exiled and fled to the court of Geoffrey Plantagenet, Count of Anjou, and Stephen de Mandeville followed. Between 1136 and 1139, Stephen and Baldwin with others tried to seek revenge against king Stephen by carrying out raids in Manche, possibly using the de Redvers manor of Néhou as a base. Baldwin was made the first Earl of Devon in 1141 by Matilda.

To Stephen de Mandeville, or another member of his family, Baldwin de Redvers granted the manor of Coker in Somerset as a sub-fee. This passed to the grandson of Geoffrey de Mandeville, who was son of his oldest son Robert, and known as Geoffrey de Mandeville de Cocre.

Along with the barony of Marshwood and the manor of Coker, the de Mandeville's also held the manors of Hardington, and Keinton in Somerset. They were named Hardington Mandeville and Keinton Mandeville.
