= Eaton Socon Castle =

Castle in Cambridgeshire, England, UK

Coordinates: 52.21581°N 0.28385°W

Eaton Socon Castle was a Norman fortification. It was constructed next to the River Great Ouse in what is now Eaton Socon, Cambridgeshire, England.

It was hastily built during a period of civil war over the succession to the throne. It was mostly destroyed after 1154 and was in a ruined state in the thirteenth century. it is now merely a derelict grassy earthwork and is not accessible to the public. Known as "The Hillings", it is a Scheduled Historic Monument with Historic England.

== History ==
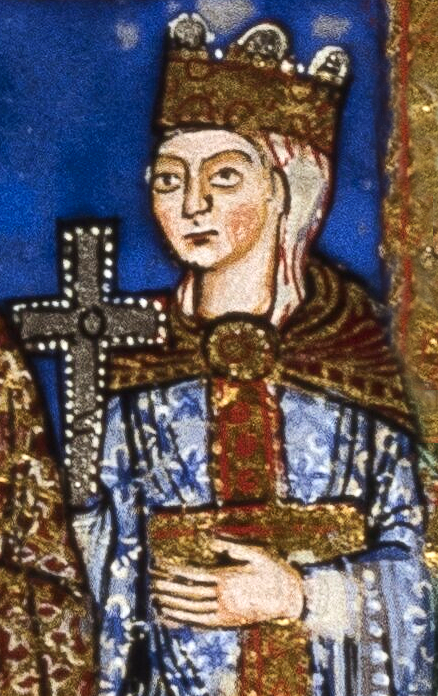
Empress Matilda

Hugh de Beauchamp was a Norman landowner, installed during the Norman Conquest, and based in Bedford. He acquired the manor of Eaton (present-day Eaton Socon) in about 1120 and it was probably he who built Eaton Socon castle. From 1139 to 1153 there was civil war in England as Stephen and Matilda contested the throne.

Matilda had been nominated as successor to his throne by her father, King Henry I. While many of the barons were content with this, several of them objected to the succession, partly because she was a woman and partly because they disliked her husband, Geoffrey de Plantagenet. Accordingly they called on Henry's nephew Stephen to take the throne in her place. Armed conflict was inevitable, and during this period several simple castles were hastily constructed.

Eaton Socon Castle has been tentatively dated to 1140; it was never completed, and it is concluded that it was one of the war emergency castles described that were hastily built by Stephen's supporters. It was of a simple motte-and-bailey construction with the timber-framed living quarters within the two wards of the flat bailey area and a wooden watch-tower on the top of the conical mound which was the motte. Very few pieces of stone have been found on the site, and it is probable that the primitive timber structure was never strengthened.

Nevertheless it was certainly occupied during the 12th century, and the prestige of having a castle, and of the later occupancy, resulted in Eaton being promoted to the status of Lesser Barony.

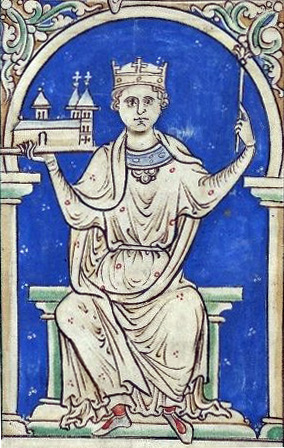
Stephen of England

It was Stephen who succeeded to the throne in 1135, but it was Matilda's son Henry Plantagenet who succeeded to the throne when Stephen died in 1154. One of Henry's first commands was to order the destruction of all adulterine castles, that is, those built without royal permission during the civil war.

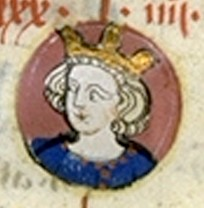
Henry Plantagenet

It is likely that Eaton Socon Castle was demolished as part of this move, although residential accommodation may have survived: fragments of 13th-century pottery and traces of buildings from that era have been found on the site and "Lady Juliana de Beauchamp" is recorded as a resident at Eaton Socon at that time.

== The castle ==
The castle was a Norman double enclosure, whose construction required the demolition of houses occupied by Anglo-Saxons. It was surrounded by a moat supplied with water diverted from the adjacent River Great Ouse. It was once in possession of the de Mandeville family, but by 1156 it was held by the descendants of Hugh de Beauchamp.

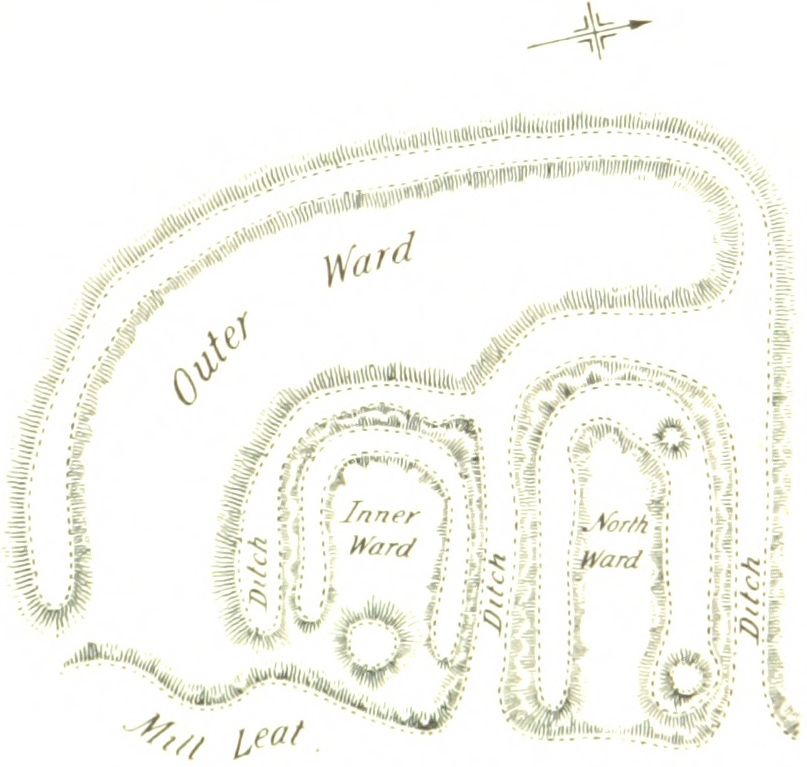
A plan of the castle from J. D. Mackenzie's The Castles of England: their story and structure

An early plan shows that the castle layout was complex.

Historic England describe the castle:

Castle Hills is a Norman ringwork castle overlying part of a late Saxon vill and medieval village which was deserted, at least in part, to make way for the stronghold. The ringwork was used subsequently as the site of a windmill. The monument is situated on a gravel terrace on the west bank of the River Great Ouse. The ringwork has a bailey on its north side and is surrounded to the west by a ditch enclosing an outer court. The ringwork itself is irregular in plan... A waterfilled ditch 15-20m wide by 1.5m deep runs along the western and southern sides and a slightly shallower 10m wide dry ditch separates the stronghold from the bailey on the northern side. There is a narrow causeway across the junction of these ditches at the north-west.

Its location is grid reference TL174588.

== Holding prison for suspected criminals ==
Pounds discusses the use of independent castles for the detention of suspected criminals:

The sheriff or his bailiffs arrested suspected felons and held them until the arrival of the justices. Suitable gaols were rare, but the sheriff had authority to use any private castle. In 1274, there was an assault at Tempsford (Bedfordshire). The suspected felon was caught and taken to Eaton Socon Castle, which lay nearby. The castle must by this date have been almost derelict, and he was held only until he could be taken to the greater security of Bedford gaol., where he awaited the next gaol delivery.

== Fighting giants ==
As well as the remains of the Castle here, there are remains of a Roman defensive earthwork at Coneygeare, in Eynesbury. There was a popular legend, that a giant, stationed upon the mound at Coneygeare, was accustomed to throw a weapon to another giant posted on the Norman keep at Eaton Socon, a distance of three-quarters of a mile. The weapon was thrown back and forth by the two giants.

== Remains ==
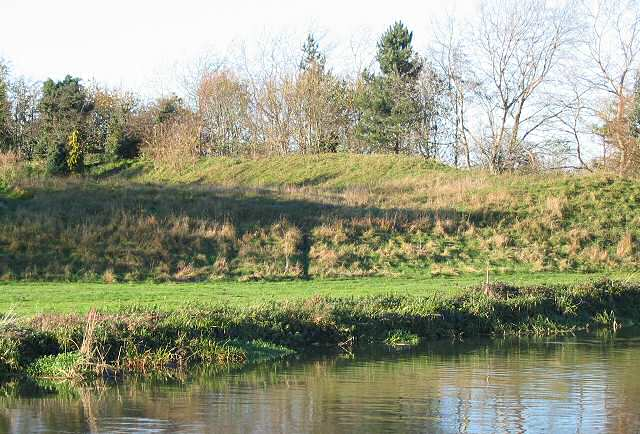
The remains of the castle

Only earthworks now remain and these are not accessible to the public as they are in the grounds of a private residence (Castle Hill House). The site is a Scheduled Ancient Monument, recorded as The Hillings.

== See also ==
- Castles in Great Britain and Ireland
- List of castles in England
