= Walden Abbey =

Former Benedictine monastery in Saffron Walden, Essex, England

Coordinates: 52.022395°N 0.241184°E

Walden Priory (Abbey)
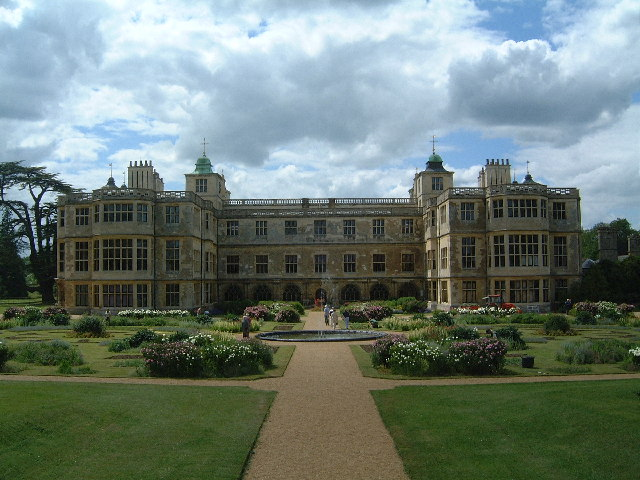
- Audley End House on the site of the abbey
- Interactive map of Walden Priory (Abbey)

Monastery information
- Full name: Abbey of Saint Mary and Saint James
- Order: Benedictine
- Denomination: Roman Catholicism
- Established: c. 1140
- Disestablished: 22 March 1538
- Dedication: St Mary and St James the Apostle
- Diocese: London
- Controlled churches: St Mary the Virgin, Saffron Walden

People
- Founder: Geoffrey de Manderville
- Abbot: William More

Architecture
- Status: Demolished
- Style: Romanesque with elements of Gothic
- Completed date: c. 1300

Site
- Location: Saffron Walden, Essex, United Kingdom
- Visible remains: None
- Public access: Full access to the site

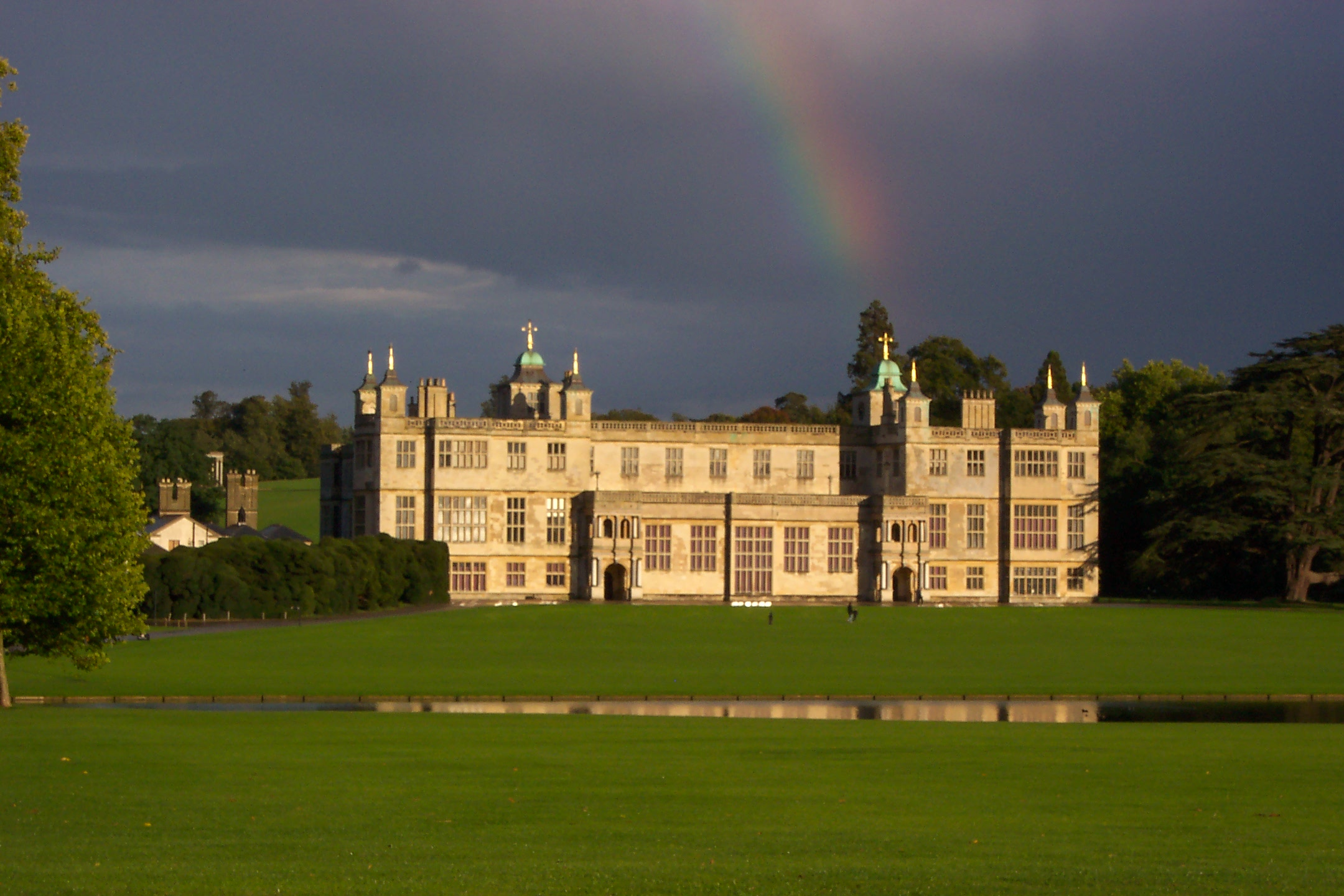
The Jacobean mansion

Walden Abbey was a Benedictine monastery in Saffron Walden, Essex, England, founded by Geoffrey de Mandeville, 1st Earl of Essex, between 1136 and 1143. Originally a priory, it was elevated to the status of an abbey in 1190.

Soon after its founding, Earl Geoffrey was arrested by King Stephen. When released on surrender of his castles, the earl launched a rebellion that lasted over a year. When he was killed, he had been excommunicated and could not be buried at the priory. Walden suffered without a clear patron through the rest of Stephen's reign. Even when Geoffrey de Mandeville, 2nd Earl of Essex regained his father's title and lands under King Henry II, he did little to assist his father's foundation. Nonetheless, when he died in 1166, his body was taken to Walden Priory for burial despite a suggestion that his mother Rohese de Vere, Countess of Essex, send her men to seize her son's body and have it buried in the monastery she had founded at Chicksands.

Walden's relations with Geoffrey's brother and heir William de Mandeville, 3rd Earl of Essex were slightly better, although the member of the community who wrote the Book of the Foundation of Walden claimed that Countess Rohese turned him against Walden. On his death in 1189, the monastery was again left without a clear patron for a number of years. The earldom of Essex eventually passed to the husband of a distant cousin of earl William, Geoffrey fitz Peter, along with the patronage of Walden and the Mandeville lands and titles. The monks quarrelled with him.

The abbey eventually came under the patronage of the Duchy of Lancaster in the later Middle Ages, and thus passed to the crown in 1399.

After the dissolution of Walden during the reign of Henry VIII, the abbey property was purchased by Sir Thomas Audley, who built Audley End House there. The current Jacobean mansion was built for his grandson, Thomas Howard, 1st Earl of Suffolk.

== Burials at the Abbey (some in the priory preceding) ==
- Geoffrey de Mandeville, 2nd Earl of Essex
- Humphrey de Bohun, 3rd Earl of Hereford
- Joan de Bohun, Countess of Hereford
- Elizabeth of Rhuddlan, Countess of Hereford, daughter or Edward I of England
- Humphrey de Bohun, 7th Earl of Hereford
- William de Bohun, 1st Earl of Northampton
- Humphrey, 2nd Earl of Buckingham

== See also ==
- List of monastic houses in Essex
