= Constable of the Tower =

Ceremonial role at the Tower of London

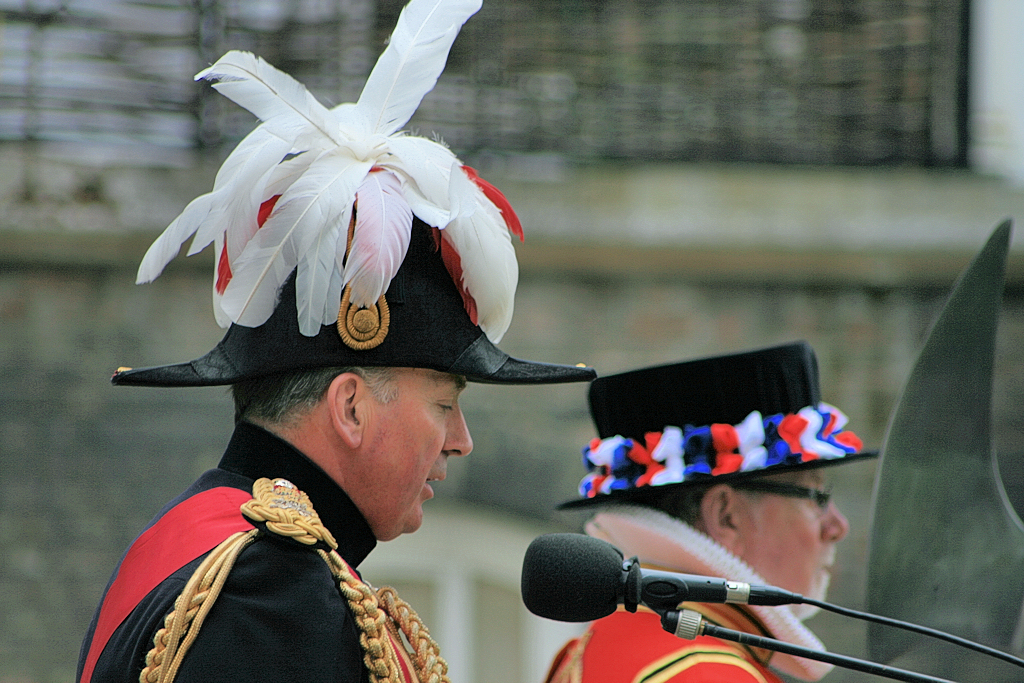
General Richard Dannatt, dressed in full ceremonial uniform of HM's Constable of the Tower (2010)

The Constable of the Tower is the most senior appointment at the Tower of London. In the Middle Ages a constable was the person in charge of a castle when the owner—the king or a nobleman—was not in residence. The Constable of the Tower had a unique importance as the person in charge of the principal fortress defending the capital city of England.

Today the role of Constable is a ceremonial one and mainly involves taking part in traditional ceremonies within the Tower as well as being part of the community that lives within its perimeter. The Constable is also a trustee of Historic Royal Palaces and of the Royal Armouries.

Under the King's Regulations for the Army, the office of Constable is conferred upon a field marshal or a retired general officer for a five-year term. The Constable appointed in 2022 is General Sir Gordon Messenger. The Constable's ceremonial deputy is the Lieutenant of the Tower of London, currently Lieutenant General Sir George Norton; this office is generally entrusted to a general officer of lower rank than the Constable.

At the conclusion of the Constable's installation ceremony, the Lord Chamberlain symbolically hands over the King's House to the Constable. He in turn entrusts it to the Resident Governor, who is responsible for the day-to-day running of the Tower of London.

== History ==
The office of Constable of the Tower is one of the oldest in England, dating back to within a few years of the Norman Conquest, and has always been one of great honour and dignity. In the past, this appointment has been held by eminent prelates of the Church, prominent politicians and distinguished soldiers. The first Constable, Geoffrey de Mandeville was appointed by William the Conqueror (AD 1066–87) in the 11th century. Formerly, in the absence of the Sovereign, the Constable would have been among the most powerful men in London. Today the Constable retains the right of direct access to the Sovereign. Since 1784 the Constable has always been a senior military officer.

During the medieval period the Constable ran the Tower, which included building maintenance, soldiers' pay and, as the Royal menagerie was housed in the Tower, supervision of the 'Keeper of the King's Animals'. He was also ultimately responsible for the prisoners kept there. The first known prisoner was the Norman bishop Ranulf Flambard in 1100, and the London gangsters Ronnie and Reggie Kray were the last official prisoners, for a few days in 1952, for refusing to do their National Service. They were sent to the Tower as it was the barracks of the 1st Battalion Royal Fusiliers (City of London Regiment) to which they had been assigned.

The Constable's responsibility for prisoners was made clear in the words with which he was entrusted with them: "You are to guard them securely in the prison of our said tower in such a way that you shall answer for them body for body ... Fail in no part of this on pain of forfeiture of life and limb and all property you hold in our realms."

Until the expulsion of the Jews in 1290, the Constable was responsible for the regulation and protection of London's Jewry.

The Lieutenant of the Tower was the Constable's deputy, and de facto head once the Constable became a ceremonial sinecure. The Lieutenant in turn became a ceremonial post, with real function delegated to a Deputy-Lieutenant and a Major; the latter post evolved into the current Resident Governor.

The five-year term of office was introduced in 1932. For two centuries prior it was typically held for life, although some holders resigned.

== Lord Lieutenant of the Tower Hamlets ==
The Constable also held the office of Lord Lieutenant of the Tower Hamlets, which existed from the Restoration until 1889, and had authority with the Tower division of the hundred of Ossulstone. In the 17th century, Ossulstone, the urbanising part of Middlesex which bordered the City of London, was split into four divisions, of which the Tower division lay east of the city, compassing all the modern London Borough of Tower Hamlets and most of that of Hackney. The division was also called Tower Hamlets, after the hamlets (later to become parishes) of the ancient parish of Stepney. Each Ossulstone division had status equivalent to that of a hundred, while Tower division had some extra powers normally reserved for a county, in particular its own lord-lieutenant. This enabled the Constable, as Lord Lieutenant, to raise local militia forces to supplement the Tower garrison at times of increased tension, or for use in the field. The City of London Militia Act 1662 restricting the power of levying militia to [lord-]lieutenants had a saver for the Constable:

whereas the Militia of the Tower Division in the County of Middlesex comonly knowne by the name of the Tower Hamletts are and alwaies have beene under the co[m]mand of His Majesties Constable or Leiutenant of the Tower for the Service and Preservation of that His Royall Fort [...] it shall and may be lawfull for His Majesties Constable or Leiutenant of the Tower for the time being to continue to levy the Trained Bands of the said Division or Hamlets of the Tower in such manner and form as to the number and quality of persons as was observed in forming the present Forces thereof Any thing in this Act to the contrary notwithstanding

The offices of Constable and Lord Lieutenant were awarded by separate letters patent, usually simultaneously. Exceptionally, in 1715, Hatton Compton was made Lord Lieutenant of the Tower Hamlets and Lieutenant of the Tower, whereas Charles Howard, 3rd Earl of Carlisle, made Constable in 1715, did not replace Compton as Lord Lieutenant until 1717. The Constable of the Tower is not to be confused with the "High Constable of the Tower Division": the high constable of a hundred or division had charge of the parish constables of its constituent parishes. A Lord Lieutenant could commission deputy lieutenants. The Deputy Lieutenants of the Tower Hamlets (listed below) are not to be confused with the above mentioned Deputy-Lieutenant of the Tower. The County of London created in 1889 included the area of Tower Hamlets, and the new Lord Lieutenant of the County of London took over the Tower Hamlets lieutenancy's functions.

== Constable's dues ==
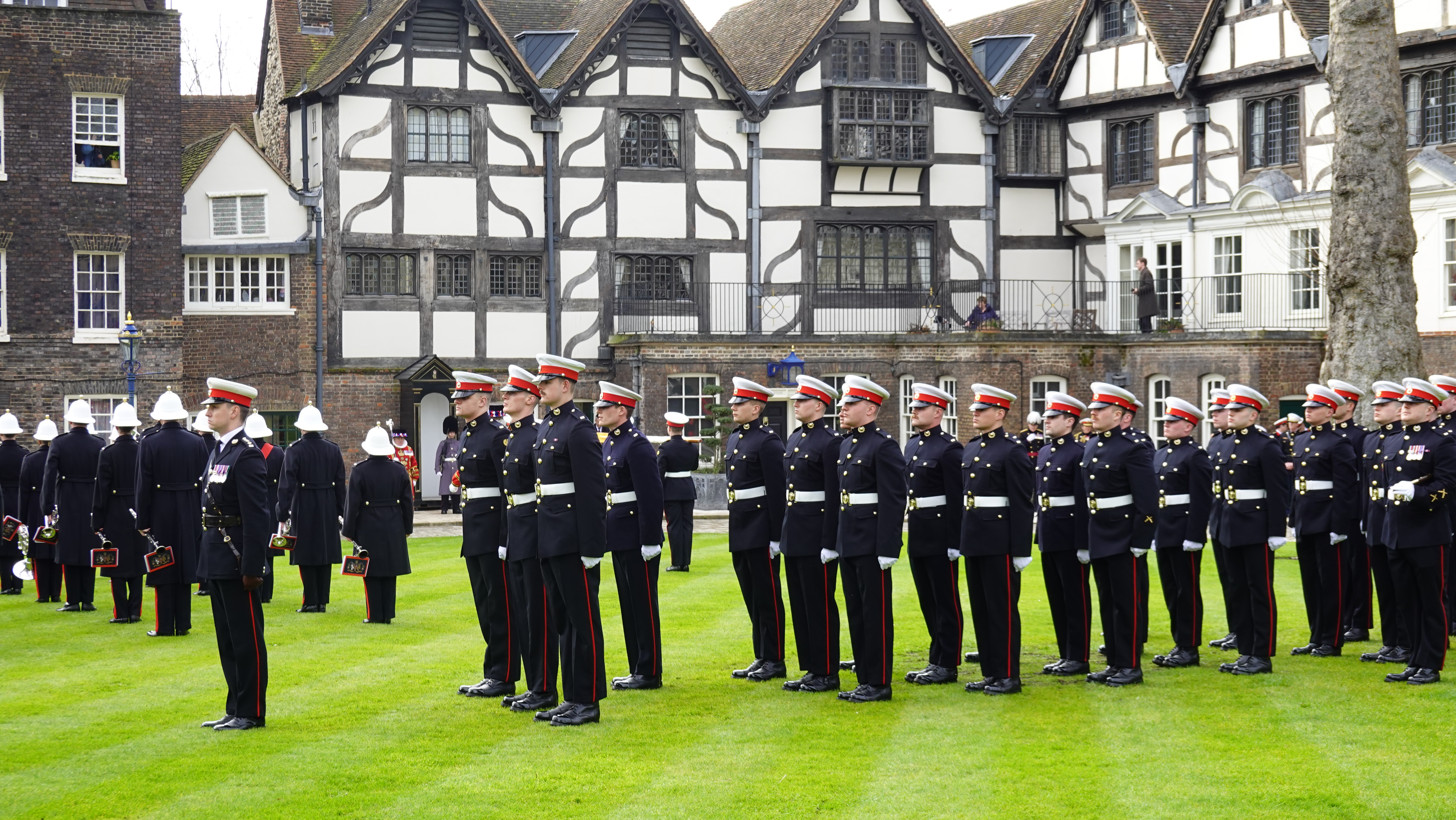
The 2024 Constable's Dues Ceremony at the Tower of London.

In the Middle Ages it was a profitable position; among the Constable's entitlements were:

- any horses, oxen, pigs or sheep that fell off London Bridge
- any cart that fell into the Tower moat
- all herbage growing on Tower Hill
- 6/8d (six shillings and eight pence) annually from each boat fishing between the Tower and the sea
- 1s (1 shilling) a year from all ships carrying herring to London
- 2d (2 pence) from each pilgrim who came to London, by sea, to worship at the shrine of St James
- all swans swimming under London Bridge.

Every ship that came upstream to London had to moor at Tower Wharf to give a portion of its cargo to the Constable, as payment for the protection afforded by the Tower's cannon. These dues included oysters, mussels, cockles, rushes, and wine. The tradition is still maintained today by the Royal Navy, at the annual Ceremony of the Constable's Dues, when one large vessel presents the Constable with a barrel of rum.

In 2026, the ceremony was led by a contingent of 100 cadets from the Volunteer Cadet Corps in celebration of the organisation's 125th anniversary. The event marked a historic milestone, representing the first occasion on which the duties were carried out by a youth organisation.

Since 1784 the tradition has been for the Constable to be a senior military officer, usually a general officer. Perhaps the most famous Constable was Arthur Wellesley, 1st Duke of Wellington, who served from 1825 to 1852. During his tenure, the royal menagerie and record office were removed and many buildings were restored to their medieval state. The moat was drained and converted into a parade ground. Yeomen Warders were no longer permitted to buy and sell their places but were to be drawn only from sergeants in the Army. To Wellington's displeasure, tourism at the Tower increased during his Constableship.

Each Constable is now appointed for five years. The new Constable is handed the keys as a symbol of office. On state occasions the Constable has custody of the crown and other royal jewels.

== List ==
Constables of the Tower (1068–date) and Lord Lieutenant of the Tower Hamlets (1660–1890)
| Portrait | Name | From | To | Note |
Constable of the Tower
| | Geoffrey de Mandeville | 1068 (?) | | First Constable, appointed by William the Conqueror |
| | William de Mandeville | 1100 | 1116 (?) | Son of Geoffrey I de Mandeville, held Ranulf Flambard |
| | Othuer fitz Count | 1116? | 1120 | Son of Hugh d'Avranches, Earl of Chester. |
| | Hasculf de Tany | 1120 | 1140? | |
| | Geoffrey de Mandeville, 1st Earl of Essex | 1140 | 1144 (d.) | Son of William de Mandeville |
| | no record of Constables during reign of Stephen, 1144–1153 | | | |
| | Richard de Lucie | 1153 | 1179 (d.) | also Chief Justiciar |
| | Garnier de Isenei | | | |
| | William Longchamp | 1189 | | Bishop of Ely, Chancellor and Regent |
| | William Puintellus | 1189 | | Sub-Constable |
| | Walter of Coutances | 1191 | | Bishop of Rouen |
| | Roger Fitz Renfred | 1194 | | brother of Walter of Coutances |
| | Geoffrey Fitz Peter | 1198 | | Chief Justiciar; created Earl of Essex, 1199 |
| | Roger de la Dune | 1205 | | |
| | Geoffrey FitzGeoffrey de Mandeville | October 1213 | | Son of Geoffrey FitzPeter |
| | William de Cornhill | November 1213 | | Archdeacon of Huntingdon |
| | Eustace de Greinville | 1214 | | |
| | Stephen Langton | June 1215 | | Archbishop of Canterbury |
| | Tower occupied by Prince Louis of France | June 1216 | | |
| | Walter de Verdun | 1217 | | |
| | Stephen de Segrave | 1220 | | Chief Justiciar |
| | Hugh de Wyndlesore | 1224 | | |
| | John de Boville and Thomas de Blumvill or Blundeville (probably together) | 1225 | | Blundeville was Bishop of Norwich, 1226 |
| | Henry Fitz Aucher | 1227 | | |
| | Ralph de Gatel | 1230 | | |
| | Hubert de Burgh, Earl of Kent | July 1232 | | |
| | Ralph de Ralegh | 1232 | | Sub-Constable |
| | William de St. Edmund | 1233 | | |
| | Hugh Giffard | 1234 | | Lord of Boyton, Wiltshire, father of Walter Giffard and Godfrey Giffard |
| | Geoffrey de Crancumb | March 1235 | | |
| | Hugh Giffard (again) | April 1236 | | |
| | Walter de Gray, Archbishop of York and Bertram de Criol (jointly) | 1240 | Midsummer 1242 | de Criol Constable of Dover Castle 1242–1256 |
| | Peter de Vallibus | 1244 | | |
| | John de Plessis | June 1244 | | |
| | Peter le Blund | 1246 | | |
| | Aymon Thorimbergh | September 1256 | | |
| | Imbert Pugeys | 1257 | | |
| | Hugh Bigod | 1258 | | Chief Justiciar |
| | Richard de Culwurth | 1261 | | |
| | Sir John Maunsell or Maunsel | May 1261 | | |
| | Richard de Tilbury | 1261 | | |
| | Hugh le Despencer | 1262 | | Chief Justiciar, killed at Evesham, 4 August 1265 |
| | Roger de Leyburn | 1265 | | |
| | Hugh Fitz Otho | October 1265 | | |
| | John Walerand and John de la Lynde (jointly) | November 1265 | | |
| | Alan la Zouche | 1265 | | |
| | Thomas de Ippegrave | April 1268 | | |
| | Stephen de Eddeville | July 1268 | | |
| | Hugh Fitz Otho (again) | 1269 | | |
| | Walter Giffard | 1272 | | Archbishop of York |
| | John de Burgh | December 1273 | | |
| | Philip Basset | 1274 | | |
| | Anthony de Bec | 1275 | | Bishop of Durham |
| | Richard de Waldegrave | June 1280 | | Sub-Constable |
| | Ralph de Dacre | 1283 | | |
| | Ralph de Sandwich | September 1285 | | |
| | Ralph Berners | February 1289 | | |
| | Ralph de Sandwich (again) | July 1289 | | |
| | John de Cromwell, 1st Baron Cromwell | March 1308 | | |
| | Roger de Swynnerton | 1321 | | |
| | Stephen Segrave, 3rd Baron Segrave | February 1323 | | |
| | Walter de Stapledon | 1323 | | Bishop of Exeter |
| | John de Weston | November 1323 | | |
| | Eleanor de Clare | October 1326 | | Wife of Hugh Despenser, was briefly made Constable before surrendering the Tower during the London Uprising. The only female Constable of the Tower as of 2026. |
| | John de Gisors and Richard de Betoigne (jointly) | November 1326 | | |
| | Thomas Wake, 2nd Baron Wake of Liddell | December 1326 | | |
| | John de Cromwell, 1st Baron Cromwell (again) | March 1327 | | |
| | William, Baron la Zouche, of Mortimer | June 1328 | | |
| | John de Cromwell, 1st Baron Cromwell (again) | 1329 | | |
| | Nicholas de la Beche | October 1335 | | |
| | William Montagu, 1st Earl of Salisbury | 1335 | 1344 | |
| | Robert de Dalton | 1341 | | |
| | John Darcy, 1st Baron Darcy de Knayth | March 1346 | 1347 (d.) | |
| | John, Baron Darcy (son) | June 1347 | | |
| | Bartholomew de Burghersh, 1st Baron Burghersh | 1355 | August 1355 (d.) | |
| | Robert de Morley, 2nd Baron Morley | 1355 | | |
| | John de Beauchamp, 1st Baron Beauchamp de Warwick | | | |
| | Richard de la Vache | 1361 | | |
| | Sir Alan Buxhull | 1366 | | Knight of the Garter and chamberlain of the Royal household. Broke Westminster Abbey's sanctuary 1378 |
| | Sir Thomas Murrieux | December 1381 | | |
| | Thomas Holland, 2nd Earl of Kent | May 1387 | | |
| | Sir Thomas Morreux (? son of above) | July 1391 | | probably Deputy |
| | Edward (Plantagenet) | January 1392 | September 1397 | Earl of Rutland |
| | Ralph de Neville, 4th Baron Neville | September 1397 | October 1397 | 1st Earl of Westmorland from 29 September 1397 |
| | Edward Plantagenet (again) | October 1397 | August 1399 | Duke of Albemarle and Earl of Rutland |
| | Sir Thomas Rempston | October 1399 | | Drowned at London Bridge, 31 October 1406 |
| | Edward (Plantagenet) (again) | November 1406 | 1413 | now Duke of York, slain at Agincourt, 1415 |
| | John Dabrichecourt | 1413 | 1413 | Son of Sanchet D'Abrichecourt |
| | Robert de Morley | 1413 | 1415 | |
| | William Bourchier | November 1415 | | Earl of Eu, 1419, d. 1420 |
| | Roger Aston | July 1420 | August 1420 | |
| | John Holland, Earl of Huntingdon | August 1420 | | Duke of Exeter |
| | James Fienes, Lord Say | 1447 | July 1450 | Murdered by Jack Cade's mob, 4 July 1450 |
| | Henry Holland, 3rd Duke of Exeter | June 1451 | | |
| | William Bourchier, Viscount Bourchier | September 1460 | | |
| | John Tiptoft, 1st Earl of Worcester | December 1461 | October 1470 | Executed by Lancastrians, 18 October 1470 |
| | John Sutton, 1st Baron Dudley | 1470 | | |
| | Thomas Grey, 1st Marquess of Dorset | April 1483 | | In office before accession of Edward V in 1483 |
| | Sir Robert Brackenbury | July 1483 | | Killed at Bosworth Field, 22 August 1485 |
| | John de Vere, 13th Earl of Oxford | September 1485 | 1513 | |
| | Sir Thomas Lovell | March 1513 | 1524 | |
| | Sir William Kingston | May 1524 | 1540 | |
| | Sir John Gage | October 1540 | 1553 | |
| | Edward Clinton, 9th Baron Clinton | July 1553 | August 1553 | 1st Earl of Lincoln from 1572 |
| | Sir John Gage (again) | August 1553 | 1556 | |
| | Sir Edward Braye | 1556 | 1557 | |
| | Sir Robert Oxenbridge | January 1557 | 1558 | |
| | Peter Carew | 1572 | 1572 | |
| | Sir Richard Berkeley of Stoke Gifford | 1595 | | |
| | Sir William Wade (Lieutenant) | 1605 | 1611 | |
| | Sir Gervase Helwys (Lieutenant) | 1611 | 1615 | |
| | Sir George More (Lieutenant) | 1615 | 1617 | |
| | Sir Allen Apsley (Lieutenant) | 1617 | 1630 | |
| | Sir Thomas Lunsford (Lieutenant) | 1641 | 1641 | Served for a few days, per Clarendon |
| | Francis Cottington, 1st Baron Cottington | 1640 | | William Balfour was his Lieutenant |
| | Mountjoy Blount, 1st Earl of Newport | 1641 | | |
| | John Byron, 1st Baron Byron (Lieutenant) | 1641 | 1642 | |
| | Sir Thomas Fairfax | August 1647 | 1650 | Robert Tichborne was his Lieutenant. |
Constable of the Tower and Lord Lieutenant of the Tower Hamlets
| | Sir John Robinson, 1st Baronet | 3 October 1660 | 1675 | |
| | James Compton, 3rd Earl of Northampton | 30 July 1675 | 1679 | |
| | William Alington, 3rd Baron Alington | 8 June 1679 | 1 February 1685 | |
| | George Legge, 1st Baron Dartmouth | 29 June 1685 | 1688 | |
| | Robert Lucas, 3rd Baron Lucas of Shenfield | 1688 | June 1702 | Lord Lieutenant from 8 April 1689 |
| | Montagu Venables-Bertie, 2nd Earl of Abingdon | 29 June 1702 | 1705 | |
| | Algernon Capell, 2nd Earl of Essex | 23 May 1706 | 1710 | |
| | Richard Savage, 4th Earl Rivers | 5 February 1710 | 18 August 1712 | |
| | George Compton, 4th Earl of Northampton | 10 May 1712 | | |
| | Hatton Compton | 29 July 1715 | 1717 | Lord Lieutenant only; Lieutenant of the Tower 1715–1740 but never Constable. |
| | Charles Howard, 3rd Earl of Carlisle | 26 October 1715 (Constable); 12 July 1717 (Lord Lieutenant) | 29 December 1722 | |
| | Henry Clinton, 7th Earl of Lincoln | 30 January 1723 | 1725 | |
| | Charles Paulet, 3rd Duke of Bolton | 19 June 1725 | 1726 | |
| | Henry Lowther, 3rd Viscount Lonsdale | 24 November 1726 | 1731 | |
| | John Sidney, 6th Earl of Leicester | 15 October 1731 | 27 September 1737 | |
| | Charles Cornwallis, 1st Earl Cornwallis | 30 May 1740 | 23 June 1762 | |
| | John Berkeley, 5th Baron Berkeley of Stratton | 26 July 1762 | 1770 | |
| | Charles Cornwallis, 2nd Earl Cornwallis | 1770 | 1784 | Lord Lieutenant from 4 January 1771 |
| | Lord George Lennox | 12 March 1784 | 1784 | |
| | Charles Cornwallis, 2nd Earl Cornwallis | 26 November 1784 | 5 October 1805 | 1st Marquess Cornwallis from 1792 |
| | Francis Rawdon-Hastings, 1st Marquess of Hastings | 24 February 1806 | 28 November 1826 | |
| | Arthur Wellesley, 1st Duke of Wellington | 29 January 1827 | 14 September 1852 | Lord Lieutenant from 1826 |
| | Stapleton Cotton, 1st Viscount Combermere | 20 October 1852 | 21 February 1865 | |
| | Sir John Burgoyne, Baronet | 12 April 1865 | 7 October 1871 | |
| | Sir George Pollock, 1st Baronet | 20 November 1871 | 6 October 1872 | |
| | Sir William Maynard Gomm | 8 November 1872 | 15 March 1875 | |
| | Sir Charles Yorke | 9 April 1875 | 20 November 1880 | Died in office |
| | Sir William Fenwick Williams | 9 May 1881 | 1881 | Resigned |
| | Sir Richard James Dacres | 2 July 1881 | 6 December 1886 | Died in office |
| | Robert Napier, 1st Baron Napier of Magdala | 6 January 1887 | 14 January 1890 | Died in office as Constable; the Lord Lieutenancy of the Tower Hamlets had been abolished they previous year. |
Constable of the Tower
| | Sir Daniel Lysons | 24 March 1890 | 29 January 1898 | Died in office. |
| | Sir Frederick Stephenson | 21 March 1898 | 10 March 1911 | Died in office |
| | Sir Henry Evelyn Wood | 11 May 1911 | 2 December 1919 | Died in office |
| | Paul Methuen, 3rd Baron Methuen | 23 June 1920 | 30 October 1932 | Died in office |
| | George Milne, 1st Baron Milne | 19 February 1933 | 18 February 1938 | |
| | Sir Claud Jacob | 19 February 1938 | 18 March 1943 | |
| | Sir Philip Chetwode, 7th Baronet | 19 March 1943 | 18 March 1948 | 1st Baron Chetwode from 1945. |
| | Archibald Wavell, 1st Earl Wavell | 19 March 1948 | 24 May 1950 | Died in office. |
| | Alan Brooke, 1st Viscount Alanbrooke | 1 August 1950 | 31 July 1955 | |
| | Henry Maitland Wilson, 1st Baron Wilson | 1 August 1955 | 31 July 1960 | |
| | Harold Alexander, 1st Earl Alexander of Tunis | 1 August 1960 | 31 July 1965 | |
| | Sir Gerald Templer | 1 August 1965 | 31 July 1970 | |
| | Sir Richard Hull | 1 August 1970 | 31 July 1975 | |
| | Sir Geoffrey Baker | 1 August 1975 | 8 May 1980 | Died in office. |
| | Sir Peter Hunt | 1 August 1980 | 31 July 1985 | |
| | Sir Roland Gibbs | 1 August 1985 | 31 July 1990 | |
| | Sir John Stanier | 1 August 1990 | 31 July 1996 | |
| | Sir Peter Inge | 1 August 1996 | July 2001 | Baron Inge from 1997. |
| | Sir Roger Wheeler | 1 August 2001 | 31 July 2009 | |
| | Sir Richard Dannatt | 1 August 2009 | July 2016 | Baron Dannatt from 2011 |
| | Sir Nicholas Houghton | 31 July 2016 | 1 August 2022 | Baron Houghton of Richmond from 2017 |
| | Sir Gordon Messenger | 1 August 2022 | | |

=== Deputy lieutenants ===
A deputy lieutenant of the Tower Hamlets was commissioned by the Lord Lieutenant of the Tower Hamlets. Deputy lieutenants support the work of the lord-lieutenant.

- 28 June 1831: Charles Bradshaw Stutfield
- 14 March 1846: Frederick Hodgson
- 1 March 1870: Sir Bruce Maxwell Seton, Bart; William Wainwright; James Ebenezer Saunders
