= Major of the Tower of London =

The Major of the Tower of London, later also styled Resident Governor, was an officer of the Tower of London, subordinate to the Constable and the Lieutenant.

== List of majors of the Tower ==
- Richard White
- 1747: Charles Rainsford
- 1750: Charles Henry Collins
- 1778: John Parr
- 1785: John Shrimpton
- 1788: Lloyd Hill
- 1793: Matthew Smith
- 1812: Lachlan Maclean
- 4 July 1816: John Henry Elrington
- 31 March 1857: Frederick Amelius Whimper
- 29 August 1870: George Bryan Milman
- 2 July 1909: Henry Pipon
- 1 July 1923: Daniel Burges
- 1 July 1933: William Frederick Oliver Faviell
- 1 July 1945: Edward Hamilton Carkeet-James
- 1 July 1955: Leslie Frederic Ethelbert Wieler
- 1 July 1961: Sir Thomas Pierce Butler

Butler was additionally appointed Keeper of the Jewel House on 5 February 1968, and the two posts have remained united since.
