= Louis of Bourbon, Lord of Préaux =

Louis of Borbón-Préaux (c. 1368 – October 25, 1415, at the battle of Agincourt) was a French knight, Lord of Préaux. He was the son of Jacques of Bourbon-Préaux, Lord of Préaux, and Grand Butler of France and Margaret of Préaux.

== Life ==
Louis took part at the Battle of Agincourt and he was one of the captains that commanded the left wing of the French army, which was composed by 800 knights. However, he died during the battle. He was childless and he was succeeded by his brother, Peter of Bourbon-Préaux.
