= Eudo Dapifer =

11th and 12th-century Norman nobleman and royal official in England

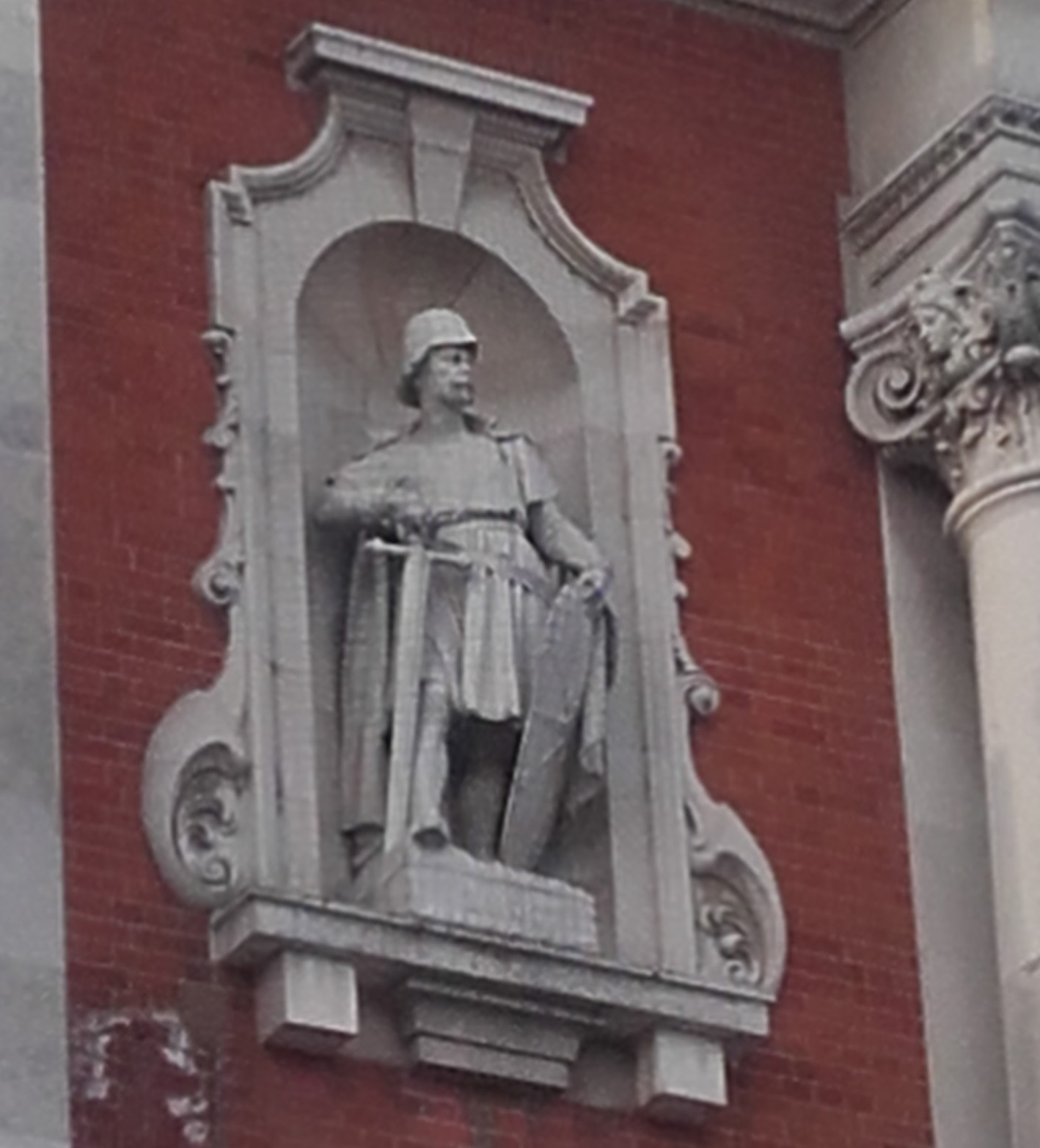
A marble statue by L. J. Watts depicting Eudo on the south façade of Colchester Town Hall in Essex, completed in 1902.

Eudo Dapifer (sometimes Eudo fitzHerbert and Eudo de Rie); (died 1120), was a Norman aristocrat who served as a steward (server, Latin 'dapifer') under the kings William the Conqueror, William II Rufus, and Henry I.

== Life ==
Eudo was the fourth son of Hubert of Ryes, who is legendarily known as the loyal vassal who hosted Duke William of Normandy prior to his flight from Valognes during a revolt in 1047.

Eudo's brothers were Ralph, Robert, Bishop of Séez, Hubert, William, and Adam. A sister, Albreda, was married to Peter de Valognes. There was also another sister, named Muriel, who was married to Osbert.

Eudo is known as "dapifer" because of his position as a steward (Note: The household office of steward (sewer, or dapifer) in the mid to late eleventh century had not yet evolved into the great office of state, later called the Lord High Steward. It paralleled the dapifer’s position in the French court, that of a chef-du-service, or server at the royal banquet table. The rapid rise to prominence of the dapifer in the English court was more due to the officers themselves than the position they held. See Harcourt, His Grace The Steward, pp. 5-6.) or server which in Latin is "dapifer".

=== Service in England ===
==== William the Conqueror ====
There is no evidence of Eudo having been at the Battle of Hastings in 1066, although some have speculated that Wace may have designated him as the Sire de Préaux which Eudo was in possession of by 1070. After the Norman Conquest of England all five brothers and their father were in England.

Eudo's brother Ralph was named Castellan of Nottingham, Hubert had custody of Norwich Castle, and Adam was one of the commissioners of the Domesday Survey in 1085. Eudo received lands in Essex, Hertfordshire, Berkshire, Bedfordshire, Northamptonshire, Cambridgeshire, Huntingdonshire, Hampshire, Norfolk and in Suffolk; as well as being a steward in the English royal household by at least 1072. Sometime after the Domesday Survey he inherited the lands of his brother Adam, held of Odo, Bishop of Bayeux, and those of his brother William at Bardley, Hertfordshire. He was involved in the building of Colchester Castle, the largest Norman keep built and the first stone keep in England, becoming its custodian until his death, when it reverted to Crown ownership.

==== William II ====
Eudo was present at Rouen for the death of King William, and then accompanied the new king, William II of England to England; securing for him the royal castles at Dover, Pevensey, and Hastings.

Eudo was a steward to William II also, and was one of the early adherents, witnessing charters and serving in the royal household. In 1096/7 Eudo founded Colchester Abbey, as well as St Mary Magdalene's Hospital in Colchester. During William II's reign, Eudo witnessed 27 royal writs. The historian Francis West, who studied the office of the justiciarship, asserts that Eudo, along with Haimo and Urse d'Abetot, as well as Ranulf Flambard, could be considered the first English justiciars, a position that the historian Emma Mason has modified towards them being the first barons of the exchequer. By that time Eudo's position was so powerful that he was able to impede efforts by the monks of Westminster Abbey to recover a church in London that had previously belonged to the abbey but had been alienated.

==== Henry I ====
Eudo continued as a steward to King Henry I of England, William's younger brother who succeeded as king in 1100. Eudo was one of the witnesses to Henry's coronation charter, issued shortly after his coronation in August 1100. Eudo was also a royal witness to the treaty between Henry and his brother Robert Curthose in 1101. From his service to Henry, Eudo acquired more lands, including the town of Colchester and several manors. Eudo continued to be a frequent witness to the royal charters and writs, along with Urse and Haimo.

In 1103, Eudo's son-in-law William de Mandeville had lands confiscated which were then granted to Eudo. The punishment was likely for allowing Ranulf Flambard to escape from the Tower of London in 1101. In addition Henry I removed William de Mandeville as Constable of the Tower of London and appointed Eudo to the position.

== Death ==
Eudo died at Préaux in Normandy early in 1120, and was buried in the chapter-house of St John's Abbey, Colchester, which he had founded, on 28 February 1120. He left gifts to Colchester Abbey, including the manor of Brightlingsea. There is a statue of Eudo on Colchester Town Hall in honour of his service to the town.

== Family ==
Eudo was married to Rohais, daughter of Richard Fitz Gilbert, in about 1088. They had one daughter Margaret who married William de Mandeville and Ottiwel d'Avranches, the illegitimate son of Hugh d'Avranches, Earl of Chester. (Note: Some sources state that Eudo died childless, apparently basing this on the fact that his estates went to the king on his death.) She was the mother of Geoffrey de Mandeville, first Earl of Essex.
