= De Mandeville =

Surname

Arms of de Mandeville. Quarterly, or and gules

De Mandeville is the surname of an old Norman. The first recorded use of this surname comes from Geoffrey de Mandeville, Constable of the Tower of London. The de Mandeville family held lands in England and France.

== England ==
Geoffrey de Mandeville was a companion of William the Conqueror in 1066. Geoffrey obtained lands in Wiltshire, Essex and others and was appointed the Constable of the Tower of London.

The sons of Geoffrey Fitz Peter and Beatrice de Say adopted the surname of de Mandeville in the right of their mother as co-heiress of her grandfather Geoffrey de Mandeville, Earl of Essex, after that line ended.
