= Sir Thomas Butler, 12th Baronet =

Irish soldier (1910-1994)

Colonel Sir Thomas Butler, Bt CVO DSO OBE JP FRGS
- Butler in 1967

Resident Governor of the Tower of London and Keeper of the Jewel House
- In office 1967–1971
- Succeeded by: Sir Digby Raeburn

Personal details
- Born: Thomas Pierce Butler; 18 September 1910 County Carlow, Ireland
- Died: 9 April 1994 (aged 83)
- Spouse: Rosemary Liége Woodgate Davidson-Houston (m. 1937)
- Relations: James Wentworth Leigh (grandfather)
- Children: 3
- Parent(s): Sir Richard Butler, 11th Baronet; Alice Dudley Leigh
- Education: Harrow School
- Alma mater: Trinity College, Cambridge

Colonel Sir Thomas Pierce Butler, 12th Baronet CVO DSO OBE JP FRGS (18 September 1910 – 9 April 1994) was an Irish soldier. He was Resident Governor of the Tower of London from 1967 to 1971.

== Early life ==
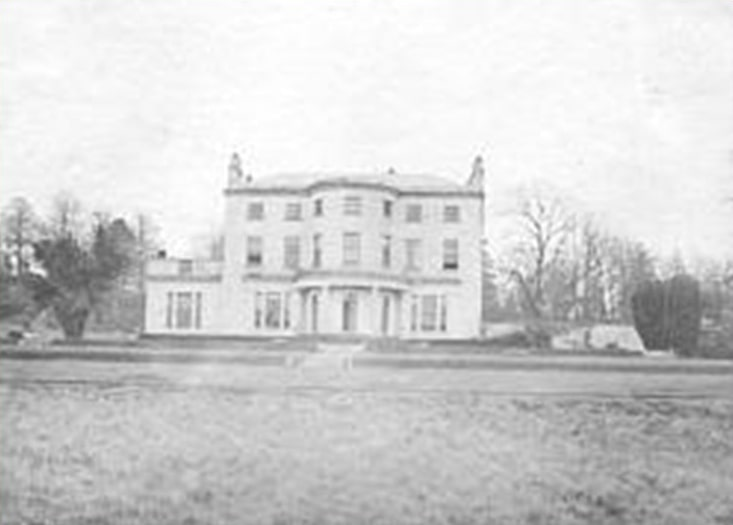
Ballintemple House, 1891

He was born in September 1910 in Carlow, where the Butler family settled in Carlow around 1500 at one time owning over 30,000 acres of land. He was the only son of Sir Richard Butler, 11th Baronet (1872–1955), the High Sheriff of Carlow in 1905, and Alice Dudley Leigh (daughter of the Very Rev. James Wentworth Leigh, Dean of Hereford and son of Chandos Leigh, 1st Baron Leigh).

His family home, known as Ballintemple House near Tullow, County Carlow, a three-story Georgian mansion with a five-bay entrance front burned down in 1917.

He was educated at Harrow School before graduating from Trinity College, Cambridge.

== Career ==
During World War II, Butler served with the Grenadier Guards and fought in France and Belgium. Following the surrender of Belgium, he managed to sail to England after withdrawing to France from Belgium with the surviving Guards battalions. He was later posted as an officer with the 6th Battalion Grenadier Guards to Damascus as part of the Western Desert. He was awarded the Distinguished Service Order for his gallantry during the Battle of the Mareth Line in March 1943. Butler was the commander of the company leading the attack on the German 90th Light Division of the Afrika Korps. Butler was taken prisoner along with two fellow officers, who were both killed when they attempted to escape, by the Germans. Butler himself made several attempts to escape but was not free until the surrender of Italy, when Butler and another officer managed to escape from the prisoner of war camp in Modena. Reportedly, Butler walked for over 400 miles, crisscrossing the Apennine Mountains before meeting the British Army.

In 1952, Butler was appointed Assistant Quartermaster General in London under Sir Ouvry Lindfield Roberts. In 1953 under the command of The Duke of Norfolk, Earl Marshal for the Coronation of Queen Elizabeth II, he was responsible "for administration and quartering of the 16,000 Commonwealth officers and troops who were in London to take part in the Coronation ceremony" and was invested as an Officer of the Order of the British Empire in 1954.

Following the death of his father in March 1955, Butler succeeded to the title 12th Baronet Butler of Cloughgrenan.

In 1957, he became Lieutenant Colonel in command of the Grenadier Guards. In that capacity, he travelled to Thailand as military advisor to the Thai Army. In 1959, he was appointed to head the defence staff of the High Commissioner in New Zealand under Sir Francis Cumming-Bruce.

In 1967, he became the Resident Governor of the Tower of London, overseeing the transfer of the Crown Jewels to the Jewel House. In 1968 he held the office of Keeper of the Jewel House. While in that post, he lived in the house which had been built for Anne Boleyn. In 1970, Butler was invested as a Commander, Royal Victorian Order before he retired as Governor in 1971.

=== Later life ===
Following his retirement, Butler and his family returned to Ballintemple. He served as an advisor to the Imperial War Museum in London and was the author of three books: Tower of London, Crown Jewels and Coronation Ritual (1982), The Crown Jewels and Coronation Ceremony (1989).

== Personal life ==
On 21 October 1937, Butler was married to Rosemary Liége Woodgate Davidson-Houston, daughter of Maj. James Hamilton Davidson-Houston. Their home in London was demolished during a German air raid on the city. They also maintained a home at Ballintemple. They were the parents of two daughters and a son:

- Caroline Rosemary Butler (b. 1939), who married Maj.-Gen. Richard Keightley, son of Gen. Sir Charles Keightley, in 1958.
- Sir Richard Pierce Butler, 13th Baronet (b. 1940), who married Diana Borg, a daughter of Col. Stephen John Borg, in 1965.
- Virginia Pamela Liége Butler (b. 1949), who married Harold Michael Clunie Cunningham, High Sheriff of Clwyd, in 1970.

Sir Thomas died on 9 April 1994 while he was fishing on the River Slaney. He was succeeded by his only son Richard.

Baronetage of Ireland
| Preceded by Richard Pierce Butler | Baronet (of Cloughgrenan); 1955 – 1994 | Succeeded by Richard Pierce Butler |
