= Resident Governor of the Tower of London and Keeper of the Jewel House =

Royal palace official in the UK

The Resident Governor of the Tower of London and Keeper of the Jewel House is responsible for the day-to-day running of the Tower of London.

The offices of Resident Governor of the Tower of London and Keeper of the Jewel House were amalgamated in 1967. The King's House located within the close of the Tower of London is the home of the Resident Governor.

The Constable of the Tower, a ceremonial appointment, who historically was in charge of the military operation of the Tower, is the most senior appointment at the Tower of London. When the monarch's Lord Chamberlain symbolically hands the palace over to an incoming Constable, the Constable in turn entrusts the palace to the Resident Governor.

== List of combined office holders ==
List of combined office holders:

- 1967: Colonel Sir Thomas Pierce Butler
- 1971: Major General Sir Digby Raeburn
- 1979: Major General Giles Mills
- 1984: Major General Andrew Patrick Withy MacLellan
- 1989: Major General Christopher Tyler
- 1994: Major General Geoffrey Field
- 2006: Major General Keith Cima
- 2011: Colonel Richard Harrold
- 2019: Brigadier Andrew Jackson

== See also ==
- Jewel House
