= Chicksands Priory =

Former monastic house in Bedfordshire, England

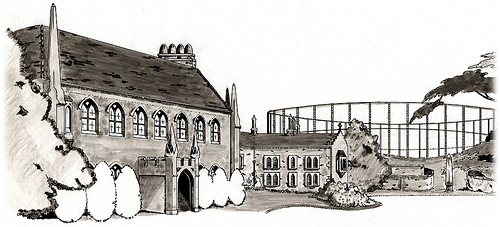

Religion
- Affiliation: Christianity
- Sect: Gilbertine Order
- Province: Bedfordshire
- Ownership: Rohese de Vere, Countess of Essex and Payn de Beauchamp, Baron of Bedford; Snow family (1576-1936); Crown Commissioners (1936-present)

Location
- Country: England
- Interactive map of Chicksands Priory
- Coordinates: 52°2′26.520″N 0°21′57.845″W

Architecture
- Founder: Rohese de Vere, Countess of Essex and Payn de Beauchamp, Baron of Bedford
- Established: 1152
- Listed Building – Grade I

Chicksands Priory is a former monastic house at Chicksands in Bedfordshire.

== History ==
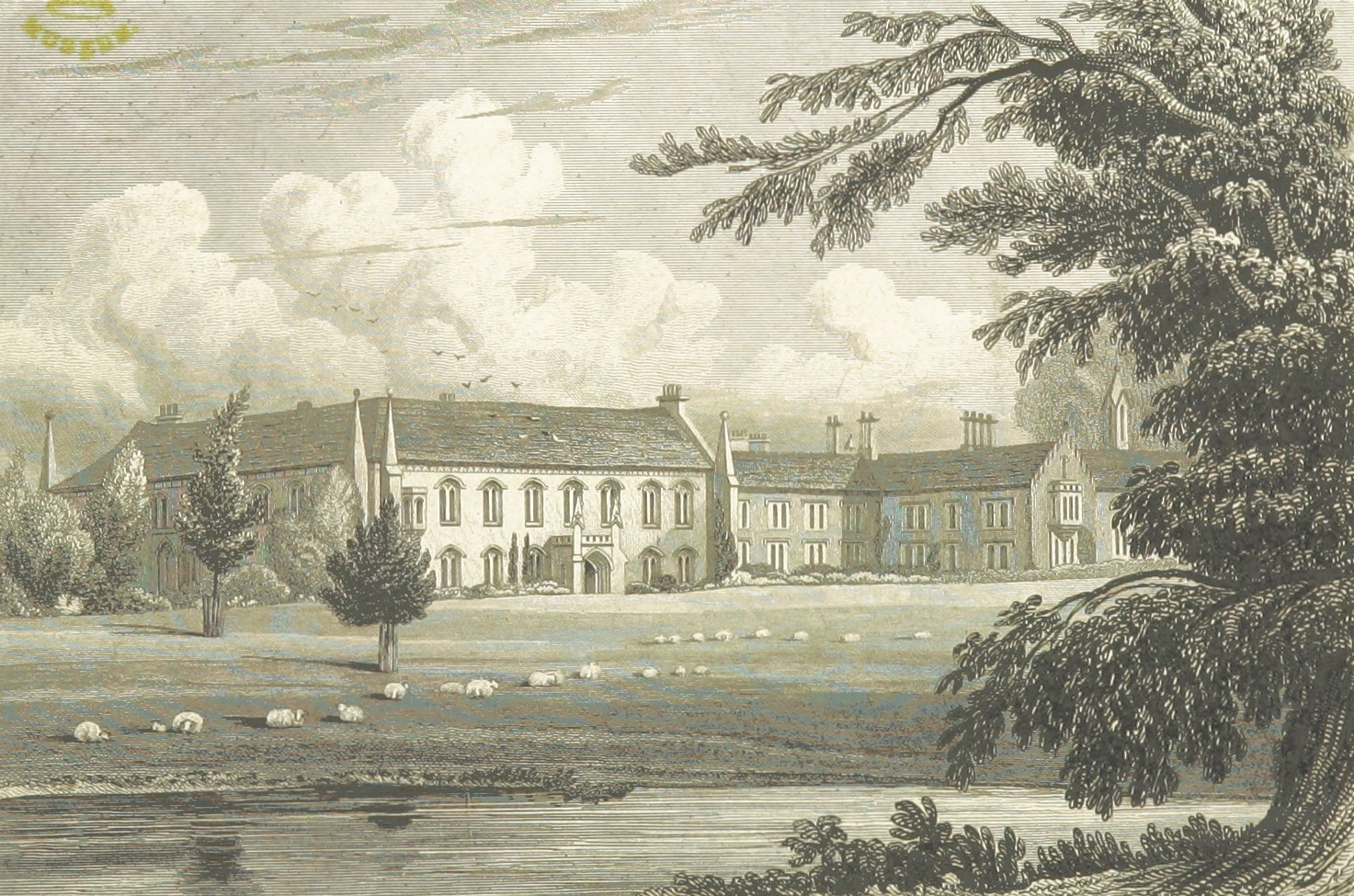
c. 1829 engraving of Chicksand Priory

The Gilbertine priory of Chicksands was founded about 1152 by Rohese, Countess of Essex, and her second husband Payn de Beauchamp, Baron of Bedford. Payn and Rohese endowed the priory at its foundation with the church of Chicksands and other Bedfordshire lands. The priory was of the Gilbertine Order, a religious order formed by Gilbert of Sempringham (c. 1083–1189). It was only one of ten religious houses in England that housed both nuns and canons. By 1200 it was one of the largest and wealthiest Gilbertine houses. Fleeing the wrath of King Henry II after the Council of Northampton in 1164, Archbishop Thomas Becket is said to have spent a short time at Chicksands Priory on his way out of England.

After the Dissolution of the Monasteries in the sixteenth century, the priory passed to the Snowe family and then in 1576 to the Osborne family, who owned it for almost 400 years. Chicksands was the residence of the famous letter-writer Dorothy Osborne between her birth in 1627 and her marriage in 1654. Elements of the original building remain, but it has been altered over the years, not least in 1740 by the architect Isaac Ware and in 1813 by James Wyatt, who designed the entrance hall, staircase and porch in the Gothic Revival style. Sir George Osborne's collection of "antiquities, old glass and great paintings" are mentioned "in his home at Chicksands Priory" by Arthur Mee in his 1939 volume on Huntingdon and Bedfordshire.

The Crown Commissioners bought the Chicksands Priory estate on 15 April 1936, later renting it to Gerald Bagshawe, who lived there until it was requisitioned by the Royal Navy. In 1940, after a few months of naval occupation, the RAF followed and it became known, firstly, as RAF Chicksands Priory. In 1950 the United States Air Force took over and continued on the site as a "listening post" until September 1995. Chicksands Priory is a Grade I listed building. The group "Friends of Chicksands Priory" was established in 1975 and tours of the building were offered to the general public until the summer of 1996. They returned to reopen the priory, following intense restoration during 1997 and 1998, in the spring of 1999.

There were reports, at the time that the USAF pulled out of the base, in the local press ("The Comet") and local radio (BBC Three Counties Radio) that some of the departing personnel were taking "souvenirs" from the old buildings, causing damage and loss. Neither the US nor the British authorities would confirm this.

In 2001 the Channel 4 television programme Time Team excavated sections of the site, uncovering part of what was believed to be the Infirmary cloister and several graves, and revealing possible details of the ground plan. The programme suggested that the Nuns' cloister lay under what is today a cobbled courtyard.

The gardens were restored again by a British Army team, beginning in November 2019.

== Burials ==
Burials at the priory included Rohese de Vere, Countess of Essex.

== See also ==
- List of monastic houses in Bedfordshire

Images

- Priory Entrance Hallway
- Chicksands Priory
