= Mandeville School =

Mandeville School may refer to:

- Mandeville High School, Mandeville, Louisiana
- Mandeville School, Aylesbury, England
- Mandeville JMI, Sawbridgeworth, England
- Mandeville Secondary School, Edmonton, England, now known as AIM North London Academy

== See also ==
- Mandeville (disambiguation)
