= William Faviell =

English cricketer

Personal information
- Full name: William Frederick Oliver Faviell
- Born: 5 June 1882; Loughton, Essex, England
- Died: 14 February 1950 (aged 67); Nairobi, Kenya
- Batting: Right-handed
- Role: Bowler

Domestic team information
- Years: Team
- 1903–1910: Essex

Career statistics
Competition	FC
Matches	14
Runs scored	241
Batting average	12.68
100s/50s	0/1
Top score	66*
Balls bowled
Wickets	10
Bowling average	26.10
5 wickets in innings	0
10 wickets in match	0
Best bowling	3/40
Catches/stumpings	11/0
- Source: Cricinfo, 22 July 2013

William Frederick Oliver Faviell (5 June 1882 – 4 February 1950) was a British Army officer and cricketer who played for Essex between 1903 and 1910. He was the Resident Governor of the Tower of London from 1933 until his retirement in 1945.

== Military career ==
Faviell was commissioned into the 3rd (Militia) Battalion of the East Surrey Regiment in November 1900. He received a commission in the regular army as a second lieutenant in the Worcestershire Regiment on 30 April 1902, and was stationed with his battalion in Orange River Colony to secure the peace after the end of the Second Boer War in June 1902. He left Cape Town for the United Kingdom four months later, on the SS Orient which arrived at Southampton in November 1902.

He was seconded for service with the Indian Army in January 1903, and spent most of the years until 1914 with the regiment's Second Battalion in South Africa and India, before returning to England. In September 1915, he participated in the Landing at Suvla Bay, and in November of that year took of command of the 9th Battalion. In 1918, by then Commander of the 39th Brigade, a part of the Dunsterforce, he took part in the evacuation of Baku. Faviell was later in the Queen's Royal Regiment, before returning to his old Regiment in 1927. He went with the 1st Battalion to Allahabad and Shanghai before returning home in 1931. In 1933 he was appointed Major and Resident Governor of the Tower of London, a position he held throughout World War II, before retiring.
