= Rohese de Vere, Countess of Essex =

Anglo-Norman noblewoman

Rohese de Vere, Countess of Essex (c. 1110 – 1170 or after) was a noblewoman in England in the Anglo-Norman and Angevin periods. Married twice, she and her second husband founded the Gilbertine monastery of Chicksands in Bedfordshire.

== Life ==
Rohese was the daughter of Aubrey de Vere II and Adeliza de Clare. Her first husband was Geoffrey de Mandeville II. He became Earl of Essex in 1140 and Rohese thereafter was styled countess. Geoffrey rebelled against King Stephen late in 1143. Rohese's whereabouts during his rebellion are unknown; their eldest son seems to have been sent to Devizes, a stronghold of the supporters of the Empress Matilda, while their second son may have been sent to the court of the count of Flanders. Rohese was widowed in 1144, when Geoffrey died an excommunicate rebel.

Rohese's second husband was Payn de Beauchamp, lord of Bedford, who had fought against King Stephen. The couple founded a double monastery at Chicksands, Bedfordshire, for nuns and canons of the Gilbertine Order. They had one son, Simon de Beauchamp II. Countess Rohese was widowed a second time in 1155 or early 1156 and gained the guardianship of her minor son. When he was near his majority, Countess Rohese and Simon converted St. Paul's, Bedford, from a house of canons secular to one of regular canons and moved them to Newnham, Bedfordshire.

According to the Walden Chronicle, when the countess's eldest son, Geoffrey de Mandeville III, earl of Essex, died in 1166, his men decided to take his body for burial at Walden Priory in Essex, founded by his father. Countess Rohese was at Chicksands Priory when a member of the entourage escorting the earl's body arrived to inform her of her son's death. He suggested that she send knights to seize the earl's body for burial at Chicksands. The countess rejected that suggestion, but when she later attended her son's funeral at Walden, she seized altar goods and other objects that her son had donated to Walden and gave them instead to Chicksands.

The countess almost certainly spent the remainder of her life at Chicksands Priory. She witnessed a charter of her son William de Mandeville, 3rd Earl of Essex in 1170, the last evidence of her life which can be dated, and when she died she was buried in the Chicksands chapter house and honoured as the priory's foundress.

Rohese, countess of Essex, is sometimes confused with another, contemporary 'Countess Rohese,' Rohese de Clare, who was the wife of Gilbert de Gant, Earl of Lincoln. The two women were first cousins through their mothers.

== Children ==
By her first marriage, Rohese and Geoffrey had:

- Geoffrey III, 2nd Earl of Essex (d. October 1166)
- William de Mandeville, 3rd Earl of Essex (d. 1189)
- Robert de Mandeville (d. before 1189)

By her second marriage, Rohese and Payn had:

- Simon de Beauchamp, lord of Bedford (d. 1206)

While Earl Geoffrey's eldest son Ernulf de Mandeville is sometimes listed as the child of Countess Rohese, there is strong evidence that Ernulf was the earl's illegitimate son, born before Geoffrey's marriage to Rohese.

== Sources ==
- Cokayne, G. E. Complete Peerage of England, Scotland, Ireland, Great Britain and the United Kingdom vol. X: Appendix J:116
- Crouch, David (1992). The Image of Aristocracy in Britain, 1000–1300. Routledge.
- Faulkner, Kathryn (2004). "Beauchamp, de, family (per. c. 1080–c. 1265)". Oxford Dictionary of National Biography (online ed.). Oxford University Press. doi:10.1093/ref:odnb/54497. (Subscription, Wikipedia Library access or UK public library membership required.)
- Green, Judith A. (2016). "The Charters of Geoffrey de Mandeville". Rulership and Rebellion in the Anglo-Norman World, c.1066-c.1216: Essay in Honour of Professor Edmund King. Routledge. pp. 91–110.
- Shirley, Kevin L. (2004). The Secular Jurisdiction of Monasteries in Anglo-Norman and Angevin England. Boydell Press.
- Wilson, Christopher (2010). "Gothic Architecture Transplanted: the Nave of the Temple Church in London". In Griffith-Jones, Robin; Park, David (eds.). The Temple Church in London: History, Architecture, Art. Boydell Press. pp. 19–44.
