= William de Mandeville =

Anglo-Norman baron

William de Mandeville (died before 1130) was an Anglo-Norman baron and Constable of the Tower of London.

== Life ==
William de Mandeville inherited the estates of his father Geoffrey de Mandeville, the Domesday tenant-in-chief, around 1100. He was Constable of the Tower of London at that time, and thus keeper of the first person known to be imprisoned there for political reasons, Ranulf Flambard. Flambard's escape in February 1101 would have significant consequences for William.

It is not known if William was in some way complicit in the escape of Flambard, or was simply a careless keeper. Regardless, as a punishment, Henry I confiscated the three richest of William's Essex estates, Sawbridgeworth, Saffron Walden, and Great Waltham in 1103, comprising about a third of his entire holdings, as well as the constableship giving them to Eudo Dapifer, William’s father-in-law. Little is known of William's activities after this.

William married Margaret, daughter of Eudo FitzHubert (Dapifer) and Rohese de Clare. Widowed, Margaret married secondly Othuer fitz Earl (d. 1120), illegitimate son of Hugh d'Avranches, 1st Earl of Chester. William and Margaret's son Geoffrey de Mandeville would recover the seized estates and the constableship during the reign of King Stephen.

== Family ==
- Geoffrey de Mandeville, 1st Earl of Essex (d. 1144)
- Beatrice de Mandeville (d. 19 Apr. 1197), married William de Say (d. Aug. 1144). Their granddaughter Beatrice de Say took some of the Mandeville inheritance to her husband, Geoffrey fitz Peter.

== Additional references ==
Peerage of England
Preceded by Geoffrey de Mandeville	Constable of the Tower of London; 1100-1103	Succeeded by Eudo Dapifer
