= Digby Raeburn =

Major-General Sir William Digby Manifold Raeburn, KCVO, CB, DSO, MBE (1915–2001) was a senior British Army officer. He was Resident Governor of the Tower of London from 1971 to 1979.

== Early life and education ==
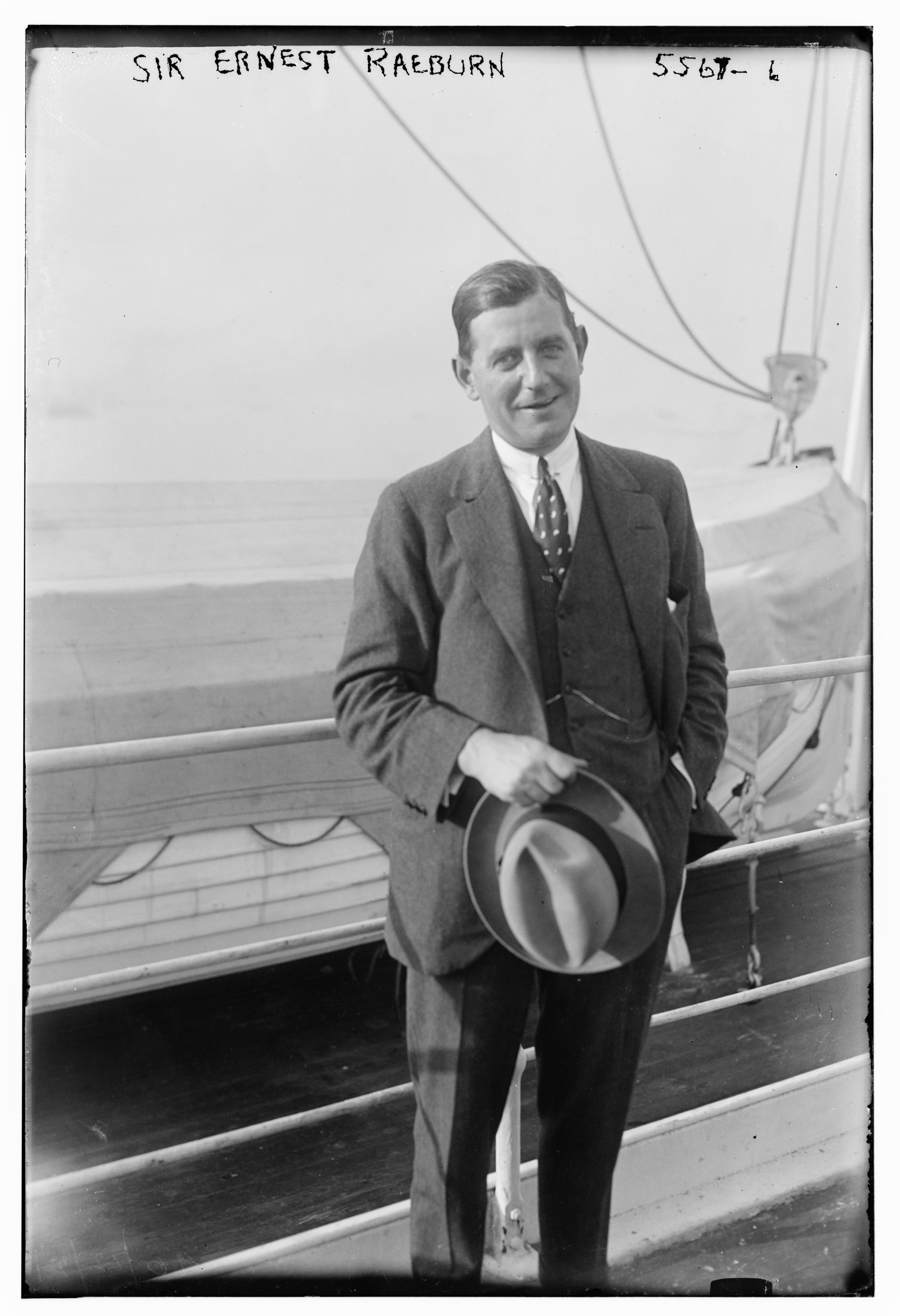
Sir Ernest Raeburn

Born on 6 August 1915, Raeburn was the son of Sir Ernest Manifold Raeburn, KBE, who was a diplomat and himself a younger son of the shipowner and politician Sir William Raeburn, 1st Baronet. Raeburn's mother was Greta Mary Alison, née Watson, the daughter of an engineering officer in the Royal Navy. He attended Winchester College and then Magdalene College, Cambridge, graduating with a first-class degree in history.

== Military service ==
Raeburn was commissioned into the Scots Guards in 1936. During the Second World War, he was posted to Egypt in 1940 and transferred to the General Headquarters in Cairo to serve in intelligence (he could speak fluent German) and was appointed an MBE in 1941. He then worked in the Eighth Army's headquarters in 1942, before subsequently returning to the headquarters in Cairo as deputy director of Military Intelligence with the rank of colonel. As the war turned in favour of the Allies in North Africa, Raeburn was involved in the British deception operations to convince the German forces that the Allies were planning to land in Sardinia and Greece when in fact they were planning to invade Sicily. From 1943 to 1944, he was placed in command of a company of the 2nd Scots Guards in Italy. He then served in North West Europe, where he commanded a battle group that took two key bridges at Nordhorn and, amid intense fighting, led a group across the Ems at Lingen and held the position for half a day, until he was relieved. He received the Distinguished Service Order in 1945.

After the war, Raeburn attended the Staff College at Camberley. He held the command of the 1st Scots Guards in the British Army of the Rhine from 1953 to 1956 and a division at the staff college from 1956 to 1957, then from 1958 to 1959 he was lieutenant-colonel commanding the Scots Guards, and from 1959 to 1960 he commanded the 1st Guards Brigade Group, and then from 1960 to 1963 the 51st Infantry Brigade Group. In 1963, he was appointed Director of Combat Development (Army) at the Ministry of Defence, and was promoted to major-general. In 1965, he was appointed Chief of Staff to the NATO Headquarters Allied Forces Northern Europe, a post he held until 1968. He was appointed a Companion of the Order of the Bath in 1966.

== Later life ==
Raeburn retired from the Army in 1970. The next year he was appointed Resident Governor and Keeper of the Jewel House at the Tower of London. He held the office until 1979 and was appointed a Knight Commander of the Royal Victorian Order that year. A keen skier (a skill he developed during childhood trips to Switzerland), Raeburn was married to the Olympic skier Adeline Pryor. They did not have any children. He died on 8 December 2001.
