= Hugh de Beauchamp (sheriff) =

11th and 12th-century Norman nobleman and sheriff in England

Sheriff of Buckinghamshire
- In office before 1089 – after 1095

Personal details
- Spouse: Matilda
- Children: Simon, Robert

Hugh de Beauchamp (sometimes Hugh of Beauchamp; died after 1100) was a Norman who held lands in England after the Norman Conquest.

== Background ==
Hugh may have been from Beauchamps in Normandy or perhaps from Calvados. No connection has been established between Hugh and Walter de Beauchamp, founder of the Beauchamp family which later acquired the Earldom of Warwick.

== Career ==
Hugh was a tenant-in-chief with landholdings in Bedfordshire. These lands have been considered to have made him the first feudal baron of Bedford. At the time of the Domesday Book he held 43 manors in Bedfordshire and additional landholdings in Buckinghamshire and Hertfordshire. The core of Hugh's lands were those held before the Conquest by Eskil of Ware and men sworn to Eskil, with additional lands coming from thegns and sokemen in the county.

Hugh witnessed a charter of King William the Conqueror, which can only be dated to sometime between 1070 and 1089, where he is named as "sheriff", but it is unclear whether he was sheriff of Buckinghamshire or of Bedfordshire. Judith A. Green argues that it is more likely that he was sheriff of Buckinghamshire. Frank Barlow also assigns that office to Hugh in the early part of the reign of King William II. Katharine Keats-Rohan, however, claims that he was sheriff of Bedfordshire. Hugh also appears in the reign of William II as the sheriff of Buckinghamshire on a charter dating to between 1087 and 1095 as well as a charter from 1087.

== Death and legacy ==
Hugh lived into the reign of King Henry I, as Henry's queen, Matilda, gave a manor to Hugh. This grant can only be dated to sometime between 1100 and 1118. Hugh in March 1101 was also a surety for Henry in a treaty between the new king and Robert II, Count of Flanders.

Hugh married Matilda. She was probably the daughter and heiress of Ralf Tallebosc (or Ralph Taillebois), who was sheriff of Buckinghamshire before Hugh. Hugh probably had two sons – Simon and Robert. Simon was probably the elder son. Matilda is named as Simon's mother in a document dating to around 1124 to 1130.,
