= Mandeville, West Virginia =

- Unincorporated community
- Location within West Virginia Location within the United States
- Coordinates: 37°29′44″N 80°49′21″W
- Country: United States
- State: West Virginia
- County: Summers
- Elevation: 1,732 ft (528 m)
- Time zone: UTC-5 (Eastern (EST))
  - Summer (DST): UTC-4 (EDT)
- Area codes: 304 & 681
- GNIS feature ID: 1555035

Mandeville is an unincorporated community in Summers County, West Virginia, United States. Mandeville is located near the east bank of the New River, 20 miles (32 km) south of Hinton.

The community derives its name from Joseph Manderville, a local landowner.
