= John Mandeville (disambiguation) =

John Mandeville was the putative author of the 14th-century travel book, The Travels of Sir John Mandeville.

John Mandeville may also refer to:

- John Mandeville (priest) (1655–1725), Church of England prelate
- John Mandeville (Land Leaguer) (1849–1888), Irish agrarian agitator
