= Magneville =

- Commune
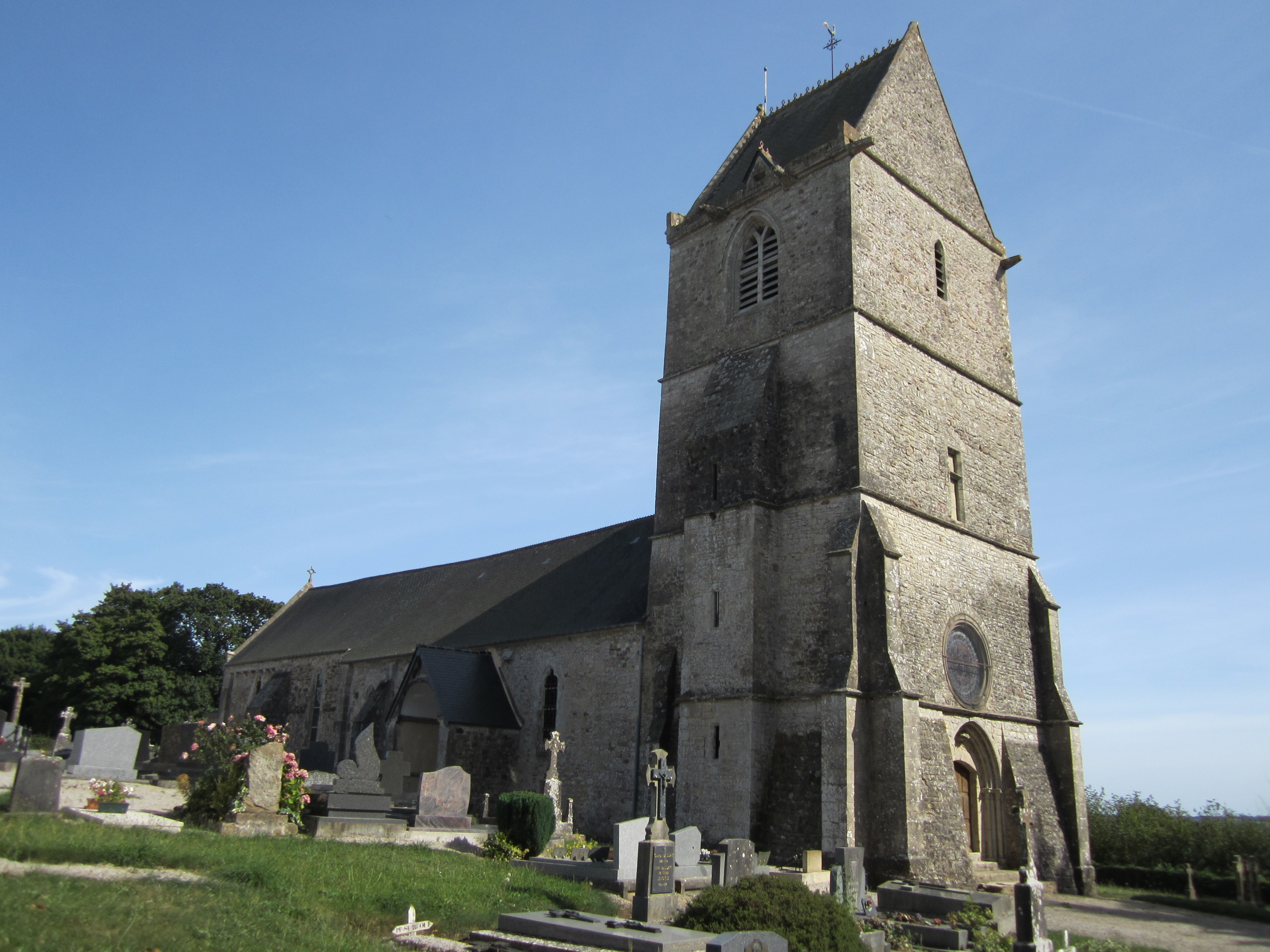
- The church of Notre-Dame
- Location of Magneville
- Location within France Location within Normandy
- Coordinates: 49°26′54″N 1°32′41″W
- Country: France
- Region: Normandy
- Department: Manche
- Arrondissement: Cherbourg
- Canton: Bricquebec-en-Cotentin
- Intercommunality: CA Cotentin

Government
  - Mayor (2020–2026): Maurice Duchemin
- Area^{1}: 9.49 km^{2} (3.66 sq mi)
- Elevation: 42 m (138 ft)
- Highest elevation: 51 m (167 ft)
- Lowest elevation: 6 m (20 ft)
- Population (2023): 321
  - Density: 33.8/km^{2} (87.6/sq mi)
- Time zone: UTC+01:00 (CET)
  - Summer (DST): UTC+02:00 (CEST)
- INSEE/Postal code: 50285 /50260
- ^{1} French Land Register data, which excludes lakes, ponds, glaciers > 1 km^{2} (0.386 sq mi or 247 acres) and river estuaries.

Magneville (French pronunciation: [maɲvil]) is a commune in the Manche department in Normandy in north-western France.

== See also ==
- Communes of the Manche department
