= J. O. Prestwich =

British medievalist, 1914–2003

John Oswald Prestwich (26 June 1914 – 25 January 2003), nicknamed "Jop", was an English medieval historian and fellow of Queen's College, Oxford. During the Second World War, he worked as a code breaker at Bletchley Park.

== Life ==
Prestwich was born on 26 June 1914 in Leigh, Lancashire, England. He was educated at the Sedbergh School, then an all-boys private boarding school in Cumbria. In 1933, he matriculated into Hertford College, Oxford.

Following graduation, he held a prize fellowship at Magdalen College, Oxford. In 1937, he was elected a fellow of Queen's College, Oxford.

On 2 November 1940, having attended an Officer Cadet Training Unit, he was commissioned as a second lieutenant in the Oxfordshire and Buckinghamshire Light Infantry, British Army. Like other academics, he worked at Bletchley Park as a code breaker, taking advantage of his fluency in German. He recalled later:

Alamein was marvellous, because you had these desperate messages from Rommel saying 'Panzer Army is exhausted, we've enough petrol for 50 kilometres, ammunition is contemptible' and so on.

In 1938, Prestwich married Menna Roberts, who was a historian of the 16th and 17th centuries and fellow of St Hilda's College, Oxford. She died in 1990. He retired in 1981 to Old Headington and died in 2003. He was survived by his son, Michael Prestwich, who is also a medieval historian.

== Scholarship ==
Prestwich's work focused on England in the 11th and 12th centuries. According to medievalist Lorraine Attreed at the College of the Holy Cross, although his small scholarly output is often noted, he had "towering influence" on the field. To Christopher Tyerman, he was "one of the most influential medievalists in Britain in the second half of the twentieth century".

In 1982–83, he gave the Ford Lectures at Oxford on "The Place of War in English History, 1066–1214". A book based on the lectures was edited by his son and published posthumously. The book also included an appendix containing a "spirited and effective demolition of feudalism as a useful or accurate description of anything that might have existed in the two centuries after the conquest".

== Partial list of publications ==
- "War and Finance in the Anglo-Norman State", Transactions of the Royal Historical Society 4:19–43 (December 1954) doi:10.2307/3678850
- "Anglo-Norman feudalism and the problem of continuity", Past & Present 26:39–57 (1963) JSTOR 649903
- "The military household of the Norman kings", The English Historical Review 96:378:1–35 (1981) JSTOR 568383
- The Place of War in English History, 1066–1214, 2004, ISBN 1843830981

== Bibliography ==
- "John Prestwich" (obituary), The Telegraph, February 7, 2003
- "John Prestwich" (obituary), The Sunday Times, February 18, 2003
- John Gillingham, James Clarke Holt, John O. Prestwich, War and Government in the Middle Ages: Essays in honour of JO Prestwich (festschrift), 1984
