= Imbert Pugeys =

Imbert Pugeys, or Imbert de Savoie, (died 1262) was a valet in the kings chamber who became constable at Hadleigh Castle in 1244 and Oxford Castle in 1253. Advancing further, from 1257, the Savoyard became a steward of the royal household of King Henry III of England and castellan of the Tower of London before eventually dying in 1262. His influence at court in 1262 is evidenced by his joining the Savoyard witness list for a charter relating to Queen Alianor’s dowry.

Imbert married Joan de Aguillon; their son gave the family name to what became Stoke Poges in Buckinghamshire.
