= Jewel House =

Vault housing the British Crown Jewels in the Tower of London

Coordinates: 51°30′29″N 0°4′34″W

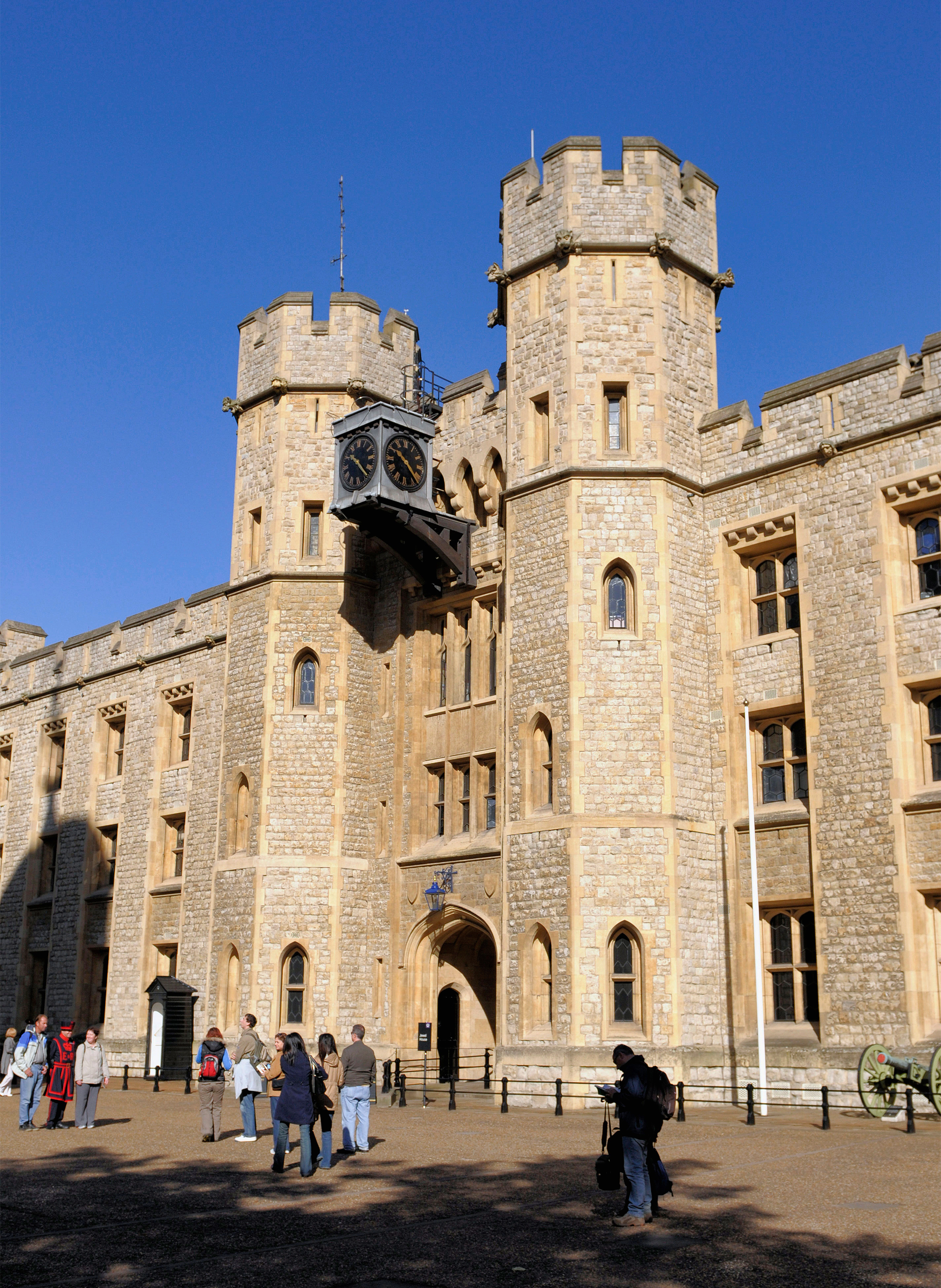
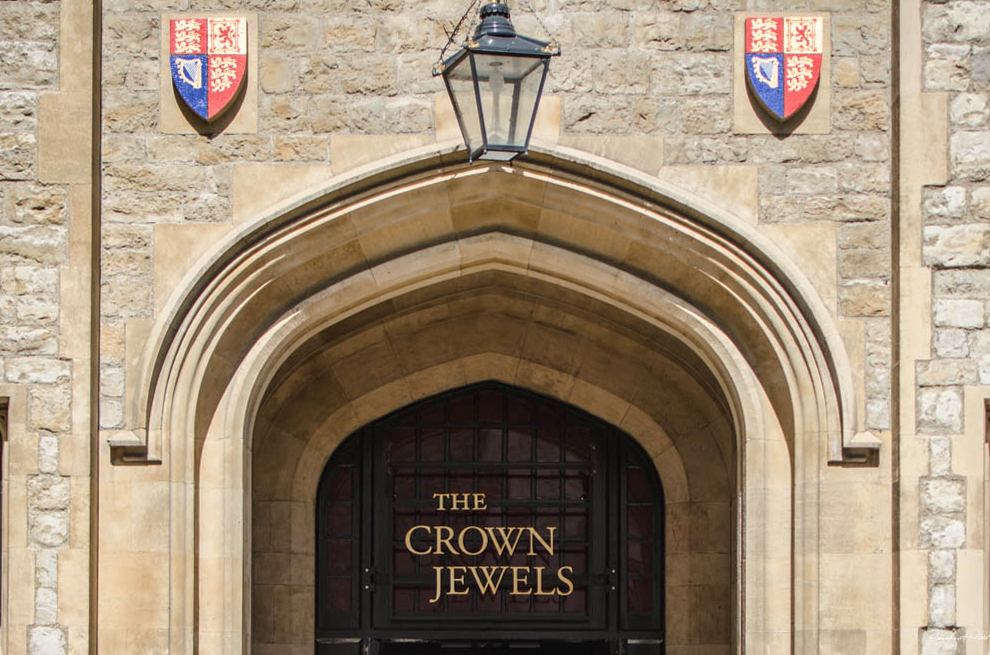
Entrance to the Jewel House

The Jewel House is a vault housing the British Crown Jewels in the Waterloo Block (formerly a barracks) at the Tower of London. It was opened by Queen Elizabeth II in 1994 and refurbished in 2012. Regalia have been kept in various parts of the Tower since the 14th century after a series of successful and attempted thefts at Westminster Abbey.

== History ==
=== Pre-17th century ===
A Keeper of the Crown Jewels was appointed in 1207. Over the subsequent centuries his title varied, from Keeper of the King's Jewels, Master of the Jewel House, Master and Treasurer of the King's Jewels and Plate, or Keeper of the Jewel House. He was also Treasurer of the Chamber, a division of the Royal Household of the monarch. In this position he was also called Keeper of the Court Wardrobe, Keeper of the Privy Wardrobe, or Receiver of the Chamber. In this capacity, he represented the Lord Treasurer's interests in the regalia, and the wardrobe and privy wardrobe. Because of this, the Receiver of the Chamber exercised delegated authority over the Crown Jewels, especially those kept at the Tower of London (these two positions were separated in 1485).

Although a treasury had been located in the Tower of London from the earliest times (as in the sub-crypt of St John's Chapel in the White Tower), from 1255 there was a separate Jewel House for state crowns and regalia, though not older crowns and regalia, in the grounds of Westminster Abbey. This Jewel House stood by the now-demolished Wardrobe Tower.

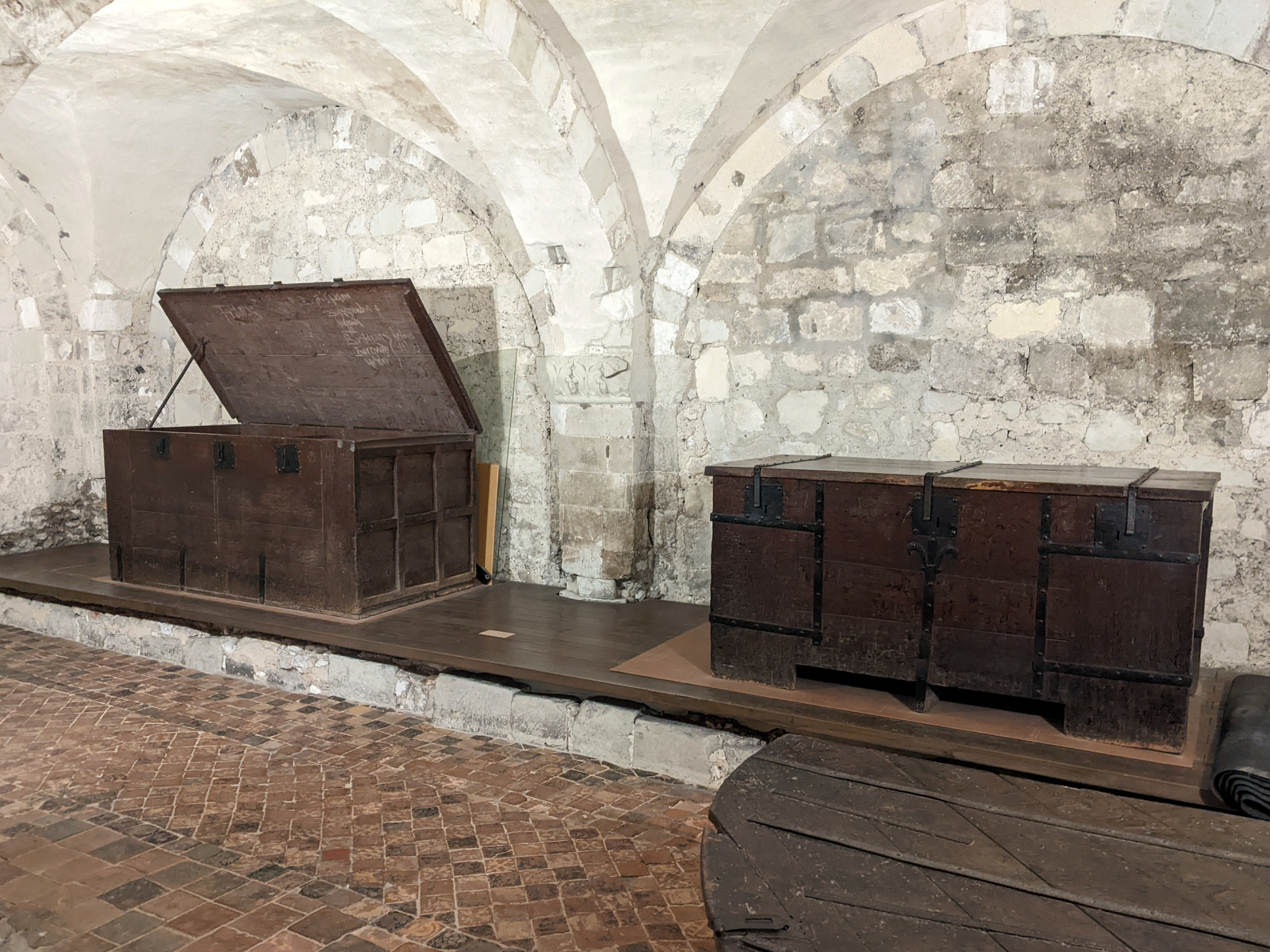
The Chamber of the Pyx, Westminster Abbey

In 1378, the keeper gained control over at least a part of the royal jewels, and had a box in which he kept them, with two keys: one for himself and the other for the Lord Treasurer. This was the beginning of the Jewel House Department. The royal treasure was usually kept in the Tower of London, and at the Great Treasury, Westminster. Additionally, coronation regalia was, over the centuries, kept in the Chamber of the Pyx in Westminster Abbey. From the foundation of the abbey in c. 1050 until 1303, the Chamber of the Pyx also held the general royal treasury. Most crowns were kept in the Tower of London from the time of Henry III, as were coronation regalia from 1643, except for some items which were in the abbey during the time of James II.

Following Richard de Podnecott's attempted robbery of the Chamber of the Pyx in 1303, some regalia were moved to the Tower of London for safekeeping. A new Jewel House was built near the White Tower in 1378. In the 1530s the Jewel House was rebuilt on the south side of the White Tower by James Nedeham, and the reserve of jewels and plate was now brought together. Regalia were kept on the upper floor and plate on the lower floor. The coronation regalia would remain at Westminster Abbey until the 17th century.

=== 1660–1814 ===
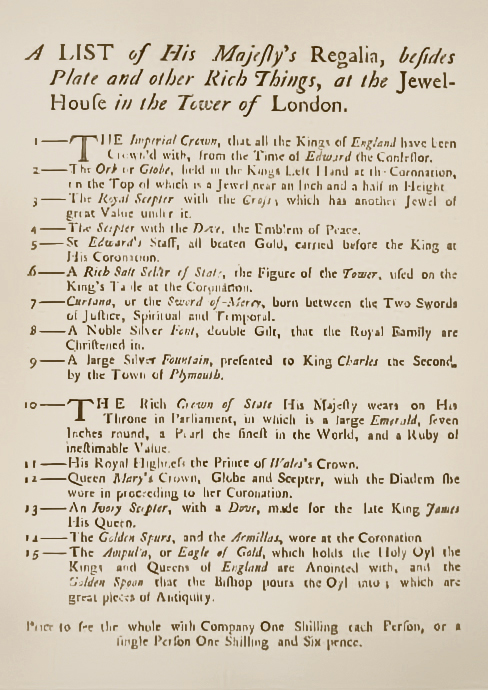
A copy of the first Crown Jewels 'guidebook', c. 1690

The first keeper (however styled) after the restoration of the monarchy in 1660, Sir Gilbert Talbot, was the last to exercise day-to-day control over the Jewel House. At that time, he was styled as Master and Treasurer of the Jewels and Plate. Spare plate was kept at the Palace of Whitehall, and later, probably, at St James's Palace. Very large quantities of spare plate were melted down and sold in 1680, and thereafter the Jewel House held comparatively little besides the items held at the Tower of London, though much of it was out on loan.

From 1660, as the Privy Wardrobe was no longer at the Tower of London, a caretaker was appointed as watchman for the Master of the Jewel House. He later became known as the Keeper of the Regalia or Keeper of the Jewel Office at the Tower. From this appointment, a separate branch of the Jewel House Department developed. When the latter was closed down, the Tower of London Jewel House alone remained. From 1665, the regalia were on show to the public, and over time this activity of the Jewel House became increasingly important.

In 1669, the regalia were moved to a new chamber in the Martin Tower. A custodian named Talbot Edwards showed the jewels to visitors for a small fee. At first, this was a very informal arrangement, with Edwards taking the regalia out of a locked cupboard to show it. The arrangement was ended in 1671, when Colonel Thomas Blood overpowered the custodian, tied him up and, with the help of three accomplices, made off with the Crown Jewels. All the items were recovered, though some had been damaged; St Edward's Crown had been crushed with a mallet, and the Sovereign's Orb took a dent.

Drastic changes followed: an armed guard was provided, the collection was put behind bars in a windowless room, and the first guidebook to the Crown Jewels was published, formally establishing it as a visitor attraction. People were locked inside the tower during their visit and only permitted to see the jewels from a distance. For a small fee, they could reach through the bars and touch some of the jewels.

In 1782, as part of a wider rationalisation of the Royal Household, the Department of the Jewel Office, under the Master of the Jewel Office, who was generally a senior politician, was abolished, and the Lord Chamberlain's Office took over the accounting functions, with an official called the Officer of the Jewels and Plate. From 1782 until 1814, there was only a resident caretaker to guard the regalia and other jewels at the Tower of London. In 1814, a Keeper of the Jewel House was appointed. He had a servant as "Exhibitor" (renamed Curator in 1921), responsible for the day-to-day custody of the jewels.

=== 1815–1966 ===
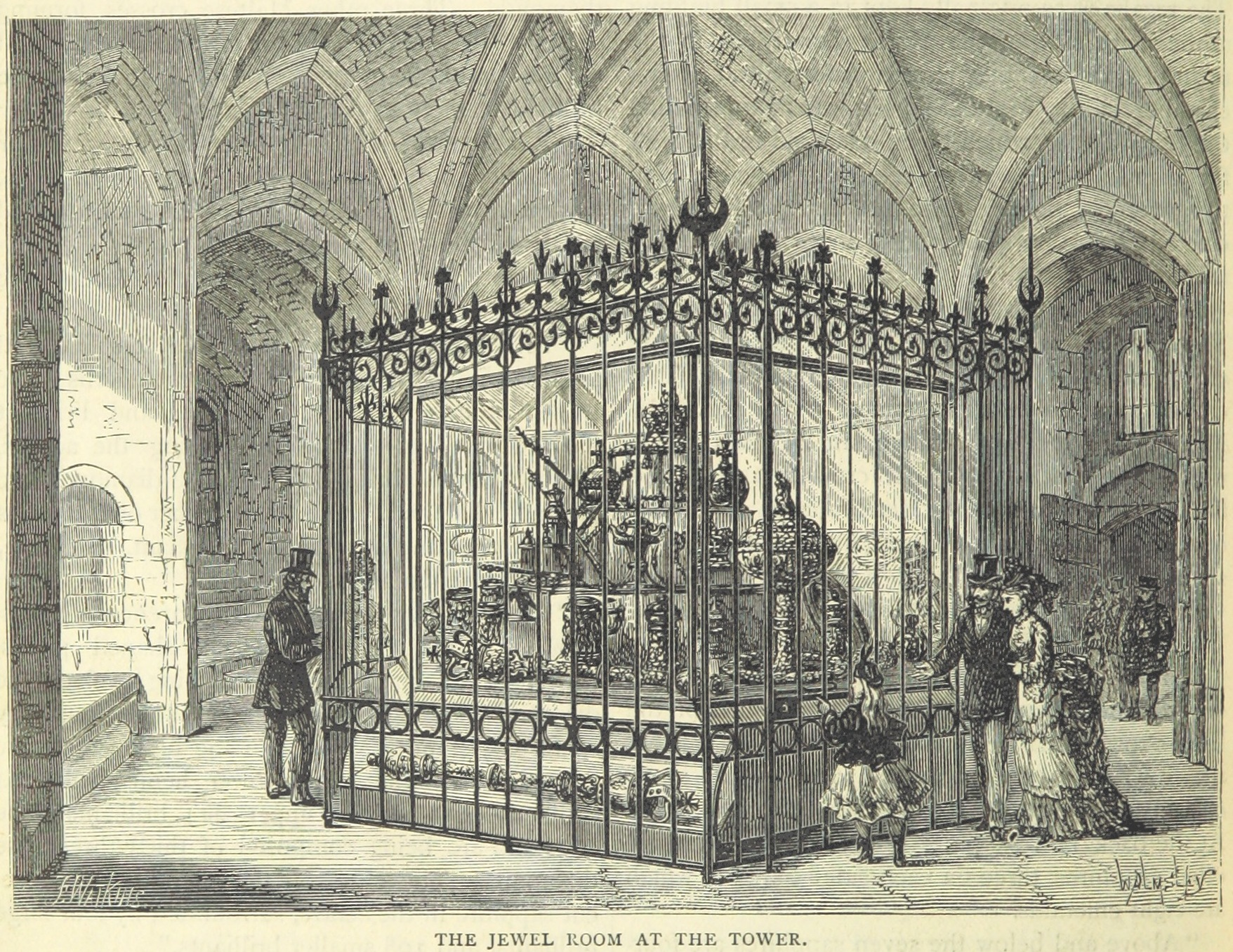
The Jewel Room of 1868

In 1815, a female visitor (later found insane) grabbed the State Crown and pulled it to bits, causing more than £10 worth of damage. This and the poor quality of the keeper's live-in accommodation led to an overhaul in 1816. A rail was installed to keep the public at a distance from the jewels, and the repaired State Crown and Exeter Salt were put in glass cases on revolving tables. The whole collection was lit by six powerful argand lamps.

By now, the Jewel House was a very lucrative business and, in the 1830s, the keeper earned £550 a year. When he lowered the entrance fee in 1838 in a bid to attract more visitors, his income soared to £1,500. Aghast, the Treasury, which received no money from the enterprise but paid for the upkeep of the jewels, began to make new arrangements. In 1840, they drew up plans for the construction of a new building in the Tower of London to house the collection, opened in 1842.

The Crown Jewels were displayed in glass cases in the middle of a room with large windows so that people could walk around them and see them more clearly. In 1852, the keeper was formally recognised as a member of the Royal Household and paid a fixed salary. Unfortunately, the new Jewel House building was judged to be a fire hazard, and so a new chamber was constructed on the upper floor of the Wakefield Tower in 1868 by the architect Anthony Salvin. Apart from their temporary removal during war, and for ceremonial use, the Crown Jewels remained there until 1967.

=== 1967–1993 ===
External videos
- News report on the 1967 Jewel House exhibition (British Pathé)

After the Second World War, the 19th century Jewel House was inadequate both in terms of security and public access. At peak times, 1,500 visitors a day were coming to see the jewels. The 1967 Jewel House was built in the west wing of the Waterloo Barracks at a cost of £360,000 and it was designed to cater for up to 5,000 visitors a day. An underground vault extending out under the lawns in front of the barracks housed the priceless coronation regalia, while the State Trumpets, maces and plate were displayed on the ground floor. Visitors walked down 49 steps to enter the concrete vault, said to be able to protect the Crown Jewels against a nuclear attack, and the regalia were in a large star-shaped case designed by the architect Alan Irvine, around which visitors proceeded clockwise under the supervision of wardens. A raised gallery 2 metres (7 ft) from the case allowed people to view the collection at a more leisurely pace.

An assistant curator had been appointed in 1963, and a second in 1968, when a new independent body of wardens and senior wardens was created to replace the former detail of Yeomen Warders of the Tower of London who had been responsible for the outward protection of the jewels. The post of Keeper of the Jewel House was combined with that of the Resident Governor of the Tower of London in 1968, and a Deputy Governor assumed much of his responsibilities. In 1990, the Jewel House and the Tower of London became the responsibility of the new Historic Royal Palaces agency.

=== 1994–2011 ===
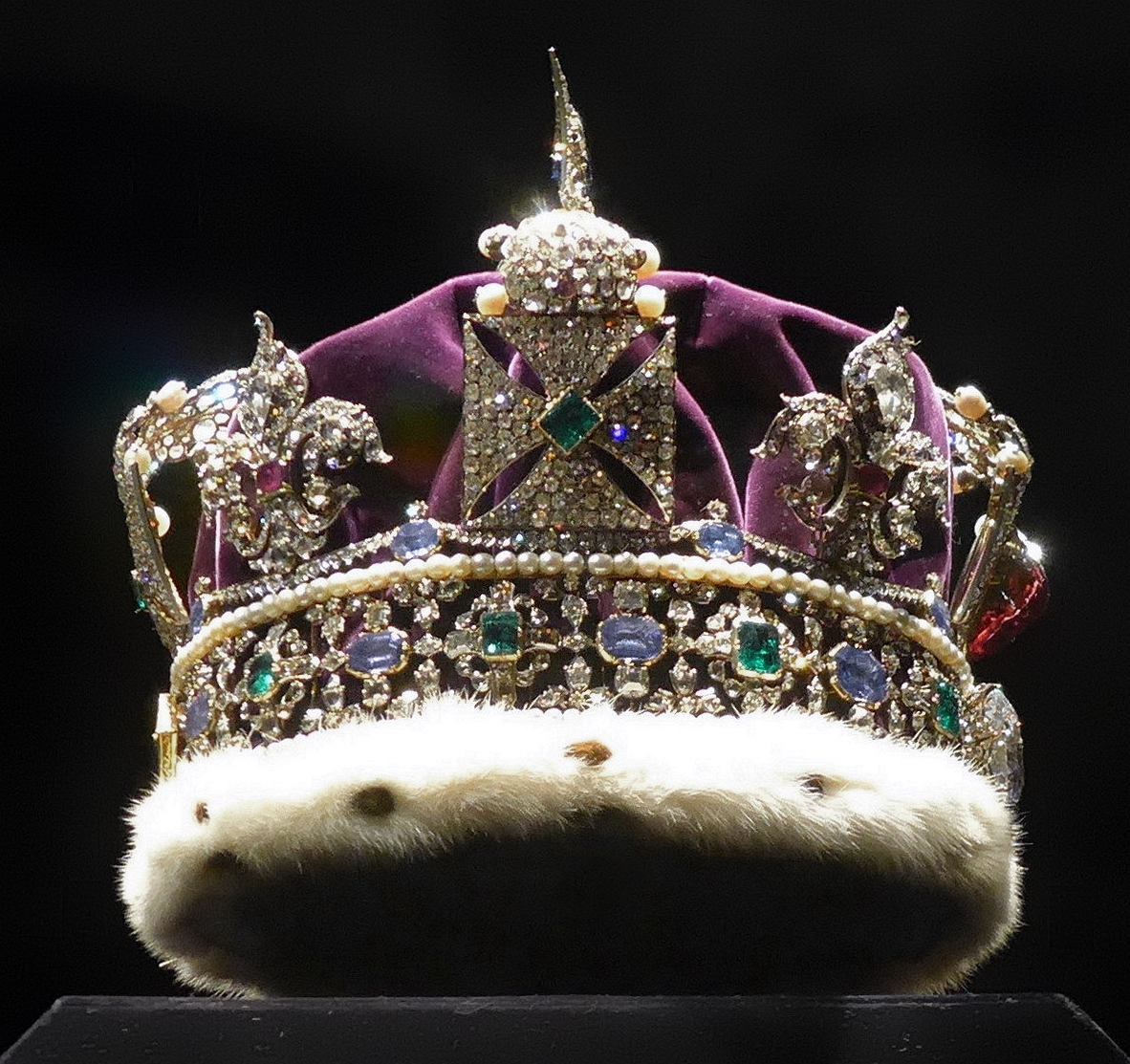
The Imperial State Crown

By the 1980s, up to 15,000 people a day were visiting the jewels, causing queues up to an hour long. The display had also begun to look old-fashioned; according to David Beeton, then CEO of Historic Royal Palaces, "they were displayed as if they were in a jeweller's shop window". In 1992, it was decided to bring the coronation regalia out of the underground vault and build a new Jewel House with larger capacity on the ground floor of the building at a cost of £10 million. Inspiration for the layout and presentation was taken from Disneyland, the Seville Expo and jewel houses across Europe.

Queen Elizabeth II opened the new Jewel House on 24 March 1994. It occupies almost the entire ground floor of the Waterloo Block (formerly a barracks) and is designed to allow up to 20,000 people a day to see the collection of more than 100 priceless objects and 23,578 diamonds, rubies, emeralds and sapphires. They were lit by state-of-the-art fibre optics and rested on French velvet.

However, critics derided the experience as "just an exercise in crowd management, beautifully lit and presented but literally mechanistic", a reference to the six-inch-thick, two-tonne steel doors, and the use of a travelator at peak times.

=== Present day ===
In 2012, the exhibit was given a £2.5 million revamp to include a new introduction area with a video showing the history of the Crown Jewels and explaining how they are used in the coronation ceremony. The jewels themselves are displayed in the order they are used in the ceremony, and Handel's coronation anthems can be heard as visitors tour the exhibition. Brighter lights were installed to present the jewels in a more natural way, and a new lift provides disabled access to the viewing platform. The Princess Royal officially reopened the Jewel House on 29 March 2012.

The underground vault built in 1967 is home to 25,000 architectural drawings of historic royal palaces.

== Security ==
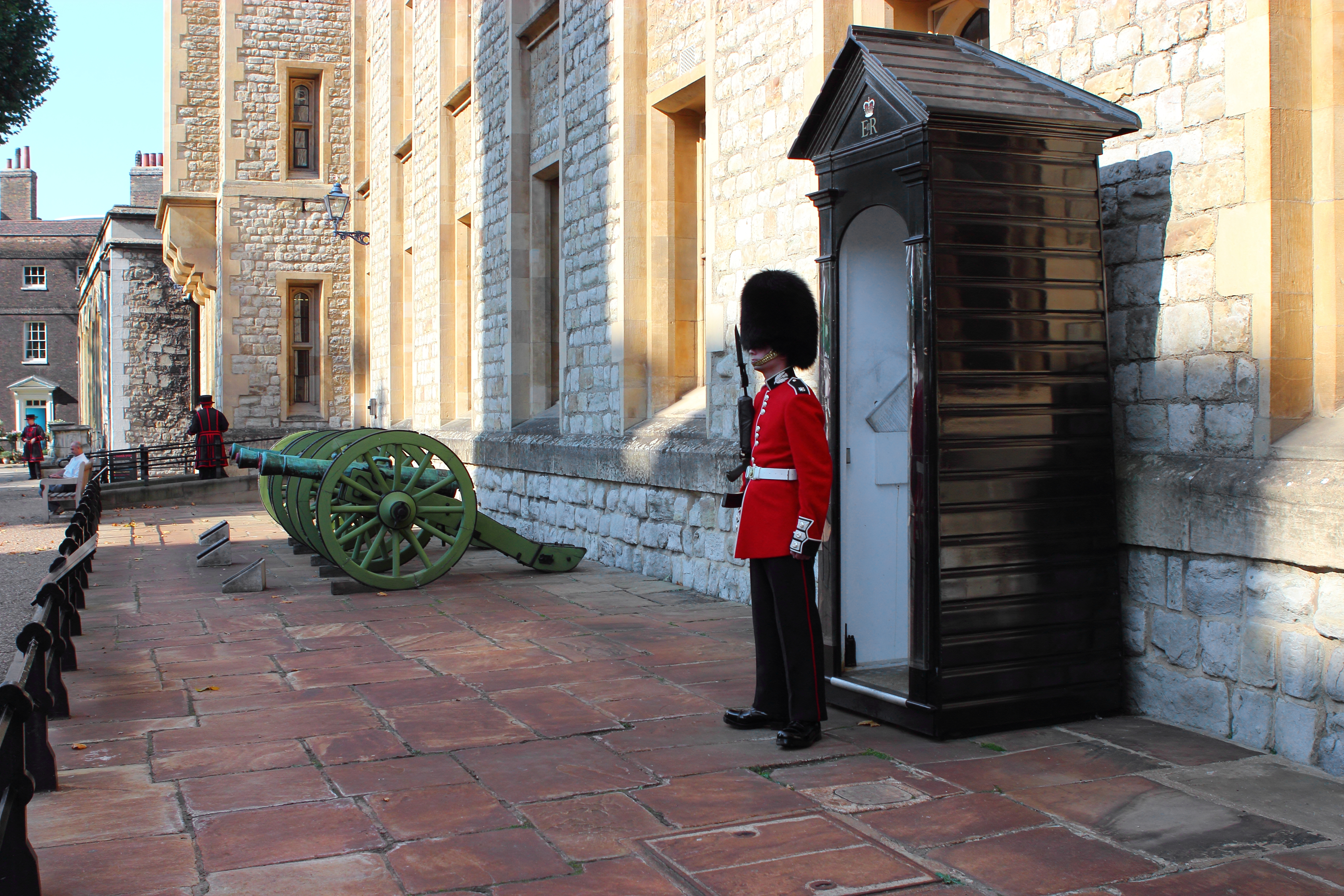
A Scots Guards sentry outside the Jewel House

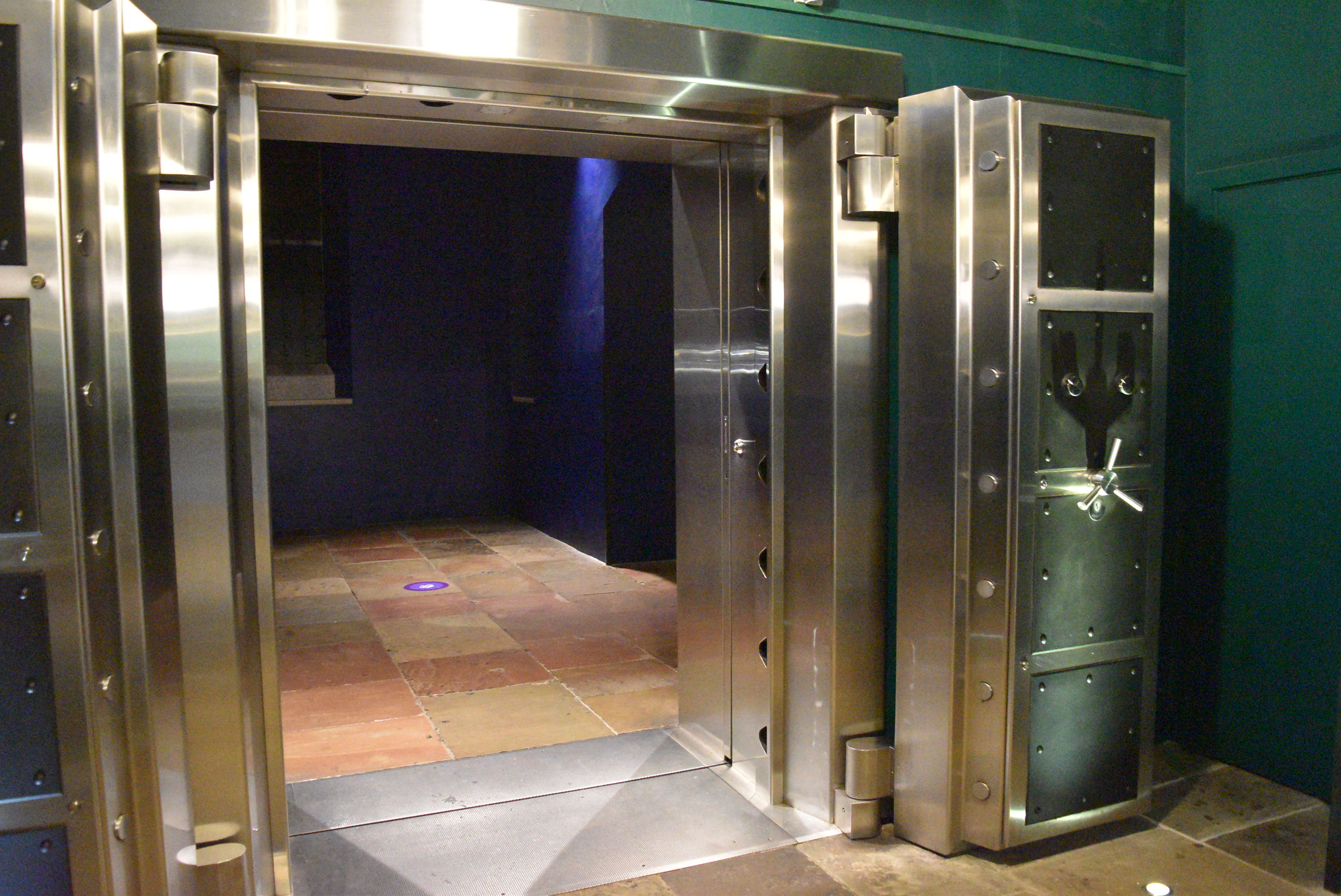
The vault doors

The Crown Jewels are protected by bombproof glass, and visitors to the tower are closely watched by more than 100 hidden CCTV cameras. The security of the Tower of London as a whole is provided by the 22-strong Tower Guard which has been at the Waterloo Block since 1845. They are on detachment from the British Army and "operate under orders agreed with the Ministry of Defence to ensure the security of the Crown Jewels".

The 38 Yeomen Warders, ex-military personnel employed by Historic Royal Palaces, also provide security, though their daytime role is more concerned with managing the large number of visitors. Unlike the soldiers of the Tower Guard, who rotate, the Yeomen Warders are permanent and live in the tower itself. The present body dates from 1485, and they wear similar uniforms to the Sovereign's bodyguards, the Yeomen of the Guard, of which they have been extraordinary members since 1550.

The jewels are removed on the authority of the Lord Chamberlain, head of the Royal Household, exercised by his deputy the Comptroller of the Lord Chamberlain's Office. He signs a voucher on receipt of the items from the Deputy Governor. Only the Crown Jeweller can handle the regalia. It is customary for armed police officers to be present at all times. In 2011, Colonel Richard Harrold was appointed as the Keeper of the Jewel House. By May 2023, the Keeper was Brigadier Andrew Jackson; he took part in the Royal Procession at the Coronation of Charles III and Camilla, carrying the King's ring. The Chief Exhibitor of the Jewel House is Keith Hanson, and the Deputy Chief Exhibitor is Lyn Jones.

== See also ==
- Jewel Tower, the King's wardrobe at the Palace of Westminster until the sixteenth century.
