= Préaux, Seine-Maritime =

Préaux
- Commune
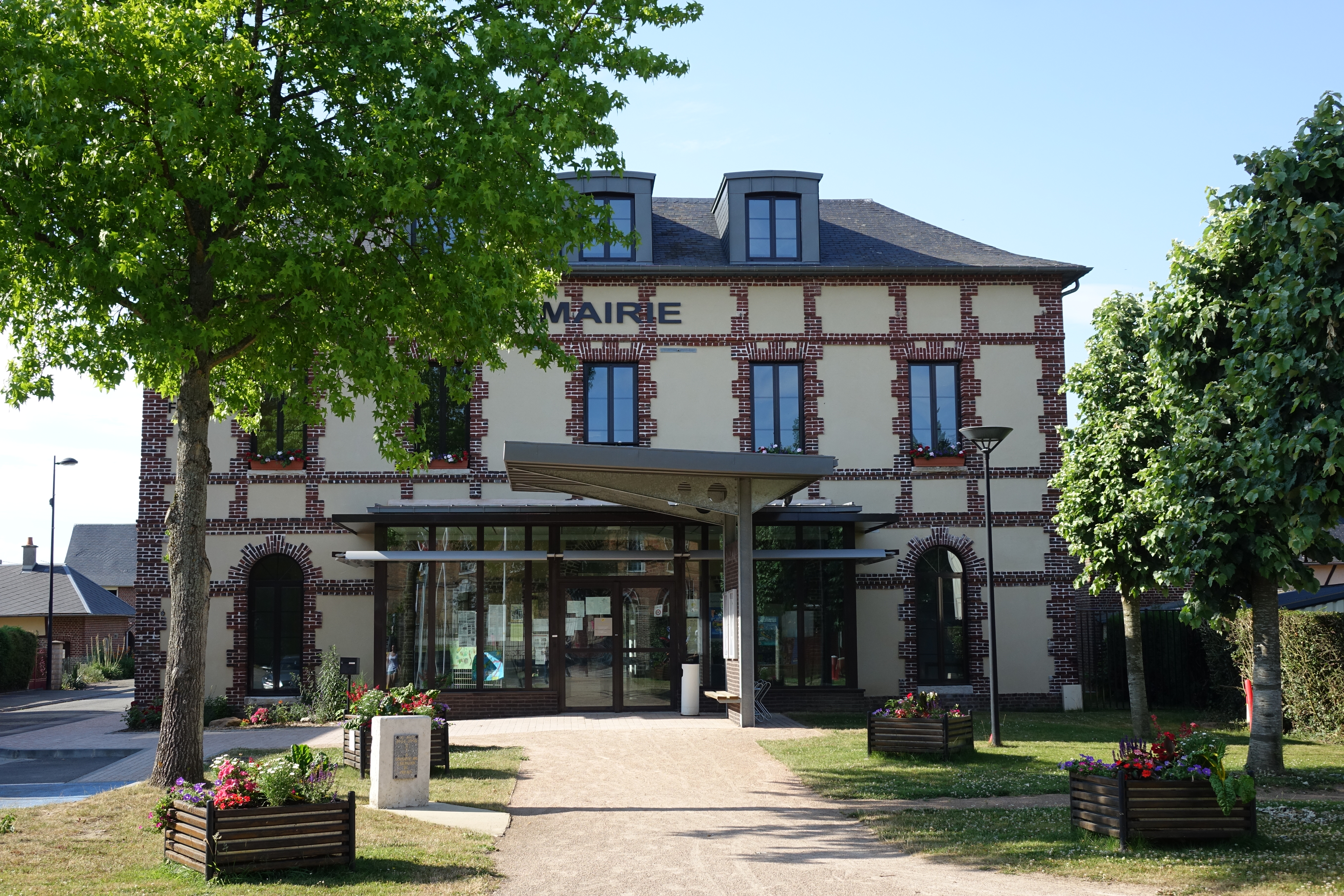
- The town hall in Préaux

- Coat of arms
- Location of Préaux
- Location within France Location within Normandy
- Coordinates: 49°29′31″N 1°12′52″E
- Country: France
- Region: Normandy
- Department: Seine-Maritime
- Arrondissement: Rouen
- Canton: Le Mesnil-Esnard
- Intercommunality: CC Inter-Caux-Vexin

Government
  - Mayor (2026–32): Anthony Aguado
- Area^{1}: 18.95 km^{2} (7.32 sq mi)
- Elevation: 170 m (560 ft)
- Highest elevation: 176 m (577 ft)
- Lowest elevation: 80 m (260 ft)
- Population (2023): 1,849
  - Density: 97.57/km^{2} (252.7/sq mi)
- Time zone: UTC+01:00 (CET)
  - Summer (DST): UTC+02:00 (CEST)
- INSEE/Postal code: 76509 /76160
- ^{1} French Land Register data, which excludes lakes, ponds, glaciers > 1 km^{2} (0.386 sq mi or 247 acres) and river estuaries.

Préaux (French pronunciation: [pʁeo]) is a commune in the Seine-Maritime department in the Normandy region in northern France.

== Geography ==
A farming village situated some 9 miles (14 km) northeast of Rouen at the junction of the D6015, D47 and the D104 roads. The A151 autoroute passes through the commune's territory.

== Heraldry ==
Arms of Préaux	The arms of Préaux are blazoned : Gules, 4 pales argent, overall a double-headed eagle Or, langued of the field, heads and feet azure.

== Population ==
Historical population
Year	Pop.	±% p.a.
1968	611	—
1975	822	+4.33%
1982	1,105	+4.32%
1990	1,450	+3.45%
1999	1,641	+1.38%
2007	1,649	+0.06%
2012	1,699	+0.60%
2017	1,812	+1.30%
2023	1,849	+0.34%
Source: INSEE

== Places of interest ==
- The church of Notre-Dame, dating from the eighteenth century.
- Ruins of a thirteenth-century castle.

== See also ==
- Communes of the Seine-Maritime department
