= Geoffrey de Mandeville, 2nd Earl of Essex =

English earl (died 1166)

Geoffrey de Mandeville, 2nd Earl of Essex (died 1166) was an English nobleman, the second son of Geoffrey de Mandeville, 1st Earl of Essex and Rohese de Vere, Countess of Essex.

== Life ==
During or soon after his father's rebellion against King Stephen in 1143–1144, young Geoffrey was sent or made his way to Devizes, a base of the Empress Matilda. After the earl's death, the empress recognized the right of Geoffrey III to the earldom of Essex and the vast Mandeville holdings. His whereabouts during the remaining years of King Stephen's reign are unknown. In January 1156 King Henry II confirmed Geoffrey's title as earl of Essex and the Mandeville lands, but not those lands or offices granted to his father during the civil war.

The earl served as an itinerant royal justice with Richard de Lucy in 1165–1166, visiting many of the counties of England. In 1166 he was engaged in preparations for a royal campaign in Wales when he fell ill and died in September or October. He was buried at Walden Priory in Essex, a monastery founded by his father. Geoffrey was succeeded by his brother, William de Mandeville, 3rd Earl of Essex.

== Family ==
Earl Geoffrey married Eustachia, a relative of King Henry. When she complained that her husband would not live with her, the king helped her obtain an annulment. The couple were apparently childless.

== Sources ==
- Hollister, C. Warren (1986). Monarchy, magnates, and institutions in the Anglo-Norman world. London: Hambledon Press. ISBN 0-907628-50-8.
- Hollister, C. Warren (2004). "Mandeville, Geoffrey de, first earl of Essex (d. 1144)". Oxford Dictionary of National Biography. Oxford: Oxford University Press. doi:10.1093/ref:odnb/17927.

Peerage of England
Preceded by Geoffrey de Mandeville	Earl of Essex; 1144–1166	Succeeded by William de Mandeville
