= Geoffrey de Mandeville (11th century) =

Anglo-Norman baron

Geoffrey de Mandeville (died c. 1100), also known as de Magnaville (from the Latin de Magna Villa "of the great town"), was a Constable of the Tower of London. Mandeville was a Norman, from one of several places that were known as Magna Villa in the Duchy of Normandy. These included the modern communes of Manneville-la-Goupil and Mannevillette. Some records indicate that Geoffrey was from Thil-Manneville, in Seine-Maritime, Haute-Normandy (upper Normandy).

== Life ==
An important Domesday tenant-in-chief, Geoffrey was one of the ten richest magnates of the reign of William the Conqueror. William granted him large estates, primarily in Essex, but in ten other shires as well. He served as the first sheriff of London and Middlesex, and perhaps also in Essex, and in Hertfordshire. He was the progenitor of the de Mandeville Earls of Essex. About 1085 he and Lescelina, his second wife, founded Hurley Priory by the River Thames in Berkshire, as a cell of Westminster Abbey.

== Family ==
Geoffrey married firstly, Athelaise (Adeliza) (d. bef. 1085), with whom he had:

- William de Mandeville (d. bef. 1130), married Margaret dau. of Eudo, dapifer, who m. 2ndly Otuer fitz Count.
- Beatrice de Mandeville, m. Geoffrey FitzEustace, natural son of Eustace II, Count of Boulogne. Geoffrey was Lord of Carshalton, Surrey
- Walter, who was also one of his tenants in 1086.

Geoffrey married secondly Lescelina, with whom he had no children.

Peerage of England
Preceded by Unknown	Constable of the Tower of London; 1086–1100	Succeeded by William de Mandeville
