= Chapel Royal =

Group ministering to the spiritual needs of the British monarch

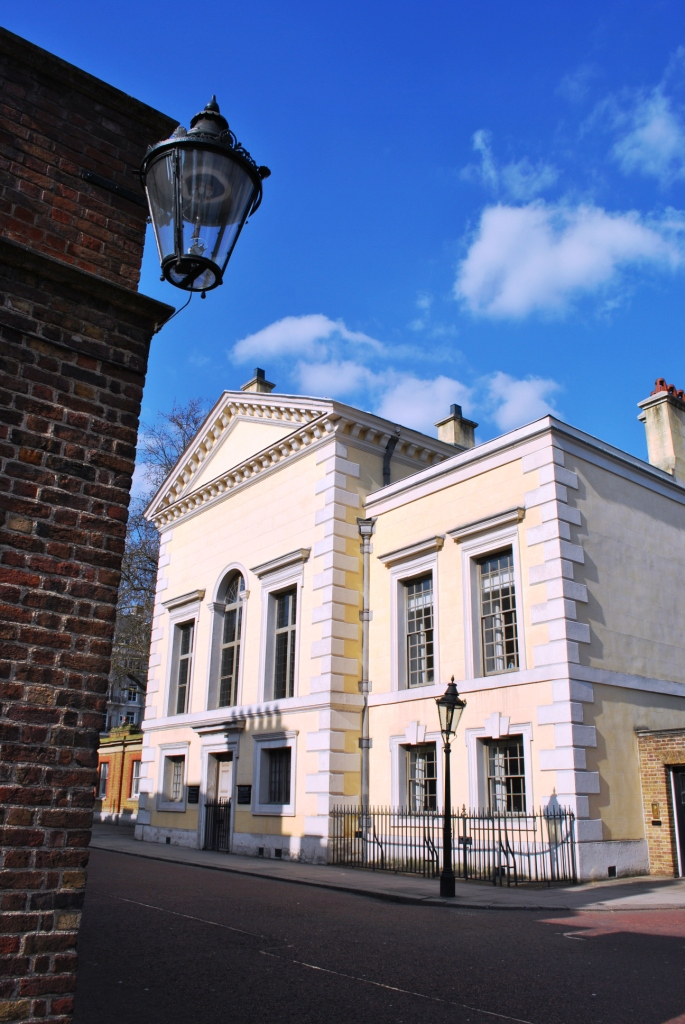
The Queen's Chapel at St James's Palace in London, one of six chapels royal in the UK

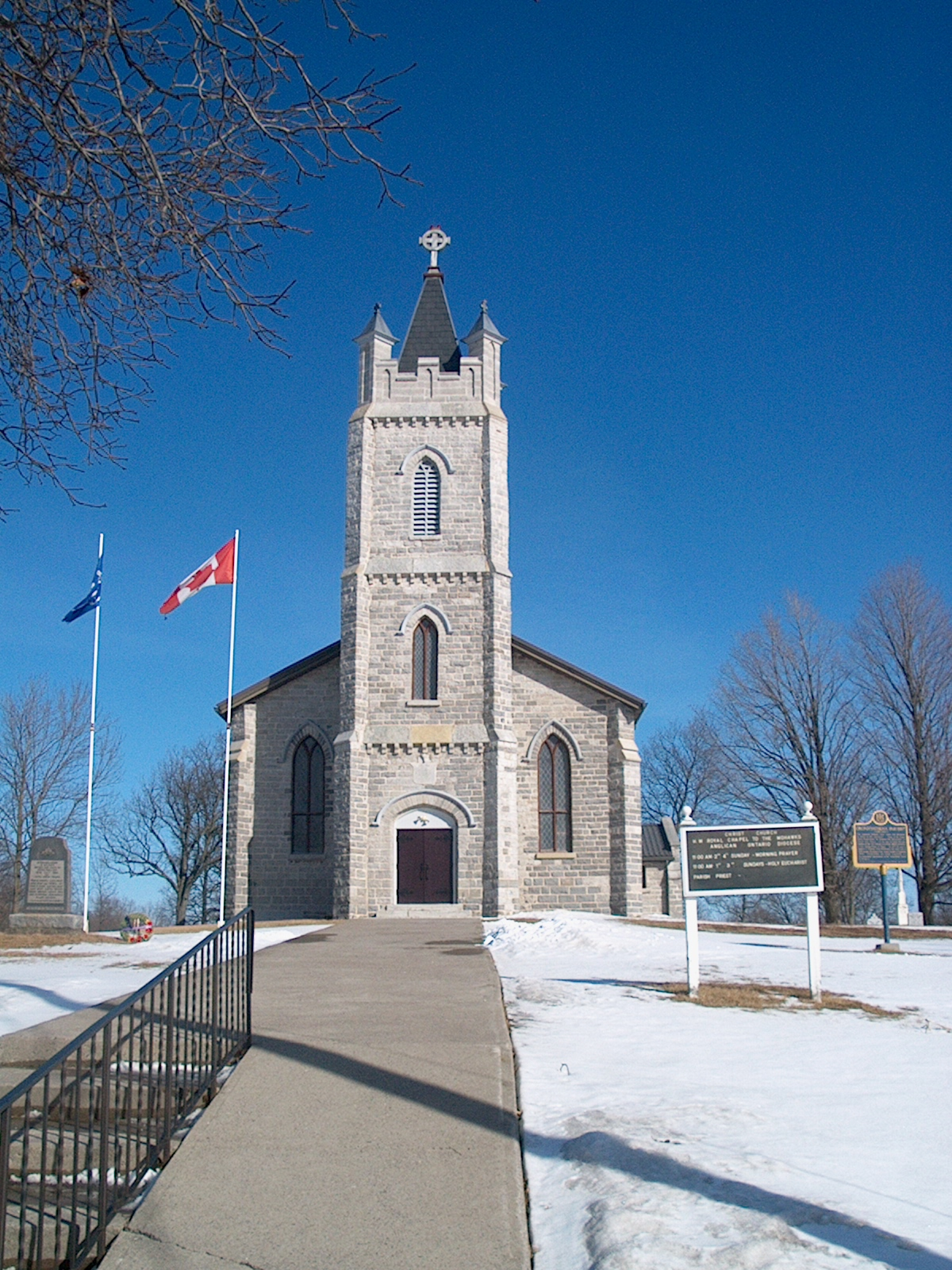
The Christ Church Royal Chapel near Deseronto, Canada, one of Canada's three chapels royal

Chapel Royal is a designation given to certain chapels and churches with links to the monarchy in England and Canada. According to the Royal Family's website, 'in origin and still in principle, the Chapel Royal is not a building but an establishment: a body of priests and singers to serve the spiritual needs of the Sovereign'. In the Royal Household of the United Kingdom, the Chapels Royal is the name of the department responsible for the chapel establishment, staffed by Anglican clergy, church musicians and the officers of the Vestry (who function as vergers). The Chapels Royal and the College of Chaplains together form the monarch's Ecclesiastical Household.

Historically, the chapel royal was an establishment of chaplains, clerks, children and servants that travelled with the monarch as part of his royal court. The chapel royal ministered to the Household and sang services each day, wherever the monarch was residing. As the court became more settled, the term 'chapel royal' came to be attached to places of worship in the principal royal palaces: those within the Tower of London, the Palace of Westminster and Eltham Palace were the earliest examples. The chapels royal played a significant role in the musical life of the nation: composers such as Tallis, Byrd, Bull, Gibbons, and Purcell all served as Gentlemen of the Chapel.

At the present time, the Chapels Royal in England are: the Chapel Royal, St James's Palace and the Queen's Chapel, St James's Palace; the Chapel Royal, Hampton Court Palace; the Chapel Royal of St Peter ad Vincula and the Chapel Royal of St John the Evangelist (both in the Tower of London); and The King's Chapel of the Savoy. Each chapel (or pair of chapels) is staffed by a chaplain and has a choir singing regular services through the year. Historically, there were Chapels Royal in Scotland and Ireland as well (see below).

In Canada, the three chapels royal are affiliated with some of the country's First Nations; the earliest of the three is the Mohawk Chapel, the oldest surviving church in Ontario (which was designated as a royal chapel by King Edward VII in 1904). Outside Canada and the United Kingdom, there is also royal chapel on Bermuda: St. Peter's Church - Their Majesties Chappell, located in St. George's Parish (its royal title was originally bestowed under William and Mary in 1697 and confirmed by Elizabeth II in 2012); this reputedly is the oldest continually-used Anglican church in the Western Hemisphere.

Chapel Royal equivalents, often similarly named, are (or were) to be found in other monarchies, particularly in countries where there is or was an established, national or state church.

== Status ==
In the Church of England, extant chapels royal are classed as royal peculiars (being under the ecclesiastical jurisdiction of the monarch, rather than that of a diocesan bishop). As a collective body, the Chapels Royal are deemed to be one of the three principal royal peculiars of the realm (the other two being Westminster Abbey and St George's Chapel, Windsor Castle).

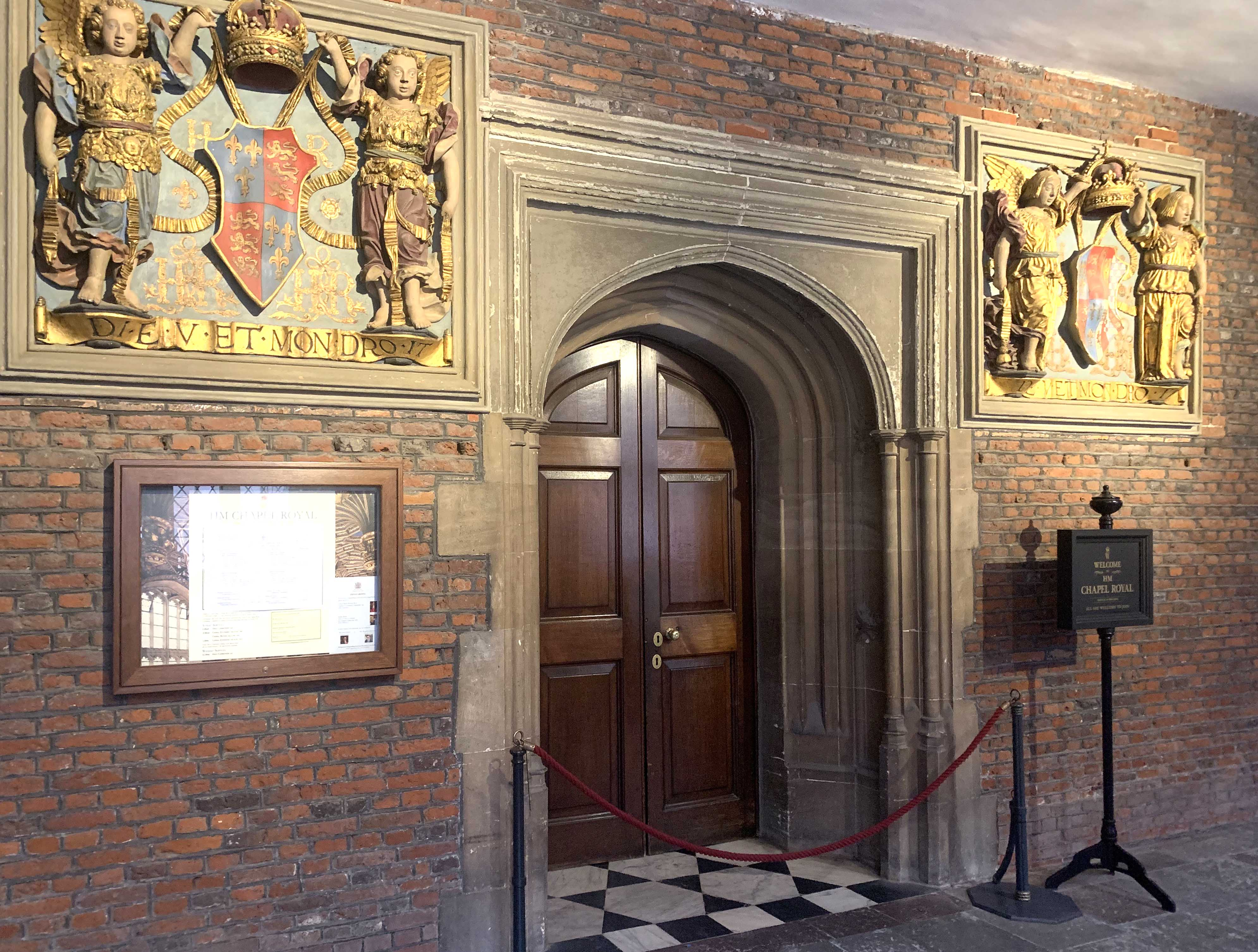
The royal arms (of Henry VIII and Jane Seymour) flanking the door to His Majesty's Chapel Royal, Hampton Court Palace.

There is a long-standing ambiguity as to whether the terms 'Chapel Royal' and 'Chapels Royal' in the Royal Household refer primarily to a building/buildings or an organisation. Chapel Royal historian David Baldwin connects this with a 'power struggle' in the early eighteenth century between the Lord Chamberlain and the Earl Marshal over the control and direction of royal ceremonial occasions. In 1702, Queen Anne went to St Paul's Cathedral for a service of thanksgiving following her accession; an Order in Council was issued declaring St Paul's to be a Chapel Royal for the day (making the cathedral a notional extension of the royal palace), with the result that the Lord Chamberlain, rather than the Earl Marshal, managed the ceremonial. The same approach was used following the accession of George I in 1714, with the same result. The idea of 'chapel royal' signifying a place, rather than a company of people, then gained traction as the eighteenth century progressed: for example, Edmund Gibson was appointed 'Dean of His [Majesty's] Chapel Royal' in 1721, but in 1762 Richard Osbaldeston's appointment to the office was gazetted as 'Dean of His Majesty's Chapels Royal', (and the latter form of words has remained in use to the present day). The change coincided with the chapel having settled into certain fixed locations, rather than being an itinerant body; nevertheless, debate over the correct use of the term continued in subsequent centuries: for example, when the future of the Chapel Royal was being discussed in the 1940s (the Chapel Royal, St James's Palace having been damaged in the Blitz), the sub-dean W. H. Elliott asserted that 'the Chapel Royal is not a building at all, but a body of singers and musicians, who accompanied the king wherever he went'.

== Personnel ==
The office of Dean of His Majesty's Chapels Royal, in existence since 1349, is a royal household appointment that nowadays is usually held by the Bishop of London. Under the monarch, the dean oversees the chapel royal establishment with the assistance of the Sub-Dean of the Chapels Royal (who is the only full-time clerical member of the household).

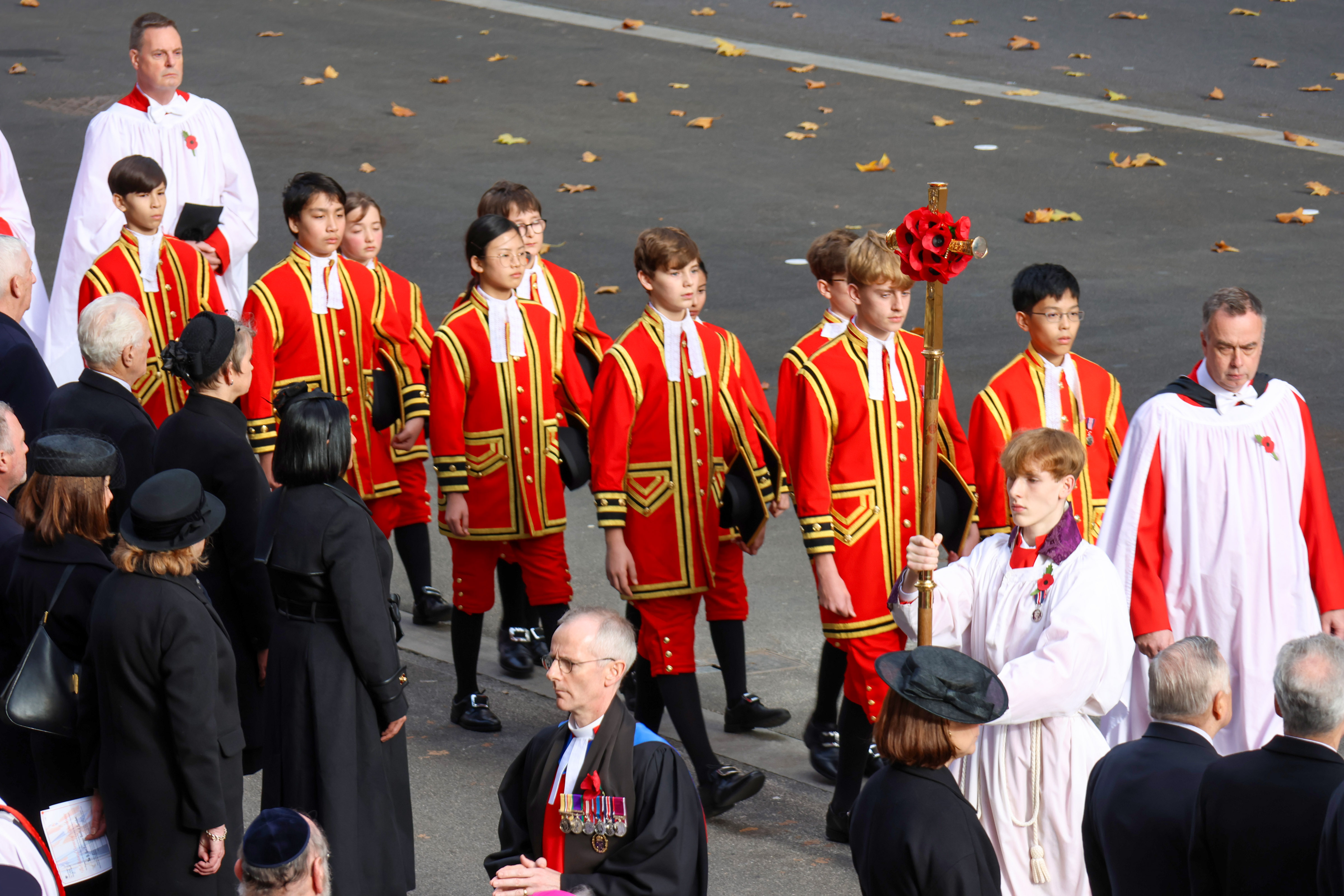
Children of the Chapel Royal (in scarlet) at the National Service of Remembrance at The Cenotaph in London, 2025.

The Chapel Royal Choir consists of six Gentlemen-in-Ordinary (the Gentlemen of the Chapel Royal) and ten choristers (the Children of the Chapel Royal), together with the Organist and Choirmaster and the Sub-Organist. They are based at St James's Palace (where the Sub-Dean functions as chaplain). The choir of the chapel royal claims to be one of the oldest continuous musical organisations in the world.

Today the Gentlemen of the chapel are lay clerks, but historically a proportion of them were clerks in holy orders, who took turns in singing the daily office. Over time these clerks evolved into the separate office of Priest in Ordinary; today there are two such priests (and a number of deputies), who attend in turn to assist the Sub-Dean in officiating at services and in pastoral and other duties.

The office of Serjeant of the Vestry is first recorded in 1254. By 1449 the vestry staff are listed as one serjeant, one yeoman and two grooms; they had charge of the 'plate, books, vestments and other ornaments pertaining to the chapel'. The office of Yeoman of the Vestry was united with that of Serjeant in 1868, but the appointment of Groom of the Vestry is still in place. The groom and serjeant both function as vergers for the Chapel Royal; the Keeper of the Closet fulfils a similar role.

Up until 1912, Chaplains to the Sovereign were considered to be part of the Chapel Royal establishment. In that year they were formed into a separate body, the College of Chaplains, with the Clerk of the Closet (rather than the Dean of the Chapels Royal) designated as their head. Chaplains to the King continue to preach annually at the Chapel Royal, St James's Palace. It was long the case (as stated in 1894) that: 'no one is permitted to preach in the Chapel Royal who is not either a chaplain in ordinary or an honorary chaplain to the Queen'—except during Lent (when Deans and Bishops were invited to preach) and on Easter Day and Whit Sunday (when, by custom, the Lord High Almoner or the Sub-Almoner preached).

Canon of the Chapels Royal is a recently revived title. In 2012, Roger Hall, the Chaplain of the Tower of London, was made canon of the Chapels Royal at the Tower of London, the first such appointment since the 16th century; others have since been appointed.

=== Duties and activities ===
The Gentlemen and Children of the Chapel Royal sings choral services at St James's Palace on Sundays and major feast days (except in August and September), and elsewhere when called upon to do so by the monarch. The other Chapels Royal in London have their own choirs and maintain a similar pattern of services.

On Remembrance Sunday the Chapel Royal leads the Service of Remembrance at the Cenotaph in Whitehall; the dean usually officiates, assisted by the Sub-Dean, and the choir sings. On Maundy Thursday each year, the Gentlemen and Children of the Chapel attend the monarch at the Royal Maundy service, joining with the choir of the host abbey or cathedral for the occasion. The choir also customarily takes part in state and royal events such as coronations, royal weddings, state and ceremonial royal funerals, jubilee services of thanksgiving, etc. (on these occasions they likewise usually combine with the choir of the abbey or cathedral where the service is taking place). A significant number of royal weddings and christenings have taken place in the Chapels Royal over the centuries. Baptisms, weddings and funerals of members of the Household may also take place there, with the monarch's permission.

=== HM Chapel Royal in Scotland ===
The Royal Household in Scotland makes its own ecclesiastical provision, which is separate from that of the Anglican Chapels Royal. Dean of His Majesty's Chapel Royal in Scotland is a distinct office, held by a minister of the Church of Scotland, who oversees ecclesiastical arrangements for the Household in Scotland. Chaplains to the King in Scotland are also overseen by the dean. The appointment of dean is often joined with that of Dean of the Thistle.

== History ==
=== England ===
==== Middle Ages ====
In its early history, the English Chapel Royal travelled, like the rest of the court, with the monarch and performed its functions wherever he or she was residing at the time. The earliest written record of the Chapel dates from c. 1135, in the reign of Henry I. Specified in this document of household regulations are two gentlemen and four servants; although, there may have been other people within the Chapel at that time. An ordinance from the reign of Henry VI sets out the full membership of the Chapel as of 1455: one dean, 20 chaplains and clerks, seven children, one chaplain confessor for the household, and one yeoman. However, in the same year, the clerks petitioned the King asking that their number be increased to 24 singing men, due to "the grete labour that thei have daily in your chapell". The master of the children of the Chapel Royal had, until at least 1684, the power to impress promising boy trebles from provincial choirs for service in the Chapel.

From the reign of Edward IV in the late 1400s, further details survive: There were 26 chaplains and clerks, who were to be "cleare voysid" in their singing and "suffisaunt in Organes playing". The children were supervised by a master of song, chosen by the dean from among the gentlemen of the Chapel Royal; they were allocated supplies of meat and ale and their own servant. Additionally, there were two yeoman of the Chapel, who acted as epistlers, reading from the Bible during services; these were appointed from children of the Chapel whose voices had recently broken. In 1483 the various elements of the chapel were incorporated as the Royal Free Chapel of the Household: letters patent, issued in February that year, envisaged the chapel being governed by the Dean and three new canons: a sub-dean, treasurer and precentor; but Edward IV died two months later and the canonries were never endowed (though the office of sub-dean was retained).

==== Tudor period ====
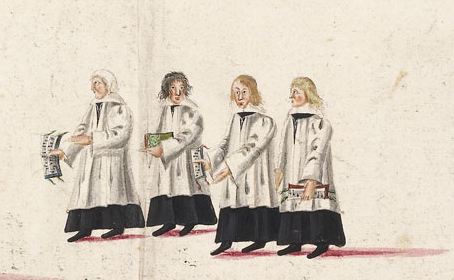
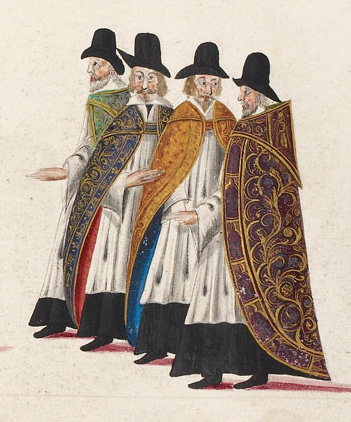
Children (left) and gentlemen (right) of the Chapel in the funeral procession of Queen Elizabeth I

The Chapel remained stable throughout the reign of Henry VIII and the dissolution of the monasteries. The number of singers did vary during this period, however, without apparent reason, from between 20 and 30 gentlemen and eight to 10 children. The Chapel travelled with the King to the Field of the Cloth of Gold and during the second invasion of France.

The Chapel increasingly took on another, unofficial function that grew in importance into the 17th century – performing in dramas. The affiliated theatre company, known as the Children of the Chapel, produced plays by playwrights including John Lyly, Ben Jonson, and George Chapman, and performed them at court and then commercially until the 1620s. Both the gentlemen and the children would act in pageants and plays for the royal family, held in court on feast days such as Christmas. For example, at Christmas 1514, the play The Triumph of Love and Beauty was written and presented by William Cornysh, then-Master of the Children, and was performed to the King by members of the Chapel, including the children.

In music, the Chapel achieved its greatest eminence during the reign of Elizabeth I, when William Byrd and Thomas Tallis were joint organists.

==== 17th & 18th century ====
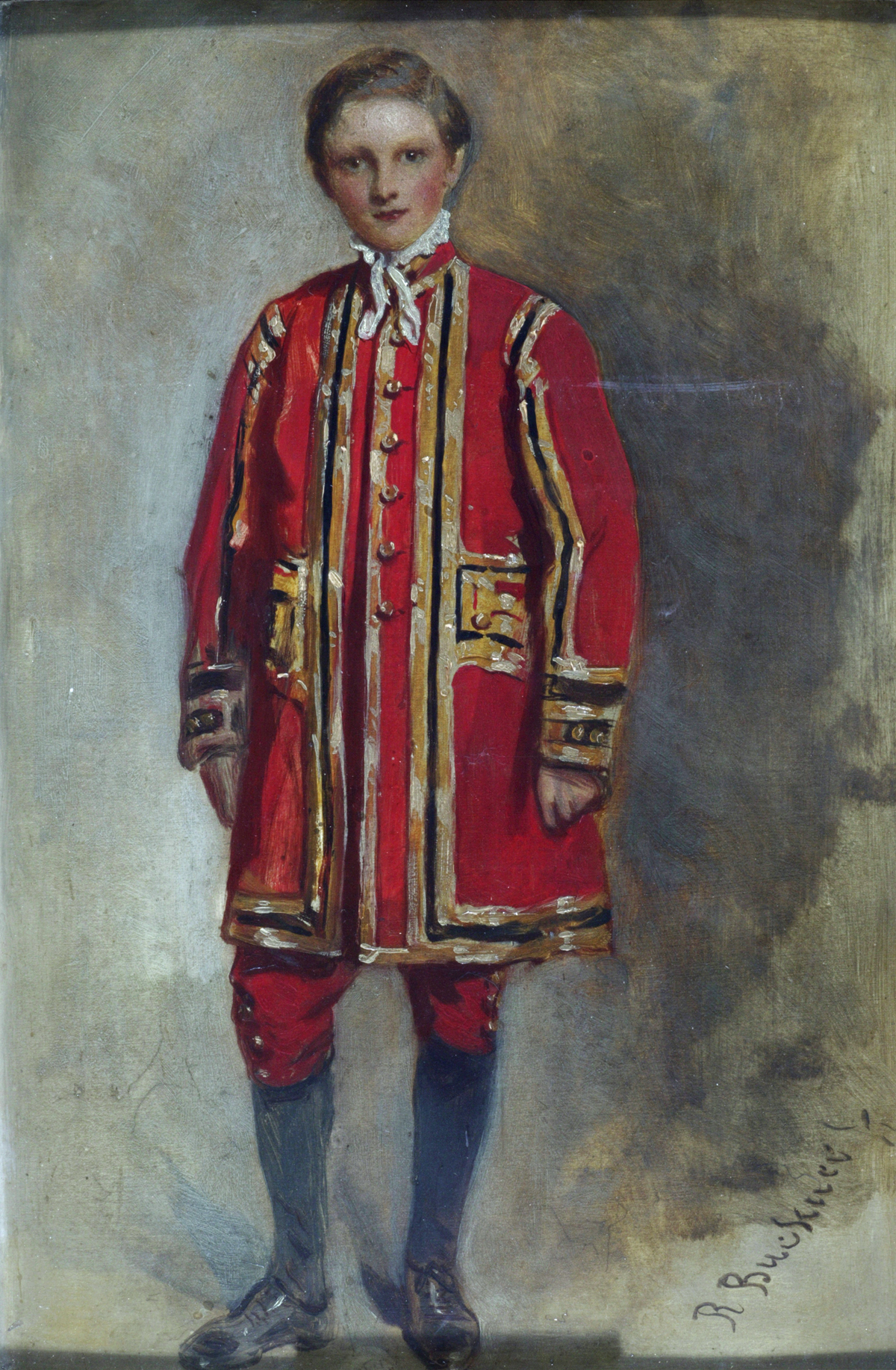
Portrait of a Boy Chorister of the Chapel Royal by Richard Buckner (c. 1873); the distinctive scarlet livery worn by the children of the chapel was introduced in the 1660s.

In the 17th century, the Chapel Royal had its own building in Whitehall, which burned in 1698; since 1702, it has been based at St James's Palace. The English Chapel Royal became increasingly associated with Westminster Abbey, so that, by 1625, over half of the gentlemen of the English Chapel Royal were also members of the Westminster Abbey choir. Under Charles II, the choir was often augmented by violinists from the royal consort; at various times, the Chapel has also employed composers, lutenists, and viol players.

In the 18th century, the choristers sang the soprano parts in performances of Handel's oratorios and other works. The Sunday service times in 1714 were 'Morning Prayers at eight and eleven, and Evening Prayers at five o'clock'; the 8 am service was omitted if the Queen and her Household were not in residence. In 1792 it was still required that 'Divine Service be performed in the Chapel, morning and evening daily throughout the year, and not to be omitted on any pretence whatsoever'; a century later it was noted that 'the daily services have for many years been discontinued, and the only week day services now held in the Chapel Royal besides those on Sundays are on Saints' Days and on Wednesdays and Fridays in Lent'.

==== 19th & 20th century ====
The marriage of Queen Victoria and Prince Albert took place in the Chapel Royal, St James's Palace, in 1840; her eldest daughter Victoria, Princess Royal, was likewise married there in 1858. Later, the marriage of the queen's grandson Prince George (the future King George V) to Mary of Teck took place in the same chapel, in 1893.

In 1860 a Chapel Royal Commission recommended the merging and abolishing of several offices and appointments; this took place over ensuing years. For example there had previously been sixteen Gentlemen of the Chapel, formed into two teams of eight who served alternately for a month at a time; the commissioners proposed instead that a single team of eight Gentlemen should fulfil singing duties on Sunday mornings and evenings (and on holy days) through the year. The recommended reduction was achieved over the space of fifteen years, with certain 'senior Gentlemen' being retained as deputies, on half pay (and with the 'honorary rank of Gentleman of the Chapel Royal').

In 1911 the Chaplains in Ordinary and Honorary Chaplains were removed from the establishment of the Chapels Royal and instead placed under the Clerk of the Closet, forming what was thenceforth termed the College of Chaplains. (Nonetheless, the chaplains were still invited to preach once a year at the Chapel Royal at St James's). In 1920, in the wake of the First World War, Lord Stamfordham (the king's Private Secretary) raised questions as to 'whether the Chapel Royal justifies its existence, both from the point of view that the King never goes there, and from that of the Church'. Nevertheless, the Chapel(s) Royal continued thereafter to function and do so to the present day.

=== Ireland ===
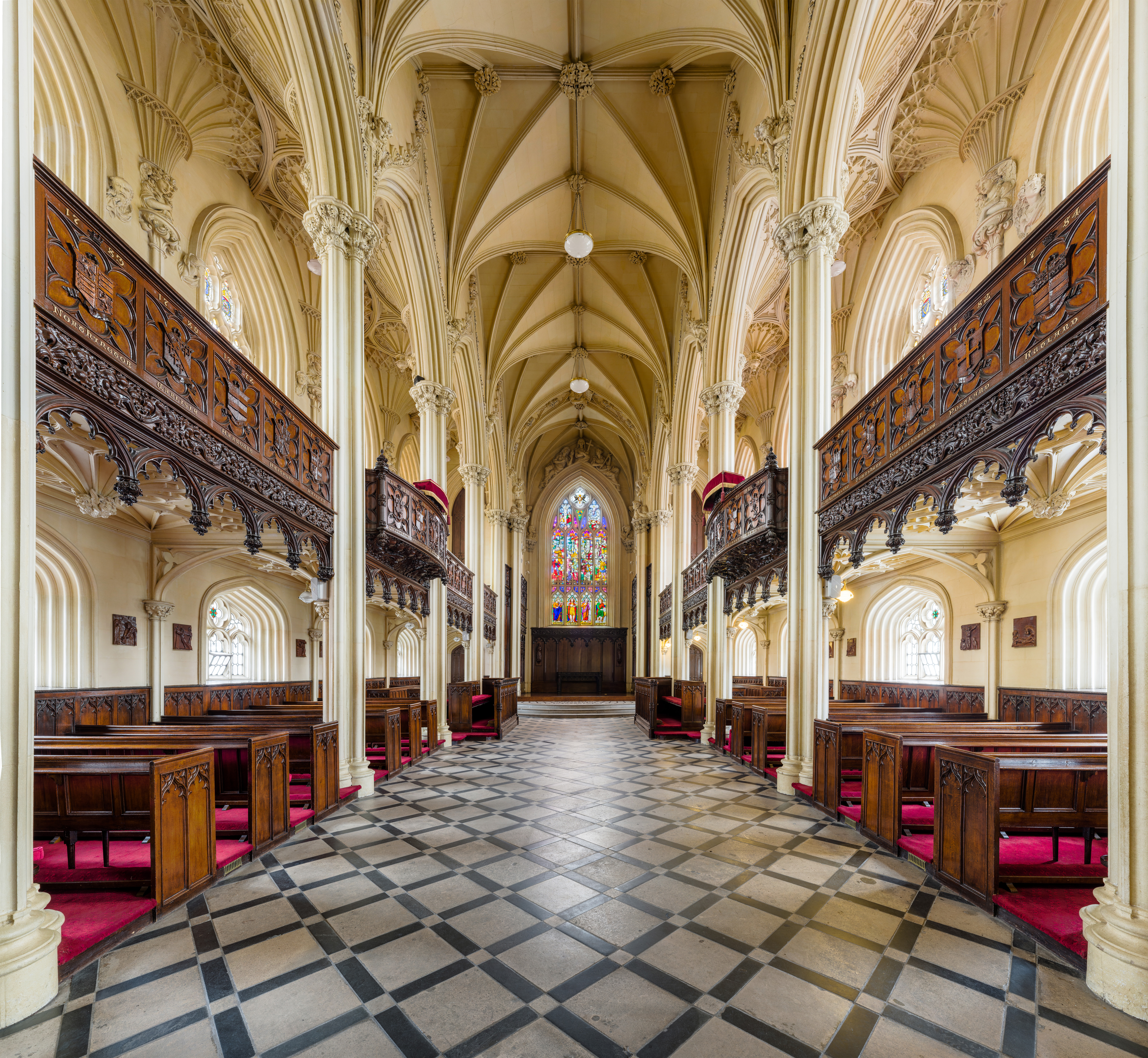
The Chapel Royal Interior, Dublin Castle.

Prior to the establishment of the Irish Free State in 1922, the Chapel Royal, Dublin operated within Dublin Castle, which served as the official seat for the lord lieutenant of Ireland.

=== Scotland ===
In medieval Scotland, as in England, the chapel was a sizeable department of the Royal Household; it travelled with the king and his court from place to place and from palace to palace. Places of worship were provided within castles and palaces for the benefit of the monarch and the household alike, which were also termed Chapels Royal. In the fifteenth century there were chapels at Dumbarton Castle, Edinburgh Castle, Falkland Castle, Stirling Castle and Linlithgow Palace (among others). There is no evidence of a chapel within Dunfermline Palace, where the adjoining Abbey (itself a royal foundation) is assumed to have fulfilled the requirement. The Collegiate Church of St Mary on the Rock at St Andrews also functioned as a Chapel Royal.

==== 16th-century developments ====
The Chapel Royal, Falkland Palace

In the early 1500s, King James IV built new or refurbished chapels in Edinburgh and Stirling Castles, and in Falkland and Linlithgow Palaces, as well as in his new Palace of Holyroodhouse. There is also a surviving 16th-century chapel at Rothesay Castle. Some of these replaced an older chapel, but in other cases the older chapel continued to operate alongside the new. Apart from the larger chapel buildings at Stirling and Edinburgh (which were at ground level), the chapels royal were usually located on the upper floor of the north or south range of the palace quadrangle (so as to be correctly orientated); they generally occupied all or most of the length of that part of the building. On occasion, however, something on a larger scale was required: thus at Holyrood, the adjacent Abbey was used for more elaborate royal ceremonies and services (such as the marriage of James IV and Margaret Tudor, and the coronation of Mary of Guise).

===== The establishment at Stirling =====
The Chapel Royal in Stirling Castle (as rebuilt for the christening of Prince Henry in 1594).

James IV's Chapel Royal at Stirling was a collegiate-type foundation, with a dean, a subdean, a sacrist, sixteen canons, sixteen prebends 'skilled in song' and six 'boy clerics' (or 'songsters'). In addition to the establishment at Stirling, there were twenty-seven chaplains attached to the royal court, who were overseen by the master almoner.

Initially, James Allardyce, the provost of St Mary on the Rock, St Andrews, was appointed dean at Stirling Castle (the two ecclesial offices being united) and certain canonries and prebends were used to endow the new foundation. Authority for the new collegiate chapel was set out in a Papal mandate, dated 2 May 1501 (which exempted the dean and other officers of the chapel from the jurisdiction of the Archbishop of St Andrews). When Allardyce died, however, soon after taking up the new appointment, the link with St Mary on the Rock was dissolved. From 1504 onwards, the deanery of the Chapel Royal was held by successive Bishops of Galloway with the title Bishop of the Chapel Royal and authority over all the royal palaces within Scotland. (Later, in 1621, the deanery was annexed to the bishopric of Dunblane—the offices were held conjointly: Bishop of Dunblane and Dean of the Chapel Royal; this arrangement pertained until the abolition of episcopacy in 1689.)

The Chapel Royal establishment was still in place at Stirling in 1540. During the reign of Queen Mary, the court (and with it the Chapel Royal) was primarily based at Holyrood. In the early 1570s, with the very young King James VI lodged at Stirling, the Chapel Royal was likewise quartered there once again. Subsequently, when the royal court came to be permanently settled at Holyrood, the dean ministered at the chapel there and the chapel at Stirling Castle fell into decay.

===== The move to Holyrood =====
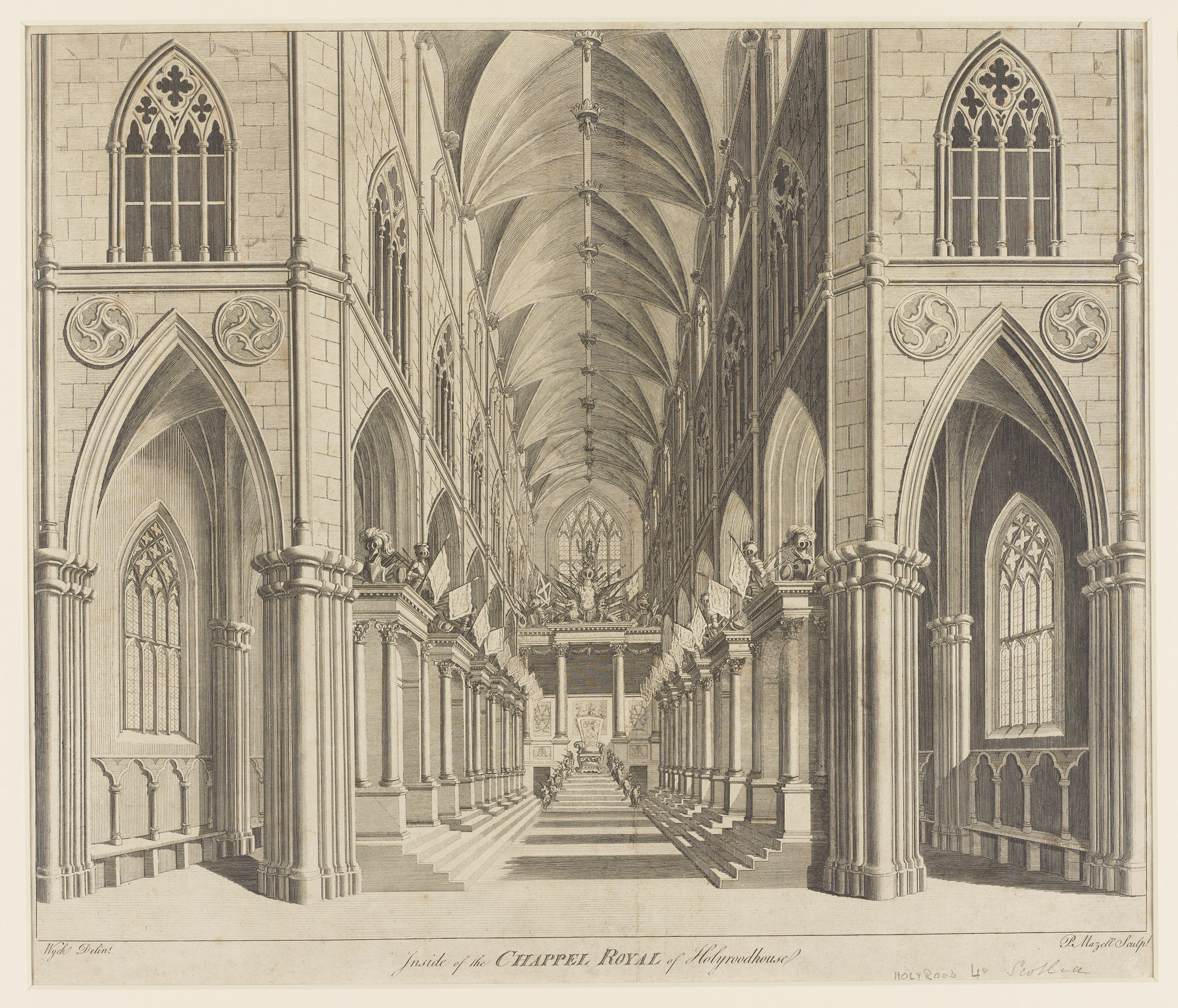
Inside of the Chappel Royal [i.e. Abbey] of Holyroodhouse (an 18th-century engraving by Peter Mazell, based on a 17th-century original by Jan Wyck)

In the 1530s, James V replaced his father's chapel at Holyrood with a new Chapel Royal (in the south, rather than the north, range of the building). When Charles II rebuilt the palace in the 1670s, the Chapel Royal was turned into a council chamber; in its place, the Privy Council and the Commissioners of the Exchequer declared (on 23 September 1672) that the Abbey Church was to be 'His Majesteis Chapell Royeall in all tymes comeing'. In 1685 James VII came to the throne and began, the following year, to restore the Abbey as a Roman Catholic place of worship (to serve as a chapel royal and also as chapel to his newly-established Order of the Thistle). Following the Glorious Revolution in 1688, however, a mob in Edinburgh broke into the abbey, destroyed the furnishings and desecrated the royal tombs. From then on, the building fell into decay and became a roofless ruin. The restoration of the abbey has been proposed several times since the 18th century – in 1835, by the architect James Gillespie Graham as a meeting place for the General Assembly of the Church of Scotland, and in 1906, as a chapel for the Knights of the Thistle – but both proposals were rejected.

==== Aftermath ====
There are no currently-operational Chapels Royal in Scotland, but there are surviving buildings at Falkland, Linlithgow, Rothesay and Stirling, as well as the ruined Abbey at Holyrood and St Margaret's Chapel in Edinburgh Castle. The larger St Mary's Chapel in Edinburgh Castle no longer exists; the Scottish National War Memorial stands in its place.

== Locations ==
=== Bermuda ===
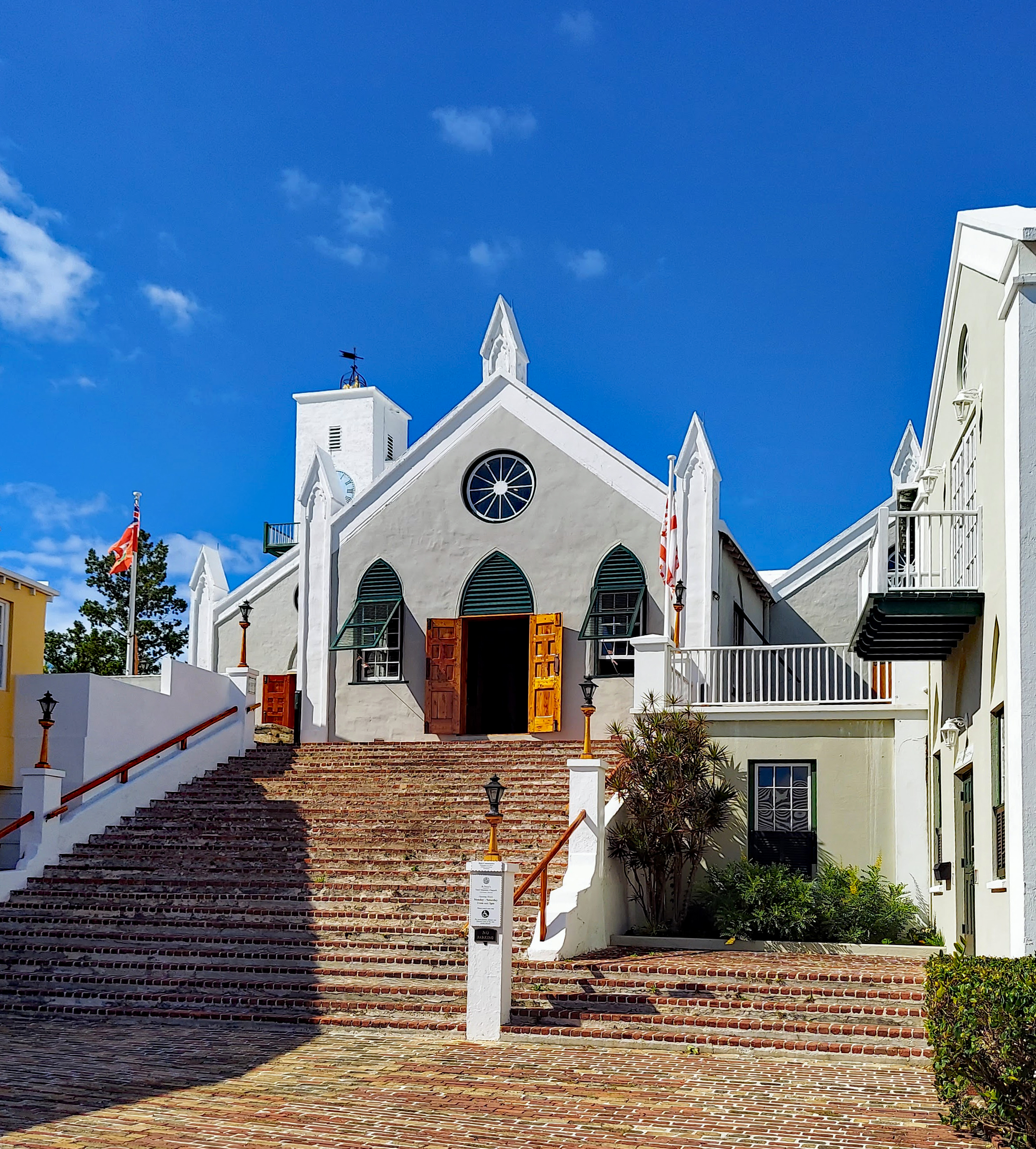
Their Majesties Chappell (St Peter's) in Bermuda

St. Peter's Church – Their Majesties Chappell – is located in St. George's Parish, Bermuda. It first received its royal designation during the joint reign of King William and Queen Mary (in a royal warrant dated 18 March 1697); this was reconfirmed by Her Majesty Queen Elizabeth II on 18 March 2012. Their Majesties Chappell claims to be the oldest surviving Anglican church in continuous use outside the British Isles.

=== Canada ===
Chapels royal in Canada are religious establishments which have been granted a rare honorific distinction by the monarch in recognition of their unique role or place. Three sanctuaries in Canada, all located in the province of Ontario, have been designated as chapels royal. All have associations with First Nations communities and the connection between them and the Canadian Crown.

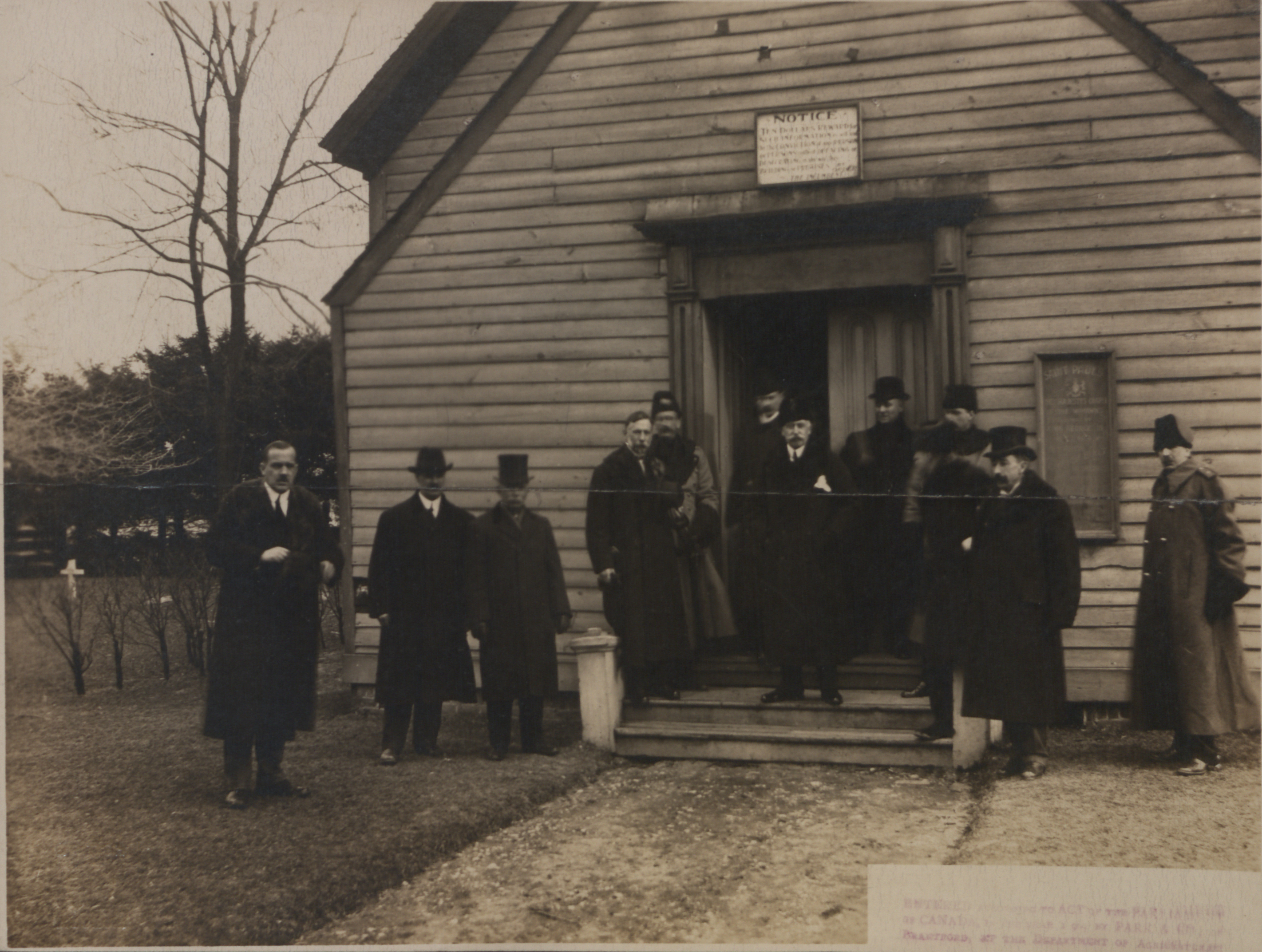
Prince Arthur at Mohawk Chapel in 1913. The sanctuary was designated as a Chapel Royal in 1904.

The first two chapels royal are situated within Mohawk communities that were established in Canada after the American Revolutionary War. The first, Mohawk Chapel in Brantford, was designated as a chapel royal in 1904 by King Edward VII Mohawk Chapel was designated in recognition of the historic alliance between the Mohawk people and the Crown, referred to as the Covenant Chain. A century later, in 2004, Christ Church, near Deseronto, was designated a chapel royal by Queen Elizabeth II. Christ Church, long the parish church of the Tyendinaga Mohawk Territory, was designated as a chapel royal in recognition of the community's military service.

Several gifts from the Crown were bestowed on these chapels royal, including silver communion services and a Bible from Queen Anne, a triptych from King George III, a Bible from Queen Victoria, and a bicentennial chalice from Queen Elizabeth II. In 2010, Elizabeth II presented to the Mohawk Chapel a set of silver hand bells engraved with the words Silver Chain of Friendship, 1710–2010, to commemorate the tricentennial of the first meeting between Mohawk representatives and the Crown.

In April 2016, the Queen approved in principle that St Catherine's Chapel in Toronto be designated a chapel royal. The chapel itself is situated within Massey College, a college of the University of Toronto, conceived by Vincent Massey, a former governor general of Canada. It became Canada's third chapel royal on 21 June, National Indigenous Peoples Day, 2017. St Catherine's Chapel is the first interfaith and interdenominational chapel royal and the only one with its own title in an Indigenous language. It was designated as a chapel royal in recognition of the sesquicentennial of Canada, the relationship between Massey College and the Mississaugas of the Credit First Nation, and as a gesture of reconciliation. The chapel acknowledge the history of the Royal Proclamation of 1763 and its ratification by the Treaty of Niagara in 1764

=== England ===
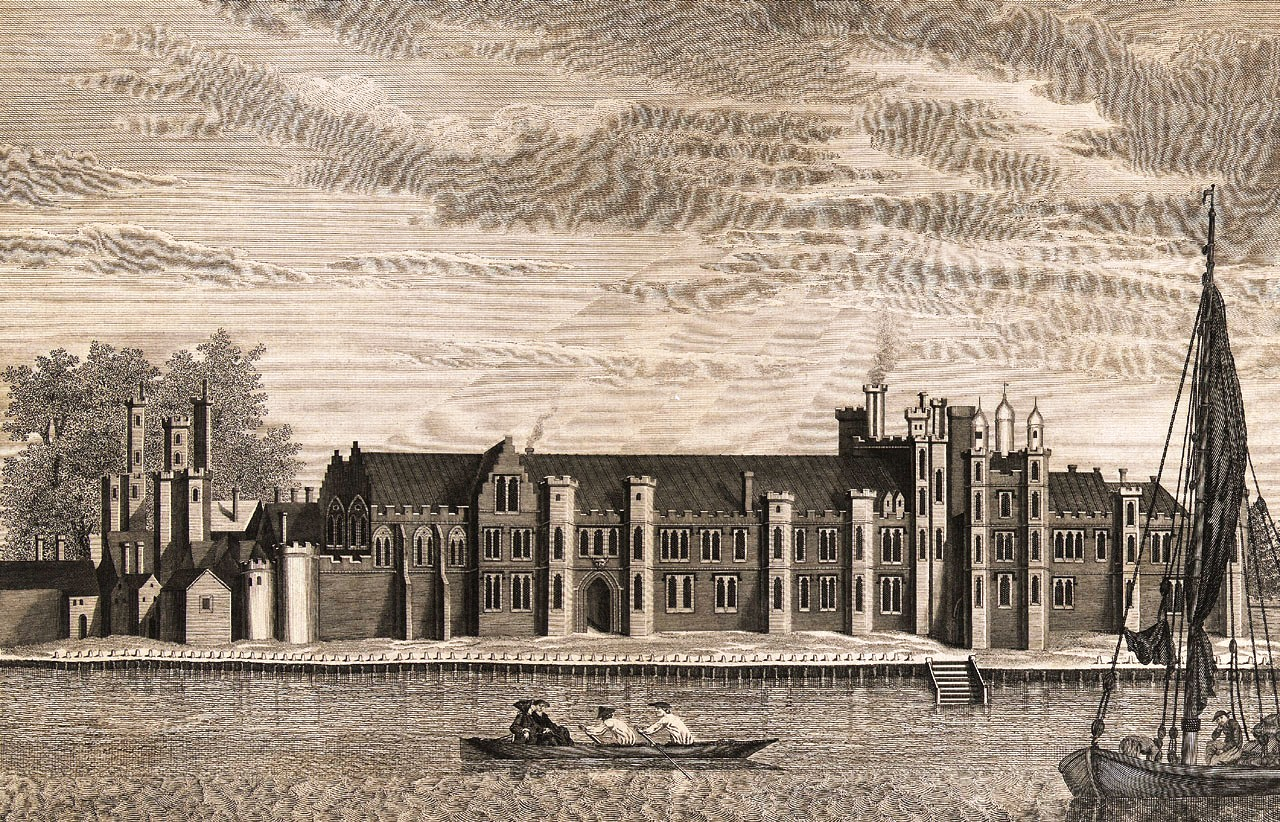
Greenwich Palace in the early 1600s; the chapel royal was at the east end of the main riverside range (left-of-centre in the picture).

The location of the United Kingdom's Chapels Royal has varied over the years. In the Tudor and early Stuart period, the chapel establishment moved with the monarch and court at regular intervals from palace to palace along the River Thames, spending weeks at a time at Greenwich Palace, Whitehall Palace, Richmond Palace and Hampton Court Palace, as well as at Windsor Castle. Following the Restoration, the reconstituted Chapel Royal was principally based at the Palace of Whitehall; fire destroyed the chapel there, and much of the rest of the palace, in 1698. Since 1702 the chapel's primary location has been St James's Palace.

The current Chapels Royal are all in Greater London; most of the buildings date from the Tudor period.

==== St James's Palace ====
The Chapel Royal in 1925, looking south (towards the Closet)

The Chapel Royal, St James's Palace, was built around 1540. The building is part of the main complex: it lies between Ambassadors' Court (to the west) and Colour Court (to the east), where it abuts the Great Gatehouse. The chapel is laid out on a north-south, rather than the usual east-west, axis and the altar is placed at the north end. When the gatehouse is viewed from Pall Mall, the large window to its right is the north window of the chapel (above the altar). The chapel interior includes an ornate coffered ceiling, 'one of the most important decorative Tudor ceilings in existence'. Reputedly painted by Holbein, it is richly illustrated with coats of arms and other motifs, including the initials 'H' and 'A' (for Henry VIII and Anne of Cleves) and the date 1540.

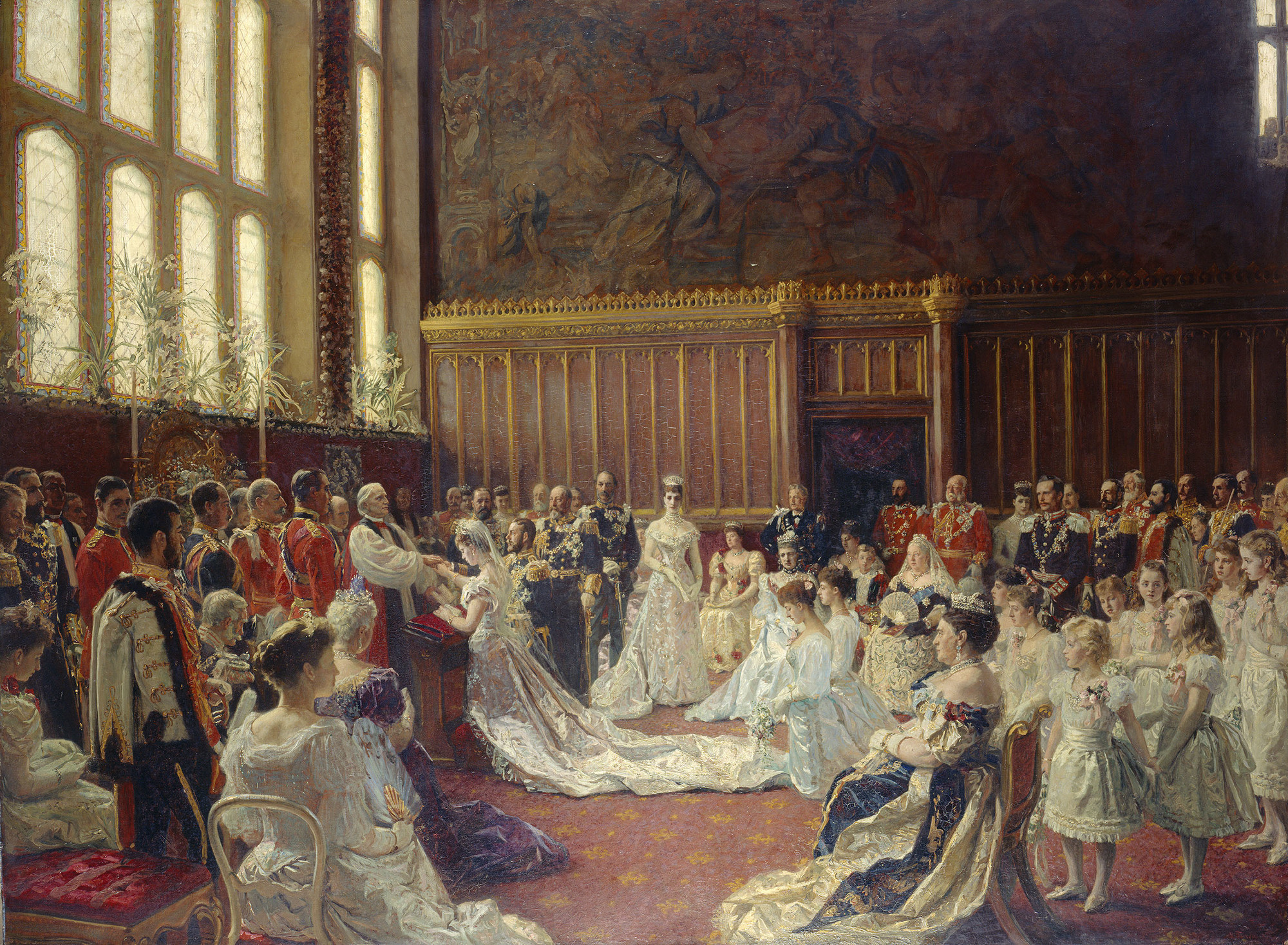
Prince George, Duke of York, and Mary of Teck at the Chapel Royal in St James's Palace, 1894

Sir Robert Smirke restored the chapel in 1837. As part of this work, the Closet (the south gallery containing the royal pew) was reduced in size (it had previously extended on pillars into the body of the chapel). The newly-exposed ceiling at the south end was made to match the Tudor work, and decorated with the cyphers of King William IV and Queen Adelaide. Box pews, arranged lengthwise, were installed in the chapel in 1876; and in 1894 choir stalls were inserted on either side of the altar.

A German bomb dropped on Pall Mall in 1940 destroyed the north window and the sanctuary furnishings; the building was restored a few years later, and further altered in the late 1960s. In 2002, the chapel was reordered and redecorated to mark the Golden Jubilee of Elizabeth II. As part of this refurbishment, a new set of stained-glass windows was installed above the altar, depicting a large tree arrayed with the names of the 54 nations of the Commonwealth.

===== The Queen's Chapel =====
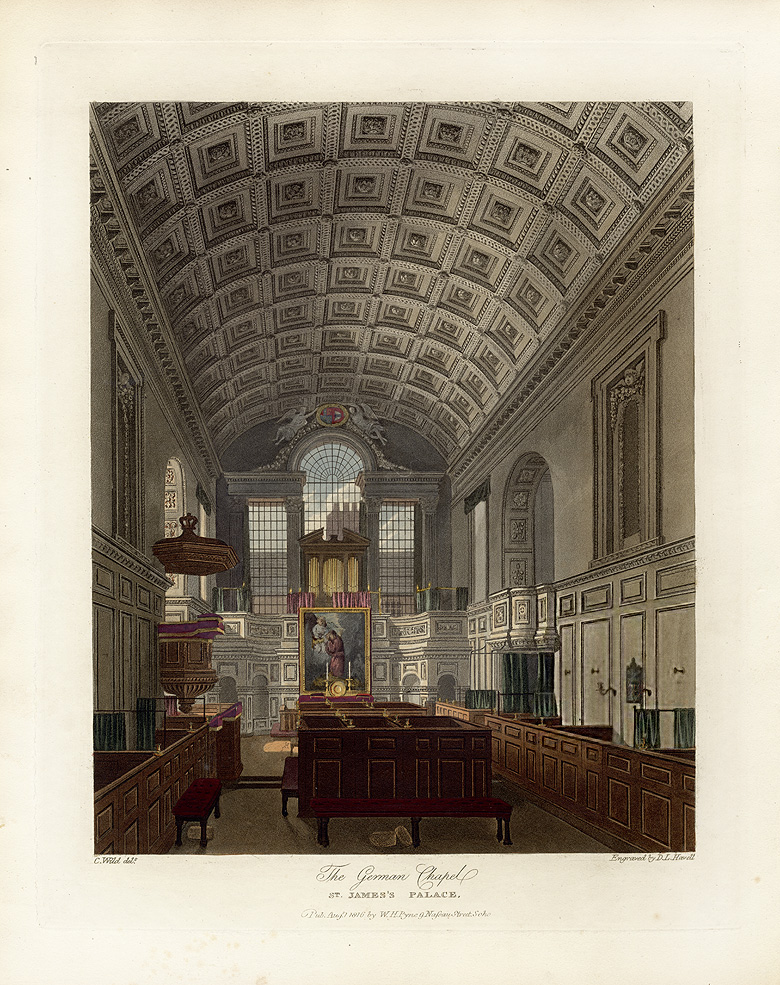
The 'German Chapel' in 1816

The separate Queen's Chapel, once also physically connected to the main building of St James's Palace, was built between 1623 and 1625 as a Roman Catholic chapel for Queen Henrietta Maria, consort of Charles I, at a time when the construction of Roman Catholic churches was otherwise prohibited in England. After the Commonwealth period it was restored to use by Charles II for his queen, Catherine. In the 1690s, William III authorised the use of the Queen's Chapel by Dutch and French Reformed congregations; it later came to be known as the French Chapel. At the same time, chapel in the south range of what is now Friary Court was made available as a place of worship for German Lutheran courtiers. The "Minister for many years" of the "royal French chapel" at St James's Palace was Pierre Rival (d. 1730), one of whose sermons is published as no: Sermon prononcé le 7 de Juillet 1713 jour d'action de graces pour la paix dans la chapelle royale françoise du palais de Saint James. In 1781 the French and German congregations exchanged premises; the Queen's Chapel then came to be known as the German Chapel, and the Friary Chapel the French Chapel. The adjacent palace apartments (including the French Chapel) burnt down in 1809; they were not rebuilt and, between 1856 and 1857, Marlborough Road was laid out between the palace and the Queen's Chapel. In 1880 Queen Victoria gave permission for a Danish Church congregation to use the Queen's Chapel, for the benefit of the Princess of Wales (later Queen Alexandra) and her household. The German congregation moved out (to a new church in Montpelier Place) in 1902. The Danish congregation continued to use the chapel until 1938 (when they moved to St Clement Danes); the Queen's Chapel then, at Queen Mary's suggestion, became part of the Chapel Royal and has since then been used for regular services in the summer months (from Easter to the end of July).

==== Hampton Court Palace ====
The chapel interior

The chapel at Hampton Court Palace has been a Chapel Royal since the 1530s (when King Henry VIII acquired the palace from Cardinal Wolsey). Henry enlarged the chapel, which was later refurbished under Queen Anne. The palace remained a royal residence up until the death of Queen Caroline, consort of George II, in 1737. From the reign of George III the palace provided grace and favour apartments and the chapel continued to serve the resident community.

The choral tradition had ceased with the departure of the royal court in 1737, but under Queen Victoria (who opened the palace to the public in 1838) a new permanent choral foundation was created in 1868. The choir, which sings on Sundays and major feast days, consists of 14 boy members and six gentlemen members. An organ was built in 1712 and, most recently, restored in 2013. In 2004 Elizabeth II and Prince Philip attended a service in the chapel marking the 400th anniversary of the Hampton Court Conference (which was probably the first time a monarch had worshipped there since the 1730s). Since 2017 it has served as the Chapel of the Order of the Companions of Honour; a service marking the centenary of the order that year was likewise attended by the Queen and her husband.

==== Tower of London ====
St John's Chapel

There are two Chapels Royal at the Tower of London. The Chapel of St John the Evangelist (located within and contemporary with the White Tower) dates from 1078. The current Chapel of St Peter ad Vincula dates from 1520 (but previously there may have been a pre-conquest chapel on the same site). The old St Peter's (the predecessor of the current building) was in place by 1200; it was rebuilt by Edward I in 1286-87 but burned down in 1512.

St Peter ad Vincula

Historically St John's was the chapel used by the sovereign and the royal court, whereas St Peter's served the garrison and staff. On the eve of the coronation of King Henry IV in 1399, the Knights of the Bath kept an all-night vigil in St John's Chapel; this practice continued on the night before each coronation up until 1559 (whereupon the vigil was relocated to St Peter ad Vincula, where it continued to be held until 1661). Subsequently St John's chapel stopped being used for services, and by 1570 it was serving as a repository for public records. By this time the use of the Tower as a royal residence had greatly reduced (though monarchs continued to stay at the Tower on the night before their coronation, up until the Interregnum). In 1858 (following the opening of a new Public Record Office) St John's reverted to being used as a place of worship (for non-conformist members of the Tower garrison). Meanwhile St Peter's continued to serve the garrison and the wider Tower community. Those who were executed on Tower Green (between 1483 and 1601) were buried in St Peter's, as were the bodies of a number of those executed on Tower Hill (including Thomas More, John Fisher and Thomas Cromwell).

In 1965, when the garrison left the Tower, a successful appeal was launched to establish a choral foundation for the Tower's Chapels Royal. Today choral services are sung regularly on Sundays by the twelve-person choir, usually in the Chapel of St Peter ad Vincula. In 2014, following a programme of refurbishment in St Peter's, a special service was held there attended by Elizabeth II and Prince Philip.

==== Savoy Chapel ====
Interior of the Savoy Chapel

The King's Chapel of the Savoy ('commonly known', in the 19th century, 'as the Chapel Royal of the Savoy') has a unique status: it is the monarch's by right of his Duchy of Lancaster (Liberty of the Savoy). In 2016, it was brought for ecclesiastical purposes within the jurisdiction of the chapels royal. The chapel maintains a choir of six Gentlemen and around twenty boys, who are pupils at St Olave's Grammar School.

The chapel, which is dedicated to St John the Baptist, dates from around 1515, when the Savoy Hospital (a charitable foundation endowed by King Henry VII) was completed; it was originally one of three chapels within the hospital complex. The hospital closed in 1702 and its dormitories then served as a barracks for most of the 18th century. In the Savoy Chapel, the congregation of St Mary le Strand worshipped (their own building having been demolished to enlarge the Savoy Palace); during this time (and for many years afterwards) the chapel was often known as 'St Mary-le-Savoy', between 1549 and 1723. Prior to the Clandestine Marriages Act 1753, the chapel was well-known as a venue for such marriages. In 1816 most of the old hospital buildings were demolished to make way for Waterloo Bridge, leaving only the chapel standing. A serious fire in 1864 gutted the chapel's interior, which Queen Victoria then had rebuilt by Sydney Smirke. In 1937 King George VI made the Savoy Chapel the chapel of the Royal Victorian Order.

Queen Elizabeth II attended a service in the Savoy Chapel in 2012, accompanied by her husband Prince Philip, to unveil a stained-glass window commemorating her Diamond Jubilee.

==== Other royal chapels ====
===== Brighton =====
The church known as the Chapel Royal, Brighton was built as a proprietary chapel in 1793-95 by the Vicar of Brighton, the Rev. Thomas Hudson, who hoped to attract the Prince of Wales (the future King George IV) to attend services there, and at the same time to alleviate overcrowding in the parish church of St Nicholas. The prince laid the foundation stone and attended the inaugural service, but his attendance afterwards was sporadic (and ceased all together after a controversial sermon was preached). In 1803, the building became a chapel of ease, first to St Nicholas's and later to St Peter's Church, Brighton. The chapel was formally separated from St Peter's parish in 2010 and became a parish in its own right.

===== Buckingham Palace =====
The Christening of Princess Helena in the chapel of Buckingham Palace (1846)

In the early 1840s, Queen Victoria and Prince Albert created a chapel in what had been a conservatory, designed by John Nash, within Buckingham Palace; it was converted by Edward Blore and consecrated on 25 March 1843. (Though initially referred to as the 'Chapel Royal of Buckingham Palace', it was usually termed a private chapel.) A number of Victoria's children were baptized in the 'Chapel within Buckingham Palace', beginning with their third child, Princess Alice, on 2 June 1843. In 1863, following the death of Prince Albert, moves were made (at the Queen's request) for Sunday services to be sung by the Chapel Royal choir 'in H.M. private chapel at Buckingham Palace' at 9 am and 12 noon; but the plan never achieved fruition. Services in the chapel continued to be taken by a resident chaplain, and only when the monarch herself was in residence.

On 13 September 1940 (during World War II) the chapel in Buckingham Palace was destroyed by enemy bombing. What was left of the building was eventually incorporated into the Queen's Gallery (opened in 1962), where it is known as the Nash Room. Separately, a small private chapel was created nearby in the south-western part of the palace. This was renovated for the Golden Jubilee of Elizabeth II in 2002.

===== Kensington Palace =====
The Chapel Royal, Kensington Palace, came into being after William and Mary acquired into the building (newly-refurbished by Sir Christopher Wren) in the late 17th century. It was 'in the usual style of the period: an oblong room with oak panelling, carving, and classical windows'. Up until 1760 Kensington Palace served as the monarch's principal London residence, and the king or queen regularly worshipped in the chapel; subsequently, the palace provided accommodation for the extended royal family. In 1834 the location of the chapel was moved to 'a small plain room by the Council Chamber on the ground-floor'. Services continued, overseen by a Chaplain of the Household, until 1901 when the chapel was closed.

A century later, in 2002, the Chapel Royal, Kensington Palace was restored to use as a place of worship for the Golden Jubilee of Elizabeth II.

===== Whitehall =====
The Chapel Royal (the old Banqueting House), Whitehall in 1810

The Chapel Royal in Whitehall Palace was attached to the east end of the Great Hall; both buildings were left in ruins following the 1698 fire. Subsequently, the Banqueting House (which had survived the conflagration) served as the Chapel Royal, Whitehall. In 1702 the Chapel Royal establishment moved from Whitehall to St James's Palace, but choral services continued to be held in the Banqueting House until 29 October 1890, when the Chapel Royal, Whitehall, ceased to operate.

===== Windsor =====
Within the Lower Ward of Windsor Castle is one of the largest royal peculiars: The King's Free Chapel of St George; it is governed by its own college (the Dean and canons of Windsor), and is separate from the Chapels Royal. Nevertheless, in recent centuries (up until 1976) the appointment of a new dean was gazetted as being 'to the Deanery of Her Majesty's Chapel Royal in the Castle of Windsor'. (Subsequent appointments have been 'to the Deanery of Her Majesty’s Collegiate Church or Free Chapel of Saint George in the Castle of Windsor'.)

Within the Upper Ward of the castle, among the state rooms close to the royal apartments, is a smaller private chapel.

Not far from the castle, within the grounds of Royal Lodge in Windsor Great Park, is the Royal Chapel of All Saints.

===== Others =====
Other chapels with a royal title include the Royal Foundation of St Katharine in Tower Hamlets and the Royal Chapel of St Katherine-upon-the-Hoe in the Royal Citadel, Plymouth (in 1927, King George V re-granted the title royal chapel to this Garrison Church).

== See also ==
- Equivalents in other countries:
  - Capela Real, Portugal
  - Capilla Real de Granada, Spain
  - Capilla Real de Madrid, Spain
  - Chapelle royale, France
  - Hofkapelle
  - Royal Chapel (Sweden)
- Anglican church music
- Chaplain to the King
- Religion in Canada
- Religion in the United Kingdom

== Bibliography ==
- Baldwin, David (1990). The Chapel Royal: Ancient and Modern. London: Gerald Duckworth & Co. Ltd.
- "London (i), §II, 1: Music at court: The Chapel Royal", Grove Music Online ed. L. Macy (Accessed 16 September 2004), Grovemusic.com
- The Buildings of England, London 6: Westminster (2003) page 587.
- "Blow, John." Grove Music Online ed. L. Macy (Accessed 13 December 2006), Grovemusic.com
- "Purcell." Grove Music Online ed. L. Macy (Accessed 13 December 2006), Grovemusic.com
- Rogers, Charles (1882). History of the Chapel Royal of Scotland. London: British Topographical Society.
- Sheppard, Edgar (1894). Memorials of St James's Palace (Vol. II). London: Longmans, Green and Co.
- Sinclair, William (1912). The Chapels Royal. London: Eveleigh Nash.
