= Tower Green =

Courtyard within the Tower of London

Coordinates: 51°30′29.1″N 0°4′37.2″W

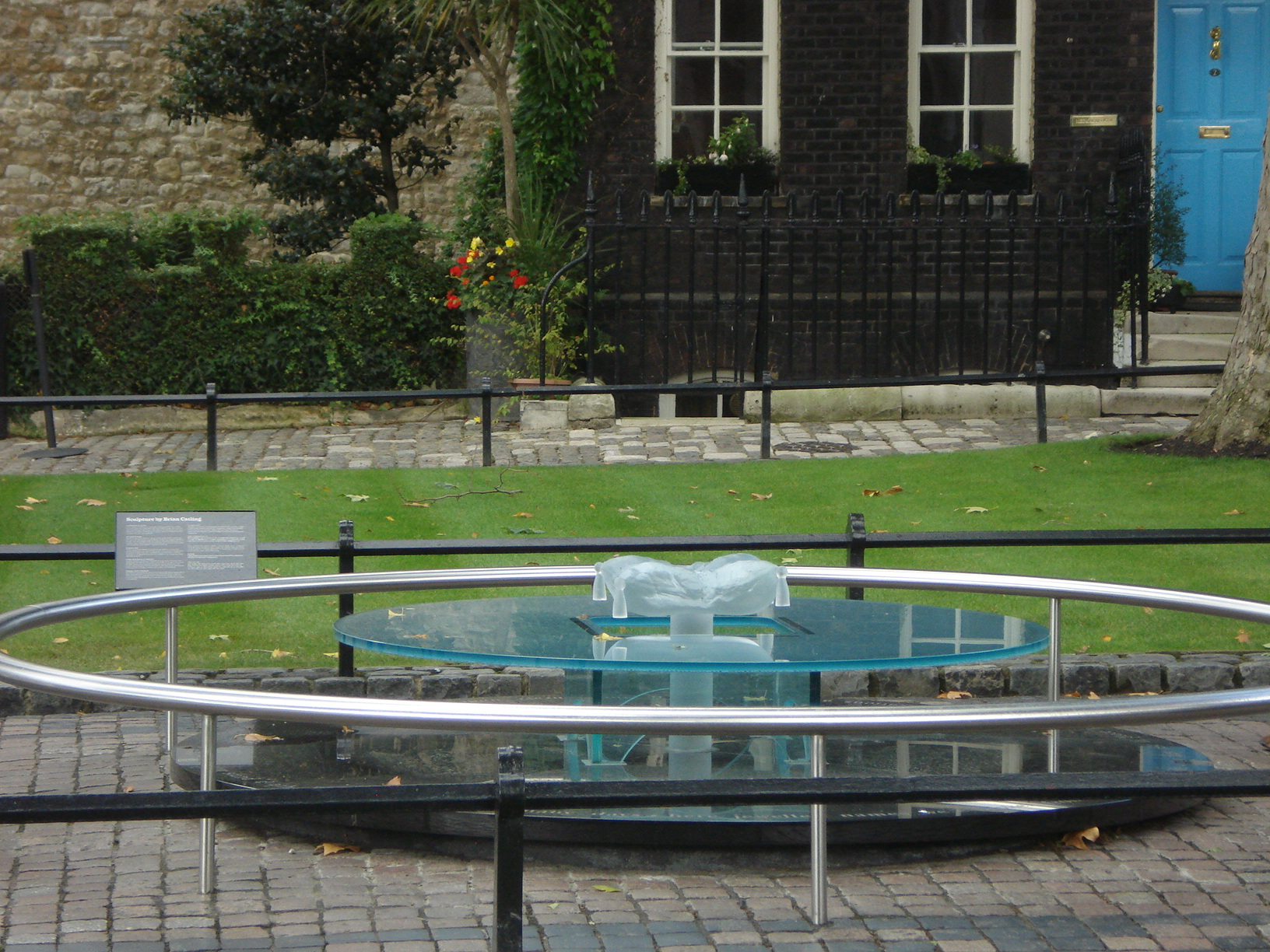
The commemorated spot on Tower Green where the execution scaffolds were erected

Tower Green is a space within the Tower of London, a royal castle in London, where three English queens and several other British nobles were executed by beheading. It was considered more dignified for nobility to be executed away from spectators, and queens consort Anne Boleyn and Catherine Howard, and Lady Jane Grey, briefly queen regnant, were among the nobility beheaded here. Queen Victoria asked for information on the exact location where the executions took place and had some granite paving laid to mark the spot. However, it is unclear whether the location is indeed correct, because other sources place it on what is now the parade ground between the White Tower and the entrance to the current Waterloo Block.

== Location ==
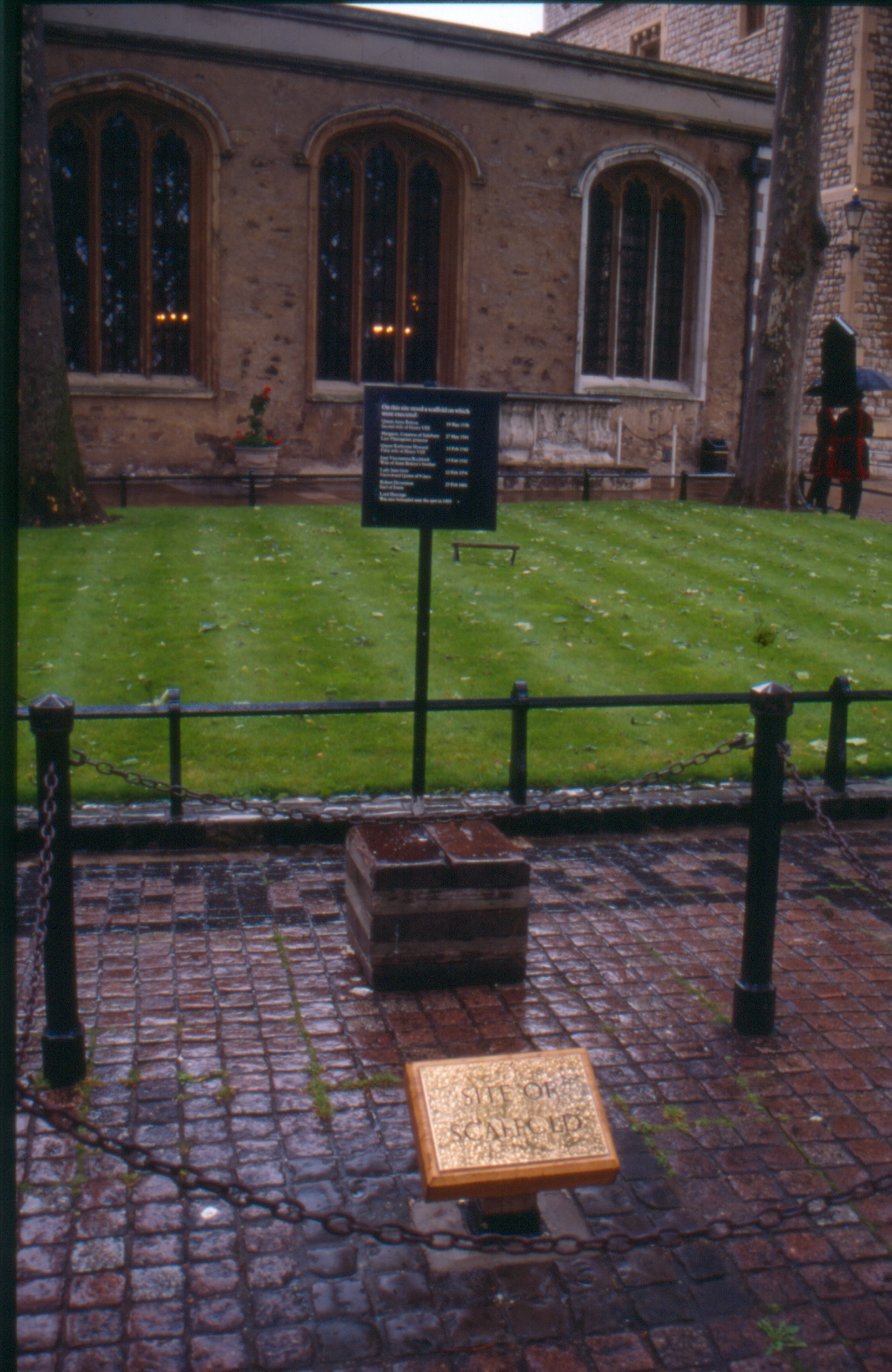
Side of the Church of St Peter ad Vincula viewed across Tower Green

Tower Green is an open space located south of the Chapel Royal of St. Peter ad Vincula. Beheading in the privacy of the Tower Green was considered a privilege of rank; the executed were spared insults from jeering crowds, and the monarch was spared bad publicity. Other prisoners in the tower were executed in public on Tower Hill, just outside the fortress, or at Tyburn on the other side of the city. In the middle of the green, a small square plot is paved with granite, which shows the site commonly believed to be the spot on which stood the scaffold on which private executions took place. The granite paving was specially created by order of Queen Victoria.

There is dispute that the memorial site is actually the scaffold site. It appears that there are sources that indicate that the site of the current memorial is merely a spot incorrectly pointed out to Queen Victoria, by an unknowing Yeoman Warder, when she inquired about the scaffold site during a visit to the Tower. Other sources describe Anne Boleyn's final walk to the scaffold, at a location on the current parade ground, between the White Tower and the entrance to the Waterloo Block built in 1845.

== History ==
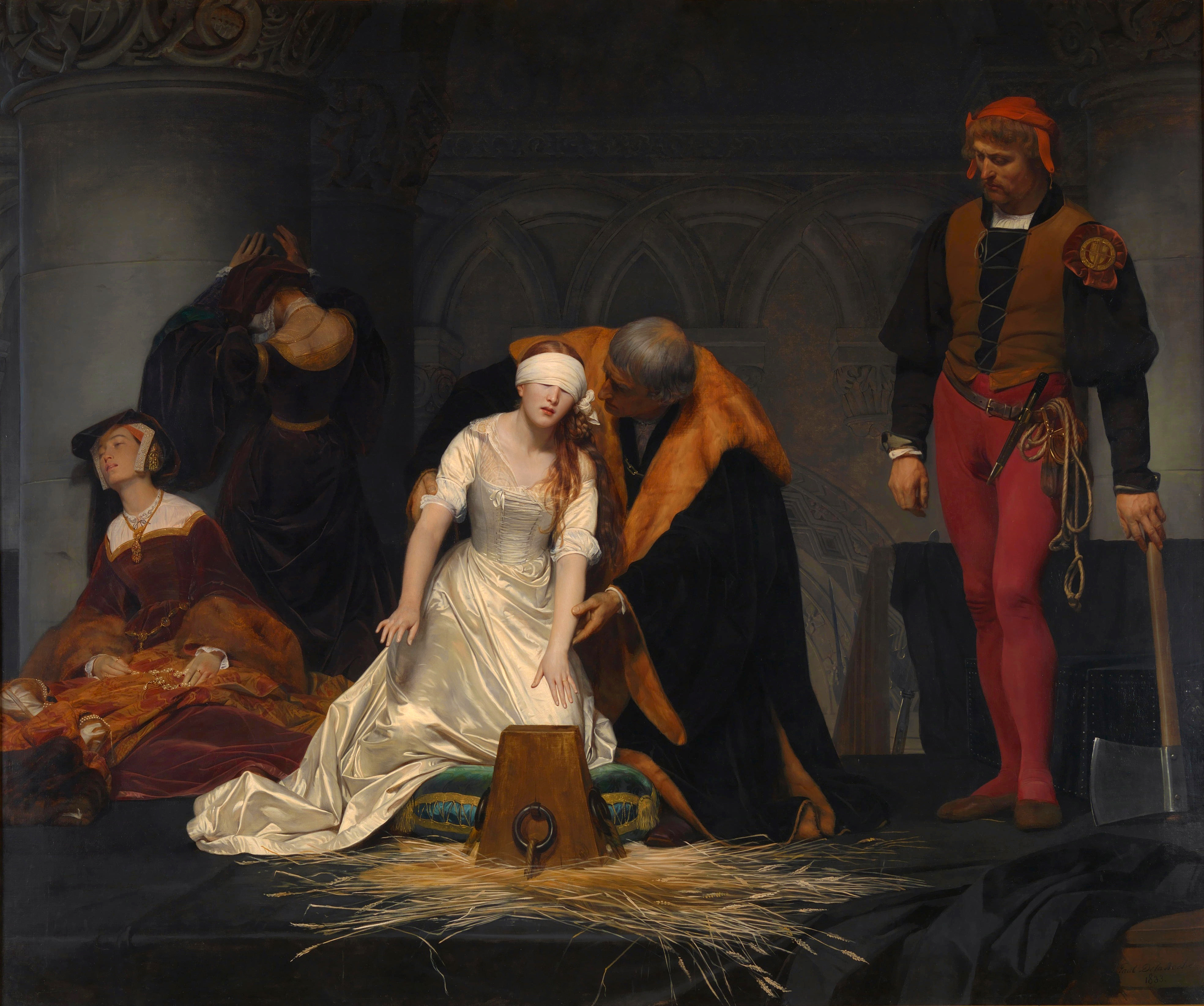
The Execution of Lady Jane Grey (le Supplice de Jeanne Grey) by the French Romantic painter, Paul Delaroche, 1833.

During the Middle Ages, the area was used as a burial ground. As a result of relaying the 19th century granite sett stones, shallow excavations of the foundations revealed remains of a building that sat on that site. Historic plans of the Tower of London show a building at the site of the Tower Green. It was demolished in 1684, but was rebuilt in 1685. It was removed once again soon thereafter. It appears that the building was used at the time as a guardhouse for the predecessors of the Yeomen Warders. The executions at the Tower Green were done inside this building to maintain the privacy of the nobles.

== Executions ==
The following nobles are known to have been executed by beheading (all by an axe except Anne Boleyn, who was beheaded with a sword) on the Tower Green:

1. William Hastings, 1st Baron Hastings, by order of Richard, Duke of Gloucester, in 1483.
2. Queen Anne Boleyn, second wife of King Henry VIII, 19 May 1536.
3. Margaret, Countess of Salisbury, the last of the Plantagenet dynasty on 27 May 1541.
4. Queen Catherine Howard, fifth wife of Henry VIII, by a bill of attainder on 13 February 1542.
5. Jane Boleyn, Viscountess Rochford, by order of Henry VIII on 13 February 1542.
6. Lady Jane Grey, the "Nine Days Queen", wife of Lord Guildford Dudley, by order of a special commission for High treason, on 12 February 1554.
7. Robert Devereux, 2nd Earl of Essex, for treason on 25 February 1601.

The bodies of all seven were buried in the Chapel of St Peter ad Vincula.

In addition to the seven listed above, there are three additional names listed on the memorial: Malcolm Macpherson, Samuel Macpherson and Farquhar Shaw. These men, soldiers of the Black Watch Regiment from the Scottish Highlands, were convicted of mutiny and were executed on the Tower Green on 19 July 1743 by a twelve-man firing squad composed of their fellow soldiers.
