= Kensington Palace Chapel =

- Denomination: Church of England
- Churchmanship: High church

Administration
- Province: None - royal peculiar

Kensington Palace Chapel is a private chapel in Kensington Palace in west London. It is a Chapel Royal. It is not open for regular public worship.

== History ==
The history of the chapel was given by the incumbent chaplain, Bullock, to Notes and Queries in 1879. The chapel was originally located between the Council Room and the palace's Great Staircase. The register of the chapel starts in 1871. In 1834 the chapel was moved to the north-west corner of the palace by Victoria, Duchess of Kent who required more living space. The Bishop of London, Charles James Blomfield declined to reconsecrate the new chapel as it was still located in the same building. Richard Bentley, chaplain to George I officiated at the chapel. Bentley was too afraid to travel from the chapel to St James's Palace after evening prayers as "the road was not safe". The chapel was "newly furnished" for the wedding of Anne, Princess Royal and William IV, Prince of Orange in 1734, but the wedding was held at St James's Palace due to William's prolonged recovery from illness. Caroline of Ansbach regularly attended services in the chapel. Anne Thackeray Ritchie set a chapter of her 1873 novel Old Kensington in the chapel. Queen Victoria received her first holy communion in the chapel in July 1834.

The chapel was later converted into residential space before being restored as a chapel by a conservation company in 2002. The present space is approximately 9 meters long with decoration including a "variety of antique features" and oak wall panelling. Renaissance era art pieces from the Royal Collection adorn the room, alongside a 19th-century brass hung chandelier.

Recent family events that have taken place at the chapel include the 2004 wedding of Lady Davina Windsor, and the 2015 christening of Isabella Windsor, daughter of Lord Frederick Windsor and Lady Frederick Windsor.

The inventory of the antique silver plate of the chapel compiled by Lionel and Philip Crichton is held as part of the Royal Collection. The organ in the chapel is believed to have been made by Benjamin Goodison and built c.1735.
