= Church of St Peter ad Vincula =

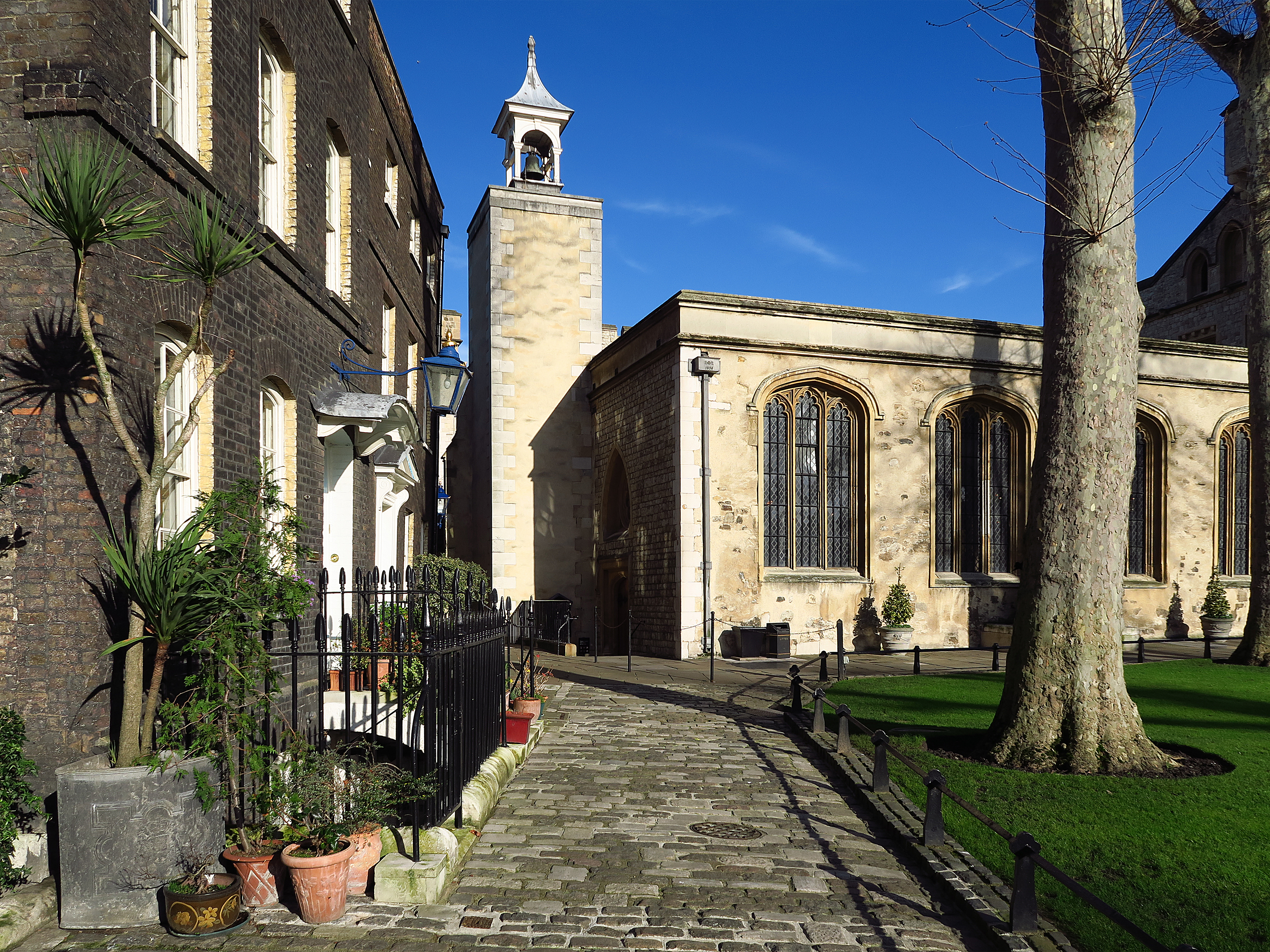
- Side of St Peter chapel that faces the place of execution on Tower Green

- The church in relation to the City of London
- 51°30′31″N 0°4′37″W
- OS grid reference: TQ 33560 80598
- Location: Tower Hamlets, London
- Country: England
- Denomination: Church of England
- Previous denomination: Roman Catholic

History
- Status: Active

Architecture
- Years built: 1519–20

Administration
- Diocese: Royal Peculiar

The Chapel Royal of St Peter ad Vincula ("St Peter in chains") is a Chapel Royal and the former parish church of the Tower of London. The chapel's name refers to the story of Saint Peter's imprisonment under Herod Agrippa in Jerusalem. Situated within the Tower's Inner Ward, its current building dates from 1520, although the church was likely established in the 12th century. This church for working residents was the second chapel established in the Tower after St John's, a smaller royal chapel built into the 11th-century White Tower. A royal peculiar, under the jurisdiction of the monarch, the priest responsible for these chapels is the chaplain of the Tower, a canon and member of the Ecclesiastical Household. The canonry was abolished in 1685 but reinstated in 2012.

At St Peter's west end is a short tower, surmounted by a lantern bell-cote, and inside the church is a nave and shorter north aisle, lit by windows with cusped lights but no tracery, a typical Tudor design. The Chapel is probably best known as the burial place of some of the most famous prisoners executed at the Tower, including Queen Anne Boleyn, Queen Catherine Howard, the "nine-day Queen", Lady Jane Grey (with her husband Lord Guildford Dudley) and the Lord High Chancellor, Sir Thomas More.

== History ==
The original foundation date and location for the chapel is unknown. The chapel has been destroyed, rebuilt, relocated and renovated several times. Some have proposed that the chapel was founded before the Norman Conquest of England as a parish church, predating the use of the area as a fortification. Others have concluded the chapel was founded by Henry I (r. 1100–1135), and perhaps consecrated on 1 August 1110 on the feast of St Peter ad Vincula. The chapel would have been outside the Tower's original perimeter walls so that the king could be seen worshipping in public. It would have stood in contrast to the king's use of the more private St John's Chapel, established around 1080 by William I inside the White Tower.

St Peter ad Vincula had been a parish church for at least a century before it became the chapel for the inhabitants of the Tower in the middle of the thirteenth century in the reign of Henry III, and the crypt under the church was built at that time. On 10 December 1241, Henry III issued a writ of liberate to have the ecclesia sancti Petri infra ballium Turris nostrae London (church of St Peter within the bailey of our Tower of London) enhanced. The writ indicates that by 1241 the chapel had been brought within the Tower walls. This structure had two chancels, dedicated to St Mary, and to St Peter; the latter contained Royal stalls that were wainscoted and painted, and there were two altars dedicated to St. Nicholas and St. Katherine.

During the reign of Henry III, the church had an enclosed cell for an anchorite, which would have been directly attached or located nearby. Henry III supported the living expenses of at least three different recluses, both men and women, at the Tower's anchorhold: Brother William, Idonee de Boclaund (an anchoress), and Geoffrey le Hermit. After 1312, it is likely the ceremonial vigil related to the induction of the Knights of the Bath were held in the church.

The chapel's dedication to "St Peter ad Vincula" has several possible meanings in the Norman-English context. The most obvious is in reference to the Liberation of Peter from prison, as first mentioned in Acts 12:3-19. The first prisoner of the Tower, Ranulf Flambard, the Norman Bishop of Durham, was incarcerated by Henry I on 15 August 1100.

=== Current edifice ===
The existing building was rebuilt for Henry VIII by the then Lieutenant of the Tower, Sir Richard Cholmondeley (whose tomb is in the Church), between 1519 and 1520, after a fire destroyed the church in 1512. The rebuilt chapel was probably designed by William Vertue.

=== Parish of the Tower of London ===
St Peter ad Vincula was the church of the extra-parochial area of Tower Within, part of the Liberties of the Tower of London. On 16 December 1729 the church was added to the bills of mortality, a record of burials in London, but was excluded in 1730 because of a successful claim by the inhabitants of it being extra-parochial and outside of the normal parish system. Extra-parochial places were eliminated in the 19th century, and in 1858 the area became a civil parish, following the Extra-Parochial Places Act 1857 (20 Vict. c. 19). The Tower of London liberty was dissolved in 1894, and the parish was absorbed by St Botolph without Aldgate in 1901. The Chapel is also the regimental church of The Royal Regiment of Fusiliers, whose connections with the Tower of London go back the 1685 raising of the Royal Fusiliers to guard the Tower and the Artillery train kept there. Officers of the regiment retain the right to get married there.

== Burials and monuments ==
The church contains many splendid monuments. In the north-west corner is a memorial to John Holland, 2nd Duke of Exeter, a Constable of the Tower, who died in 1447. Under the central arcade lies the effigy of Cholmondeley, who died in 1521, the year after he completed the rebuilding of the church. In the sanctuary, there is an impressive monument to Sir Richard Blount, who died in 1564 and is buried in the church, and his son Sir Michael, died in 1610, both Tudor Lieutenants of the Tower, who would have witnessed many of the executions. There is a fine 17th-century organ, decorated with carvings by Grinling Gibbons.

The church is the burial place of some of the most famous Tower prisoners, including Queen Anne Boleyn and Queen Catherine Howard, the second and fifth wives of King Henry VIII, respectively, and Lady Jane Grey, who was Queen of England for nine days in 1553. George Boleyn, Viscount Rochford, brother of Anne, was also buried here after his execution in 1536, as were Edmund Dudley and Sir Richard Empson, tax collectors for Henry VII, and Lord Guildford Dudley, husband to Lady Jane Grey, in February 1554, after being executed on Tower Green. Others were Sir Thomas More and Bishop John Fisher, who incurred the wrath of King Henry VIII, and after their execution, they were canonised as martyrs by the Roman Catholic Church; Philip Howard, a third saint who suffered under the Tudors, was also buried here for a time before his body was relocated to Arundel. After their executions, the following people were also buried here: King Henry VIII's minister, Thomas Cromwell (1540); Thomas Seymour, 1st Baron Seymour of Sudeley, the brother of Jane Seymour, uncle of Edward VI, who is remembered for his unseemly conduct towards his step-niece, Elizabeth I (1549); Edward Seymour, 1st Duke of Somerset (1552); John Dudley, 1st Duke of Northumberland and John Gates in connection with the 1553 succession crisis; and James Scott, 1st Duke of Monmouth, under the communion table (1685).

A list of "remarkable persons" buried in the chapel between 1534 and 1747 is listed on a table on the west wall. Thomas Babington Macaulay memorialised those buried in the chapel in his 1848 History of England:

In truth there is no sadder spot on the earth than that little cemetery. Death is there associated, not, as in Westminster Abbey and Saint Paul's, with genius and virtue, with public veneration and with imperishable renown; not, as in our humblest churches and churchyards, with everything that is most endearing in social and domestic charities; but with whatever is darkest in human nature and in human destiny, with the savage triumph of implacable enemies, with the inconstancy, the ingratitude, the cowardice of friends, with all the miseries of fallen greatness and of blighted fame. Thither have been carried, through successive ages, by the rude hands of gaolers, without one mourner following, the bleeding relics of men who had been the captains of armies, the leaders of parties, the oracles of senates, and the ornaments of courts.

During renovation work in 1876 three burials were discovered, identified as Anne Boleyn, Margaret Pole, Countess of Salisbury, and John Dudley, 1st Duke of Northumberland. The tomb of Sir Richard Cholmondeley, a former Lieutenant of the Tower of London, and his wife Elizabeth Pennington has been opened during the renovation, but was found to be empty. (Their remains are not there.) But it contained the original Tudor font, now re-instated to the chapel. It is believed to be hidden there before parliamentary troops.

== Chapel Royal ==
The church is a Chapel Royal and the priest responsible for it is the chaplain of the Tower of London, a canon and member of the Ecclesiastical Household. The canonry was abolished in 1685 but reinstated in 2012. Roger Hall was installed as a canon the same year.

The chapel can be visited as part of a specific tour within the Tower of London or by attending the regular Sunday morning service.
