= Royal peculiar =

English church under the direct jurisdiction of the monarch

A royal peculiar is a Church of England parish or church exempt from the jurisdiction of the diocese and the province in which it lies, and subject to the direct jurisdiction of the monarch.

== Definition ==
The church parish system dates from the early Middle Ages, when most early churches were provided by the lord whose estate land coincided with that of the parish. A donative parish (or "peculiar") was one that was exempt from diocesan jurisdiction. There are several reasons for peculiars but usually they were held by a senior churchman from another district, parish or diocese, and gave livings (salaries or use of property) to those clergy chosen by the donor or donor's heir. They could include the separate or "peculiar" jurisdiction of the monarch, another archbishop or bishop, or the dean and chapter of a cathedral (also, the Knights Templar and the Knights Hospitaller). An archbishop's peculiar is subject to the direct jurisdiction of an archbishop and a royal peculiar is subject to the direct jurisdiction of the monarch.

Most peculiars survived the Reformation but, with the exception of royal peculiars, were finally abolished during the 19th century by various Acts of Parliament and became subject to the jurisdiction of the diocese in which they lay, although a few non-royal peculiars still exist. The majority of royal peculiars that remain are within the Diocese of London.

== Present day ==
=== London ===
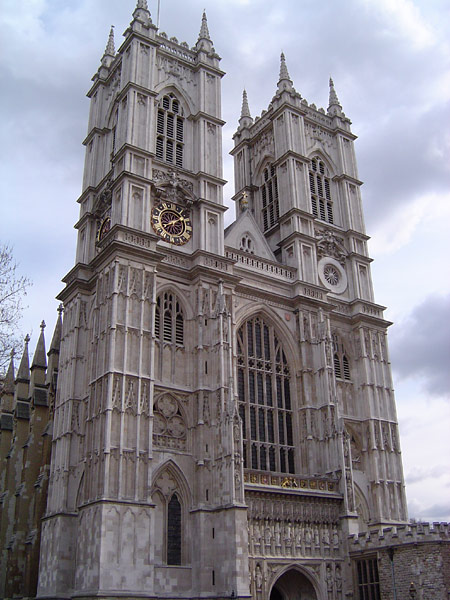
Westminster Abbey

- The Collegiate Church of St Peter at Westminster, commonly known as Westminster Abbey, and containing the Henry VII Chapel, which is the chapel of the Order of the Bath.
- The chapels associated with the Chapel Royal, which refers not to a building but to an establishment in the Royal household, a body of priests and singers who explicitly serve the spiritual needs of the sovereign. Since the 18th century, because the Bishop of London is customarily appointed the Dean of the Chapel Royal, the bishop typically has authority of these chapels as dean, instead of as bishop even though they are geographically within the Diocese of London.
  - The Chapel Royal, St James's Palace
  - The Queen's Chapel, St James's Palace
  - The Chapel Royal, Hampton Court
  - The Chapel of St John the Evangelist in the White Tower of the Tower of London
  - The Chapel of St Peter ad Vincula in the Inner Ward of the Tower of London
  - The King's Chapel of the Savoy, inaugurated as a Chapel Royal in November 2016, is a private chapel of the sovereign in right of the Duchy of Lancaster. It is the chapel of the Royal Victorian Order. The number of members of the order in recent years has outgrown the available space in the Savoy Chapel so the service for those who have received awards is now held in St George's Chapel, Windsor Castle, every four years.
- The Chapel of St Mary Undercroft, the crypt of the former St Stephen's Chapel in the Palace of Westminster. The building is administered through the Lord Great Chamberlain and Black Rod and it has no dedicated clergy: by convention services were conducted by the Rector of St Margaret's, Westminster, a member of the Chapter of Westminster Abbey. In 2010, the Speaker of the House of Commons used his right of appointment of his Chaplain to nominate an outsider, the Revd Rose Hudson-Wilkin.
- The Royal Foundation of St Katharine founded in 1147 by Queen Matilda of England as a religious community and medieval hospital for poor infirm people next to the Tower of London
- Temple Church, built in the 1100s by the Knights Templar in the City of London

=== Edinburgh ===
- Chapel Royal, Holyrood Palace

=== Cambridge ===
- The Church of St Edward, King and Martyr

=== Windsor ===
- St George's Chapel, Windsor Castle, the Chapel of the Order of the Garter
- Royal Chapel of All Saints (in the grounds of the Royal Lodge in Windsor Great Park)

== Former royal peculiars ==
- St Michael's Collegiate Church, Penkridge near Wolverhampton
- St Michael and All Angels' Church, Tettenhall, Wolverhampton 1247–1548
- Canons of Dover Priory, until 1130
- Holy Trinity, Minories, London, until 1730
- St Mary and St Alkelda, Middleham, North Yorkshire, until 1856
- St Nicholas' Chapel, the free chapel of Tickhill Castle (West Riding of Yorkshire - now South Yorkshire). Founded by Eleanor of Aquitaine c1174. Dissolved in the reign of Edward VI (1547-1553)
- Wimborne Minster, Dorset, 1318–1846
- St Peter's Collegiate Church, Wolverhampton, 1479–1846
- The Deanery of St Buryan, Cornwall, comprising St Buryan's Church in St Buryan, St Sennen's Church, Sennen, and St Levan's Church, St Levan, until 1850, and was a peculiar under the jurisdiction of the Duchy of Cornwall with the dean appointed by the duke.
- The Deanery of Bridgnorth, Shropshire, until 1856
- Dorchester Abbey in Dorchester on Thames, Oxfordshire, 1536–1837
- The Collegiate Church and Royal Free Chapel of St Mary the Virgin, St Mary's Church, Shrewsbury, until 1856
- St Mary's Church, Stafford

== Non-royal peculiars ==
- St Mary-le-Bow, City of London (until 1850)
- The Parish of Hawarden, Flintshire, Wales (until 1849)
- The Parish of Southwick, Hampshire (St James, Southwick and St Nicholas, Boarhunt) (Note: The parish is unique in being a 'peculiar' parish (one of only two left in the country). The chaplain was not appointed by the bishop but by the squire who is officially the 'Lay Prior, Ordinary, Patron and Rector of the Peculiar and Parish of Southwick'. This has been the case since the dissolution of Southwick Priory, in 1539. St Nicholas, Boarhunt dates from 1064, and St James, Southwick (officially St James-without-the-priory-gate), may also be pre-Norman Conquest, although it has less surviving original fabric.)
- Charterhouse chapel, Islington, London
- The Peculiar (or Peculier) of Masham, North Yorkshire
- Church of St Mary the Virgin, Hornby, North Yorkshire
- Christ Church, Oxford (Note: Christ Church is a joint foundation of a College of Oxford and the Cathedral Church of the Diocese of Oxford. The Crown is the "Visitor" of the cathedral not the Bishop.)
- All college chapels of the University of Oxford
- Christ Church, Bath, Somerset
- Chapel of St Lawrence, Warminster, Wiltshire; bought by the townspeople in 1574, administered by feoffees.

The following chapels of the Inns of Court are extra-diocesan, and therefore peculiars, but not royal:

- Lincoln's Inn Chapel
- Gray's Inn Chapel

== See also ==
- Exemption (Catholic canon law)
- Extra-parochial area
- Proprietary chapel

=== Related concepts in secular government ===
- Demesne
- Imperial immediacy
- Independent city
