= St John's Chapel, London =

Chapel inside the White Tower at the Tower of London

Coordinates: 51°30′28.7″N 0°4′33.2″W

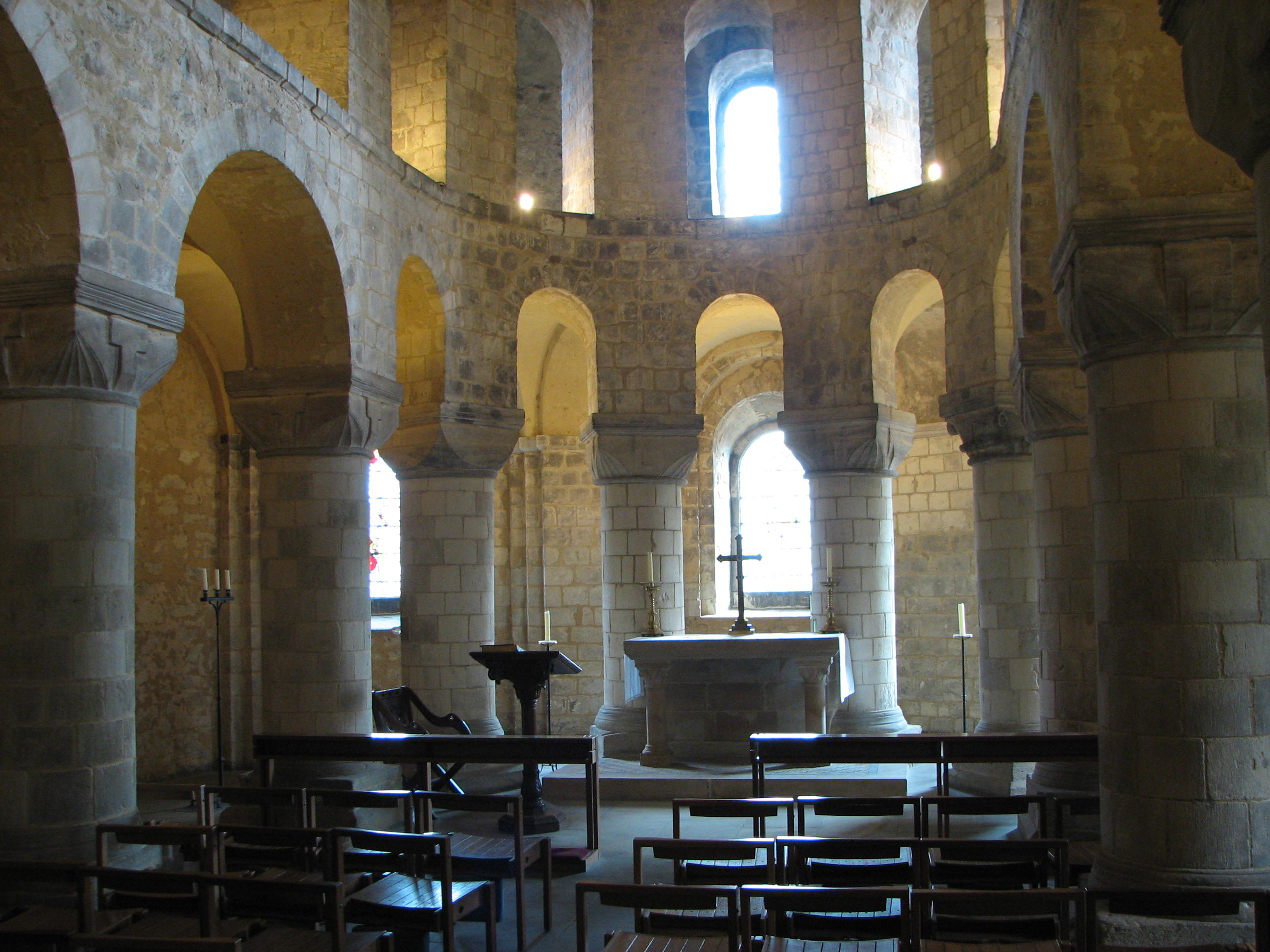
Apsidal end of the Chapel of St John inside the White Tower

The Chapel of St John the Evangelist (St John's Chapel) is an 11th-century Christian chapel of Norman architecture, in the White Tower of the Tower of London. Built in 1080, St John's is the oldest surviving complete chapel from the early Norman period, and functions today as a chapel royal. It is overseen by the Canon of the nearby castle Church of St Peter ad Vincula, who is the chaplain of the Tower.

== History ==
St John's Chapel was built as part of the original layout of the White Tower, which was constructed in 1077–97 as a keep or citadel, being the oldest part of William the Conqueror's powerful fortress. Constructed from Caen stone imported from France, St John's has a tunnel-vaulted nave with groin-vaulted aisles and an east apse, above and around which curve the gallery. Thick, round piers support unmoulded arches, notable for their simplicity, with simple carvings of scallop and leaf designs providing the only ornament. The programme of decoration was expanded by King Henry III, under whose orders three stained glass windows were installed in 1240.

Services are held in the chapel periodically during the year.

From 1100 to about 1312, Knights of the Bath were inducted by the purification ceremony of taking a ritual bath, and held vigil here the night before a royal coronation. The knights would then escort the monarch from the Tower to Westminster Abbey the following day. The ceremony was likely later observed in the larger church subsequently established in the Tower ward.

During the Peasants' Revolt of 1381, a mob gained access to the tower and found Archbishop of Canterbury and Chancellor of England, Simon Sudbury, at mass in the chapel. They dragged him outside to Tower Hill and murdered him.
