= White Tower (Tower of London) =

Central keep of the Tower of London

Coordinates: 51.508098°N 0.075977°W

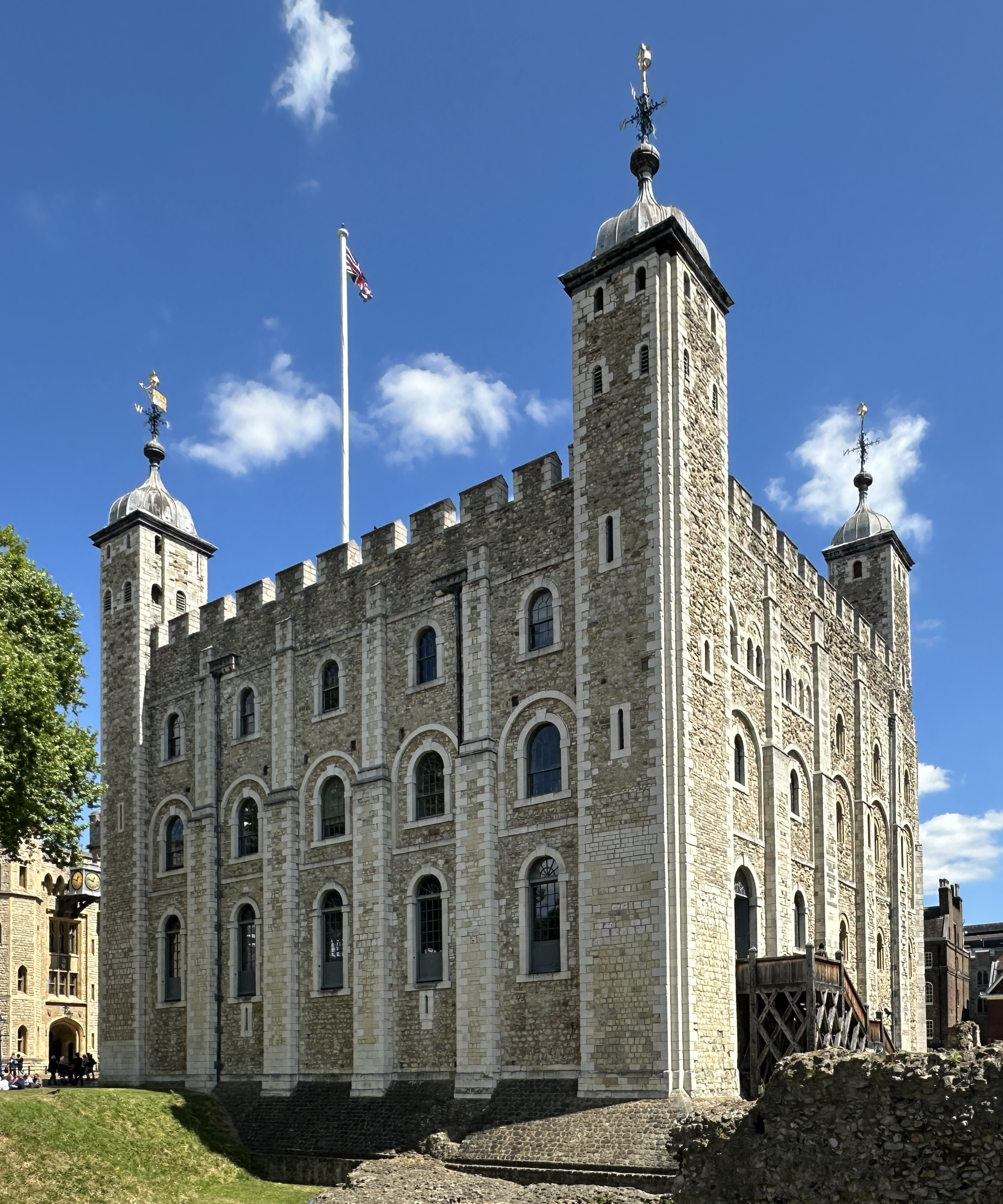
- The White Tower seen from the southwest

The White Tower is a former royal residence, the old keep, at the Tower of London in England. It was built by William the Conqueror during the early 1080s, and subsequently extended. The White Tower was the castle's strongest point militarily, provided accommodation for the king and his representatives, and housed a chapel. Henry III ordered the tower whitewashed in 1240. Today the Tower of London is a museum and visitor attraction. The White Tower now houses the Royal Armouries collections.

== History ==
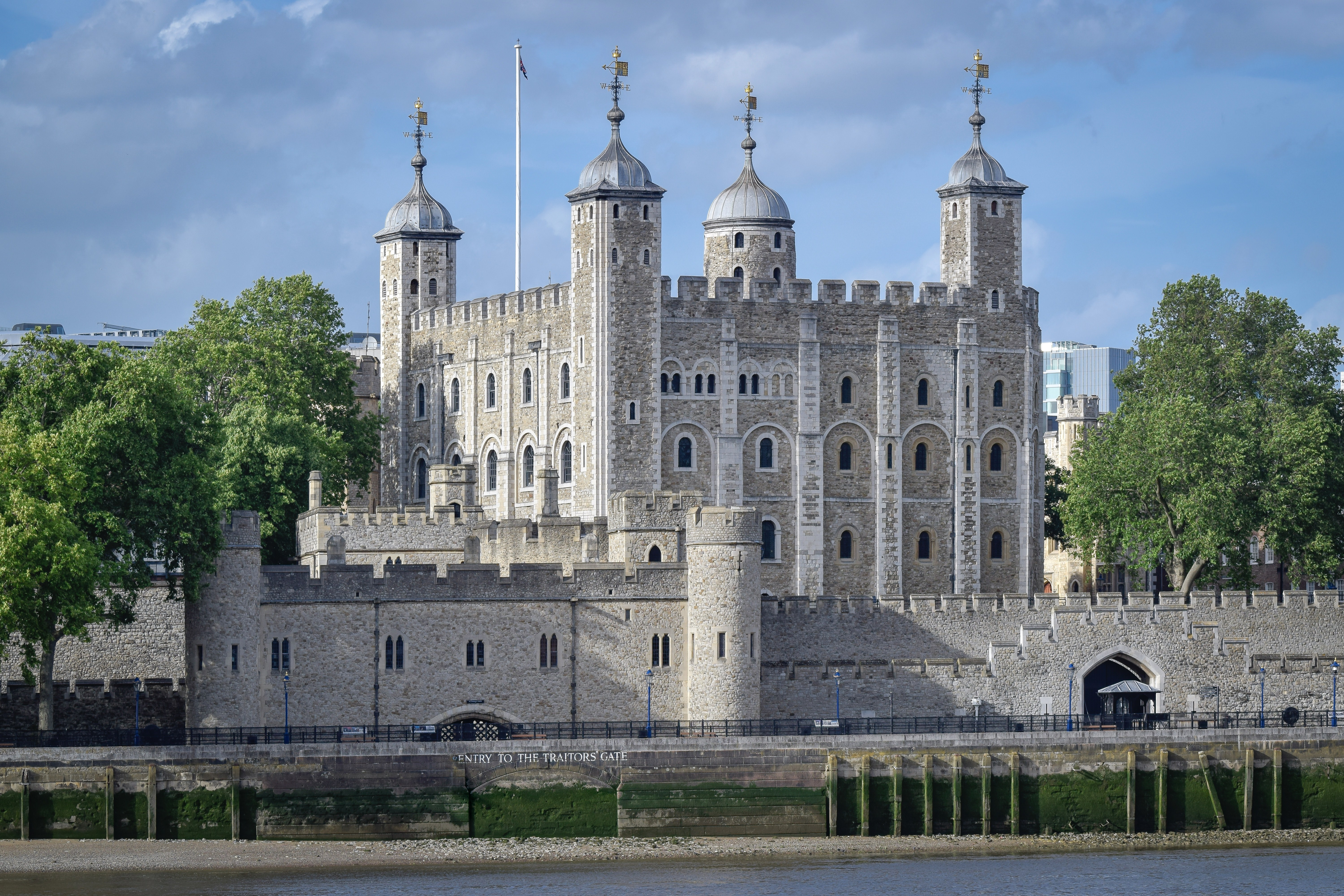
The White Tower seen from Tower Bridge

The castle which later became known as the Tower of London was begun by William the Conqueror in 1066 and was built as a timber fortification enclosed by a palisade. In the next decade work began on the White Tower, the great stone keep that still dominates the castle today. The precise date of the White Tower's foundation is unknown, and it is also uncertain how long the construction took. It is traditionally held that construction began in 1078. This is because the Textus Roffensis records that Gundulf, Bishop of Rochester, oversaw the building work under instruction from William the Conqueror. Dendrochronological evidence suggests construction of the White Tower began in 1075–1079. The archaeology of the standing building suggests there was a pause in construction between 1080 and 1090–1093, although it is unknown why. In 1995, historian Geoffrey Parnell found evidence on the interior side of a wall that, rather than there being a pause, building was completed with a structure two-thirds the present size with a pitched roof, not flat. It was only enlarged to its present size by William Rufus after a storm in 1090.

The White Tower was multi-purpose. It was the castle's strongest point militarily yet provided accommodation fit for the king and his representatives. In Norman architecture the keep was a symbol of a lord's power. The White Tower was probably complete by 1100 at the latest, at which point it was used to imprison Ranulf Flambard, Bishop of Durham. It was probably during Henry II's reign (1154–1189) that a fore-building was added to the south side of the tower to provide extra defences to the entrance, but it has not survived. Henry III's relations with his barons were uneasy, and in the 1220s and 1230s he enhanced the castle's defences and domestic buildings. Though the work he started may not have been finished within his lifetime, he extended the castle to the north and east, building a new stone wall to enclose the castle. A brattice (a timber gallery) was added to the top of the White Tower, projecting beyond its walls to better defend the base of the tower. Henry also undertook maintenance of the White Tower and it was during his reign that the tradition of whitewashing the building began. In March 1240 the Keeper of the Works at the Tower of London was ordered: "to have the Great Tower whitened both inside and out". Later that year the king wrote to the Keeper, commanding that the White Tower's lead guttering should be extended with the effect that "the wall of the tower ... newly whitened, may be in no danger of perishing or falling outwards through the trickling of the rain". Henry did not explain his order to whitewash the keep but may have been influenced by contemporary fashion in Europe to paint prestigious buildings white. He also added decoration to the chapel in the keep, adding stained glass, statues, and paintings.

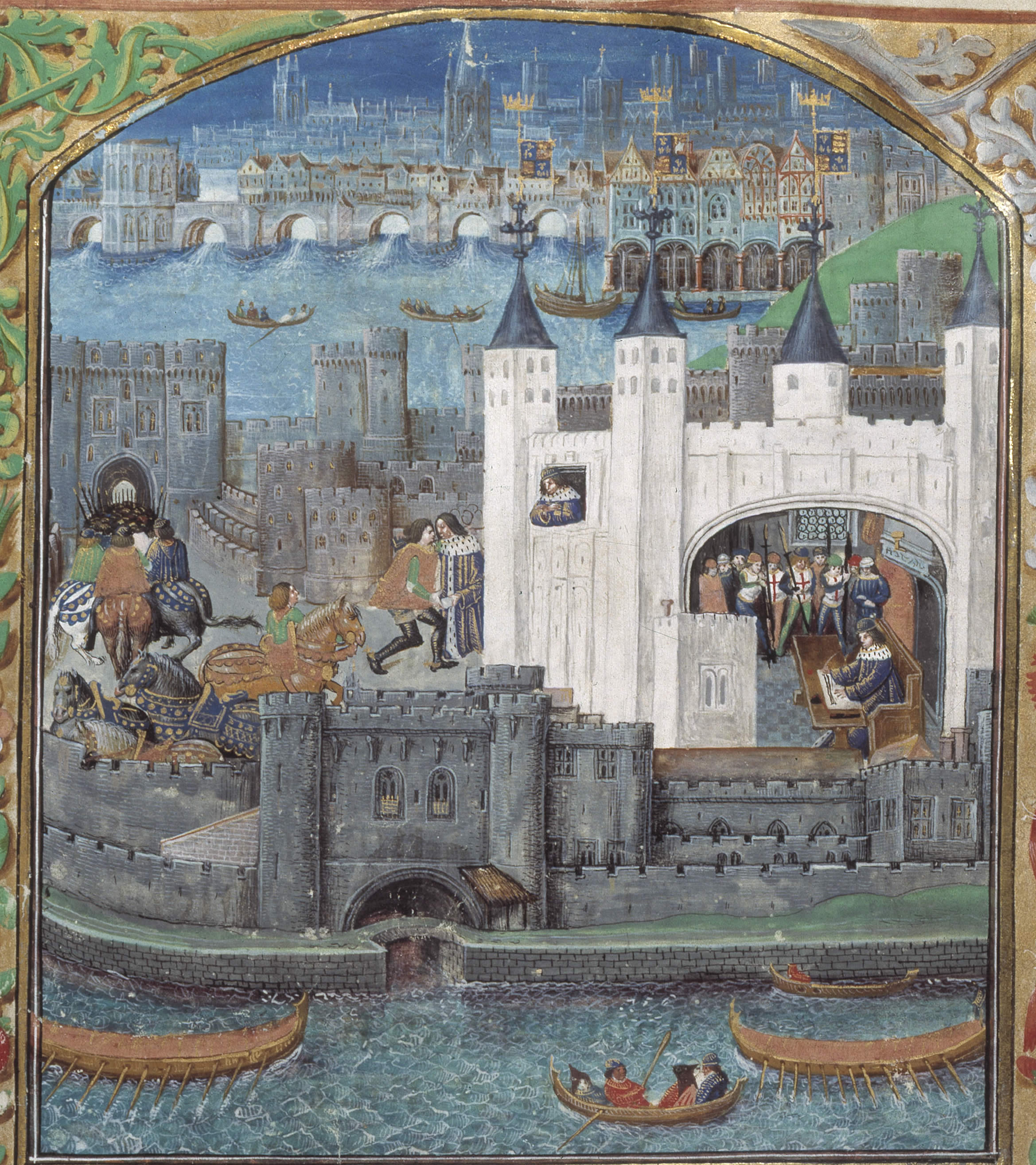
The 15th-century Tower in a manuscript of poems by Charles, Duke of Orléans (1394–1465), commemorating his imprisonment there. The white forebuilding to the left of the duke was demolished in 1674. Old London Bridge is in the background at top. (British Library).

Activity at the castle in the early 14th century declined relative to previous periods. Though the Tower of London was still occasionally used as a residence, by the 1320s the chapel in the White Tower was used to store records. This marked the beginning of the castle's diminishing role as a royal residence. The records were briefly removed from the White Tower in 1360 to accommodate the captive French king, John II. It may have been during the reign of Edward III (1327–1377) that a building abutting the south side of the White Tower was created. Built as storage, it may have been part of Edward's building programme at the Tower of London which saw its role as a military store come to the fore. The structure no longer survives, but is recorded on plans from 1597 and 1717.

Richard II was imprisoned at the Tower of London and abdicated there in 1399; according to tradition, the event took place in the White Tower. In the 1490s a new floor was added to the White Tower, creating extra storage. Architecturally virtually no trace remains of the White Tower's forebuilding, although it appears in a manuscript drawing c. 1500 depicting the imprisonment of Charles, Duke of Orléans and was recorded in a plan of 1597. It was demolished in 1674. On 17 June that year, during the course of the demolition, bones belonging to two children were discovered beneath the stairs in the forebuilding. It was assumed that they belonged to the Princes in the Tower. The remains were re-interred in Westminster Abbey. The story of the Princes in the Tower is one of the most infamous stories related to the castle. After the death of Edward IV his 12-year-old son was declared king as Edward V, but never crowned. Richard Duke of Gloucester was named Lord Protector while the prince was too young to rule. Edward was confined to the Tower of London along with his younger brother, Richard of Shrewsbury. The Duke of Gloucester was then proclaimed King Richard III in July 1483. The princes had last been seen in public in June 1483; the most likely reason for their disappearance is that they were murdered late in the summer of 1483.

By the Tudor period, the science of fortification had changed to deal with powerful cannons. The new designs, with low angled bastions, were not emulated at the Tower of London. All the same, some adaptations to use cannons were made; the changes included adding a timber platform to the top of the White Tower for cannon emplacements. The weight of the guns damaged the roof so that it had to be reinforced. The one documented use of these cannons was during Wyatt's rebellion in 1554 and they were ineffective. The Office of Ordnance and Office of Armoury were headquartered at the Tower of London until the 17th century. Their presence influenced activity at the castle and led to it becoming the country's most important military store. In the 1560s two armouries were created in the White Tower and by the reign of Elizabeth I (1558–1603) most of the gunpowder at the Tower was stored in the White Tower. By the last quarter of the 16th century the castle was a tourist attraction with visitors allowed inside despite its use by the Offices of Ordnance and Armoury. Its role in providing storage directly impacted on the White Tower's structure, and posts were added to support the floors. In 1636 a hole was knocked through the White Tower's north wall to ease the movement of provisions. In 1639–1640 the White Tower's external appearance was changed, with much of its facing material replaced.

In 1640 Charles I ordered that the Tower of London should be prepared for conflict. Platforms for cannons were built and 21 were installed on top of the White Tower with three additional mortars. Despite the new defences the Parliamentarians captured the Tower of London without the cannon being used. In January 1642, Charles I attempted to arrest five Members of Parliament. When this failed he fled the city, and Parliament retaliated by removing Sir John Byron, the Lieutenant of the Tower. The Trained Bands had switched sides, and now supported Parliament; together with the London citizenry, they blockaded the Tower. With permission from the King, Byron relinquished control of the Tower. Parliament replaced Byron with a man of their own choosing, Sir John Conyers. By the time the English Civil War broke out in November 1642, the Tower of London was already in Parliament's control. By 1657 the entire building apart from the chapel was being used to store gunpowder. Storing both gunpowder and government records in the White Tower was not ideal, and there were repeated suggestions in 1620, 1718, and 1832 to move the gunpowder to a new location, although the proposals were unsuccessful.

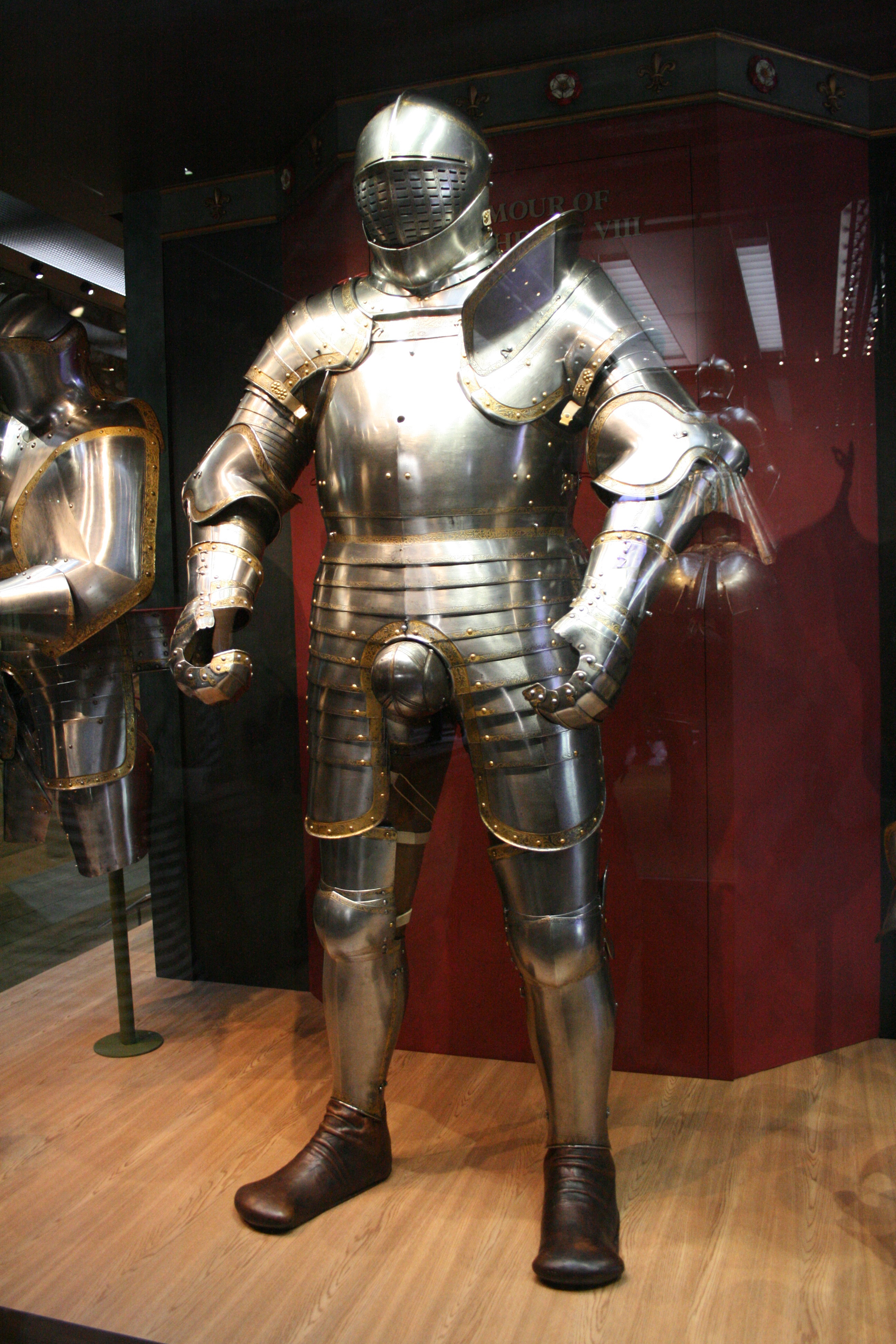
The Royal Armouries still have displays in the White Tower. This suit of armour belonged to Henry VIII.

By 1661 plans had been proposed to clear an area 6 metres (20 ft) around the White Tower to safeguard the dangerous material inside. Nothing was done until after the Great Fire of London in 1666. During the fire, it was feared the flames might reach the castle, specifically the White Tower, highlighting the need for safety measures. In the following years, a protective wall was built around the White Tower. In the 1670s buildings that had accumulated around the White Tower to provide storage for the Offices of Ordnance and Armoury were pulled down. After this, repairs were carried out on the face of the White Tower. A staircase was also added on the south face, allowing direct access to the records in the chapel.

While the Tower of London had been open to visitors for centuries, it was not until the early 19th century that alterations were made explicitly for visitors. In 1825 a building, the New Horse Armoury, to contain effigies of England's kings was constructed against the south of the White Tower. The Gothic revival design of the structure – one of the first purpose-built museums in England – was widely reviled. By the end of the century, the effigies and Queen Elizabeth's Armoury were distributed in displays in the White Tower. In the mid-19th century, under the encouragement of Prince Albert, Anthony Salvin undertook a programme of restoration at the castle. In 1858 the White Tower's roof was reinforced with iron girders. On 26 January 1885 a bomb in the White Tower damaged some of the displays.

The roofs of the White Tower and its turrets were repaired in the 1960s and 1970s. Accumulated dirt was washed from the exterior and the floors inside were replaced. Also in this period, a staircase was added against the south face of the keep, reopening access through the original entrance. In 1974, there was a bomb explosion in the Mortar Room in the White Tower, leaving one person dead and 35 injured. No one claimed responsibility for the blast, but the police investigated suspicions that the IRA was behind it. In 1988, the Tower of London as a whole was added to the UNESCO list of World Heritage Sites, in recognition of its global importance and to help conserve and protect the site. The Tower of London is in the care of Historic Royal Palaces, a charity, and between 2008 and 2011 a £2 million conservation programme was undertaken at the White Tower. Repairs were carried out and the keep was cleaned, removing pollution that was causing damage to the structure. The White Tower is a Grade I listed building, and recognised as an internationally important structure. The Royal Armouries still have displays at the White Tower.

== Architecture ==
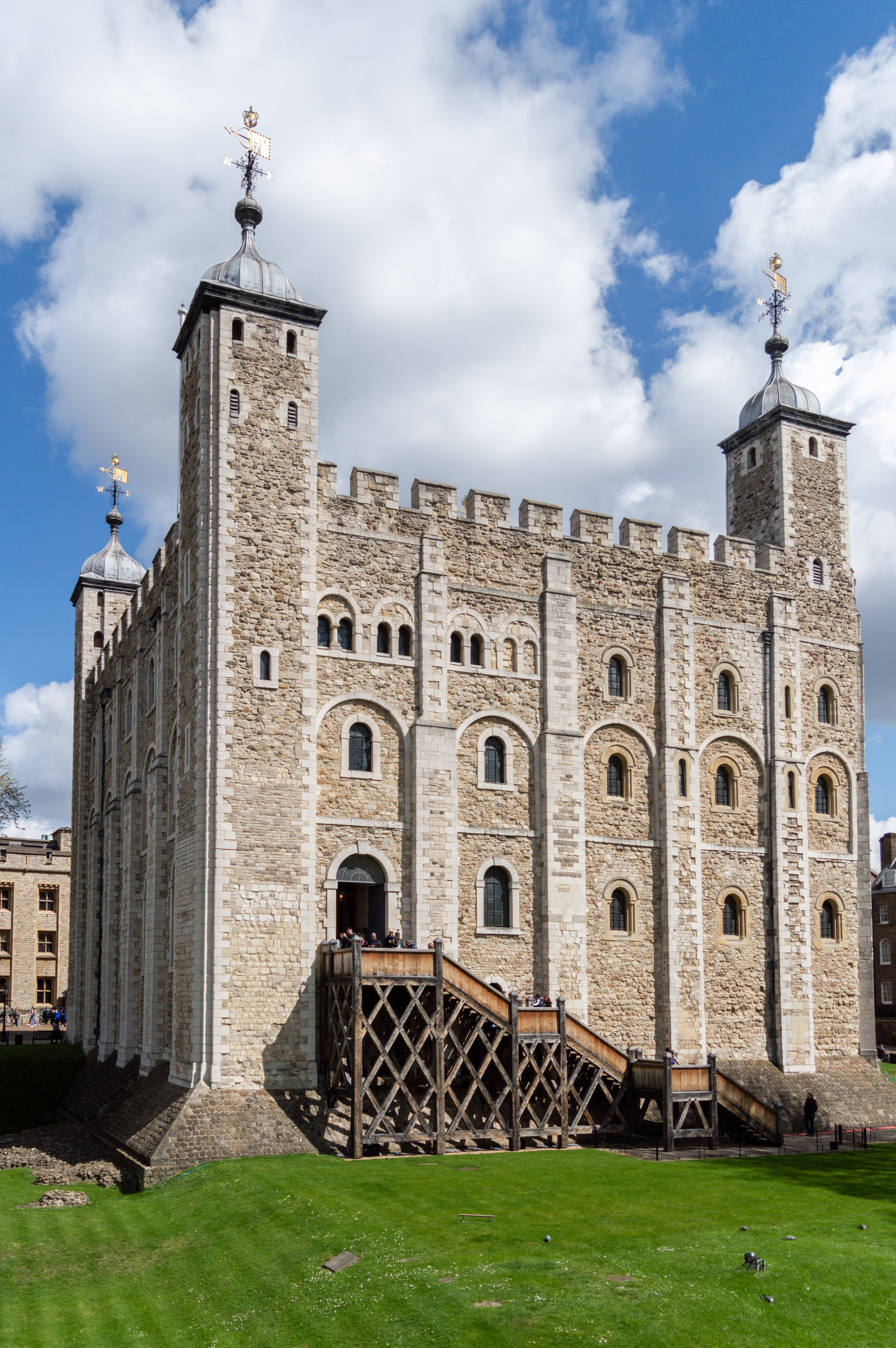
The original entrance to the White Tower was at first-floor level.

The White Tower is a keep (also known as a donjon), which was often the strongest structure in a medieval castle and contained lodgings suitable for the lord—in this case, the king or his representative. According to military historian Allen Brown, "The great tower [White Tower] was also, by virtue of its strength, majesty and lordly accommodation, the donjon par excellence". One of the largest keeps in the Christian world, the White Tower has been described as "the most complete eleventh-century palace in Europe". The influences on the White Tower's design are unclear. Magnates in northern France had been building stone keeps since the mid-9th century so the general design was well-established. More specifically the keep of Château d'Ivry-la-Bataille, built around 1000, may have been a particularly prominent influence as it included a semi-circular projection in one corner. Allen Brown and P. Curnow suggested that the design may have been based on the now vanished 10th-century keep of Château de Rouen, which belonged to the Dukes of Normandy.

At the western corners are square towers, while to the north-east a round tower houses a spiral staircase. At the south-east corner is a larger semi-circular projection which accommodates the apse of the chapel. Excluding its projecting corner towers, the keep measures 36 by 32 metres (118 by 105 ft) at the base, and rises to a height of and is 27 m (90 ft) high at the southern battlements where the ground is lower. The structure was originally three storeys high, comprising a basement floor, an entrance level, and an upper floor. The entrance, as is usual in Norman keeps, was above ground (in this case on the south face) and accessed via a wooden staircase which could be removed in the event of an attack. The forebuilding added in the 12th century no longer survives. As the building was intended to be a comfortable residence as well as a stronghold, latrines were built into the walls, and four fireplaces provided warmth.

The main building material is Kentish ragstone, though some local mudstone was also used. Although little of it survives, Caen stone was imported from northern France to provide details in the Tower's facing, much of it replaced by Portland stone in the 17th and 18th centuries under the direction of architect Inigo Jones. As most of the Tower's windows were enlarged in the 18th century, only two original – albeit restored – examples remain, in the south wall at gallery level. The White Tower was terraced into the side of a mound, so the northern side of the basement is partially below ground level.

=== Interior ===
The purpose of each room is interpreted based primarily on its design. As a result, there can be some ambiguity in what individual chambers were used for. Each floor was divided into three chambers, the largest in the west, a smaller room in the north-east, and the chapel taking up the entrance and upper floors of the south-east. As was typical of most keeps, the bottom floor was an undercroft used for storage. One of the rooms contained a well. Although the layout has remained the same since the tower's construction, the interior of the basement dates mostly from the 18th century when the floor was lowered and the pre-existing timber vaults were replaced with brick counterparts. The basement is lit through small slits. The sole access to the floor was via the north-east staircase turret.

The entrance floor was probably intended for the use of the Constable of the Tower and other important officials. The south entrance was blocked during the 17th century, and not reopened until 1973. Those heading to the upper floor had to pass through a smaller chamber to the east, also connected to the entrance floor. The crypt of St John's Chapel occupied the south-east corner and was accessible only from the eastern chamber. There is a recess in the north wall of the crypt; according to Geoffrey Parnell, Keeper of the Tower History at the Royal Armouries, "the windowless form and restricted access, suggest that it was designed as a strong-room for safekeeping of royal treasures and important documents".

The north floor contained a grand hall in the west and a residential chamber in the east – both originally open to the roof and surrounded by a gallery built into the wall – and St John's Chapel in the south-east. The top floor was added in the 15th century, along with the present roof. The absence of domestic amenities such as fireplaces suggest it was intended for use as storage rather than accommodation. In the 17th century lead cisterns were installed on top of the White Tower.

The White Tower has contained at least two armouries, historically. The Horse Armoury, located on the tower's north side and 150 ft (46 m) long and 33 ft (10 m) wide, was built in 1825. From its northeast corner, a wooden staircase ornamented with two carvings titled "Gin" and "Beer" ascended to Queen Elizabeth's Armoury. Gin and Beer represent the two most important alcoholic beverages of their time. They are believed to have originally been placed in the great hall at Palace of Placentia in Greenwich.

=== Whalesbourne ===
Whalesbourne was a notorious Tudor dungeon in the White Tower, a central keep in the Tower of London. It was described by Robert Hutchinson as "where sunlight never penetrated, perhaps part of the Coldharbour gate that once stood at the south-eastern corner of the White Tower, where rats supposedly tore flesh...from the arms and legs of prisoners during sleep."

=== St John's Chapel ===
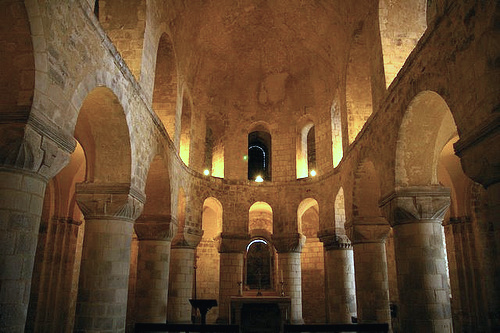
St John's Chapel, inside the White Tower

The semi-circular projection in the south-east corner to accommodate St John's Chapel is almost unparalleled in castle architecture. The only other keep in England with a similar projection is that of Colchester Castle in Essex, (Note: According to Allen Brown and P. Curnow "Technically in its plan ... and more especially in its apsidal projection at the south-east angle housing the chapel ... there is nothing else like it in Europe save only at Colchester".) the largest in England. St John's Chapel was not part of the White Tower's original design, as the apsidal projection was built after the basement walls. Due to changes in function and design since the tower's construction, except for the chapel little is left of the original interior. The chapel's current bare and unadorned appearance is reminiscent of how it would have been in the Norman period. In the 13th century, during Henry III's reign, the chapel was decorated with such ornamentation as a gold-painted cross, and stained glass windows that depicted the Virgin Mary and Holy Trinity.

== Bibliography ==
- Allen Brown, Reginald (1976) [1954], Allen Brown's English Castles, The Boydell Press, ISBN 1-84383-069-8
- Allen Brown, Reginald; Curnow, P (1984), Tower of London, Greater London: Department of the Environment Official Handbook, Her Majesty's Stationery Office, ISBN 0-11-671148-5
- Friar, Stephen (2003), The Sutton Companion to Castles, Sutton Publishing, ISBN 978-0-7509-3994-2* Horrox, Rosemary (2004). "Edward V (1470–1483), king of England and lord of Ireland". Oxford Dictionary of National Biography. Oxford Dictionary of National Biography (online ed.). Oxford University Press. doi:10.1093/ref:odnb/8521. (Subscription, Wikipedia Library access or UK public library membership required.) (subscription required)
- Impey, Edward; Parnell, Geoffrey (2000), The Tower of London: The Official Illustrated History, Merrell Publishers in association with Historic Royal Palaces, ISBN 1-85894-106-7
- Parnell, Geoffrey (1993), The Tower of London, Batsford, ISBN 978-0-7134-6864-9
- Gower, Ronald C. (1901). The Tower of London. George Bell & Sons.
- Poyser, Arthur (1908). The Tower of London. Wentworth Press.
