= Richard Elvet =

English priest

Richard Elvet was an English priest in the early 15th century.

Elvet was born in Durham and was in the service of John of Gaunt. He succeeded his brother John as Archdeacon of Leicester in 1404. In 1424 he exchanged the Archdeaconry with John Legbourne for the benefice of Sedgefield.

== See also ==
- Diocese of Lincoln
- Diocese of Peterborough
- Diocese of Leicester
- Archdeacon of Leicester
