= John Elvet =

English priest

John Elvet was an English priest in the late 14th and early 15th centuries.

== Life and career ==
Elvet was born in Durham and was in the service of John of Gaunt. The Master of the Jewel Office, he was Archdeacon of Leicester from 1392 to 1404. He was succeeded as Archdeacon by his brother Richard.

== See also ==
- Diocese of Lincoln
- Diocese of Peterborough
- Diocese of Leicester
- Archdeacon of Leicester
