= John Legbourne =

English priest

John Legbourne was an English priest in the early 15th century.

Legbourne was born in Durham and was an executor of John of Gaunt. He was Master of the Jewel Office from 1401 to 1403, In 1424 he exchanged the benefice of Sedgefield with Richard Elvet for the Archdeaconry of Leicester .

== See also ==
- Diocese of Lincoln
- Diocese of Peterborough
- Diocese of Leicester
- Archdeacon of Leicester
