= Edmund Lenthal Swifte =

British writer (1777–1875)

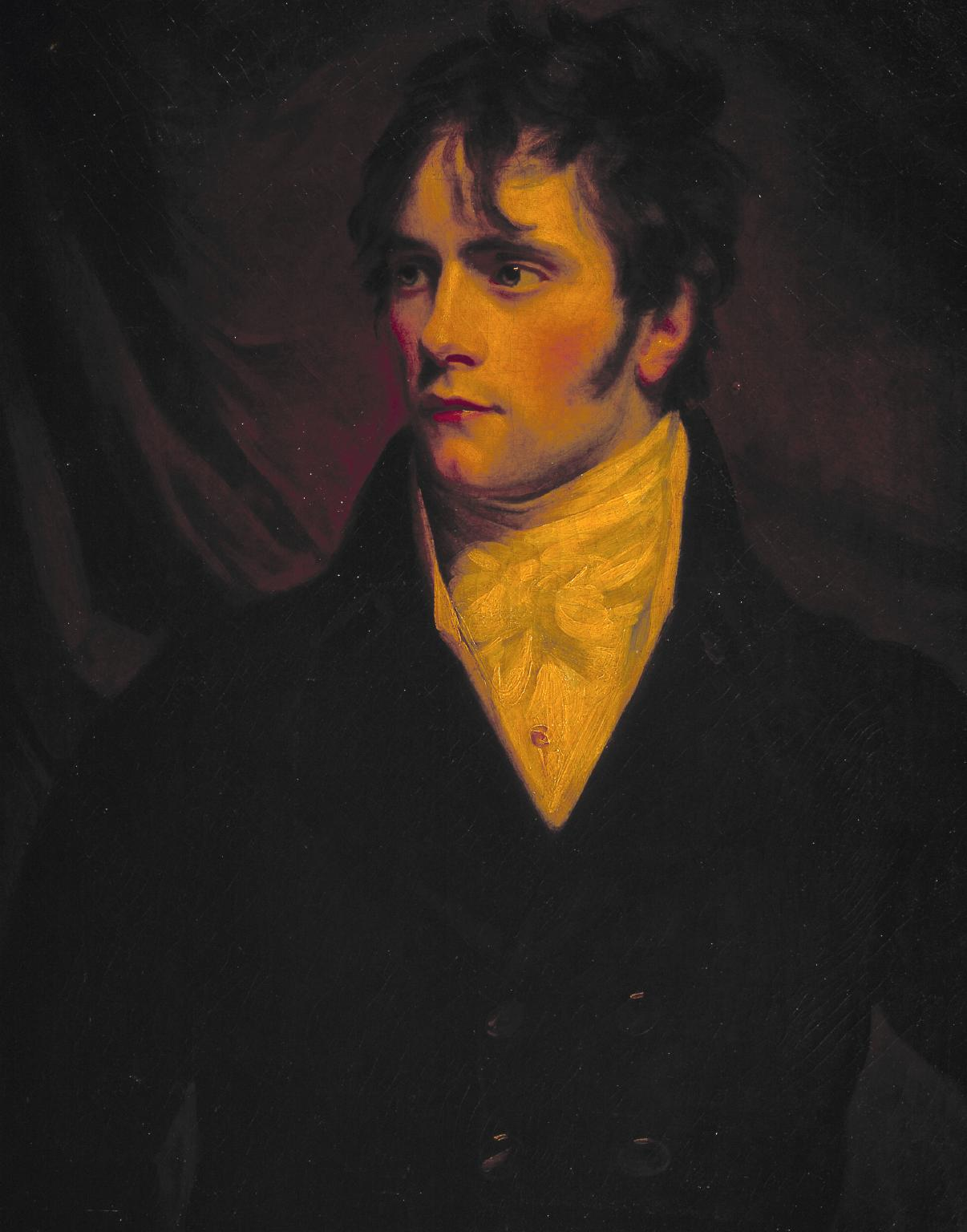
Edmund Lenthal Swifte

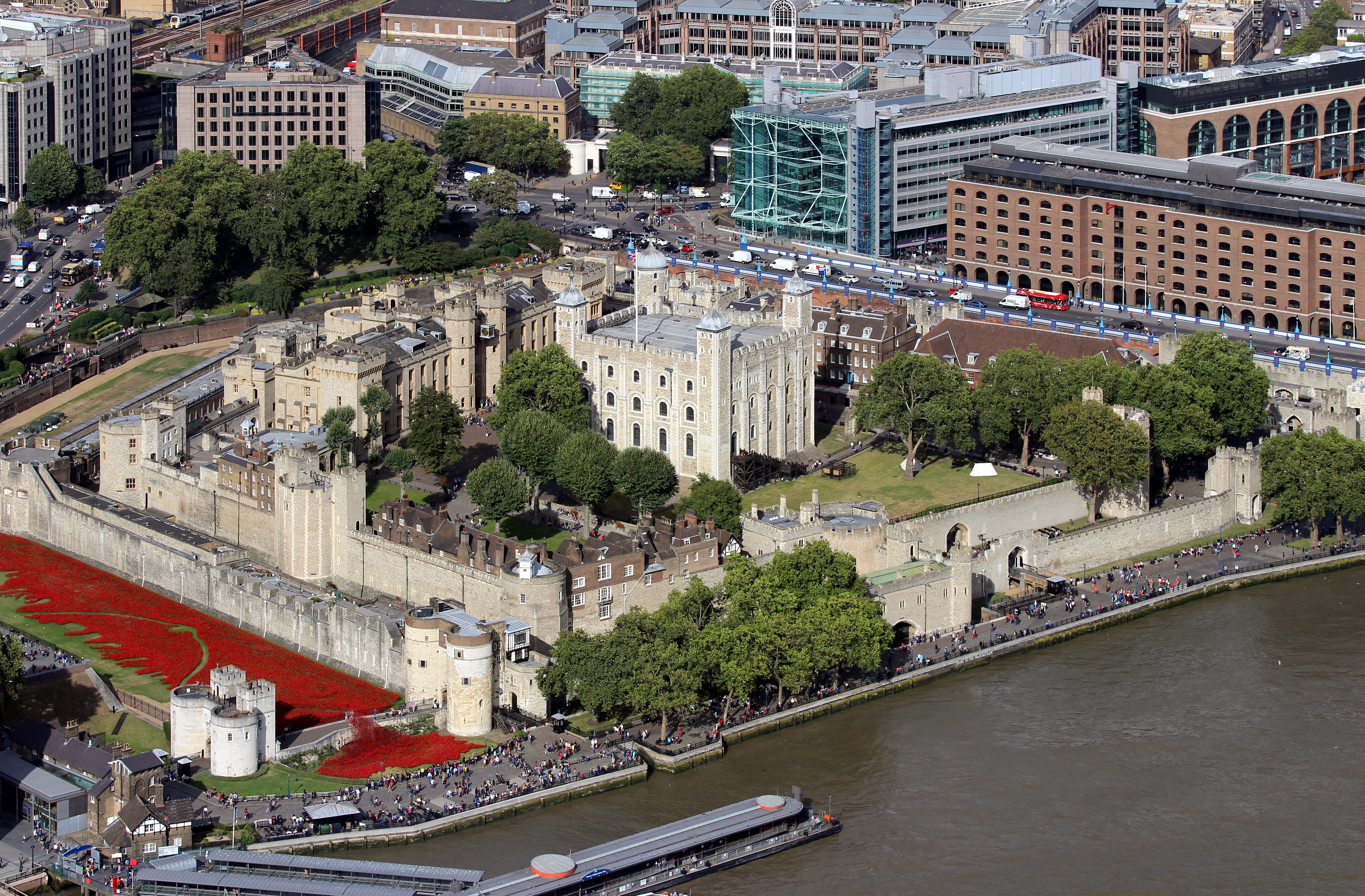
Tower of London

Edmund Lewis Lenthal Swifte or Swift (20 June 1777 – 28 December 1875) was a British lawyer, poet and writer who was for many years the custodian of the British Crown Jewels in the Tower of London.

He was born the younger son of Theophilus Swifte of Goodrich, Herefordshire (a relative of Jonathan Swift) and studied at Trinity College, Dublin. He was a member of the Lawyers' Corps in Ireland (1796–1803) and was called to the bar in Dublin in 1803. He was called to the bar in England in 1815.

In 1814 he was appointed Master of the Jewel Office in the Tower of London, a position he held until 1852. During his time there (in October, 1817) he claimed to have seen a ghostly apparition floating above his wife's head at dinner.

He produced a number of poems, translations and essays.

He died in Dover in 1875 at the age of 98. He had married several times and had many children.

== Works ==
- Life and acts of St. Patrick by Jocelin – translation, 1809
- Anacreon in Dublin – poetry, 1814
- Waterloo and other poems– 1815
- Juvenal's 10th and 13th Satires – translation, 1818.
- The equality of the constitution – essay, 1819.
- Woman's will — a riddle! An operatic drama – 1820.
- One thousand eight hundred and twenty nine, or, shall it be so? – 1829.
- Homeric studies – 1840.
