= Master of the Jewel Office =

Position in the Royal Households of England

The Master of the Jewel Office was a position in the Royal Households of England, the Kingdom of Great Britain and the United Kingdom. The office holder was responsible for running the Jewel House, which houses the Crown Jewels. This role has, at various points in history, been called Master or Treasurer of the Jewel House, Master or Keeper of the Crown Jewels, Master or Keeper of the Regalia, and Keeper of the Jewel House. In 1967, the role was combined with Resident Governor of the Tower of London.

== Incumbents ==
- 1042: Abbot and monks of Westminster Abbey
- 1216: First official Keeper of the Regalia appointed by Henry III
- 1230: Bishop of Carlisle
- 1337: John de Flete
- 1347: Robert de Mildenhall
- 1378–84: John Bacon
- 1382: John of Salisbury (probably Clerk)
- 1384: Sir John Beauchamp
- 1387: Sir John Golafre
- 1387: Lambert Fernier
- 1391: Guy Mone
- 1398: John Lowick of Luftwyke
- 1399: John Elvet
- 1401: John Legbourne
- 1403: William Pilton
- 1407: Simon Flete
- 1408–13: Thomas Ryngewood
- 1415: Richard Courtenay, Bishop of Norwich
- 1417: Thomas Chitterne
- 1421: Nicholas Merbury
- 1422: Thomas Rokes
- 1424: John Merston
- 1453: Richard Merston
- 1458–60: William Grymesby
- 1462: William Porthe
- 1465: Sir Thomas Vaughan
- 1483: Edmund Chaderton
- 1485–90: Sir William Tyler
- 1486: Sir Henry Wyatt
- 1524: Robert Amadas
- 1532: Thomas Cromwell
- 1536: Sir John Williams
- 1544: Sir Anthony Rous
- 1545: Sir Anthony Aucher
- 1554: Richard Wilbraham
- 1557: Sir Francis Jobson
- 1558: John Astley
- 1595: Sir Edward Cary
- 1603: Sir Henry Cary
- 1618: Sir Henry Mildmay
- 1643: Sir Robert Howard (at Oxford)
- 1651: office vacant upon death of Sir Robert Howard in the English Civil War
- - hiatus -
- 1660: (June) Sir Gilbert Talbot - appointed at the restoration of the monarchy under Charles II
- 1665: Talbot Edwards
- 1674: Wythe Edwards
- 1676: Sir Martin Beckman
- 1690: Sir Francis Lawley, 2nd Baronet
- 1697: Heneage Montagu
- 1698: Colonel Charles Godfrey
- 1702: Talbot Edwards (Jnr)
- 1704: John Charlton
- 1711: Heneage Finch
- 1716: James Brudenell
- 1719: Thomas Rowley
- 1730: Charles Townshend
- 1736: Hugh Heny
- 1739: William Neville
- 1744: Henry Pelham-Clinton
- 1748: John Campbell
- 1758: Sir Richard Lyttelton
- 1763: Henry Vane
- 1768: George Hoare
- 1782: office closed and duties transferred to the Lord Chamberlain.
- - hiatus -
- 1814: Edmund L. Swifte - office revived in the 19th century.
- 1852: Lieut.-Colonel Charles Wyndham
- 1872: Colonel John Cox Gawler
- 1882: Lieut.-General George Dean-Pitt
- 1883: Captain Arthur John Loftus
- 1891: Lieut.-General Sir Michael Biddulph
- 1896: Lieut.-General Sir Frederick Middleton
- 1898: General Sir Hugh Gough
- 1909: General Sir Robert Lowe
- 1911: General Sir Arthur Wynne
- 1917–44: Major-General Sir George Younghusband (after his death in 1944, the post was vacant for eight years)
- 1952–67: Major-General Hervey Degge Wilmot Sitwell

For subsequent appointments see Resident Governor of the Tower of London and Keeper of the Jewel House
