= Furnace, Argyll =

Village in Scotland

Coordinates: 56.153288°N 5.1817760°W

Furnace: Scottish Gaelic: An Fhùirneis
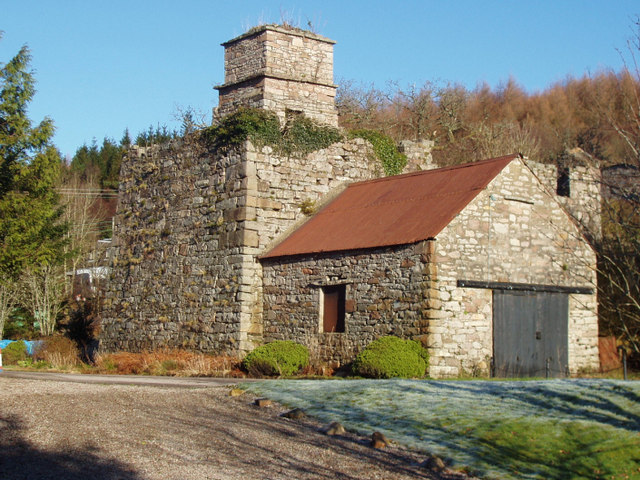
- The old iron furnace

- Location within Argyll and Bute
- OS grid reference: NN 02477 00182
- Council area: Argyll and Bute
- Lieutenancy area: Argyll and Bute
- Country: Scotland
- Sovereign state: United Kingdom
- Post town: INVERARAY
- Postcode district: PA32
- Dialling code: 01499
- UK Parliament: Argyll, Bute and South Lochaber
- Scottish Parliament: Argyll and Bute

Furnace ( Scottish Gaelic: An Fhùirneis) (formerly Inverleacainn ( Scottish Gaelic: Inbhir Leacainn)) is a village in Argyll and Bute, on the west coast of Scotland, on the north shore of Loch Fyne, the longest sea loch in the United Kingdom. Furnace is around eight miles southwest of Inveraray on the A83 road.

It is unusual for a West Highland village in having an industrial past in addition to the usual focus on agriculture and fishing. Industrial activity was led by three main businesses: the iron furnace, the powdermills and the quarry. Furnace and its population today are very different from what they were in its industrial heyday. From a village with 200 working stone-cutters alone, Furnace in 2008 has a total population of little over 200, many retired or semi-retired.

== History ==
=== Ironworks ===
The ironworks were founded in 1755 by the Duddon Company of Cumbria, drawn by the local forest capable of supplying the charcoal needed in smelting iron. The village, then called Inverleacainn (the mouth of the River Leacainn) gradually took on the shorthand name of ‘the furnace’ and finally, simply ‘Furnace’. The furnace itself shut down in 1812, upon the expiry of a 57-year lease from the Duke of Argyll. The Duddon Company was bought by Harrison Ainslie in 1828. The site is a scheduled monument

=== Loch Fyne Powderworks ===
The same charcoal resource that fed the furnace supported the development of the next industry to arrive - the manufacture of gunpowder using charcoal, sulphur and saltpetre. The Loch Fyne Powderworks, one of four in Argyll, was built in 1841 and was criticised for its safety standards after the Explosives Act 1875. The company had sited an 80-ton storage magazine 80 metres from the village school. 1883 saw the end of ‘The Powdermills’ when it blew up with a stove-house explosion. The only casualty was the manager, William Robinson, who was not even on site at the time but at home for lunch 230 metres away and killed by flying rocks. The explosion was the subject of a Government enquiry, with concerns (which were never substantiated) about industrial sabotage by rival firms.

=== Quarry ===
The quarry, opened in 1841 during the term of the Powdermills and still in operation today. It supplied cobbles for the streets of Glasgow and was the biggest employer in the area. Over 200 men then cut the pink granite by hand. The quarry, which now produces crushed stone and concrete in volume, is now fully mechanised, and employs 3-4 men.

== Economy ==
A significant source of work is fish farming, which employs eight people at the Furnace Hatchery.

Of seven local shops a single one remains, along with The Furnace Inn and a post office.

To the north of Furnace and south of Eredine is the Eredine Wind energy farm development.

== Education ==
There is a primary school in the village. The school had a roll of 40 in the 1930s, now has 24 pupils.

== Community ==
The village has a health centre and a visiting dentist, a sports pitch, and a children's play park.

The Leacainn Walk, a 6-mile circular walk from the village following some of the old drover’s roads, crosses the River Leacainn and passes many local landmarks. The villagers created the walk as millennium project.

=== Furnace and the Camanachd Cup ===
In the national sport of shinty, Furnace holds a record that cannot be beaten and was not equalled until 2013. In 1923, the Furnace team won the premier national competition, the Camanachd Cup, beating Newtonmore 2–0 at Inverness – and without having dropped a single goal from the start of the competition to their ultimate victory. Newtonmore equalled this feat in 2013 when they won the Camanachd Cup without conceding a goal.

== Notable residents ==
The Gaelic poet Evan MacColl was born in 1808 at Kenmore, a township on the northern fringe of Furnace. McColl, who wrote "The Mountain Minstrel" (Gaelic "Clarsach nam Beann), died at the end of the 19th century. A stone cairn was erected in his memory at Kenmore, on the rocks above the loch and was unveiled in 1930 by the Duke of Argyll.

The Tower of London’s first female Beefeater, Moira Cameron, appointed in 2007, is from Furnace, living above the village at Goatfield.
