= Ravens of the Tower of London =

Six birds in the historic castle

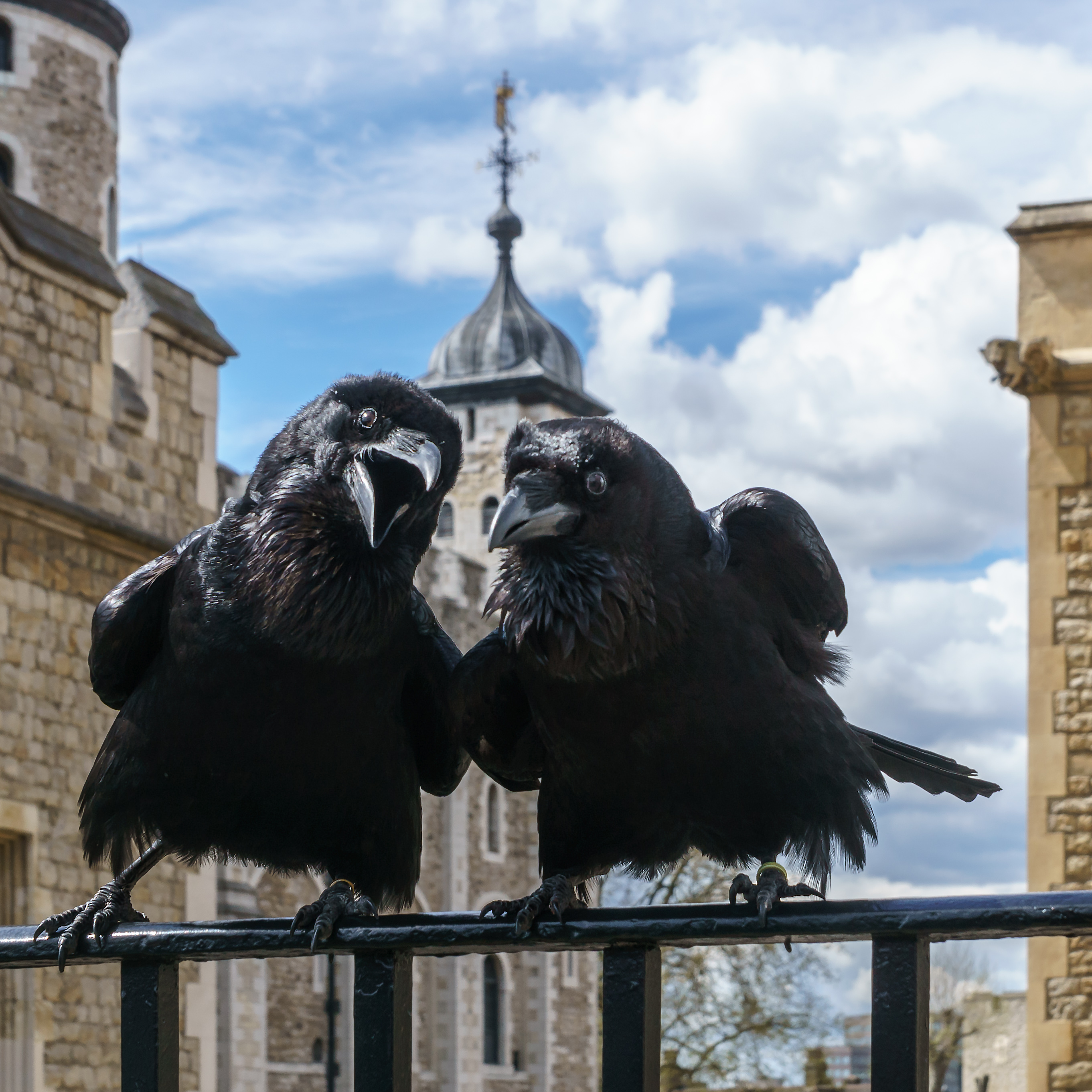
Jubilee and Munin, two of the Tower's ravens in 2016

The ravens of the Tower of London are a group (Note: A group of ravens is sometimes called an "unkindness" or a "conspiracy".) of at least six captive ravens (eight in 2025) resident at the Tower of London. Their presence is traditionally believed to protect the Crown and the Tower; a belief holds that "if the Tower of London ravens are lost or fly away, the Crown will fall and Britain with it." Local legend puts the origin of the captive raven population at the time of King Charles II (reigned 1660–1685). Some historians however, including the Tower's official historian, believe the "Tower's raven mythology is likely to be a Victorian flight of fantasy". The earliest known reference to captive ravens at the Tower is an illustration from 1883.

Historically, wild ravens were common throughout Britain, even in towns; the Tower was within their natural range. When they were eliminated from much of their traditional range, including London, they could only exist at the Tower in captivity and with official support. The Tower ravens are tended to every day by the Ravenmaster of the Yeomen Warders heading a team of Yeoman Warders known as Ravenmaster's assistants. Some of the ravens at the Tower were specially bred in Somerset.

== History ==
=== Origins of the legend ===
The earliest legend that connects the Tower with a raven is the euhemerised Welsh tale of the war against the Irish leader Matholwch who had mistreated the princess Branwen. Branwen's brother Brân the Blessed (King of the Britons) ordered his followers to cut off his head and bury it beneath the "White Hill" (upon which the Tower now stands) facing out towards France as a talisman to protect Britain from foreign invasion.

Brân is the modern Welsh word for raven and the magical and protective qualities of ravens are attested throughout Celtic mythology. The knowledge that Brân's head was buried beneath the White Hill would have served as protective reassurance in the Celtic tradition, just as modern ideas about the presence of ravens does. As such, it is likely to have its origins in British folklore.

=== Later legends ===
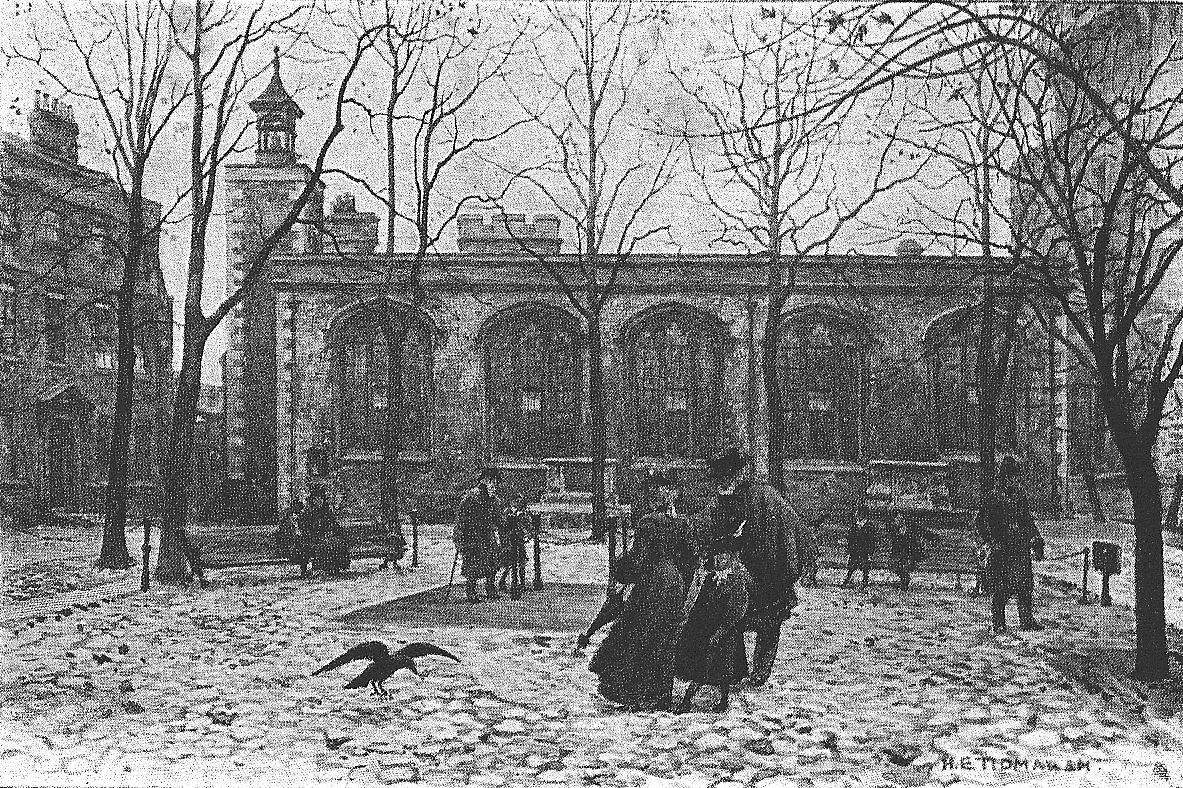
A view (c. 1900) of Tower Green, where historically a temporary scaffold was sometimes erected for executions, although these were usually carried out on Tower Hill outside the castle. Before the 20th century, there were seven executions on Tower Green.

Sir George John Younghusband wrote that at the execution of Anne Boleyn in 1536, "Even the ravens of the Tower sat silent and immovable on the battlements and gazed eerily at the strange scene. A Queen about to die!" According to American author Boria Sax, the ravens of the Tower behaved much worse during the execution of Lady Jane Grey: in 1554, "pecking the eyes from the severed head" of the queen.

In his article "How Ravens Came to the Tower of London", Boria Sax came to the conclusion that "the ravens were originally brought in to dramatise the alleged site of executions at the Tower".

One legend attributes the start of the tradition of keeping ravens with clipped wings in the Tower of London to Charles II and to his royal astronomer John Flamsteed, although there are versions of the legend that differ in their details. According to one legend, John Flamsteed complained to Charles II that wild ravens were flying past his telescope and making it harder for him to observe the sky from his observatory in the White Tower. Flamsteed requested that the birds be removed, but Charles II refused to comply with this request.

Another variation of this legend says that it was Charles II himself who disliked the wild ravens' droppings falling onto the telescope. The conversation with his astronomer that supposedly followed decided the fate not only of the ravens, but also of Greenwich, where the Greenwich Observatory was commissioned by the King in 1675. In this version of the legend the King complained:

"These ravens must go!" he said. "But, Sire, it is very unlucky to kill a raven," replied Flamstead, "If you do that the Tower will fall and you will lose your kingdom, having only just got it back!" Charles, being a pragmatist, thought for a moment and said: "The Observatory must go to Greenwich and the ravens can stay in the Tower."

Yet another legend attributes the appearance of ravens in the Tower to the Great Fire of London in 1666. Wild ravens, as well as pigs and kites, were the biggest scavengers in medieval London. Allegedly after the fire, survivors started persecuting ravens for scavenging, but Flamsteed explained to Charles II that killing all ravens would be a bad omen, and that the kingdom would not outlive the last killed raven. Charles II then ordered six birds to be kept at the Tower.

=== Wild ravens in London ===
Ravens are native to Britain (and most other parts of the Northern Hemisphere), although in recent times breeding populations are mostly restricted to the wilder western upland areas of the British Isles. Ravens were common in London and other urban areas across Britain for centuries, because until the 16th century, they lived in close proximity to people as well as in wild areas; ravens were welcomed in towns because their scavenging habits of feeding helped keep the streets clean. However, in later years wild ravens were viewed as a threat to livestock, and during the 19th century they were eliminated in many urban areas by systematic hunting and shooting. The last time ravens nested in the wild in London was in Hyde Park in 1826, but the Royal Society for the Protection of Birds reported in 2004 that ravens had been observed nesting in the Home Counties around London, as close as 30 miles (48 km) from the Tower.

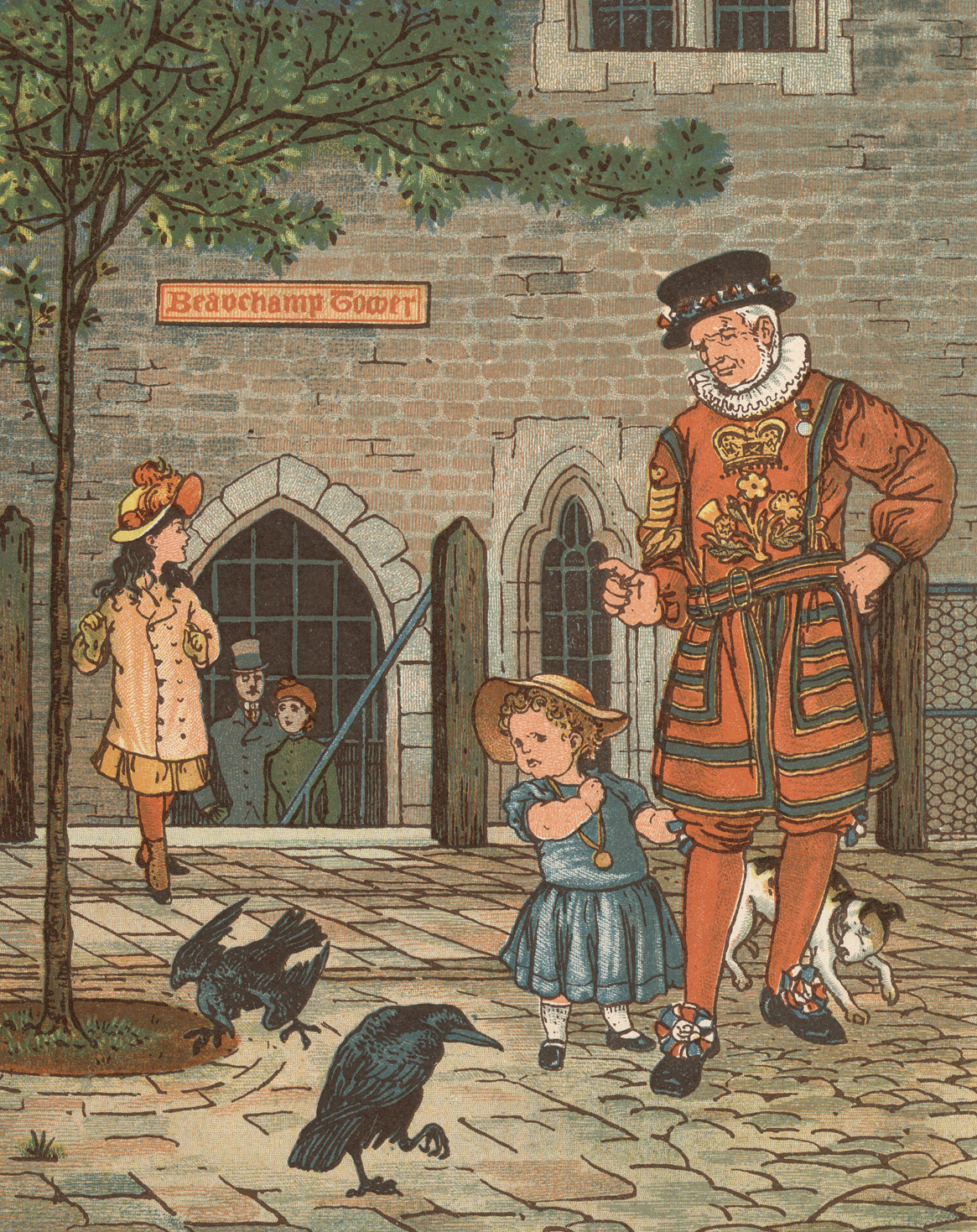
Ravens in the Tower of London, from London Town (1883)

The first two known depictions of ravens in the Tower of London both date from the year 1883. One is in a special edition of the newspaper The Pictorial World and the other is from the children's Book London Town, written by Felix Leigh and illustrated by Thomas Crane and Elizabeth Houghton.

Sax found the one early mention of importation of captive ravens in the 1918 book The Tower from Within by George Younghusband. Younghusband stated that the ravens were provided by the 4th Earl of Dunraven (1841–1926). The second Earl of Dunraven had been a patron of the druidic scholar, poet, and forger Iolo Morganwg, who convinced the family that their castle in Glamorgan had been the original residence of the raven-god Bran, actually an early king. The Earls may have thought of the ravens as avatars of Bran, and wished to assert a spiritual claim over the Tower.

Geoffrey Parnell, the official Tower of London historian and a member of the Royal Armouries staff, considers the purported ancient history of captive ravens at the Tower to instead be a legend invented during the Victorian era. During Parnell's research, despite the superstition that the Crown depends on the continued presence of the ravens, "[he] has found the blunt statement in the records 'there are none left' – and yet the monarchy and the tower have more or less survived". This alludes to a period right before the reopening of the Tower after World War II, when the only surviving ravens, the mated pair Mabel and Grip, (Note: Three of the Ravens of the Tower of London have been named after Grip, a raven kept as a pet by Charles Dickens.) disappeared from the Tower, perhaps eloping to a nearby wood. The story of their escape appeared in several local American papers.

Parnell has stated that the first captive ravens may have been introduced to the Tower as pets of the staff. After Edgar Allan Poe's "The Raven", a narrative poem inspired by the talking raven in Charles Dickens's Barnaby Rudge, was first published in January 1845, the Western world became fascinated with the birds.

Japanese novelist and scholar Natsume Sōseki visited the Tower in 1900. He wrote an account published in 1906 reporting a total of six ravens at the Tower as a central focus during and following an execution at the site. It was noted, however, that Sōseki's writing style "blends fantasy, history, and present experience".

=== World War II ===
The first reference to an early version of the legend that Britain will fall if the ravens leave the Tower comes from July 1944, when ravens were used as unofficial spotters for enemy bombs and planes during the Blitz of World War II. During the Blitz, all but three of the ravens died from either bombing or stress; the survivors were Gripp, his mate Mabel and another raven named Pauline. Mabel and Gripp soon "disappeared", however.

After this, Winston Churchill, then prime minister, ordered more ravens to bring the flock back to the correct size. The Tower ravens are enlisted as soldiers of the Kingdom and were issued attestation cards in the same way as soldiers and police. As with soldiers, they can be dismissed for conduct prejudicial to good order and discipline.

=== Subsequent events ===
Today the Tower's ravens are one of the attractions for tourists visiting the City of London. However, visitors are advised not to feed the birds and warned that a raven will bite if it feels threatened.

Since 1987, the Tower ravens have been the subject of a successful captive breeding programme. For example, over time, 17 chicks were successfully hatched and raised by a pair of ravens known as Charlie and Rhys.

In 1995, raven Charlie startled a bomb-sniffing dog, and the dog grabbed the raven with his mouth. According to a police spokesman, "the bird probably died of shock".

While visiting the Tower in 2003, Vladimir Putin, the President of Russia, is reported to have been taken aback by the verbal skills of one of the birds; Thor greeted each person in his entourage with a "Good morning!".

During the global spread of H5N1 virus ("bird flu") in 2006, the ravens of the Tower were taken inside and lived in "custom-built aviaries".

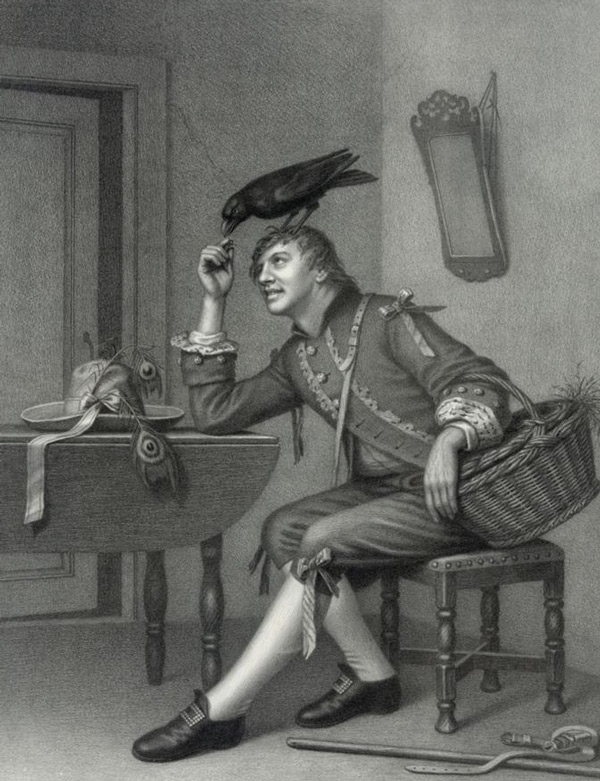
Barnaby Rudge with Grip perched on his head, from Dickens's Barnaby Rudge (1841). In 2012, marking the bicentenary of Dickens’s birth, and the Diamond Jubilee of Queen Elizabeth II, the Tower's two new ravens were named Grip and Jubilee.

Raven Jubilee was presented to the Queen to mark the Diamond Jubilee in 2012, and later released in the Tower, bringing the total number to eight. Throughout history, three of the Tower's ravens have been named after Charles Dickens's talking pet raven Grip (the basis for a character of the same name in his 1841 novel Barnaby Rudge), the latest in 2012.

In May 2013, two Tower ravens were killed by a red fox that managed to infiltrate the grounds, the only fox attack inside the walls ever recorded. This reduced the raven population to the minimum number of six. Upgraded security measures were included in the plans for a major refurbishment of the raven accommodations, funded by the independent Historic Royal Palaces organisation.

Appointed in 2011, former Ravenmaster Christopher Skaife was caring for seven of the birds in 2018. He reduced the amount of clipping of the wings and feathers by a third to allow the ravens to fly, instead of merely hopping or gliding. He allowed one of the birds, Merlina, to fly to the wharf on the Thames, but she always returned due to her bonding with her keeper. During Skaife's tenure, only one raven, Muninn, escaped, but was captured by a member of the public.

On Saint George's Day (23 April) 2019, four chicks were hatched from ravens Huginn and Muninn (named after Odin's mythical ravens), the first to do so at the Tower since 1989. One of the chicks remains at the Tower and has been named Georgie, in reference to the date the hatching began.

On 31 January 2021, the Tower of London announced that Merlina, known as "Queen of the Tower Ravens", had not been seen at the Tower grounds for several weeks, leading the Ravenmaster to believe she has died. A statement released on Twitter reads:

We now have 7 ravens here at the Tower – one more than the required 6, so we don't have any immediate plans to fill Merlina's vacancy. However in time we hope that a new chick from our breeding programme will be up to the formidable challenge of continuing her legacy.

In March 2021, it was announced that two raven chicks were born to the Tower's breeding pair, Huginn and Muninn. The male of the pair was given the name 'Edgar' after Edgar Allan Poe. A public vote was announced to decide on the name of the female in the pair in time for the reopening of the Tower to the public on 19 May 2021. The names available to vote on include Matilda, Branwen, Brontë, Winifred and Florence. The winner was Branwen.

In March 2024, Skaife retired as the Ravenmaster and he was succeeded by Barney Chandler as the new Ravenmaster.

in May 2025, two raven chicks, Henry and Poe, joined the current ravens, Harris, Poppy, Georgie, Edgar, Chaos, and Jubilee, at the Tower. Henry is named after various royal Henrys, and Poe is named after the author of "The Raven".

== Care and diet ==
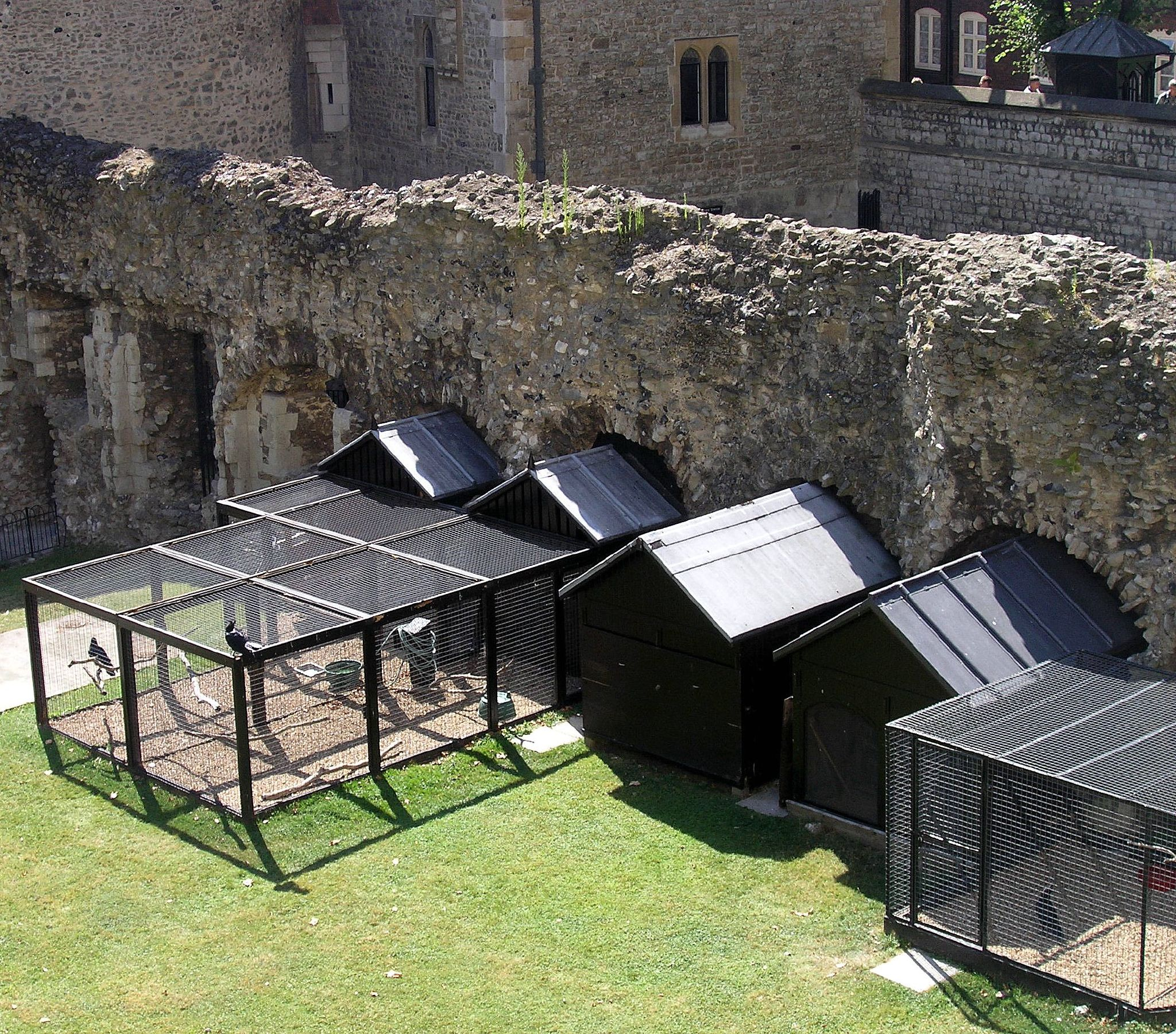
The ravens' aviary in 2004

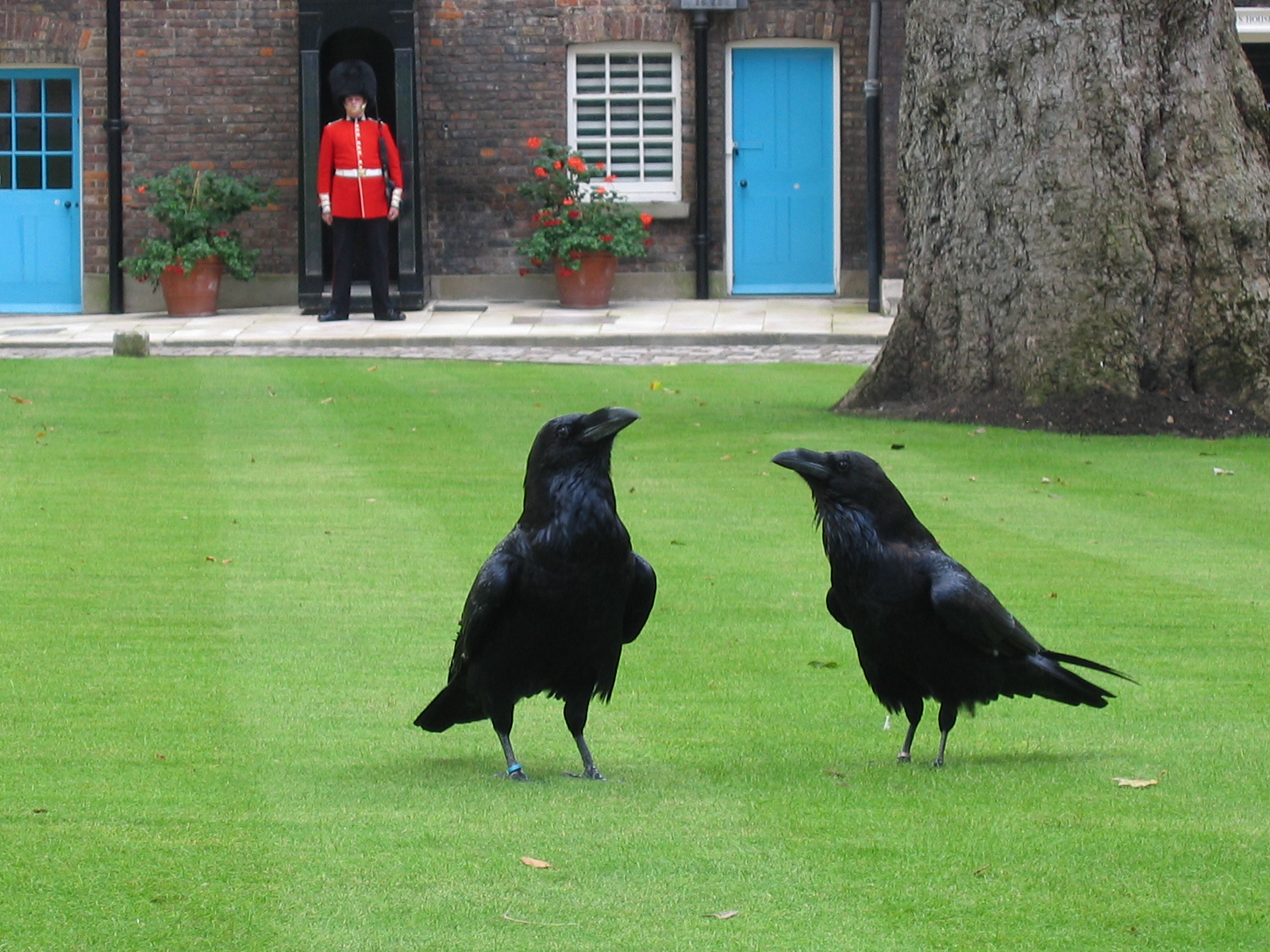
Ravens on the Tower lawn with a Scots Guard at his sentry box

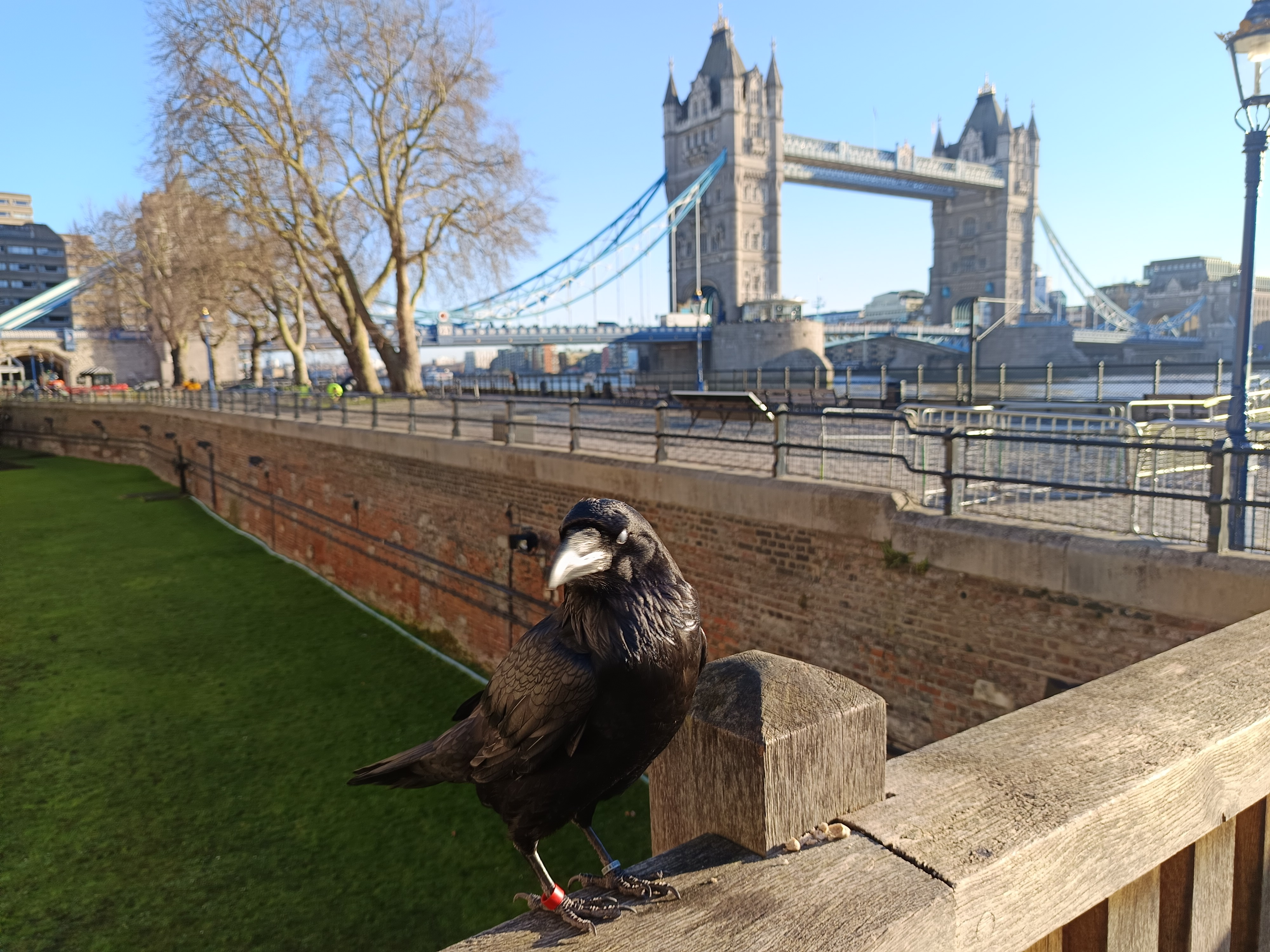
Raven Poppy (with a red band to identify her) on the Tower's outer walls with Tower Bridge in the background

The ravens cannot fly far because the flight feathers on one wing are clipped. With a single wing clipped, they can only fly short distances to perch. Otherwise, as Boria Sax writes, tongue-in-cheek:

The ravens are now treated almost like royalty. Like the Royals, the ravens live in a palace and are waited on by servants. They are kept at public expense, but in return they must show themselves to the public in settings of great splendour. So long as they abide by certain basic rules, neither Royals nor ravens have to do anything extraordinary. If the power in question is political and diplomatic, the Royals now have hardly more than the ravens. But the word "power" here can also mean the aura of glamour and mystery which at times envelops both ravens and monarchs.

Each Tower raven has a different coloured band on one leg, to make it easier to identify individual birds. Ravens in captivity in the Tower grounds have had lifespans of more than 40 years.

The Tower's ravens are given individual names, and are all under the care of the Yeomen Warders. The diet of the ravens is carefully maintained. Their diet consists of raw meat daily, usually liver, lambs' hearts and beef or pork trimming, and every other day includes boiled egg with shell and blood-soaked bird biscuits. Occasionally, rabbit parts with fur are added for roughage. Once a week the birds are given a thorough check-over, and once every third week the lifting feathers on their right wings are trimmed to prevent them from flying away.

== Raven stories ==
Londoners tend to be fond of the ravens, but sometimes an individual bird will fall out of favour because of inappropriate behaviour. For example, "Raven George" lost his appointment to the Crown, and was retired to Wales for attacking and destroying TV aerials. A special decree was issued about the incident:

On Saturday 13th September 1986, Raven George, enlisted 1975, was posted to the Welsh Mountain Zoo. Conduct unsatisfactory, service therefore no longer required.

In 1996, two more ravens fell out of favour and were dismissed from the Tower for "conduct unbecoming Tower residents."

Despite having their flight feathers clipped on one wing, sometimes the Tower ravens desert their duties. In 1981, Grog the raven decided to leave the surroundings of the Tower for those of a pub, after 21 years of faithful service to the Crown. In contrast, a raven named Mabel was kidnapped from the Tower soon after World War II, a mystery that has never been solved.

Another story concerns the two ravens named "James Crow" and "Edgar Sopper". James Crow, who was a much-loved and long-lived raven, had died. After noticing the commotion surrounding the other raven's death, Edgar Sopper decided he could "play dead" in order to bring more attention to himself. His trick was so convincing that the ravenmaster fully believed that Edgar Sopper had died. When the ravenmaster picked up the "corpse", Edgar bit the man's finger and "flapped off croaking huge raven laughs". Likewise, "Merlin" has since been known for eliciting a commotion from visitors by occasionally playing dead.

In 1990, a chaplain named Norman Hood died in his chamber on the Tower grounds. Former Assistant Ravenmaster Tom Trent has reported that the ravens appeared to be aware of the death, for they soon gathered on the Tower Green near the chapel, called out, and then became quiet, as though to pay their respects. Corvids have been widely reported to hold "funerals", in which they mourn and then cluster around a dead bird in silence.
