= Christopher Skaife =

Yeoman Warder Ravenmaster

Christopher Skaife RVM
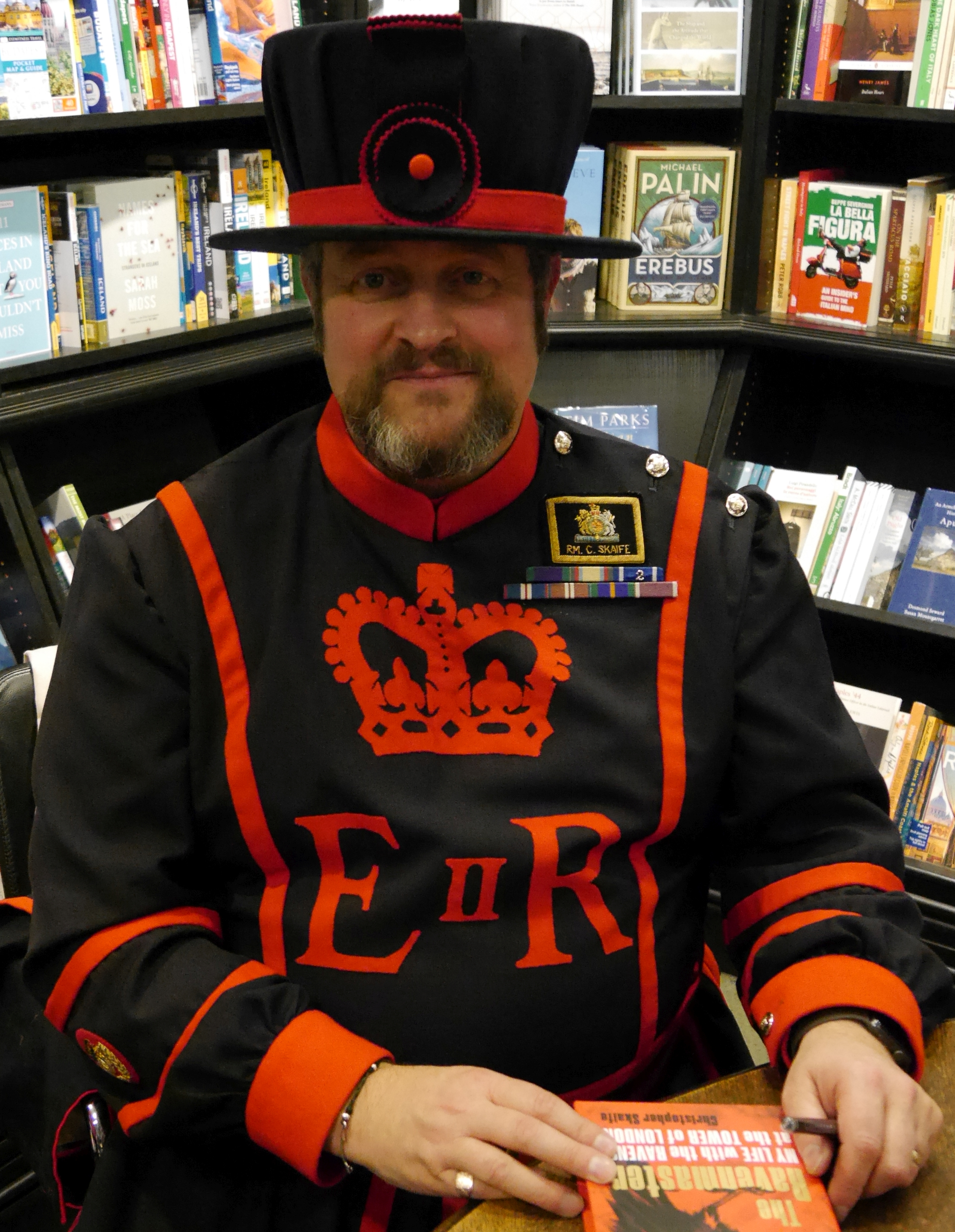
- Skaife at Hatchards in London in 2018
- Born: 18 December 1965 (age 60); Dover, England
- Title: Yeoman Warder Ravenmaster (2011–2024)
- Military career
- Service: British Army
- Service years: 1982 – c. 2006
- Rank: Colour sergeant
- Unit: Princess of Wales's Royal Regiment
- Conflicts: The Troubles; Gulf War
- Awards: Royal Victorian Medal

Christopher James Skaife RVM (born 18 December 1965) is a Yeoman Warder at the Tower of London. He was previously the Ravenmaster and his responsibilities included the care and feeding for the ravens of the Tower of London.

Skaife was born in Dover on 18 December 1965 and joined the British Army at the age of 18. Skaife is a retired colour sergeant and a former drum major with the Princess of Wales's Royal Regiment.

In 2011, Skaife succeeded Derrick Coyle as Ravenmaster at the Tower of London, where he was responsible for seven ravens. In 2018, he published The Ravenmaster, which The Guardian called "a wonderfully personal account of life with the ravens". In March 2024, he retired as Ravenmaster after 14 years and was replaced by Company Sergeant Major Barney Chandler, a former Royal Marine.

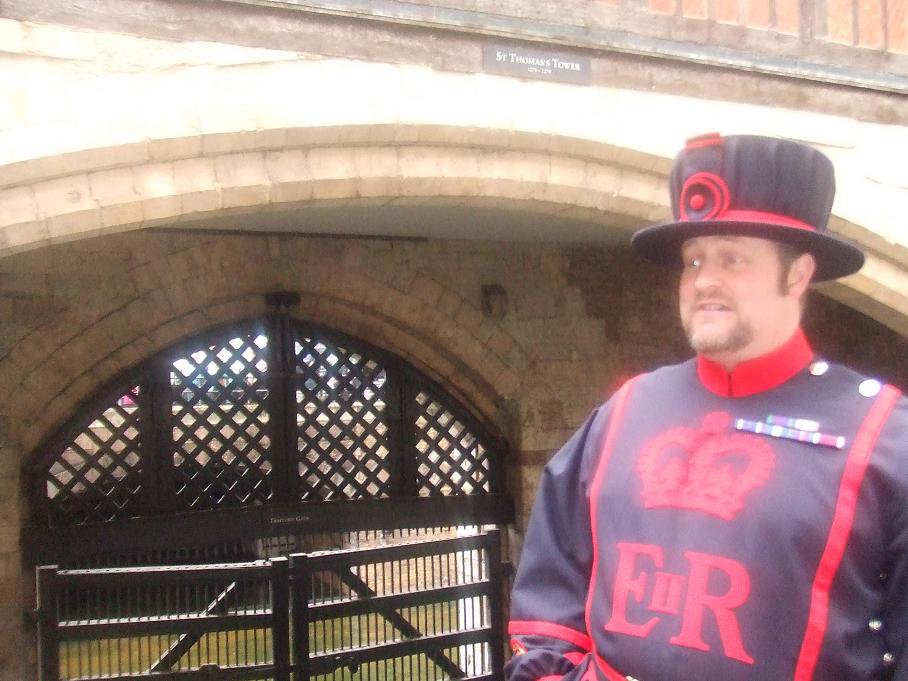
Skaife in front of the Traitors' Gate

He was awarded the Royal Victorian Medal, Silver (RVM) in the 2026 Birthday Honours for public service.

== Publications ==
- The Ravenmaster. 2018. ISBN 978-0-374-11334-6.
