= Byward Tower =

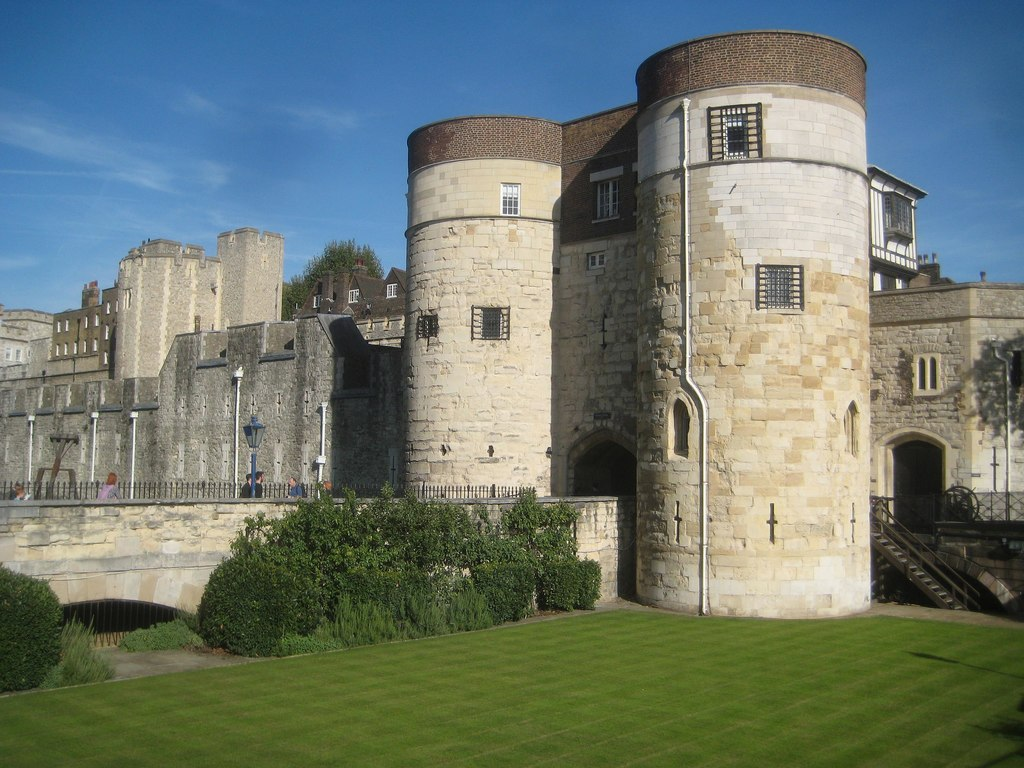
Byward Tower

Byward Tower is a barbican (defensive gatehouse) of the Tower of London.

Byward Tower was built in the 13th century by Henry III, on the inward bank of the moat. It consists of two towers connected by an upper arcade, under which persons wishing to visit (or storm) the Tower of London from the southwest would pass. Standing on the inner shore of the moat, it guards that end of a causeway over the moat (the outer end is guarded by the nearly contemporaneous Middle Tower).

Byward Tower was built to defend the southwestern entrance to the Tower of London, and to do so it has a drawbridge, arrow loops, and two portcullises above which are some murder holes (small shafts for pouring boiling oil or other unpleasant substances down upon an enemy attempting to break through the gate).

The Tower was originally named Bywarden Tower, on account of being located by the Wardens – that is, next to the Guards quarters. Until the 18th century, the Byward Tower underwent various minor defensive upgrades. The winding mechanism for the portcullis is a replacement, installed around 1675.

The Ceremony of the Keys, marking the locking of the Tower of London at night (now merely symbolic) which has been carried out for centuries, begins with the Chief Yeoman Warder of the Tower emerging from Bywater Tower, carrying a lantern and the King's Keys.

Although modern tourists pass under the arcade to enter the Tower of London, Bywater Tower is not now open to visitors. In one room, which formerly housed the London Mint, is the Byward Angel, a wall painting from the 1390s depicting the Crucifixion, the last remaining artwork of its kind in the Tower of London – but it is mostly obscured by a fireplace built over it later, and disfigured with a Tudor rose.

In the entranceway, one stone of the north tower is replaced by a cloudy glass window, through which one can dimly see the "Byward hand", a sculpted human hand. The provenance, age, and reason for the hand, and whether or not it is a bit of a joke, is either not known or not told by the Yeoman Warders.

Richard II is supposed to have sought sanctuary in the Byward Tower during Wat Tyler's Revolt of 1381.
