= Moira Cameron =

Yeoman Warder of the Tower of London

Yeoman Warder Cameron
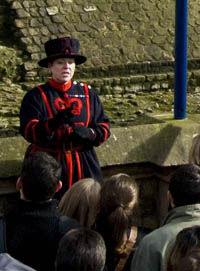
- Moira Cameron in everyday blue Yeoman Warder uniform at the Tower of London
- Born: 1964 (age 61–62); Furnace, Argyll, Scotland
- Occupation: Yeoman Warder of the Tower of London
- Known for: Being the first ever female Yeoman Warder (a.k.a. Beefeaters)
- Military career
- Service: British Army
- Service years: 1985–2007
- Rank: Warrant Officer Class 2

Moira Cameron (born 1964) is a retired Yeoman Warder of the Tower of London, United Kingdom. She is the first woman to ever hold the position. In 2007, after a 22-year career in the British Army, Cameron became one of the 35 resident Warders in the Tower of London, commonly known as the Beefeaters.

Originally prison guards, the Yeoman Warder's position dates back to 1485. It is now a largely ceremonial role, with responsibility for conducting guided tours and generally looking after public visitors to the Tower, as well as conducting certain other duties both inside and outside the Tower.

== Career ==
=== British Army ===
Cameron joined the Women's Royal Army Corps (WRAC) in June 1985 at the age of 20. She was trained as a Data Telegraphist with the Royal Corps of Signals before transferring to the Royal Army Pay Corps (RAPC) in 1988 to train as a Military Accountant, and in 2000 Cameron was awarded her Long Service and Good Conduct Medal. In 1992, WRAC and RAPC were replaced by the Adjutant General's Corps, and Cameron worked her way through the ranks in its Staff and Personnel Support Branch, completing 22 years service in the army in June 2007. Having seen service in England, Northern Ireland and Cyprus, Cameron ended her Army career at the rank of Warrant Officer Class 2, holding the post of Superintendent Clerk in 145 (Home Counties) Brigade in Aldershot.

=== Yeoman Warder ===
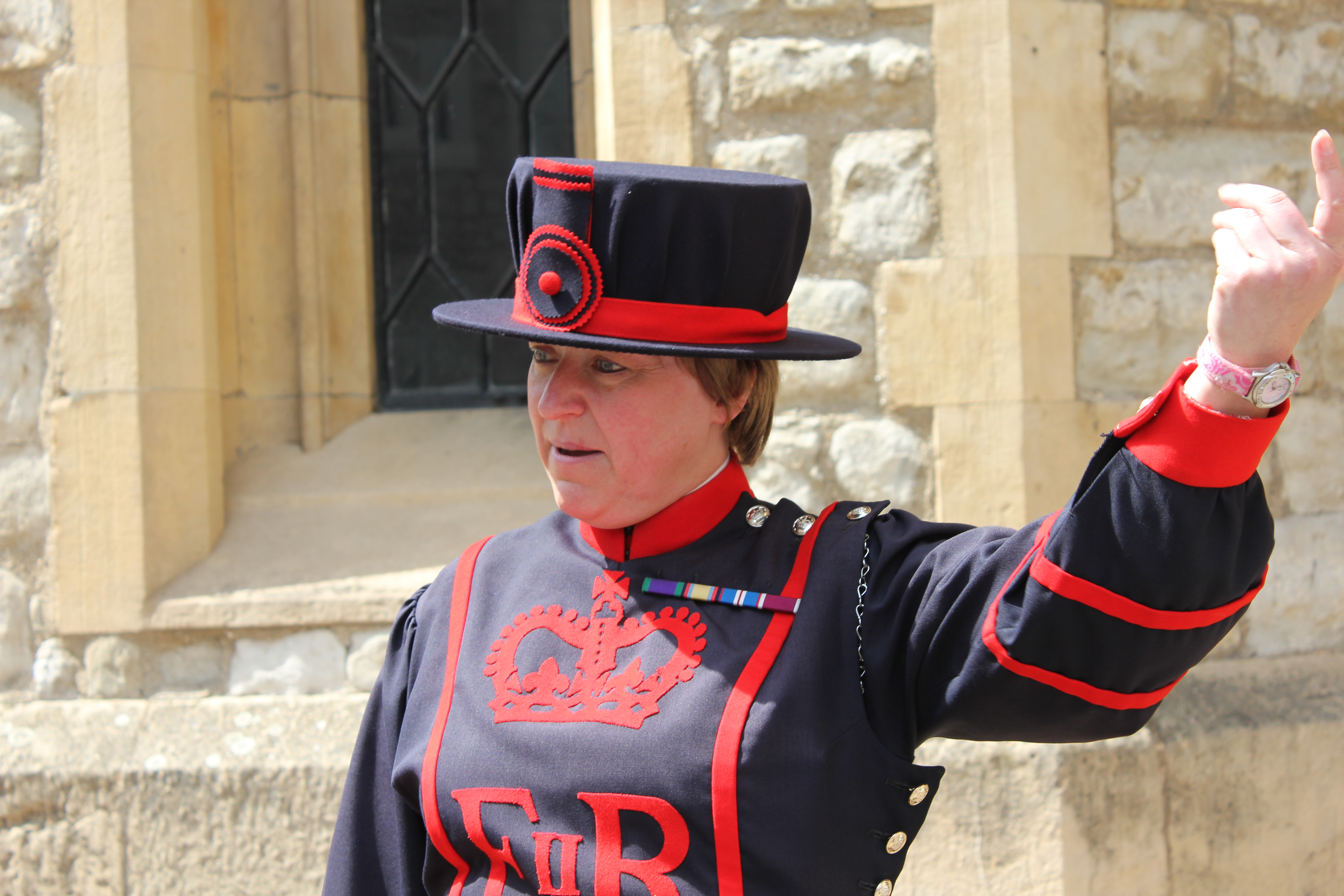
Moira Cameron in 2011

Cameron officially became the first ever female Yeoman Warder in July 2007 but did not get to wear her uniform until 3 September 2007. Cameron was one of 37 Yeoman Warders based in the Tower of London, a position which dates back to 1485. Styled as Yeoman Warder Cameron, her full and proper title was Yeoman Warder of Her Majesty's Royal Palace and Fortress the Tower of London, and Members of the Sovereign's Body Guard of the Yeoman Guard in the Extraordinary.

Cameron's duties were mostly connected to the Tower, but can involve some outside ceremonies. Within the Tower, Cameron's role was to take care of public visitors to the Tower and perform guided tours, guard the Crown Jewels, perform the Ceremony of the Keys and look after the Ravens of the Tower. Outside the Tower, Warders duties are to attend the Coronation of the Sovereign, lying-in-state, the Lord Mayor's Show, and other state and charity functions. As a Yeoman Warder, Cameron had two tailored-to-fit uniforms, the Scarlet ceremonial dress, and the 'undress' blue uniform for day-to-day duties (each in three variants of varying thickness for different seasons).

On 25 November 2009, two Yeoman Warders were dismissed after being found guilty of gross misconduct for bullying Cameron due to her gender. Three Warders had been suspended, and one was subsequently re-instated following the month-long investigation, with his role 'unproven'. One of the three also received a police caution for defacing Cameron's Wikipedia biography.

Cameron retired in Autumn 2022 after having served 15 years as a Yeoman Warder.

== First female Yeoman Warder ==
The post of Yeoman Warder had never specifically been barred to women, although due to the rules governing women in the British Army, it was only in the modern era that women were able to have a career able to meet the entry requirements. To apply for the job, applicants had to be aged between 40 and 55, have completed at least 22 years' service in either the Army, Royal Air Force or Royal Marines reaching the rank of Warrant Officer or Senior Non-Commissioned Officer (NCO), and have been awarded the Long Service and Good Conduct Medal. It was announced on 3 January 2007 that an unnamed female would be replacing a retiring Yeoman Warder in September 2007, with WO2 Cameron, still in the Army at the time, publicly named as this replacement eight days later. Cameron had long been interested in the job of Yeoman Warder, and applied to an advertisement placed in Soldier Magazine in Summer 2006. Cameron was not the first woman to apply for the job of Yeoman Warder, but she was the first to pass the interview process, beating five male candidates for the vacancy.

== Personal life ==
Born in 1964, Cameron grew up in Furnace, Argyll on the west coast of Scotland, and joined the Army at the suggestion of her mother, who thought she 'needed to see the world'. As part of her job as a Yeoman Warder, she lived in the Tower of London in a subsidised apartment. In February 2011, Cameron was made a patron of The Kit Wilson Trust for Animal Welfare, an animal welfare charity based in East Sussex.

== See also ==
- Tourism in London
- Women in the military
