= Yeoman Warders Club =

Exclusive pub in the Tower of London

Coordinates: 51°30′26″N 00°04′31″W

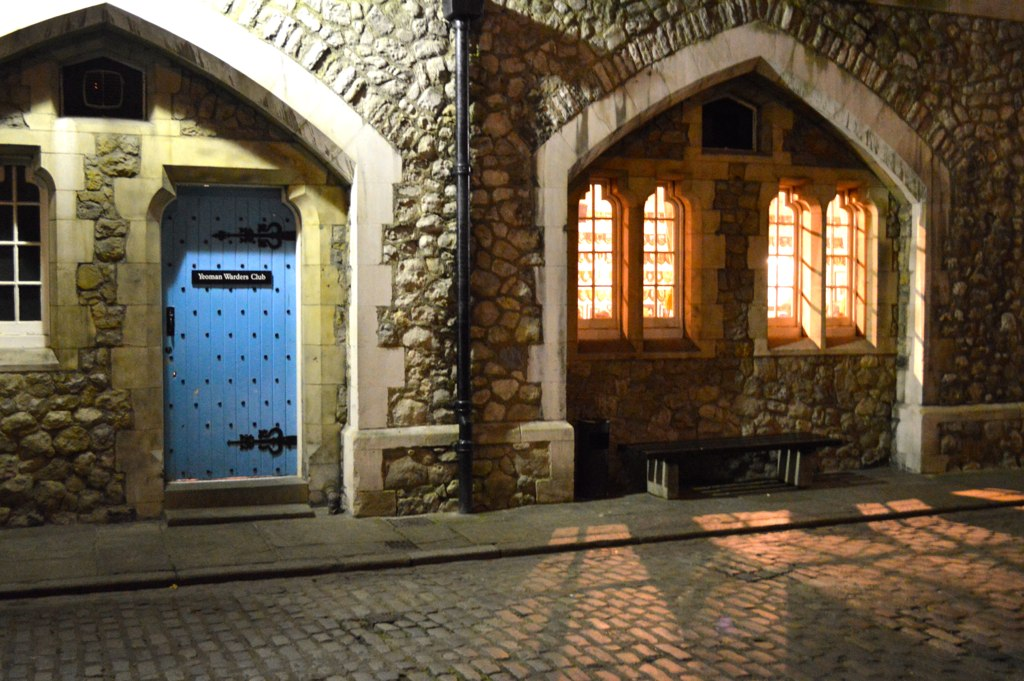
The front of the Club

The Keys, more frequently known as the Yeoman Warders Club, is a non-public pub in the Tower of London, in England, open only to the members of the Yeomen Warders, and their guests. The Yeomen Warders, who are known colloquially as the "Beefeaters", are the guards of the Tower of London; as of 2020 there were 37 Beefeaters. Beefeaters generally live in the Tower along with their families, which led to the existence of a dedicated pub. The current name of the pub, "The Keys", refers to a nightly locking-up ritual in the Tower; the name is a recent change, and the establishment was historically known as the Yeoman Warders Club. Though numerous pubs used to exist in the Tower, this is the only remaining one, and is about 150 years old.

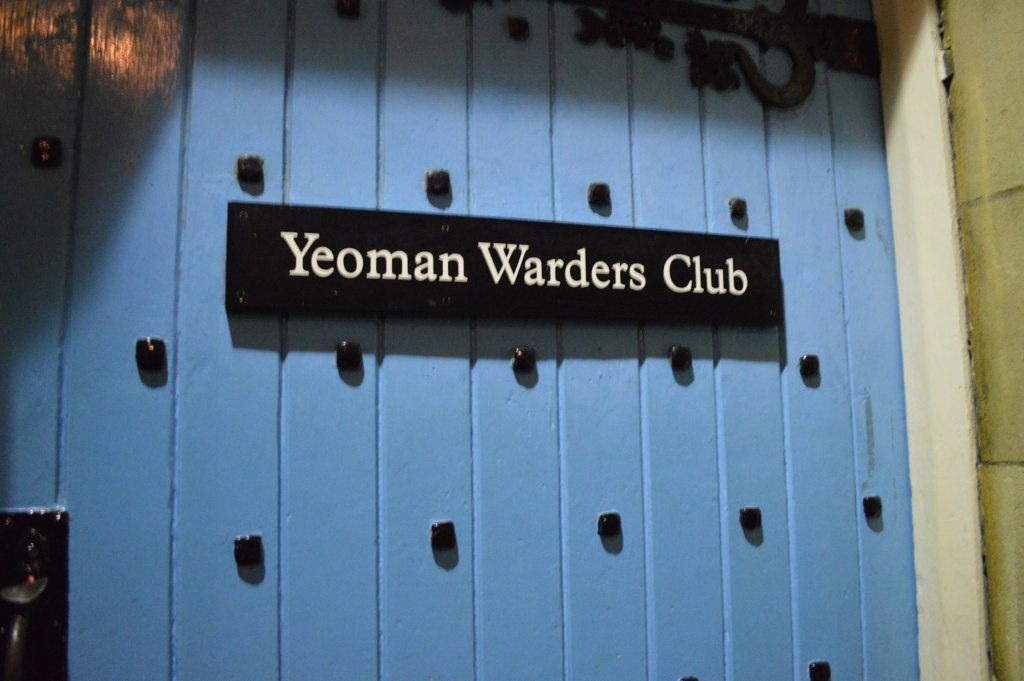
Closeup of the front door

The pub serves several unique drinks, including a "Beefeater bitter" and "Yeoman 1485" beers (1485 refers to the year the Beefeaters were founded). It also features copious amounts of Beefeater Gin. The pub enforces a strict formal dress code. Though usually only open to Warders and their guests, it is often made accessible to the public during the annual Open House London. Business Insider notes that it might be the "most exclusive pub in the world".

The pub features elegant red leather seating, and a highly detailed carpet that includes symbols of the British Monarchy. The interior is decorated with uniforms of the Beefeaters, as well as various historical artifacts from the Tower of London. Prominent among those is a signature of Rudolf Hess, who was imprisoned in the Tower during World War II. A Yeoman executioner's axe also hangs on the wall, along with a sign that marked execution spots. The pub also hosts a collection of silver goblets, which are used to swear in new recruits; the Beefeaters traditionally toast the new recruit by saying "May you never die a Yeoman Warder." The phrase originates from a now defunct custom of Beefeaters selling their position to another person when they retired; but if they died in office, the Tower would earn money from selling the vacant post instead.
