= Barney Chandler =

Yeoman Warder Ravenmaster

- Born: 1967/1968; Watford, England
- Title: Yeoman Warder Ravenmaster (2024-)
- Children: 4
- Military career
- Service: Royal Marines
- Service years: 24
- Rank: Company sergeant major
- Unit: 42 Commando

Michael 'Barney' Chandler (born 1967/1968) is the current Yeoman Warder Ravenmaster at the Tower of London. His responsibilities include the care and feeding for the ravens of the Tower of London.

Born in Watford, he was appointed the 387th Yeoman Warder in March 2009 previously serving for 24 years in the 42 Commando in the Royal Marines and reaching the rank of Company Sergeant Major. Between 2006 and 2007 he was deployed to Helmand Province in Afghanistan. His hobbies include solo motorcycle touring across Europe and travelling to see his four children who all live abroad.

After having served 15 years as a Yeoman Warder (Beefeater), in March 2024 he succeeded Christopher Skaife as Ravenmaster at the Tower of London. He heads a team of four other Beefeaters in the care of the eight ravens at the Tower.
