= Ceremony of the Keys =

Ceremony of the Keys may refer to:

- Ceremony of the Keys (Edinburgh), a ceremony at the start of the British monarch's week-long residence there in July
- Ceremony of the Keys (Gibraltar), a re-enactment of the locking of the gates to the old Town and garrison of Gibraltar
- Ceremony of the Keys (London), an ancient ritual, held every evening at the Tower of London, when the main gates are locked for the night
