= Traitors' Gate =

Entrance to the Tower of London

Coordinates: 51.5074°N 0.0770°W

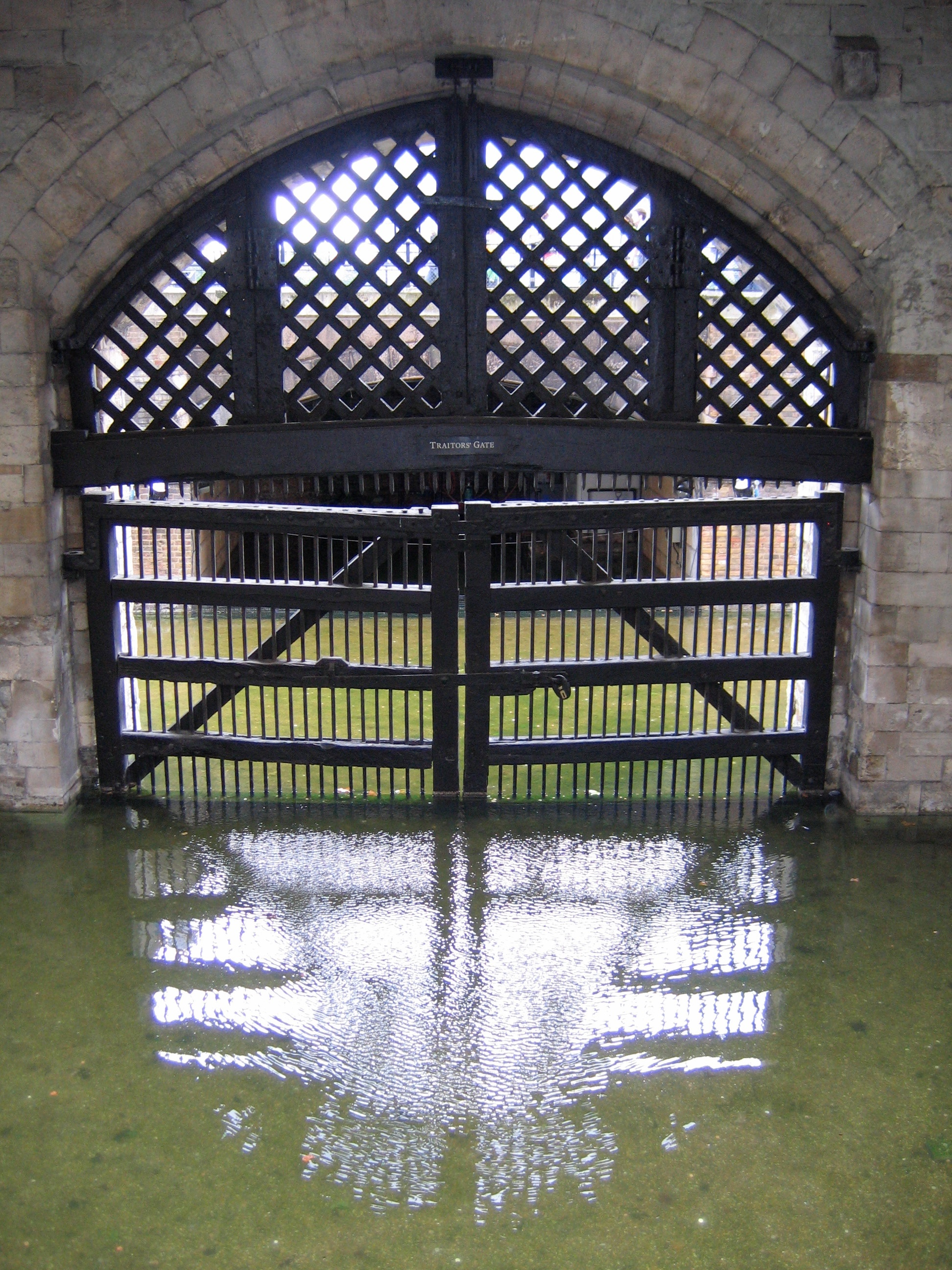
Traitors' Gate, 2007

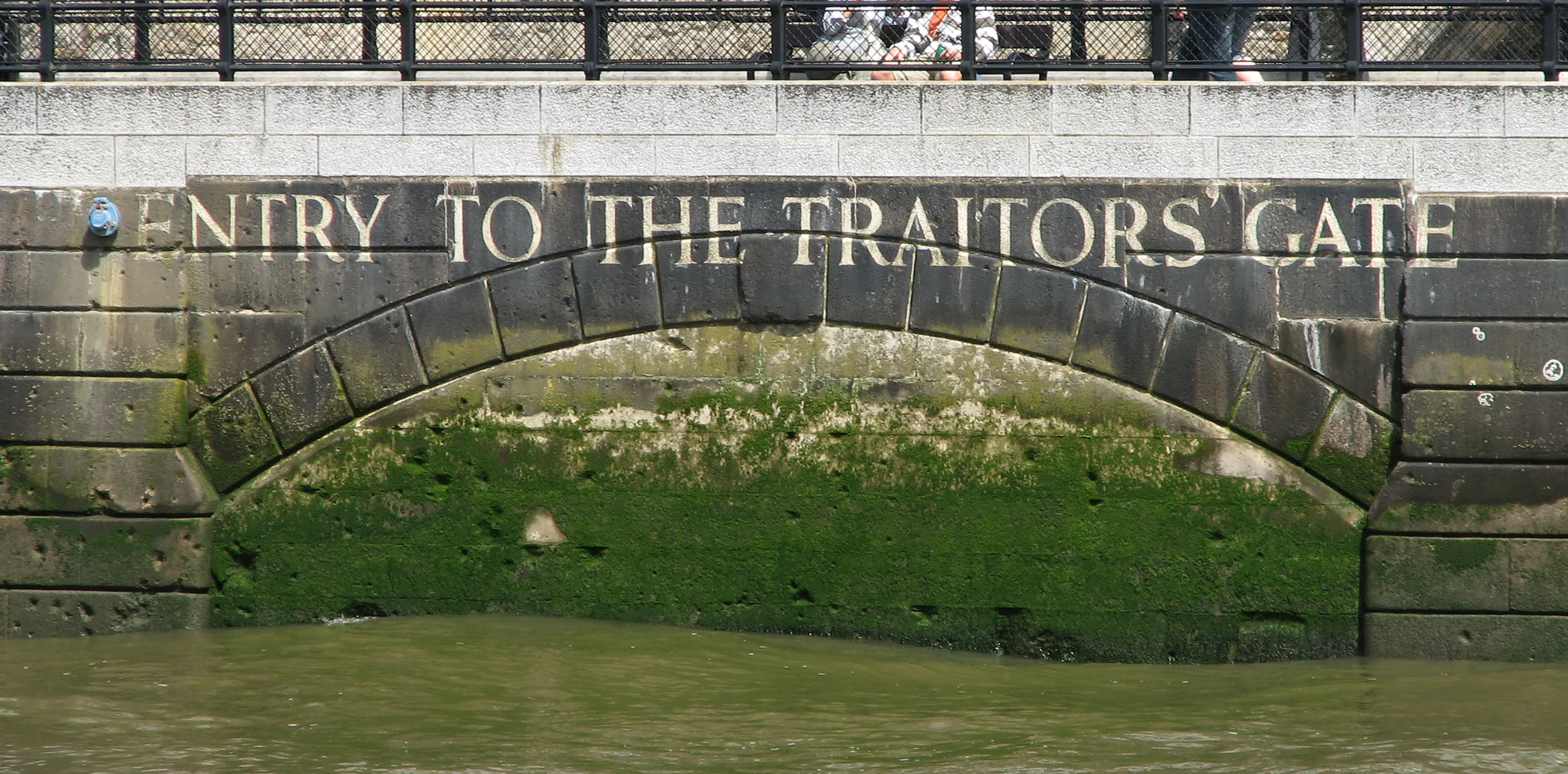
Traitors' Gate

The Traitors' Gate is an entrance through which many prisoners of the Tudors arrived at the Tower of London. The gate was built by Edward I to provide a water gate entrance to the Tower, part of St. Thomas' Tower, a section of the tower designed to provide additional accommodation for the royal family.

In the pool behind Traitors' Gate was an engine that was used for raising water to a cistern on the roof of the White Tower. The engine worked originally by the force of the tide or by horsepower and eventually by steam. In 1724–1726, it was adapted to drive machinery for boring gun barrels. It was removed in early 1866.

The name Traitors' Gate has been used since before 1543, when that name is used on Anton van den Wyngaerde's panorama of London. Prisoners were brought by barge along the Thames, passing under London Bridge, where the heads of recently executed prisoners were displayed on spikes. Notable prisoners such as Sir Thomas More entered the Tower by Traitors' Gate.

Although Anne Boleyn is often reported to have passed through the Traitors' Gate after her arrest, the contemporary chronicle of Charles Wriothesley stated she passed through only a "court gate" (in the Byward Tower). The future Elizabeth I was brought to the Tower on 18 March 1554, following Wyatt's Rebellion, and John Foxe vividly described her reception, without specific mention of the gate.
