= Yeomen Warders =

Ceremonial guardians of the Tower of London

Yeomen Warders of His Majesty's Royal Palace and Fortress the Tower of London
- Badge of the Yeomen Warders
- Active: 1485 (1509: see History) – present
- Country: United Kingdom
- Role: Palace and Fortress Guard
- Garrison/HQ: London
- Motto: Dieu et mon droit

Commanders
- Colonel in Chief: Charles III
- Chief Yeoman Warder: Paul Langley

Insignia
- Collar Badge: Rose, Thistle and Shamrock

The Yeomen Warders of His Majesty's Royal Palace and Fortress the Tower of London, and Members of the Sovereign's Body Guard of the Yeoman Guard Extraordinary, popularly known as the Beefeaters, are ceremonial guardians of the Tower of London. In principle they are the palace guard, responsible for looking after any prisoners in the Tower, and safeguarding the British crown jewels. They have also conducted guided tours of the Tower since the Victorian era.

All warders are retired from the British Armed Forces and must be former warrant officers with at least 22 years of service. They must also hold the Long Service and Good Conduct Medal. The garrison consists of 32 (formerly 37) Yeomen Warders and one Chief Warder.

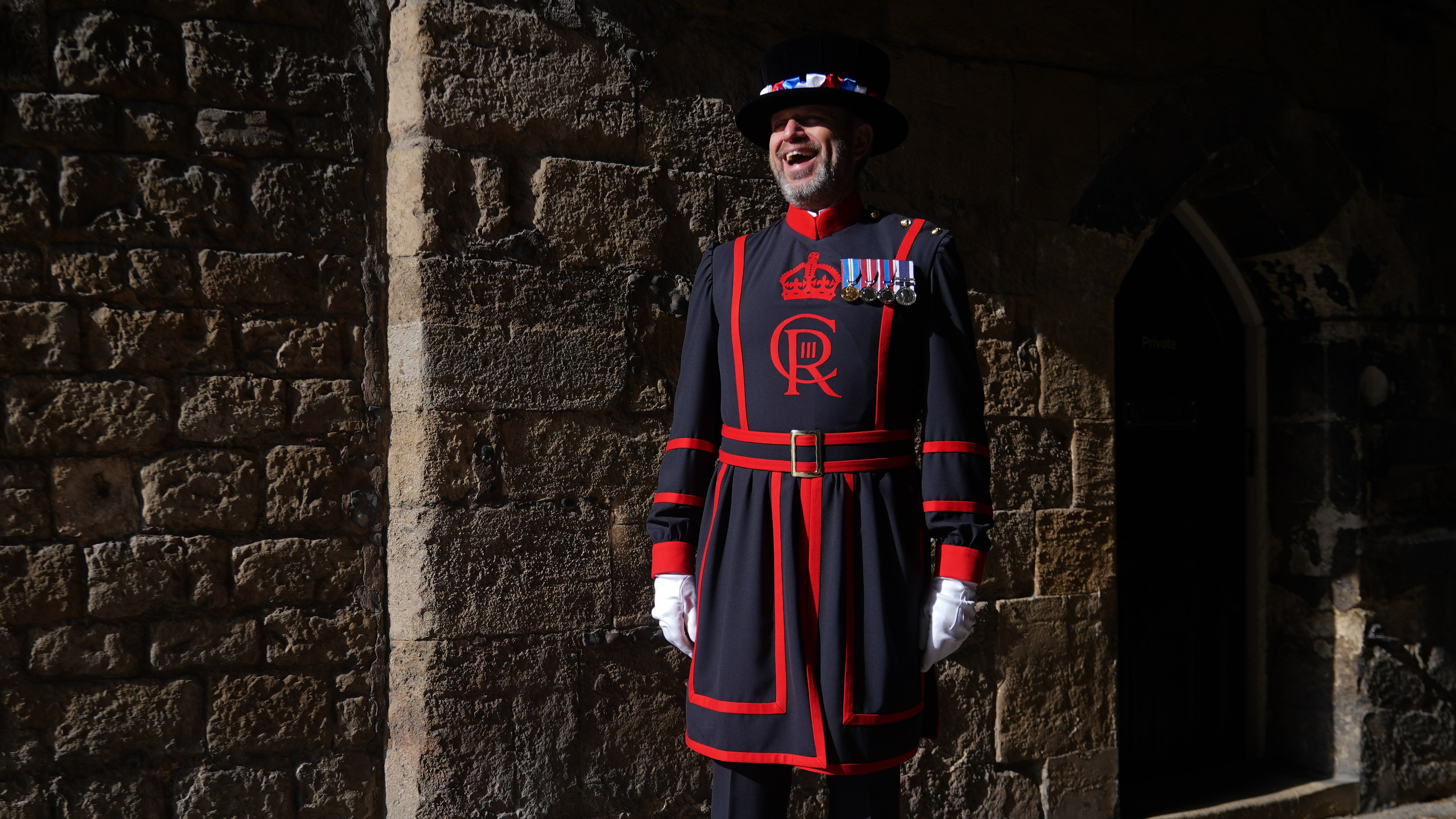
A Yeoman Warder in his newly produced dress showing Charles III's Cypher. Photographed at the gates of the Tower of London on 24th April 2023

Although the Yeomen Warders are often referred to as Yeomen of the Guard, a distinct corps of Royal Bodyguards of the British monarch, the Yeomen Warders are in fact a separate entity but share with them the nickname, "Beefeaters".

== Etymology of Beefeater ==
The name Beefeater is of uncertain origin, with various proposed derivations. The term was common as early as the 17th century as a slang term for the English in general. The earliest connection to the Royal Household came as a reference to the Yeomen of the Guard by Cosimo III de' Medici, Grand Duke of Tuscany, who visited the Court in 1669. In referring to the Yeomen of the Guard, he stated, "A very large ration of beef is given to them daily at the court, and they might be called Beef-eaters". The Beefeater name was carried over to the Yeomen Warders, due to the two corps' outward similarities and the Yeoman Warders' more public presence. Beefeaters also commonly produced and consumed broths made of beef, which were described as rich and hearty. These broths were known, at the time, as bef or beffy.

While this is the most-cited etymology, including by the Corps themselves, some etymologists have noted the term's similarity to hláf-æta, the Old English term for a menial servant, lit. "loaf-eater", the counterpart of hlaford "loaf-warden" and hlæfdige, which became "lord" and "lady" respectively. Claims that the name derives from buffetier (an Old French term meaning "a waiter or servant" at a sideboard) are often mentioned, since one role of Beefeaters was to attend the king at meals. However, Skeat in An Etymological Dictionary of the English Language (published 1879–1882), concludes that there is "not the faintest tittle of evidence" for this conjecture. Other reliable sources also indicate that buffetier is unlikely to have been the source of the word.

== History ==
=== The Tudor Yeomen ===
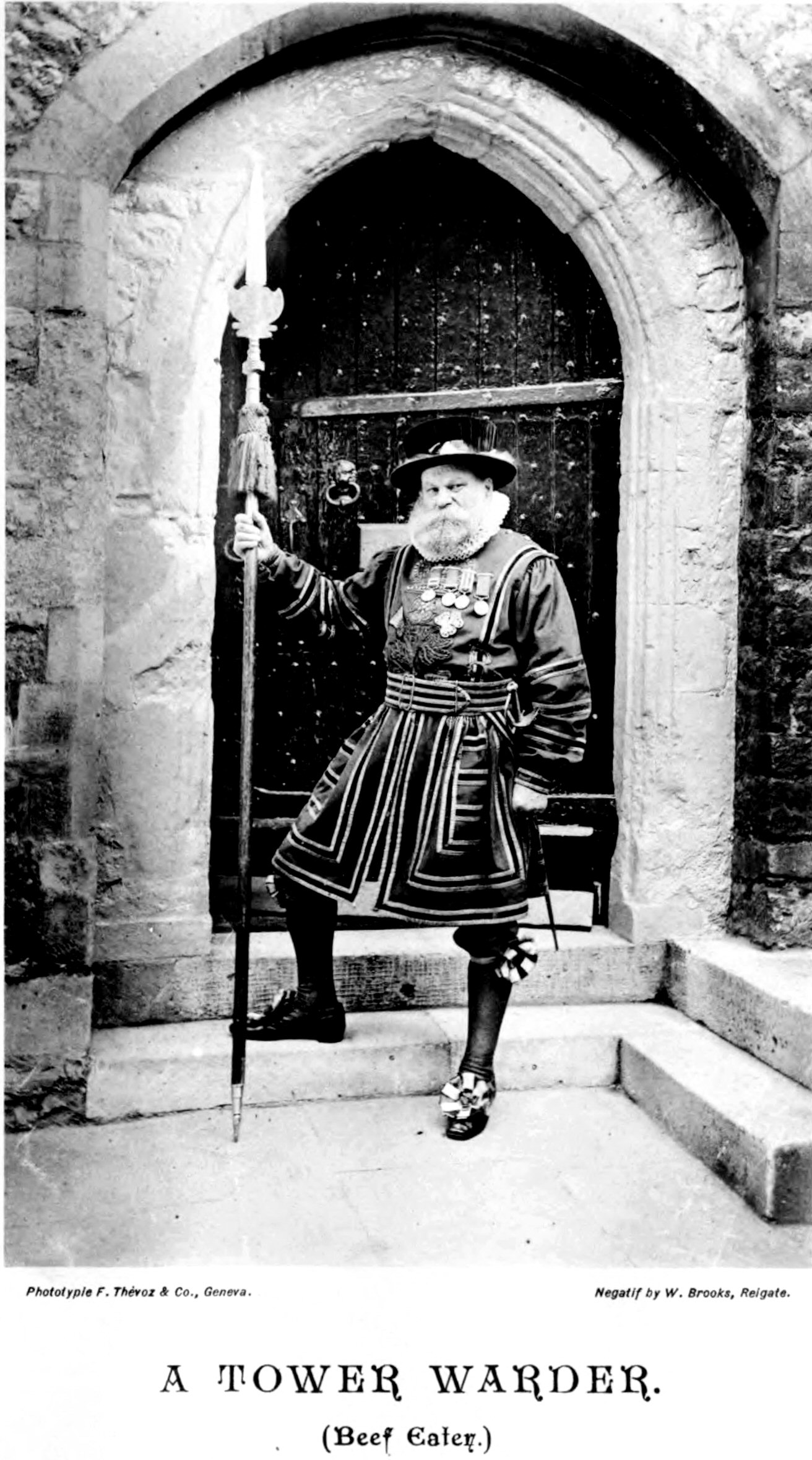
A Tower Warder (Beef Eater) 1893

The Yeomen Warders were formed in 1485 by the new King Henry VII, the first monarch of the Tudor dynasty. The Tudor rose, a heraldic badge of the dynasty, is part of the badge of the Yeomen Warders to this day. Founded after the Battle of Bosworth, it is the UK's oldest existing military corps and the oldest of the royal bodyguards.

In 1509, Henry VIII moved his official residence from the Tower of London. The Tower retained the formal status of a royal palace and to mark this a party of twelve Yeomen of the Guard was left in place as a token garrison. The title of this detachment was subsequently changed to that of Tower warders as a more accurate reflection of their duties. As warders without any ceremonial state functions they forfeited the right to wear the scarlet royal livery of the now separate Yeoman of the Guard. This was, however, restored to them during the reign of Edward VI (1547–1553), reportedly at the request of a high court official who had been briefly imprisoned in the Tower and was impressed by the behaviour of the warders.

The original Tudor guard was split into two categories: the ordinary (i.e., permanent) guard and the additional troops of the extraordinary. In 1550, for example, the ordinary mustered 105 men, with an additional 300 extraordinary yeomen. Until 1549, the guards at the Tower were numbered among the extraordinary but in that year were raised to the status of ordinary yeomen. There was a considerable wage difference between the two groups. In 1562, a yeoman of the ordinary received 16 d. per day, whereas an extraordinary yeoman was paid the same as a common infantryman (4d. or 6d.). In 1551, the ordinary was expanded to 200 men, of whom 100 were to be archers and 100 halberdiers, but these numbers were not maintained. Uniform at this time was a velvet coat trimmed with silver gilt, worn over armour.

The Yeomen Warders provided the permanent garrison of the Tower, but the Constable of the Tower could call upon the men of the Tower Hamlets to supplement them when necessary. The Tower Hamlets was an area significantly larger than the modern London Borough of the same name, which owed military service to the Constable in his ex officio role as Lord Lieutenant of the Tower Hamlets.

== Current duties ==
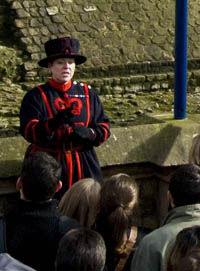
Moira Cameron, the first female Yeoman Warder

In 2018, there were 37 Yeomen Warders and one Chief Warder. At one time they were primarily guards, but more recently their role is mainly ceremonial; they have become greeters and guides for visitors, as part of their 21 duties.

All Yeoman Warders are retired members of the armed services. To be appointed, one must be "a former Warrant Officer, class 1 or 2, (or the equivalent rank in other services) and in exceptional circumstances, a Staff Sergeant" from the Royal Navy, British Army, Royal Air Force, or Royal Marines; must have earned the Medal for Long Service and Good Conduct (or the Naval or RAF equivalent); and must have served for 22 years in the regular armed services. Until 2009, sailors were ineligible to become Yeomen Warders. This was because sailors of the Royal Navy—unlike soldiers, marines, and airmen—swear an oath of allegiance to the Admiralty rather than the monarch personally; this was changed, however, following the Armed Forces Act 2006. In 2009, sailors became eligible to join the Yeoman Warders after Queen Elizabeth II consented to a petition from the Governor of the Tower to allow Royal Navy senior ratings to serve.

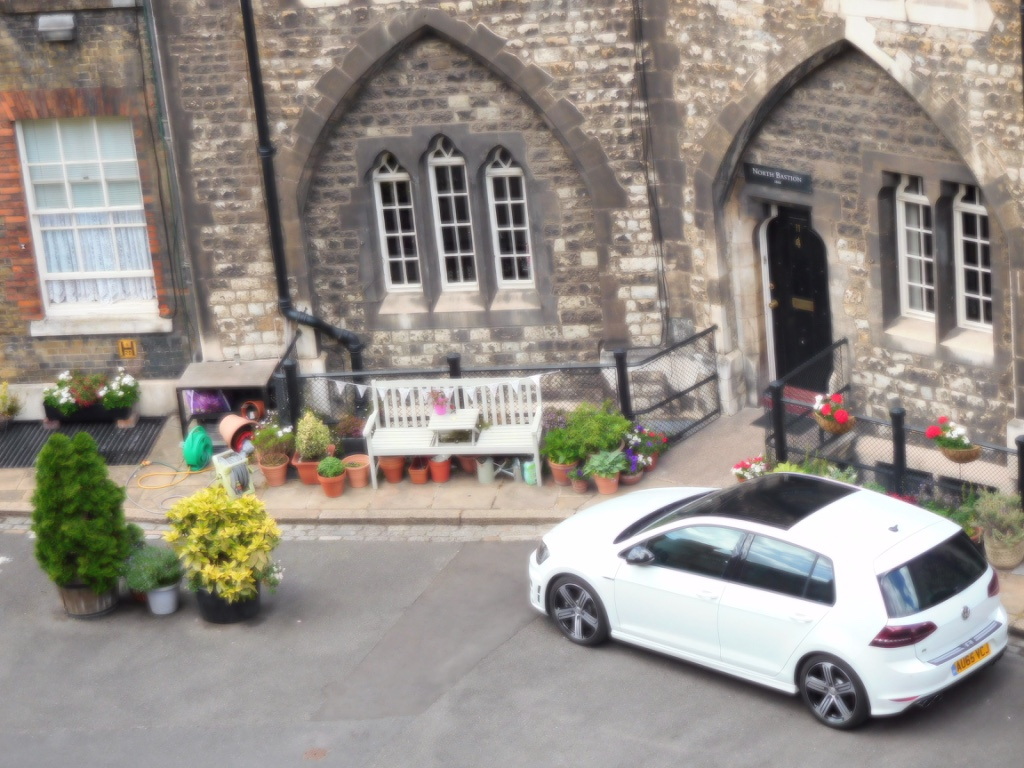
Tower of London, residential house.

The Yeomen Warders and their families live in tied accommodation inside the fortress, paying council taxes and rent. Most also have a home outside the grounds in order to have a break from their work environment. The Yeoman Warders Club is a pub exclusively for the Warders and for their invited guests. They must own a home outside the fortress to occupy when they retire. Some of the accommodation dates back to the 13th century. The community of the Tower of London is made up of Yeoman Warders and their families, the Resident Governor and officers, a chaplain and a doctor.

Yeomen Warders participate in the Ceremony of the Keys each night.

On 1 July 2007, Moira Cameron became the first female Yeoman Warder. In 2009, three male warders were suspended, accused of bullying Cameron; two were dismissed and one was re-instated following the month-long investigation.

In December 2018, alongside other employees of Historic Royal Palaces, the yeomen staged walkouts of several hours in protest of planned changes to their pension benefit scheme, the first such action since 1963.

In July 2020, Historic Royal Palaces (HRP), the charity that looks after the Tower of London, announced a compulsory redundancy order following losses in tourist revenue from the COVID-19 lockdown. This included the first ever Yeomen Warder redundancies. Compulsory redundancies were avoided, but five warders took voluntary redundancy.

As of July 2025, the Chief Yeoman Warder is former RAF serviceman Paul Langley and the Yeoman Gaoler is John Donald, who served with the King’s Royal Hussars.

== Uniforms ==
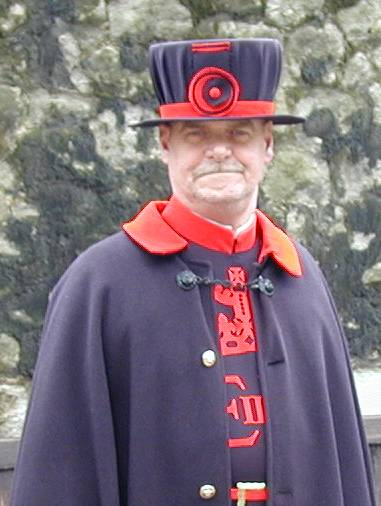
Yeoman Warder wearing a cloak with red collar and red inner lining

The Yeomen Warders normally wear an "undress" uniform of dark blue with red trimmings. For senior warders from serjeant up, the upper edges of the "undress" uniform's red collar and cuffs are trimmed with gold braid. When the sovereign visits the Tower, or the warders are on duty at a state occasion, they wear red and gold uniforms similar to those of the Yeomen of the Guard. These uniforms are referred to by the Yeoman Warders as the Tudor State Dress.

=== Differences between Yeomen Warders and Yeomen of the Guard ===
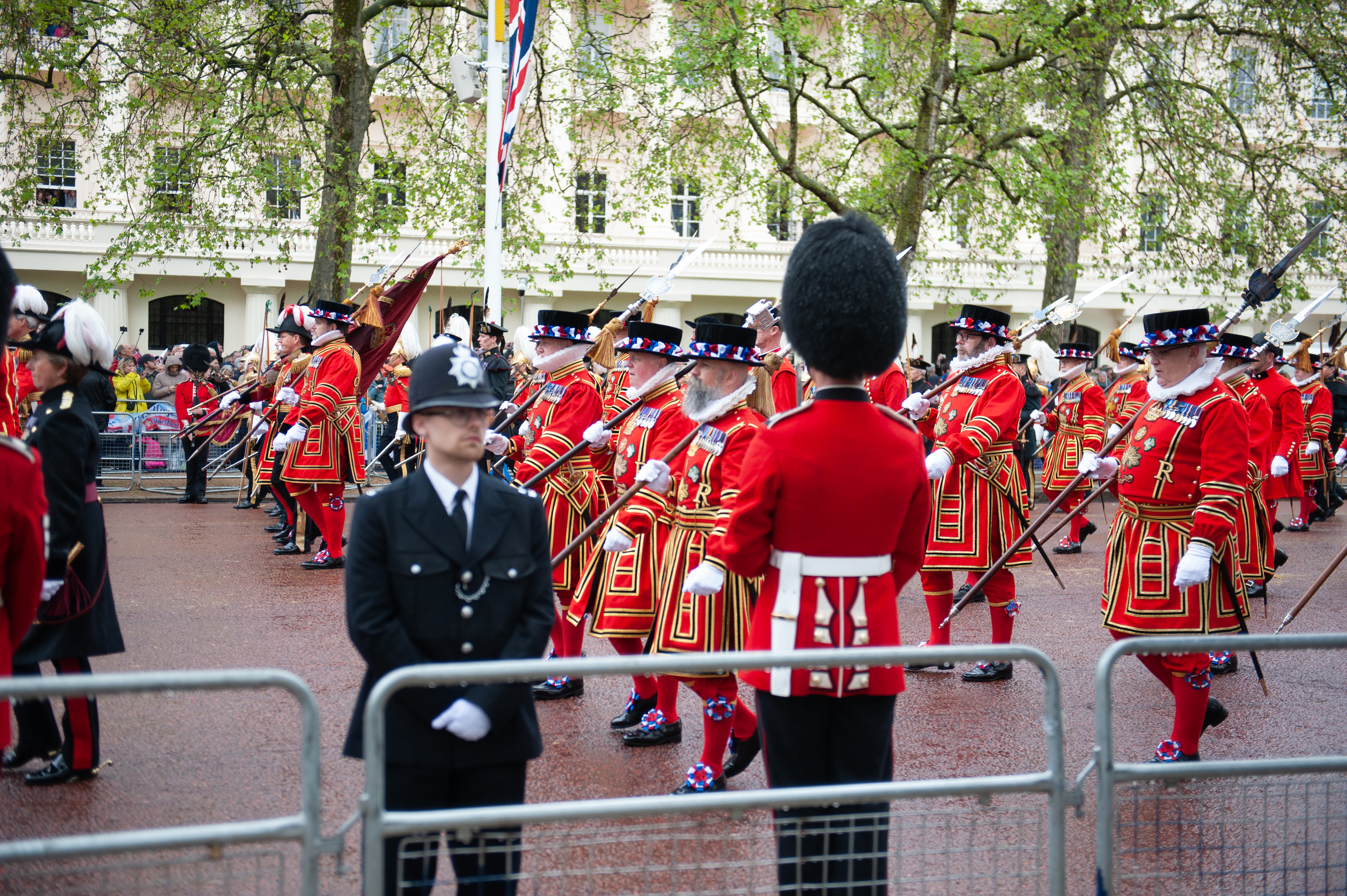
Yeomen Warders wearing their Tudor State Dress in the Coronation Procession of King Charles III and Queen Camilla, 6 May 2023.

The Yeomen Warders are often confused with the Sovereign's Body Guard of the Yeomen of the Guard, the original "Beefeaters", a similar but distinct body. On ceremonial occasions, the Yeomen Warders wear the Yeomen of the Guard's distinctive uniform, which consists of a royal red tunic with purple facings and stripes and gold lace ornaments, red knee-breeches and red stockings, flat hat, and black shoes with red, white and blue rosettes. The gold-embroidered emblems on the back and front of the coats consist of the crowned Tudor Rose, the shamrock and the thistle, the motto Dieu et mon droit, and the royal cypher of the reigning sovereign. The State Dress is often worn without a ruff, which is reserved for highly official occasions.

The item of uniform that distinguishes the Yeomen of the Guard from the Yeomen Warders is the red cross-belt or baldric, worn from the left shoulder. This is a relic from the time when the Guard, and not the Warders, carried the harquebus. Paradoxically, the Yeomen Warders wear (like the Yeomen of the Guard) a black shoulder strap on the back, below the left shoulder, originally intended to hold the harquebus bandolier in place.

== Ranks, appointments and insignia ==
Rank	Insignia
Chief Yeoman Warder	Four gold chevrons and a gold crown above. On the chevrons, a pair of crossed gold keys bordered in red, the key bits pointing down
Yeoman Gaoler	Four gold chevrons and a gold crown above. A gold miniature of the Norman White Tower on the chevrons
Yeoman Clerk	Four gold chevrons and a gold crown above
Yeoman Warder Serjeant	Four gold chevrons
Yeoman Warder Ravenmaster	(no rank but appointment) Red circular cloth badge, with a black raven head protruding from three gold merlons, the badge's lower half surrounded by a gold laurel wreath
Yeoman Warder	No insignia

The rank chevrons point down and are worn on the right upper arm. The Ravenmaster's badge is worn on the right lower arm. When wearing State dress, the Chief Yeoman Warder has a black cane as additional sign of his dignity. Instead, on special or highly official occasions, he carries a ceremonial staff topped by a miniature of the White Tower. The Yeoman Gaoler is the Chief Yeoman Warder's second-in-command. When wearing State dress, he is armed with a Dane axe, a long-handed battle-axe that had originated with the Vikings. In State dress, all Yeoman Warders are armed with saber-hilted swords, with the ordinary Warders and Serjeants also armed with partisans.

== Ravenmaster ==
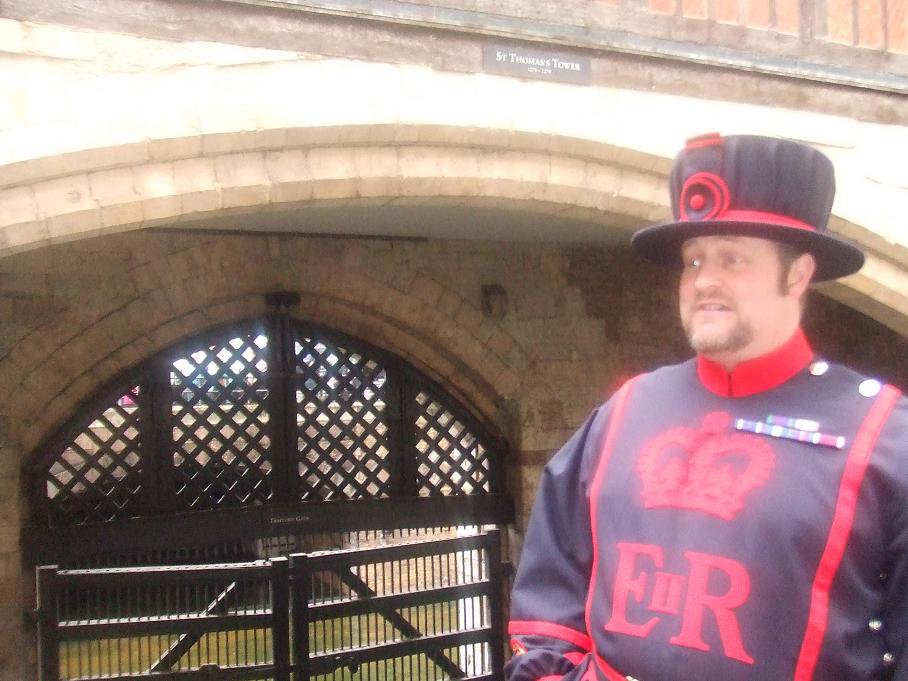
Chris Skaife – the former Ravenmaster in front of the Traitors' Gate

Yeoman Warder Ravenmaster (also known as the Ravenmaster for short) is an appointment, not a rank, of that Yeomen Warder responsible for the welfare of the Tower of London ravens. The official title has been in use since the 1960s.

It is not known how long the ravens have been living in the Tower of London, but they were resident by the time of King Charles II. Legend maintains that should the ravens ever leave the Tower, the White Tower will fall and disaster will befall the kingdom. When John Flamsteed, the "astronomical observator", complained that the ravens interfered with observatory work, Charles initially ordered them destroyed, but reminded of the legend, the story goes that he decided instead to relocate the Royal Observatory to Greenwich. He decreed that at least six ravens must always remain at the Tower. The presence of captive ravens probably goes back only to the late 19th century. According to one source, a picture of captive ravens from 1883 is the first known reference to the birds.

As of 2024, the Yeoman Warder Ravenmaster of the Tower of London is Company Sergeant Major Barney Chandler (a former Royal Marine), who took over from Colour Sergeant Christopher Skaife (a former Drum Major with the Princess of Wales's Royal Regiment). Skaife will continue as a Yeoman Warder but taking on other duties.

To prevent the ravens flying away, their flight feathers have traditionally been trimmed so that they are unable to fly in a straight line for any appreciable distance. The ravens are free, however, to roam the Tower grounds. More recently, the Ravenmaster has been clipping less of the wings and feathers, to allow them to fly, instead of merely hopping or gliding, and they can reach the top of the buildings. One of the birds, Merlina, was allowed to fly to the wharf on the Thames but she always returned due to the bonding with her keeper. During Skaife's tenure to date, only one raven, Munin, escaped but was captured by a member of the public.

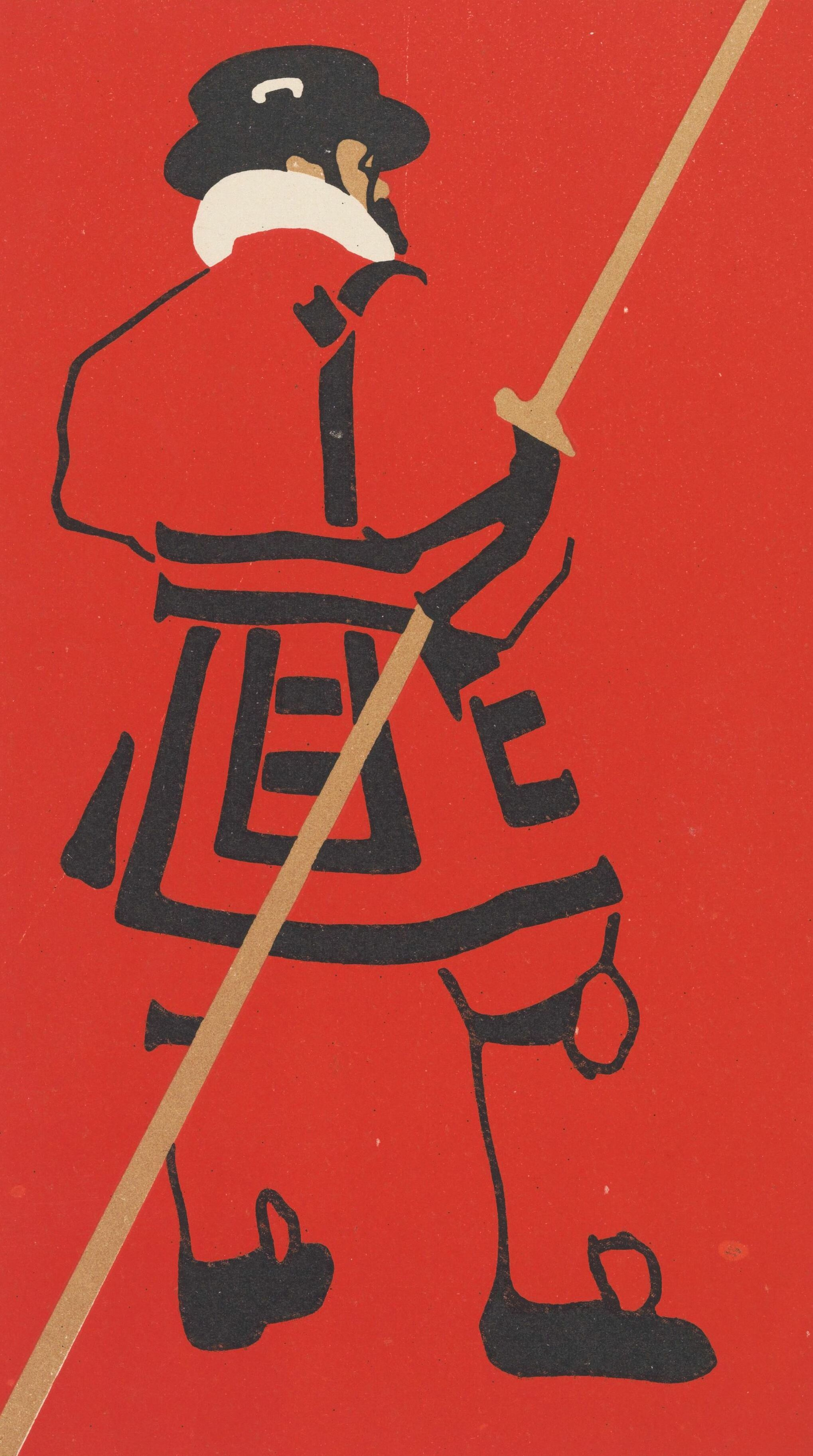
Art from Harper's Magazine in the 1890s

The Ravenmaster releases the birds from their cages and prepares breakfast for them at dawn each day. The warders have commented that the "real beefeaters" at the Tower are the ravens. Traditionally, they were fed raw beef bought at Smithfield Meat Market by the Ravenmaster. Recently, other foods have been introduced to their diet, such as chicks, lamb, mice and pig hearts, as well as peanuts and dog biscuits soaked in blood and fish, in hope that this tactic would reduce the amount of scavenging from the rubbish bins.

== Opera ==
The Tower Warders are featured in an 1888 Savoy Opera written by Gilbert and Sullivan. The Yeomen of the Guard is set in the Tower of London during the 16th century, before the two corps were split apart; it concerns what are today the Yeomen Warders.
