= Ceremony of the Keys (London) =

Ancient daily ritual at the Tower of London

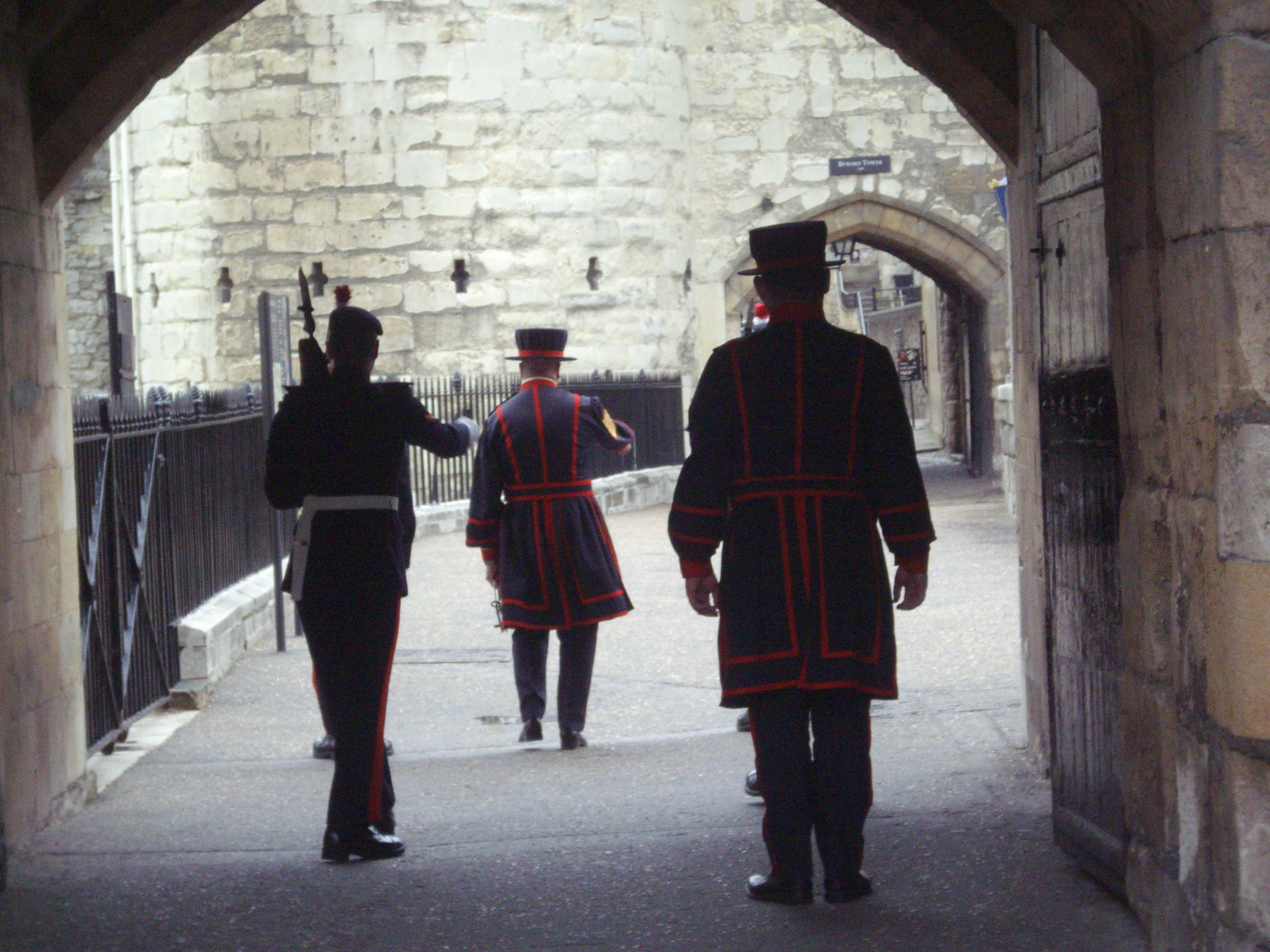
- Yeoman Warder with escort, Tower of London in May 2010
- Duration: 8 minutes
- Frequency: Daily

The Ceremony of the Keys is an ancient ritual, held every evening at the Tower of London, when the main gates are locked for the night. It is said to be the oldest extant military ceremony in the world, and is the best-known ceremonial tradition of the Tower.

== Ceremony ==
At exactly 9.52 pm, the Chief Yeoman Warder, dressed in Tudor watchcoat and bonnet, and carrying a candle lantern, leaves the Byward Tower and falls in with the Escort to the Keys, a military escort made up of armed members of the Tower of London Guard. The Warder passes his lantern to a soldier, and marches with his escort to the outer gate. The sentries on duty salute the King's Keys as they pass.

The Warder first locks the outer gate and then the gates of the Middle and Byward Towers. The Warder and escort march down Water Lane, until they reach the Bloody Tower archway where a sentry challenges the party to identify themselves: (Note: The precise wording of the challenge/response differs very slightly between sources)

Sentry: "Halt! Who comes there?"

Chief Warder: "The keys".

Sentry: "Whose keys?"

Chief Warder: "King Charles's keys".

Sentry: "Pass King Charles's Keys. All's well".

The Warder and escort march down to the foot of Broadwalk Steps where the main Tower Guard is drawn up to meet them. The party halts, and the officer in charge gives the command to present arms. The Chief Warder steps forward, doffs his bonnet, and proclaims:

Chief Warder: "God preserve King Charles".

Guard: "Amen!"

On the answering "Amen", the clock of the Waterloo Barracks strikes 10pm and the Last Post is sounded, marking the end of the ceremony.

The Guard is dismissed, and the Chief Warder takes the keys to the King's House for safekeeping overnight.

== History ==
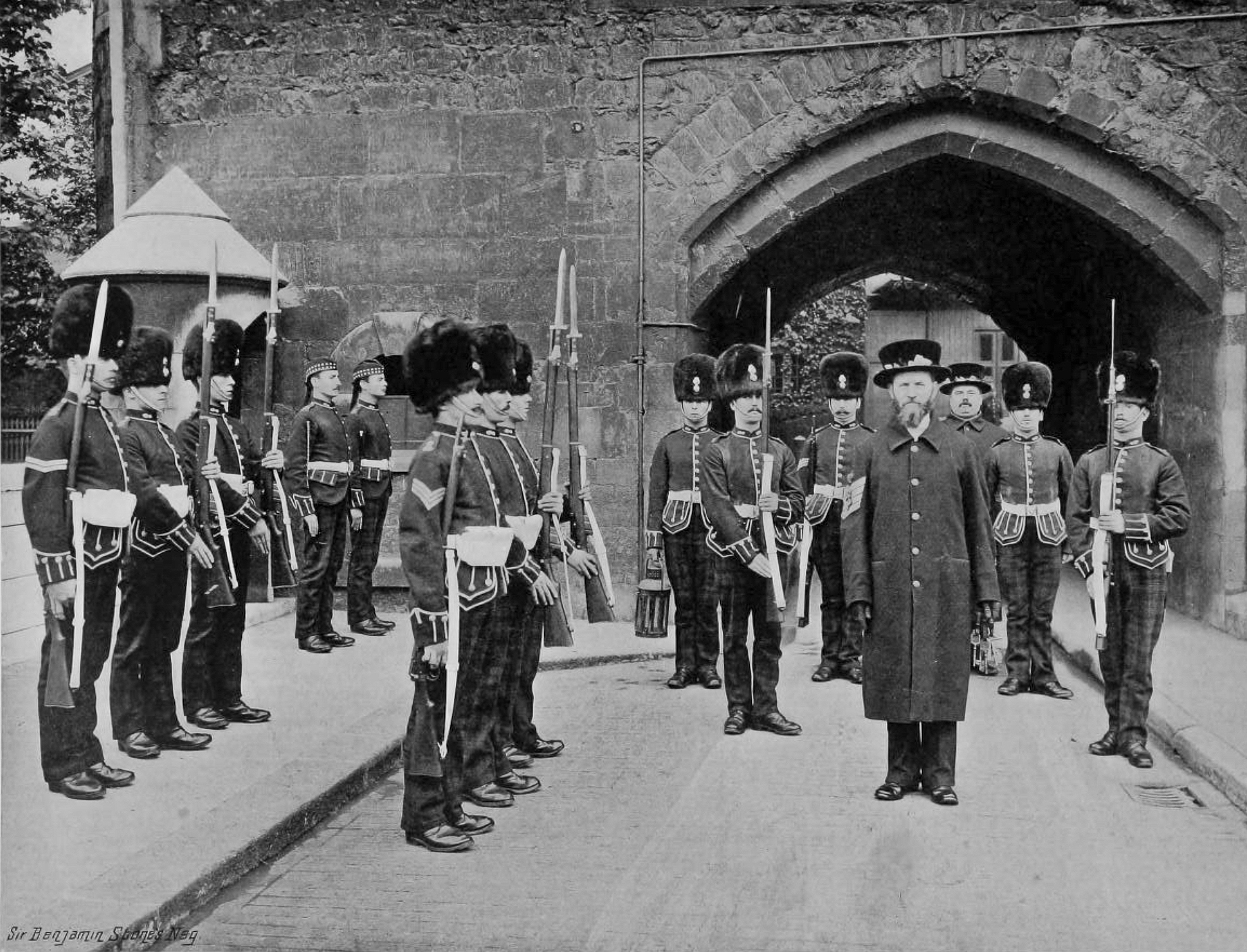
The ceremony in the Victorian era

The origins of the ceremony are unknown. It may have begun during the Middle Ages, and it is often stated that a ceremony in some form has been held since the 14th century. Written instructions that the keys should be placed in a safe place by a Tower officer, after securing the gates, date back to the 16th century. In its current form the ceremony is likely to date to the 19th century when the institution of the Yeomen Warders was reformed by the then Constable of the Tower, the Duke of Wellington.

The ceremony has never been cancelled, and has been delayed only on a single occasion due to enemy action during the Second World War. Alexander Barrie writes that on 16 April 1941 a German bomb wounded members of the escorting party, but despite this, the ceremony was completed properly.

During much of the First World War, the Honourable Artillery Company (HAC) provided the Tower garrison but in 1919 after handing back the Tower Guard to the Foot Guards, the HAC's 3rd Battalion presented a lantern to the Yeomen Warders on the 12 May 1919 as a mark of friendship during their time on duty. The lamp was used for the ceremony of the keys that night and every night ever since.

== Access ==
Between 40 and 50 visitors are allowed access to the ceremony each night, under escort. Tickets are £10 and must be obtained in advance from Historic Royal Palaces, the organisation that looks after the Tower. Tickets go on sale usually on the first working day of the month, for the following month. For example, tickets for June can be purchased on the 1st of May.

Following the suspension of public visits during the COVID-19 pandemic, the ceremony was opened to the public again from 1 June 2021.
