= High Sheriff of Radnorshire =

Welsh county ceremonial officer

== History ==
The office of High Sheriff is over 1000 years old, with its establishment before the Norman Conquest. The Office of High Sheriff remained first in precedence in the counties until the reign of Edward VII when an Order in Council in 1908 gave the Lord-Lieutenant the prime office under the Crown as the Sovereign's personal representative. The High Sheriff remains the Sovereign's representative in the county for all matters relating to the Judiciary and the maintenance of law and order.

The office of High Sheriff for Radnorshire ceased with local government re-organisation in 1974, when it was combined with the High Sheriffs of Brecknockshire and Montgomeryshire as the High Sheriff of Powys.

== List of officeholders ==
=== 16th century ===
- 17 November 1540: John Baker, of Presteigne
- 27 November 1541: James Vaughan, of Hergest
- 22 November 1542: John Bradshaw, of Presteigne
- 23 November 1543: Richard Blike, of New Radnor
- 16 November 1544: Peter Lloyd, of Boultibrook
- 22 November 1545: Rhys Gwillim, of Aberedw
- 23 November 1546: Adam Mytton, of Salop
- 27 November 1547: Thomas Lewis, of Harpton Court
- 3 December 1548: Griffith Jones, of Trewern
- 12 November 1549: James Price, of Monarchty
- 11 November 1550: Edward Price of Knighton
- 11 November 1551: John Bradshaw, the younger
- 10 November 1552: Sir Adam Mytton, of Salop
- 8 November 1553: John Bradshaw, of Presteigne
- 14 November 1554: Peter Lloyd, of Boultibrook
- 14 November 1555: Stephen Price, of Pilleth
- 13 November 1556: Evan Lewis, of Gladestry
- 16 November 1557: John Knill, of Old Radnor Burlingjobb and Knill, Herefordshire
- 23 November 1558: Sir Robert Whitney, of Whitney
- 9 November 1559: Morgan Meredith, of Llynwent
- 12 November 1560: John Price of Monarchty
- 8 November 1561: Evan Lewis of Gladestry
- 19 November 1562: Robert Vaughan of Winforton
- 8 November 1563: Griffith Jones of Llowes
- 9 November 1564: John Bradshaw, of Presteigne
- 16 November 1565: Edward Price, of Knighton
- 18 November 1566: Lewis Lloyd, of Boultibrooke
- 18 November 1567: Robert Vaughan, of Presteigne
- 18 November 1568: David Lloyd Meredith, of Nantmel
- 22 November 1569: William Lewis, of Nash
- 13 November 1570: James Price, of Monachtu
- 14 November 1571: Edward Price, of Knighton
- 26 December 1572: John Price, of Monachtu
- 14 November 1573: John Price, of Pilleth
- 15 November 1574: Evan Lewis, of Gladestry
- 15 November 1575: Hugh Lloyd, of Bettws
- 13 November 1576: Roger Vaughan, of Clyro
- 27 November 1577: Lewis Lloyd, of Boultibrook
- 17 November 1578: Rhys Lewis, of Gladestry
- 23 November 1579: Thomas Wigmore, of Shobdon
- 21 November 1580: Evan Lewis, of Gladestry
- 27 November 1581: Morgan Meredith, of Llynwent
- 5 December 1582: Thomas Hankey, of Ludlow
- 9 December 1583: Lewis Lloyd, of Boultibrook
- 19 December 1584: John Weaver, of Stepleton
- 22 November 1585: John Bradshaw, of Presteigne
- 14 November 1586: Edward Price, of Knighton
- 2 October 1587: Clement Price
- 4 December 1587: Hugh Lloyd, of Bettws
- 25 November 1588: Evan Lewis of Gladestry
- 11 December 1589: Peter Lloyd of Stocking
- 24 November 1590: Thomas Price, of Knighton
- 25 November 1591: Humphrey Cornewall, of Stanage
- 4 December 1592: Edmund Vinsalley, of Presteigne
- 26 November 1593: Clement Price, of Coedwgan
- 18 November 1594: Thomas Wigmore, of Shobdon
- 27 November 1595: James Price, of Monachty
- 22 November 1596: Richard Fowler, of Abber Cwmhir
- 25 November 1597: John Price, of Pilleth
- 28 November 1598: Lewis Lloyd, of Boultibrook
- 2 December 1599: Edward Winston, of Presteigne

=== 17th century ===
- 24 November 1600: John Bradshaw, of Presteigne
- 2 December 1601: John Price, of Pill
- 7 December 1602: Humphrey Cornewall, of Berrington
- 1 December 1603: Evan Vaughan, of Bugaildu
- 24 November 1604: Sir John Townshend, of Austin Friars, Ludlow
- 2 February 1606: Custance Whitney, of Whitney
- 17 November 1606: Sir Robert Harley, of Brampton
- 9 November 1607: John Vaughan, of Kinnersley
- 12 November 1608: Hugh Lewis, of 'le Dolly'
- November 1609: John Vaughan
- 6 November 1610: James Price, of Pilleth
- 1611 John Lloyd of Bettws
- 1612 Richard Fowler of Abbey Cwmhir
- 1613 Robert Whitney of Whitney
- 1614 Richard Jones of Trewern
- 1618 Ezekiel Beestone of Walton
- 1619 Samuel Parker of Ludlow
- 1620 Hugh Lewis of Harpton
- 1621 Humphrey Cornewall of Brampton
- 1622 Allen Currard of Presteigne
- 1623 Thomas Rhys of Disserth
- 1624 John Read of Presteigne
- 1625 Humphrey Walcot of Walcot
- 1626 Richard Fowler
- 1627 Evan Vaughan of Bugaildu
- 1628 Robert Weaver of Aylmstry
- 1629 Griffith Jones of Presteigne
- 1630 William Vaughan of Llowes
- 1631 John Maddocks
- 1632 James Philipps of Llan
- 1633 Roderic Gwynne of Llanelwedd
- 1634 Richard Rodd of Rodd
- 1635 Nicholas Meredith of Presteigne
- 1636 Morgan Vaughan of Bugaildu
- 1637 Morris Lewis of Stones
- 1638 Evan Davies of Llanddewi
- 1639 Brian Crowther of Knighton
- 1640 Robert Williams of Caebalfa
- 1641 John Powell of Stanage
- 1642 William Latchard of Bettws
- 1643 Hugh Lloyd of Caefagu
- 1644 Hugh Lloyd of Caefagu
- 1645 Brian Crowther of Knighton
- 1646 Thomas Weaver of Aylmstry
- 1647 Robert Martin of New Radnor
- 1648 Robert Martin, jnr, of Bache, New Radnor
- 1649 Henry Williams of Caebalfa
- 1650 Nicholas Taylor of Presteigne
- 1651 John Dansey, Gladestry
- 1652 John Williams
- 1653 John Walsham of Knill
- 1654 Samuel Powell of Stanage
- 1655 Richard Fowler of Abbey Cwmhir
- 1656 John Davies of Monachtu
- 1657 James Price of Pilleth
- 1658 Thomas Lewis of Harpton
- 1659 Thomas Lewis of Harpton
- 1660: Evan Davies, of Llanddewi
- 1661: John Walcot, of Walcot, Shropshire
- 1662: Charles Lewis, of Hindwell
- 1663: Henry Williams, of Caebalfa
- 1664: Thomas Eaglestone, of Presteigne
- 12 November 1665: Nicholas Taylor, of Heath
- 7 November 1666: Lev. Fowler
- 6 November 1667: Andrew Philipps, of Llanddewi
- 6 November 1668: Ezekiel Beestone or Weston, of Walton>
- 11 November 1669: Roger Stephens, of Knowle
- 4 November 1670: John Walsham, of Knill
- 9 November 1671: John Richards, of Evanjobb
- 11 November 1672: Edward Davies, of Llanddewi
- 12 November 1673: James Lloyd, of Kington
- 18 November 1674: William Whitcombe, of Bettws Clyre and London
- 15 November 1675: Henry or William Probert, of Llanddewi
- 10 November 1676: Robert Cuttler, of Farrington
- 1677: Richard Vaughan, of Monmouth
- 15 November 1677: Hugh Powell, of Cwmellan
- 1679: Thomas Vaughan, of Bugaildu
- 13 November 1679: Henry Probert, of Llowes
- 4 November 1680: Sir John Edwards
- 1681 Henry Mathews of Lantwardine
- 1682 Evan Powell of Llanbister
- 1683 Thomas Lewis of Harpton
- 1684 John Davies of Coedglasson
- 1685 Samuel Powell of Stanage
- 1686 Henry Davies of Graig
- 1687 William Taylor of Norton
- 1688 Nicholas Taylor of Heath
- 1689 Richard Vaughan of Clyro
- 1690 John Fowler of Bron-y-dre
- 1691 William Probert of Llanddewi
- 1692 Thomas Vaughan of Bugaildu
- 1693 Hugh Lewis of Hindwell
- 1694 Robert Cuttler of Street
- 1695 Thomas Lewis of Nantgwillt
- 1696 William Fowler of Grainge
- 1697 Thomas Lewis of Harpton
- 1698 Thomas Williams of Caebalfa
- 1699 Walter Davies of Ludlow

=== 18th century ===
- 1700 Edward Price of Boultibrook
- 1701 John Waddeley of Hereford
- 1702 John Read of Montgomery
- 1703 [-] Price of Presteigne
- 1704 Morgan Vaughan of Bugaildu
- 1705 David Morgan of Coedglasson
- 1706 Edward Howarth of Caebalfa
- 1707 Adam Price of Boultibrook
- 1708 Hugh Gough of Knighton
- 1709 William Chase of London
- 1710 Charles Hanmer of Llanddewi
- 1711 Charles Walcot of Walcot
- 1712 Jonas Stephens of Bessbrook
- 1713 Roger Vaughan of Vron
- 1714 Walter Price of Cefnbwll
- 1715 Edward Fowler of Abbey Cwmhir
- 1716 John Clarke of Blaiddfa
- 1717 John Miles of Evanjobb
- 1718 Marmaduke Gwynne of Garth
- 1719 Hugh Powell of Cwmellan
- 1720 Fletcher Powell of Downton
- 1721 Nicholas Taylor of Heath
- 1722 Charles Hanmer of Llanddewi
- 1723 Giles Whitehall of Moor
- 1724 Hugh Morgan of Bettws
- 1725 Folliot Powell of Stanage
- 1726 Edward Burton of Vronlas
- 1727 Edward Shipman of Buguildu
- 1728 Henry Williams of Skynlas
- 1729 Harford Jones of Kington
- 1730 John Taylor of Dilwyn
- 1731 Stephen Harris of Bessbrook
- 1732 Thomas Holland of Llangunllo
- 1733 Thomas Gronous of London
- 1734 Matthew Davies of Presteigne
- 1735 John Clarke of Blaiddfa
- 1736 John Williams of The Skreen
- 1737 John Jones of Trevannon
- 1738 Sir Robert Cornewall of Berrington
- 1739 Henry Howarth of Caebalfa
- 1740 Mansel Powell of Yerdisley
- 1741 Edward Price of Boultibrook
- 1742 Thomas Hughes of Gladestry
- 1743 Peter Rickards of Evanjobb
- 1744 William Wynter of Brecon
- 1745 William Ball of Kington
- 1746 Henry Williams of Skynlas
- 1747 John Patteshall of Puddlestone
- 1748 John Warter of Kington
- 1749 Morgan Evans of Llanbarrhyd
- 1750 Hugh Gough of Knighton
- 1751 Francis Walker of Vernyhall
- 1752 Thomas Vaughan of Bugaildu
- 1753 Richard Lloyd of Llanbadarn-fynydd
- 1754 John Bishop of Gladestry
- 1755 William Go-? of Kingwood
- 1756 John Lewis of Presteigne
- 1757 John Evans of Cwmydauddwr
- 1758 Daniel Davies of Llanbadarn-fawr
- 1759 David Stephens of Nantmel
- 1760 John Daykins of Llanbister
- 1761 John Evans of Llanbarrhyd
- 1762 Evan Vaughan of Llwynmadoc
- 1763 James Williams of Trawley
- 1764 James Broom of Ewithington
- 1765 Sir Hans Fowler of Abbey Cwmhir
- 1766 Samuel Bevan of Newchurch
- 1767 Sir John Meredith of Brecon
- 1768 John Trumper of Michaelchurch
- 1769 James Watkins, Clifford
- 1770 Marmaduke Gwynne of Garth
- 1771 Charles Gore of Ty-fannor
- 1772 William Whitcombe of Clyro
- 1773 Bernard Holland of Llanbister
- 1774 Walter Wilkins of Maeslough
- 1775 John Griffiths of Kington
- 1776 Richard Davies of Llanstephan
- 1777 William Powell of Llanwrthwl
- 1778 Harford Jones of Presteigne
- 1779 Jonathan Field of Llanbadarn-fynydd
- 1780 Thomas Cooke of Ludlow
- 1781 Jonathan Bowen of Knighton
- 1782 Thomas Bevan of Skynlas
- 1783 Thomas Price of Clascwm
- 1784 Buthe Shelley of Michaelchurch
- 1785 James Price of Clyro
- 1786 Bridgewater Meredith of Clyro
- 1787 John Price of Penybont
- 1788 Bell Lloyd of Boultibrook
- 1789 Thomas Duppa of Knighton
- 1790 Francis Garbett of Knill
- 1791 Thomas Jones of Pencerrig
- 1792 John Lewis of Harpton Court
- 1793 William Symonds, MD of Hereford
- 1794 Richard Price of Knighton
- 1795 Francis Fowke of Llanstephan
- 1796 John Pritchard of Dolyfelin
- 1797 Percival Lewis of Downton
- 1798 John Benn Walsh of Cefnllys
- 1799 John Bodenham of The Grove

=== 19th century ===
- 5 February 1800: John Brewster, of Cascob
- 5 March 1800: James Lloyd Harris, of Bryngwyn
- 11 February 1801: Thomas Hodges Fowler, of Abbey Cwmhir Hall
- 17 March 1801: Hugh Powell Evans, of Noyadd
- 3 February 1802: John Sherbourne, of Llandrindod
- 3 February 1803: Thomas Grove, of Cwm Ellan
- 10 February 1803: Marmaduke Howell Thomas Gwynne, of Llanelwedd
- 1 February 1804: Thomas Frankland Lewis of Harpton Court
- 6 February 1805: Thomas Grove, of Cwm Ellan
- 12 February 1805: Charles Rogers, of Stanage Park
- 1 February 1806: John Whittaker, of Cascob
- 19 February 1806: Thomas Stephens, of Kinnerton
- 4 February 1807: Thomas Thomas, of Pencerrig
- 11 February 1807: Edmund Burton, of Llanbister
- 3 February 1808: Thomas Thomas, of Pencerrig
- 6 February 1809: John Whittaker, of Cascob
- 31 January 1810: Harley James Hague, of Bailey House
- 8 February 1811: John Cheesment Severn, of Llangunllo
- 24 January 1812: Thomas Grove, the younger, of Cwm Ellan
- 10 February 1813: Daniel Reed, of Cornell
- 4 February 1814: Charles Humphreys Price, of Knighton
- 13 February 1815: William Davis, of Cabalva
- 1816 Sir Harford Jones, 1st Baronet of Boultibrook
- 1817 Penry Powell of Penn Llan
- 1818 Hugh Stephens of Cascob
- 1819 Morgan John Evans of Llwynbarried House
- 1820 James Crummer of Howey
- 1821 Robert Peel of Cwmelan
- 1822 Edward Rogers of Stanage Park replaced by John Hugh Powell, Clirow
- 1823 Sir John Benn Walsh, Baronet of Cefnllys
- 1824 Hugh Vaughan of Llwyn Madock
- 1825 Peter Rickards Mynors of Evenjob
- 1826 James Watt, Old Radnor
- 1827 Samuel Beavan, Glascombe
- 1828 David Thomas, Wellfield House
- 1829 John Morris, New Church
- 1830: Robert Bell Price, of Downfield, Old Radnor
- 1831: Richard Duppa, of Llanshay, died in office and was replaced by Thomas Duppa, of Llanshay
- 1832: Thomas Evans, of Llwynbarriedd
- 1833: Walter Wilkins, of Maeslough Castle
- 1834: Guy Parsons, of Bettws Disserth
- 1835: Thomas Williams, of Crossfoot
- 1836: James Williams Morgan, of Treble Hill, Glasbury
- 1837: Hans Busk, of Nantmel
- 1838: Sir John Dutton Colt, 4th Baronet, of Llanayne
- 1839: Henry Lingen, of Penlanoley
- 1840: Edward Rogers of Stanage Park
- 1841: Edward Breeze, of Knighton
- 1842: David Oliver, of Rhydoldog
- 1843: Edward David Thomas, of Wellfield House
- 1844: David James, of Presteigne
- 1845: James Davies, of Colva
- 1846: Thomas Prickard, of Dderw
- 1847: Henry Miles, of Downfield
- 1848: John Abraham Whittaker, of Newcastle Court was initially appointed, but was replaced by John Edwards, of Beguildy
- 1849: Edward Middleton Evans, of Llwynbaried
- 1850: Edward Morgan Stephens, of Llananno
- 1851: Francis Aspinal Phillips, of Abbeycwmhir
- 1852: Sir Harford Jones-Brydges, 2nd Baronet, of Boultibrook
- 1853: Jonathan Field, of Esgairdrainllwyn
- 1854: John Jones, of Cefnmaes
- 1855: John Abraham Whittaker, of Newcastle Court
- 1856: Robert Baskerville Richard Mynors, of Evancoed
- 1857: Francis Evelyn, of Corton
- 1858: Howell Gwynne Howell, of Llanelwedd Hall
- 1859: James Watt Gibson-Watt, of Doldowlod
- 1860: Henry George Philips, of Abbey Cwmhir
- 1861: George Greenwood, of Abernant
- 1862: Walter De Winton, of Maesllwch Castle
- 1863: Henry Thomas, of Pencerrig
- 1864: George Augustus Haig, of Llanbadarnfynidd
- 1865: Thomas Williams Higgins, of Cwn Llanyre
- 1866: Edward Coates, of Whitton
- 1867: Charles Marsh Vialls, of Hendre
- 1868: Walter Thomas Mynors Baskerville, of Clyro Court
- 1869: James Beavan, of Presteigne
- 1870: Edward Jenkins, of The Grove, Presteigne
- 1871: Sir John James Walsham of Knill Court, near Walton
- 1872: Robert Lewis-Lloyd of Nantgwillt
- 1873: John Percy Cheesment-Severn of The Hall, Penybont
- 1874: Richard William Banks of Ridgebourne, Kington
- 1875: John Ramsay Sladen of Rhyddoldog
- 1876: Sir Richard Green Price, Baronet of Norton Manor, Presteign
- 1877: James Vaughan of Builth
- 1878: William Williams Thomas Moore of Old Hall, Llanvihangel-Rhidithon, Knighton
- 1879: Edwin Lucas Pease of Mowden, Darlington
- 1880: Samuel Charles Evans-Williams of Bryntirion
- 1881: Cecil Alfred Tufton Otway, of Newcastle Court, Radnorshire
- 1882: Charles Coltman Coltman-Rogers of Stanage Park
- 1883: Arthur Beavan of The Court, Glascwm
- 1884: George Stovin Venables of Llysdinam Hall, Radnorshire
- 1885: John Williams-Vaughan, jnr, of The Skreen
- 1886: Sir Herbert Edmund Frankland Lewis, 4th Baronet of Harpton Court
- 1887: Francis Evelyn of Kinsham Court, Presteigne
- 1888: Lieutenant - Colonel John James, of Lyonshall
- 1889: James Allgood Beebee, of Womaston, Walton
- 1890: Charles Payne Evans, of Glasbury House, Glasbury
- 1891: Willoughby Baskerville Mynors
- 1892: William Hartland Banks of Hergest Croft, Kington
- 1893: John Corrie Carter of Cefnfaes Hall, Rhayader
- 1894: William Edwin Pease, of Mowden, Darlington, Yorkshire
- 1895: Edward David Thomas, of Welfield, Builth
- 1896: Thomas Thomas-Moore, of Old Hall, Dolau
- 1897: Walter de Winton, of Maesllwch Castle, Glasbury
- 1898: Sir Francis Edwards, 1st Baronet of the Cottage, Knighton
- 1899: Lieutenant – Colonel Stephen William Williams, of Penrally, Rhayader.

=== 20th century ===
- 1900: George Maximilian Lindner of Nantygroes, Llandrindod
- 1901: James Mansergh of Hampstead, London, & of Bryngwy, Rhayader
- 1902: Cecil Raby Stephens of Castle Vale, Llananno
- 1903: James Miller Gibson-Watt of Doldowlod
- 1904: David Price Powell of Howey Hall
- 1905: John T Jackson of Treburvaugh, Llangunllo
- 1906: Francis George Prescot Philips of Abbey Cwmhir
- 1907: Albert Simpson of Burghill Grange, Herefordshire
- 1908: Major-General Robert Children Whitehead of The Hall, Penybont
- 1909: William Stephens Bryan of Crungoed, Llangunllo
- 1910: Major Samuel Nock Thompson of Newcastle Court, Evenjobb
- 1911: James Luther Greenway of Nantmel
- 1912: Penry Vaughan Morgan of London
- 1913: James Burgess Boote of Gwernaffel, Knighton
- 1914: Herbert Clark Lewis of Saundersfoot, Pembrokeshire
- 1915: Capt John Gordon Ross of Pontshoney, Pembrokeshire
- 1916: James Luther Greenway, Nantmel
- 1917: Albert Simpson, Burghill Grange of Herefordshire
- 1918: Henry William Duff-Gordon of Harpton Court, Old Radnor
- 1919: Major Samuel Nock Thompson of Newcastle Court, Evenjobb
- 1920: Capt John Eagles Henry Graham-Clarke of Penlanole, Nantmel
- 1921: Revd Claud Edmund Lewis, Evancoyd Court of Evanjobb
- 1922: James Luther Greenway of Nantmel
- 1923: Capt Edward Aubrey Thomas of Cefndyrys, Llanelwedd
- 1924: Sir Charles Dillwyn-Venables-Llewelyn, 2nd Baronet
- 1925: Thomas Lant of Llanelwedd
- 1926: Major John Griffiths of Maesgwynne, Howey
- 1927: Capt Thomas Alban Jones of Dolgerdden, Rhayader
- 1928: Capt Spyridian Alexander Mavrojani of Clyro Court, Clyro
- 1929: Capt Gerald Graham-Clarke of The Skreen, Erwood
- 1930: Sir Robert Green-Price, Baronet of Gwernaffel, Knighton
- 1931: Brig General Wilfred Keith Evans of Caemawr, Clyro
- 1932: Llewelyn Evan-Thomas of Pencerrig, Llanelwedd
- 1933: Thomas Francis Vaughan Prickard of Y Dderw, Cwmdauddwr
- 1934: Capt Harri Williams of Glyngwy, Rhayader
- 1935: Lt-Col John Lionel Philips of Abbey Cwmhir
- 1936: Keyrick John Legge Beebee of Womaston, Walton
- 1937: Charles Christopher Josceline Littleton of Barland House, Evenjobb
- 1938: Lt-Col Noel Clive Phillips of Greenways, Llanbadarn Fawr
- 1939: Loftus Otway Clarke of Boultibrooke, Presteigne
- 1940: Andrew Miller Kerr of The Mount, Llandrindod Wells
- 1941: Rowland Tench of Shirley, Knighton
- 1942: Samuel Harold Thompson of Newcastle Court, Evenjobb
- 1943: John Henry Hutton of Old Hall, Dolau
- 1944: John Wharton Jackson of Treburvaugh, Llangunllo
- 1945: Major-General Frederick Gwyne Howell of Llanelwedd Hall, Llanelwedd
- 1946: Ronald Ralph Walker of Warden Court, Presteigne
- 1947: Evan Morgan of The Gables, Rhayader
- 1948: Tom Norton of Bryn Morfa, Llandrindod Wells
- 1949: Lt-Col James Andrew Paterson of The Close, Llandrindod Wells
- 1950: Major Claud John Ledston Lewis of Evancoyd Court, Evenjobb
- 1951: Major-General Robert Stedman Lewis of Neuadd, Cwmdauddwr
- 1952: Lt-Col Hubert Bromley Watkins of Shirley, Knighton
- 1953: Major Gerald Walter Frederick de Winton of Glanhenwye, Glasbury
- 1954: Major Geoffrey Meredith Hamer of Penlanole, Llandrindod Wells
- 1955: Guy Frederick Chambers of Green Ridge, Kington
- 1956: John Watkins of Heartsease, Stanage, Knighton
- 1957: Edward Llewelyn Thomas of Cefndyrys, Builth Wells, Breconshire
- 1958: Lt-Col Dudley Leonard King of Silia, Presteigne
- 1959: George Rowland Davies of Llowes Court, Llowes
- 1951: Major-General Robert Stedman Lewis of Neuadd, Cwmdauddwr
- 1952: Lt-Col Hubert Bromley Watkins of Shirley, Knighton
- 1953: Major Gerald Walter Frederick de Winton of Glanhenwye, Glasbury
- 1954: Major Geoffrey Meredith Hamer of Penlanole, Llandrindod Wells
- 1955: Guy Frederick Chambers of Green Ridge, Kington
- 1956: John Watkins of Heartsease, Stanage, Knighton
- 1957: Edward Llewelyn Thomas of Cefndyrys, Builth Wells, Breconshire
- 1958: Lt-Col Dudley Leonard King of Silia, Presteigne
- 1959: George Rowland Davies of Llowes Court, Llowes
- 1960: Evan Thomas Kinsey Morgan of Awelon, Rhayader
- 1961: William Herbert Evans of Harpton Farm, Walton, Presteigne
- 1962: John Godrey Garman, Broadheath of Presteigne
- 1963: William Harold Edwards of Greenwood, Broadway, Llandrindod Wells
- 1964: Colonel William Paget Careless of Shrewsbury
- 1965: Thomas Oswald Nicholls of Dolwen, Llandewy, Llandrindod Wells
- 1966: Tom Norton of Fronheulog, Ithon Road, Llandrindod Wells
- 1967: Air Vice-Marshal Sidney Osborne Bufton of Reigate, Surrey
- 1968: Gerald David Morgan of Maelog, South Street, Rhayader.
- 1969: Norman Powell Dansey Green-Price of The Hivron, Bleddfa, Knighton.
- 1970: Gwenllian Philipps of Llanstephan House, Boughrood, Llyswen, Brecon.
- 1971: Lieut-Colonel (Brevet Col.) John Anthony Tristram Barstow of Fforest Farm, Hundred House, Llandrindod Wells.
- 1972: Edward Cecil John Jones, of Penybank House, Rhayader.
- 1973: Hubert John Watkins, of The Grove, Presteigne.
- After 1973 see High Sheriff of Powys
