= Walter Wilkins =

Walter Wilkins may refer to:

- Walter Wilkins (1741–1828), member of parliament for Radnorshire, 1796–1828
- Walter Wilkins (1809–1840), member of parliament for Radnorshire, 1835–40

== See also ==
- Sir Walter Wilkin (1842–1922), lord mayor of London, 1895–96
- Walt Wilkins III, American lawyer
