= Harpton Court =

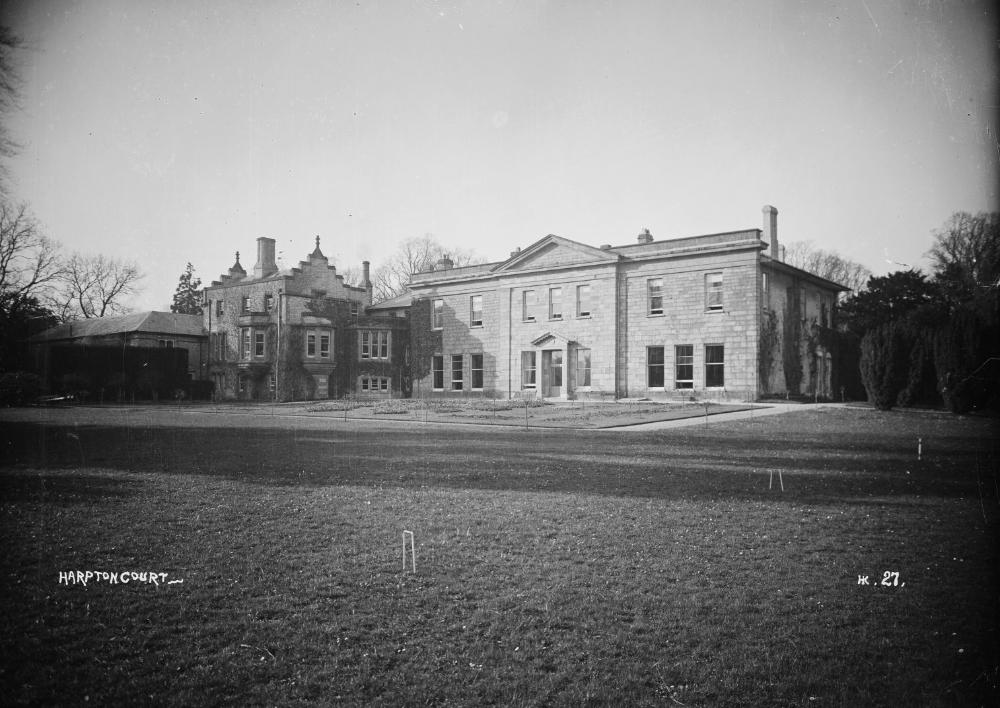
- A view of the early 1900s. The neoclassical main block to the right was demolished in 1956

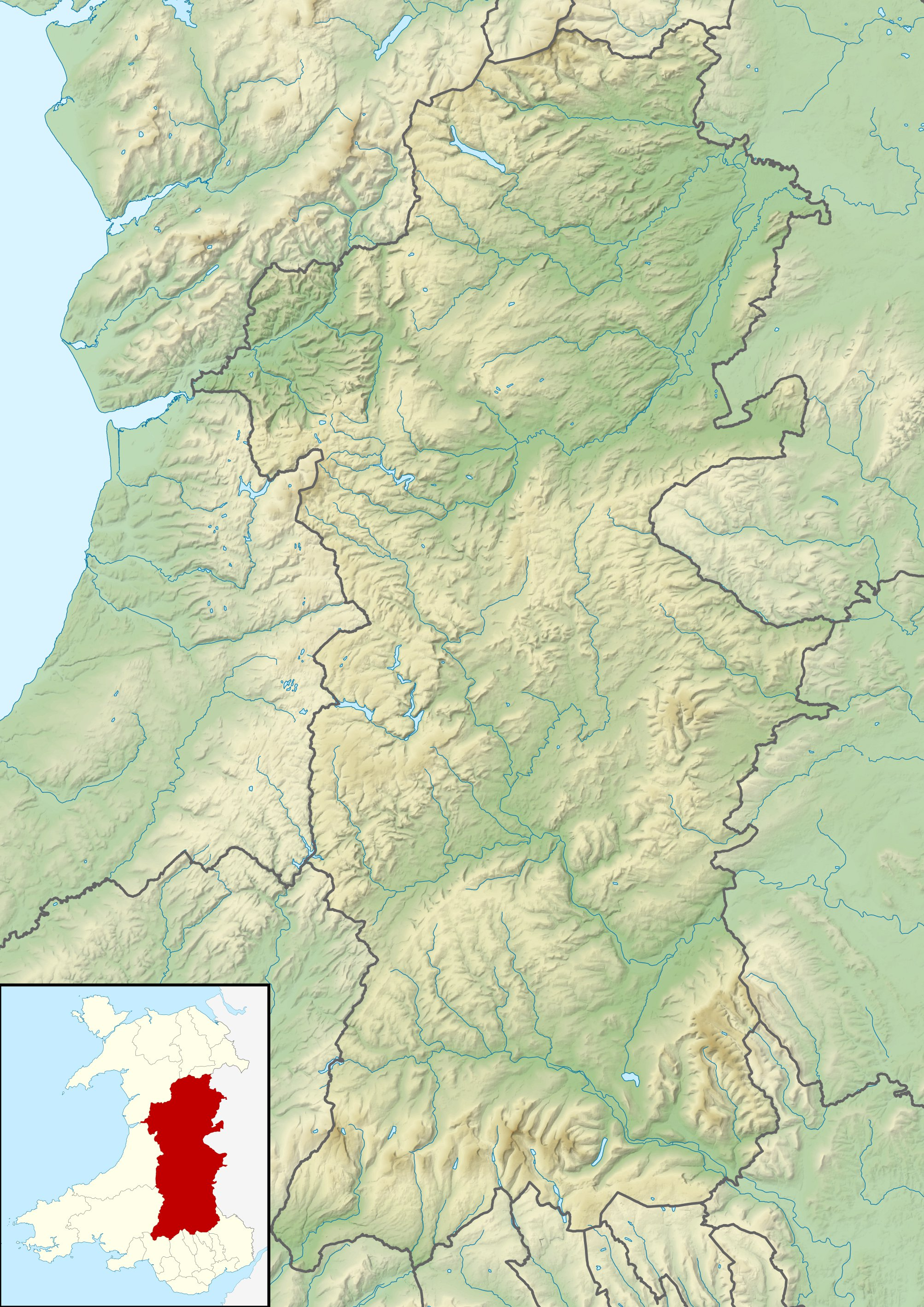
- Location within Powys
- 52.2313°N 3.1218°W
- Type: House
- Location: Old Radnor, Powys, Wales

History
- Built: 16th–19th centuries

Site notes
- Architect: John Nash for the demolished main block
- Architectural styles: Tudor Revival for the remnant, Neoclassical for the demolished main block
- Governing body: Privately owned

Listed Building – Grade II
- Official name: Harpton Court
- Designated: 13 December 1951
- Reference no.: 9176

Listed Building – Grade II
- Official name: Lodge at former north drive to Harpton Court
- Designated: 21 November 1988
- Reference no.: 9174

Listed Building – Grade II
- Official name: Gate Piers, walls and railings at former north drive to Harpton Court
- Designated: 21 November 1988
- Reference no.: 9175

Listed Building – Grade II
- Official name: Former stable block to stable-yard at Harpton Court
- Designated: 15 February 1993
- Reference no.: 9177

Cadw/ICOMOS Register of Parks and Gardens of Special Historic Interest in Wales
- Official name: Harpton Court
- Designated: 1 February 2022; 4 years ago
- Reference no.: PGW(Po)59(POW)
- Listing: Grade II

Harpton Court, Old Radnor, Powys, is a Tudor Revival house dating from the late 19th century. It originally formed the north-west wing to a much larger Neoclassical mansion, which was reconstructed by John Nash in the early 19th century, but the main part of the court was demolished in 1956. The house was the ancestral home of the Lewis family, whose most prominent member, George Cornewall Lewis, served as Chancellor of the Exchequer and Home Secretary under Lord Palmerston. The court remains a private house and is a Grade II listed building. Its gardens and grounds are listed on the Cadw/ICOMOS Register of Parks and Gardens of Special Historic Interest in Wales.

== History ==
The Lewis family had owned land in Radnorshire since the 16th century, the earliest recorded presence being of Thomas Lewis (1518/1519 – 1607) who was Sheriff in 1547. (Note: The Lewis family archive, with records dating from 1541 to 1910, is held at the National Library of Wales.) He also served as the Member of Parliament for Radnor from 1545 to 1553, and for Radnorshire from 1559 to 1567 and 1584–1587. The family continued as local landowners and minor politicians until Thomas Frankland Lewis (1780–1855) who held the office of Chairman of the Poor Law Commission and gained a baronetcy. His son, George Cornewall Lewis (1806–1863) gained far greater prominence, serving as Chancellor of the Exchequer, Home Secretary and Secretary of State for War in the administrations of Lord Palmerston. Occasionally suggested as an alternative to William Gladstone as Palmerston's political heir, his career was cut short by his early death at the age of 56. (Note: George Cornewall Lewis is commemorated by a "striking monument" in New Radnor. Designed by John Gibbs, architect of the Banbury Cross, and with sculpture by William Forsyth, it has a Grade II* listing.)

In 1910, the Harpton Court estate passed by inheritance to Cosmo Duff-Gordon, who two years later, together with his wife, Lucy, survived the sinking of the Titanic. The Duff-Gordons continued in residence until the death of Sir Henry William Duff-Gordon in 1953. The house was then sold, and the main block demolished shortly afterwards. In 2013 the remaining wing of the house was marketed for sale.

== Architecture and description ==
The main block of the court was designed in the mid-18th century, and redeveloped by John Nash in the early 19th century. Considered one of Powys' finest neoclassical buildings, it was demolished in 1956. The remaining wing of Harpton Court is a Grade II listed building. The elaborate gates, and attached lodge, which originally flanked the main drive to the house down an avenue of lime trees, are also listed at Grade II, as are the stable block and former granary. The gardens, including a largely intact walled kitchen garden are listed at Grade II on the Cadw/ICOMOS Register of Parks and Gardens of Special Historic Interest in Wales. The gardens contained specimens of Heracleum mantegazzianum (Giant Hogweed), reputedly introduced by Gertrude Jekyll, a friend of the Lewis family, but these have been removed in the 21st century.

== Gallery ==
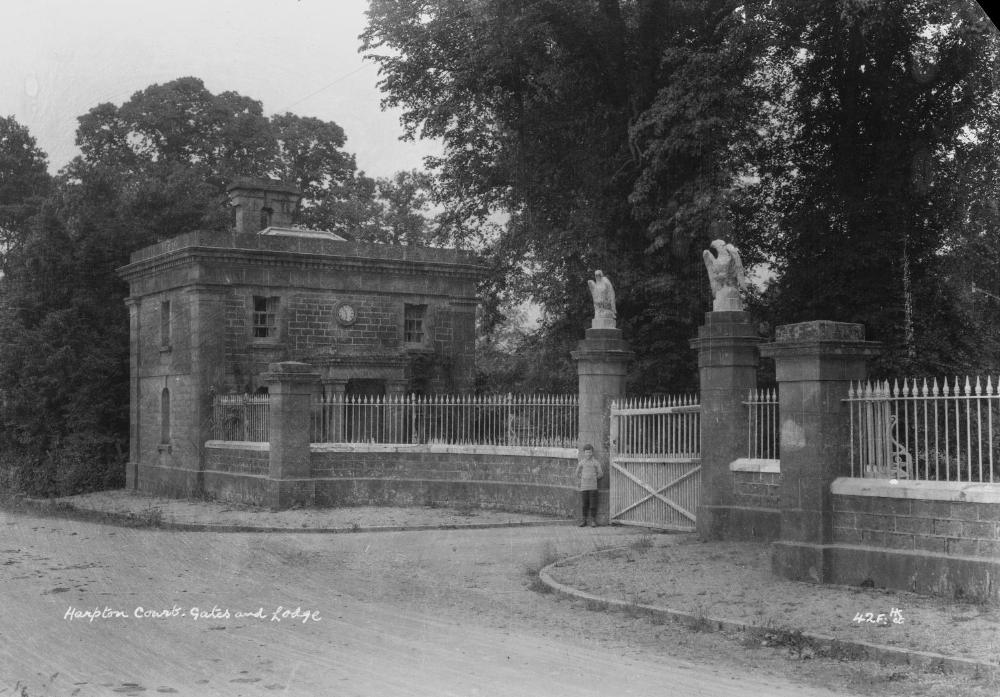
Lodge at the head of the main drive circa. 1910

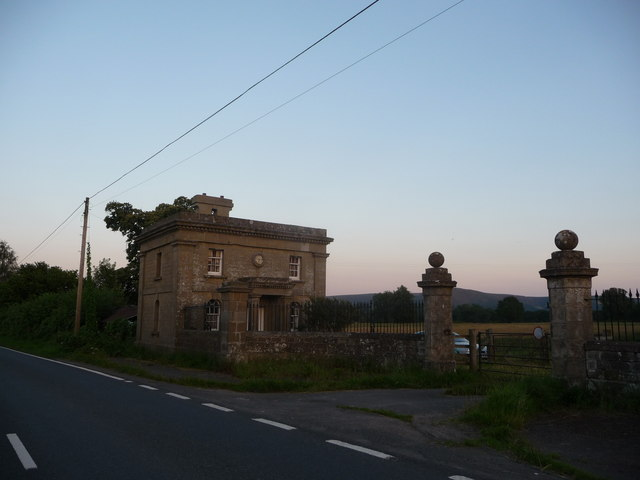
The lodge in 2012

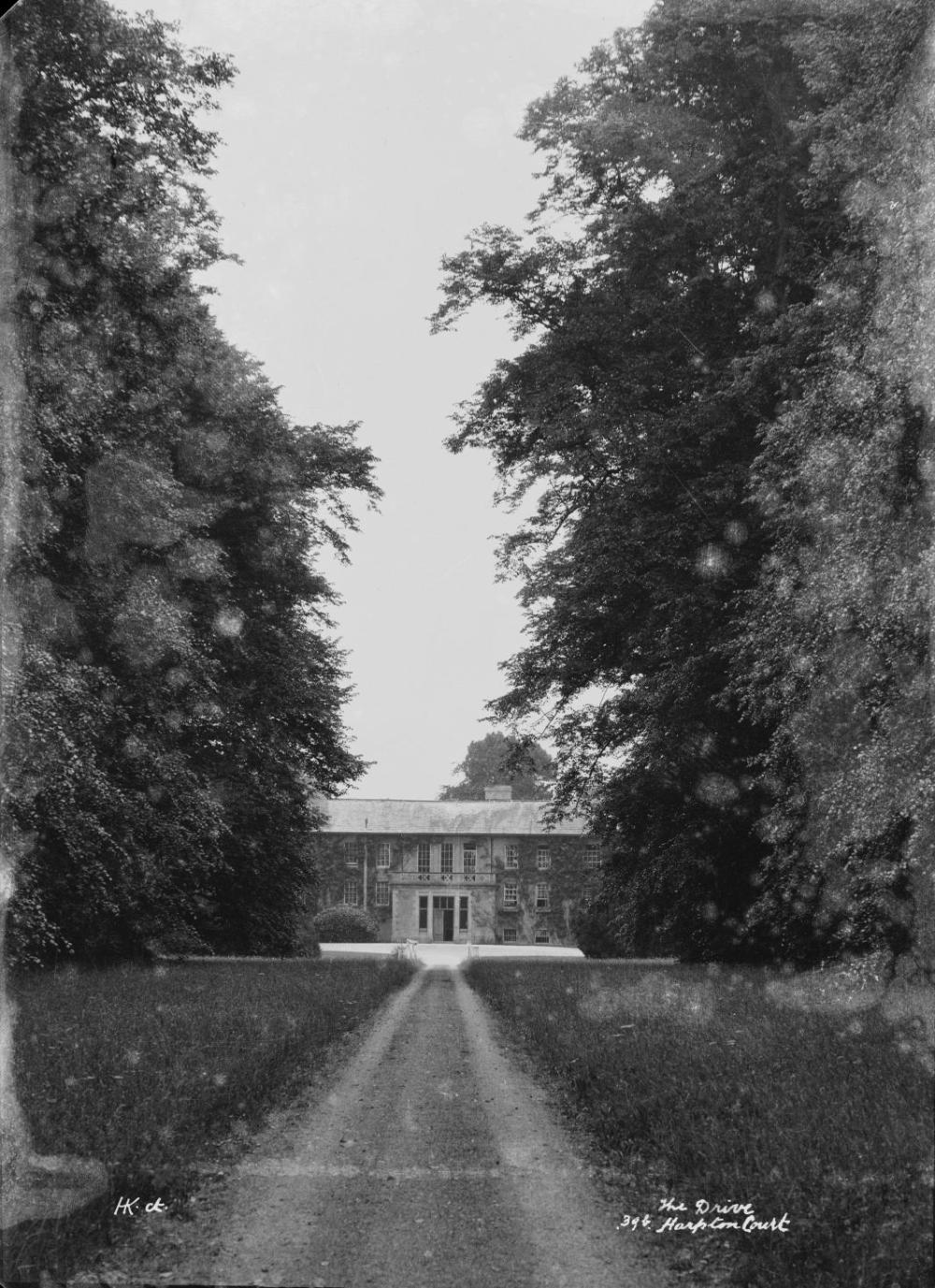
The lime avenue

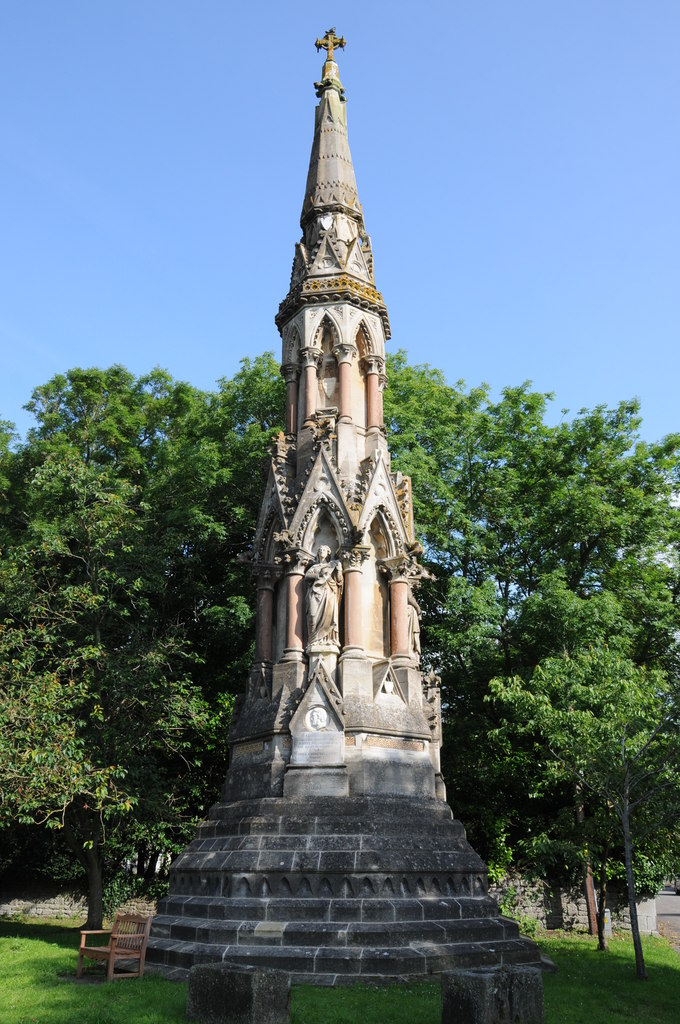
Monument to George Cornewall Lewis at New Radnor

== Sources ==
- Knott, John (1986). Popular Opposition to 1834 Poor Law. Abingdon-on-Thames, UK: Croom Helm. ISBN 978-0-709-91532-4.
- Scourfield, Robert; Haslam, Richard (2013). Powys: Montgomeryshire, Radnorshire and Breconshire. The Buildings of Wales. New Haven, US and London: Yale University Press. ISBN 978-0-300-18508-9. Archived from the original on 5 September 2021.
