= Frances King (philanthropist) =

English philanthropist and author

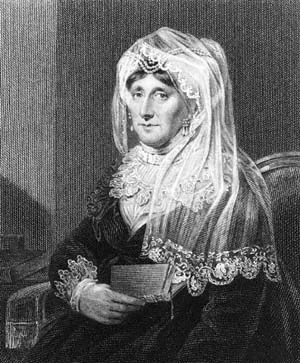
- Born: Frances Elizabeth Bernard; July 25, 1757; Lincoln, England
- Died: 31 August 1821 (aged 64)
- Occupations: Philanthropist and author
- Organization(s): Society for Bettering the Condition of and Improving the Comforts of the Poor (SBCP)
- Known for: Founding schools and libraries in her husband's parishes, and those of her sons-in-law. Also wrote multiple Christian works, both fiction and non-fiction
- Notable work: The Rector's Memorandum Book (novel); A Tour in France; Female Scripture Characters
- Spouse: Reverend Richard King
- Children: 4
- Parents: Sir Francis Bernard, 1st Baronet (father); Dame Amelia Offley (mother)
- Relatives: Brothers: Sir Thomas Bernard, 3rd Baronet; Scrope Bernard-Morland, 4th Baronet

Frances "Fanny" King, née Bernard (25 July 1757 – 23 December 1821) was an English philanthropist and author. Her father, Sir Francis Bernard, 1st Baronet, was Governor of the Provinces of New Jersey and Massachusetts in America, though Frances was born and remained in England. She had four children, after which she assisted her brother Thomas with his philanthropic work, and then herself became involved in founding schools and libraries in the parishes where her husband served. After her brother's death she continued to involve herself in projects to assist the poor. Three of her grandchildren were also well-known: Admiral Richard Collinson, one of the naval officers searching for the lost Franklin Expedition in the arctic; the writer Lady Julia Cecilia Stretton; and the engineer Thomas Bernard Collinson.

== Life ==
Frances Elizabeth Bernard was born in Lincoln, England, the eighth child of Sir Francis Bernard and his wife Amelia, née Offley. Among her siblings was Sir Thomas Bernard, 3rd Baronet, who was also involved in many philanthropic projects.

Her father Francis Bernard became in 1758 Governor of the Province of New Jersey in America and moved there with his family and four of her siblings. He later became Governor of the Province of Massachusetts Bay. But Frances, who was apparently regarded as delicate, remained in England with relatives and was not reunited with her family until their return in 1769.

In 1782, Frances married the Reverend Richard King by whom she was to have four children, of whom two died in childhood. Apart from this, until her eldest daughter Amelia married Reverend John Collinson in 1802, her life at this period was uneventful. Richard King was rector of the parishes of Steeple Morden in Cambridgeshire and Worthen in Shropshire from 1782 until his death in 1810. She lived with her husband in both parishes, where she started schools for poor children and societies for assisting the poor.

In the same year, King began to assist her brother Thomas in the development of the "Society for Bettering the Condition of and Improving the Comforts of the Poor" (SBCP) based in Clapham, London. She was also involved in founding schools and libraries in her husband's parishes, and at this time became acquainted with the philanthropist Hannah More. Following her husband's death in 1810, King moved to Gateshead where her daughters' husbands were clergymen, and continued to involve herself in works for the poor, including sick funds and the provision of clothing. She died in Gateshead in 1821. Among her many grandchildren, by Amelia (King) Collinson were the explorer Admiral Richard Collinson and two of his siblings, the writer Lady Julia Cecilia Stretton, and engineer Thomas Bernard Collinson.

== Works ==
In 1774, Frances Bernard wrote The Rector's Memorandum Book, a sermonizing novel (not published until 1814 under her married name) which, in the words of her biographer Mary Clare Martin, depicts "[an] exemplary Christian heroine...educating all the children in the village and nursing the sick. Forced to make an unhappy marriage, she [dies] a pious and early death."

Her first published work was A Tour in France (1808), based on a journal made during an eight-month stay in France after the death of her daughter Elizabeth in 1801. Other works included The Beneficial Effects of the Christian Temper on Domestic Happiness (1809) and Female Scripture Characters; Exemplifying Female Virtues, first published in 1811 and which became widely used in schools; by 1833 it reached its twelfth edition.

== Sources ==
- Martin, Mary Clare. "King [née Bernard], Frances Elizabeth [Fanny]". Oxford Dictionary of National Biography (online ed.). Oxford University Press. doi:10.1093/ref:odnb/15561. (Subscription, Wikipedia Library access or UK public library membership required.)
- Colbert, Benjamin (n.d.). "British Travel Writers: Frances Elizabeth [Fanny] King". University of Wolverhampton.
- Pencak, William. "Bernard, Sir Francis, first baronet". Oxford Dictionary of National Biography (online ed.). Oxford University Press. doi:10.1093/ref:odnb/2242. (Subscription, Wikipedia Library access or UK public library membership required.)
- Sheldon, R. D. "Bernard, Sir Thomas, third baronet". Oxford Dictionary of National Biography (online ed.). Oxford University Press. doi:10.1093/ref:odnb/2251. (Subscription, Wikipedia Library access or UK public library membership required.)
