= Noel Phillips =

Welsh cricketer and British Army officer

Personal information
- Full name: Noel Clive Phillips
- Born: 30 July 1883; Newport, Monmouthshire, Wales
- Died: 15 August 1961 (aged 78); Colwall, Herefordshire, England
- Batting: Right-handed
- Relatives: Frank Phillips (brother); Gerald Phillips (brother)

Domestic team information
- Years: Team
- 1908: Marylebone Cricket Club
- 1901–1924: Monmouthshire

Career statistics
Competition	First-class
Matches	6
Runs scored	188
Batting average	17.09
100s/50s	0/1
Top score	62
Catches/stumpings	4/–
- Source: Cricinfo, 24 October 2018

Noel Clive Phillips DSO, MC (30 July 1883 – 15 August 1961) was a Welsh first-class cricketer and British Army officer. Phillips played minor counties cricket for Monmouthshire between the early 1900s and the early 1920s. He also made appearances at first-class level for Marylebone Cricket Club, Free Foresters Cricket Club and South Wales. Phillips served in the militia battalion of the Loyal North Lancashire Regiment from 1901, reaching the rank of lieutenant before resigning his commission. He returned to the regiment to resume his commission during the First World War. During the course of the war he received the Military Cross, Distinguished Service Order and a Mention in Dispatches as well as promotion to the acting rank of lieutenant-colonel. Phillips served as High Sheriff of Radnorshire from 1936 to 1939 and as deputy lieutenant of the county from 1943.

== Personal life ==
Born at Newport on 30 July 1883, Phillips was educated at Marlborough College. He was one of three candidates nominated for the position of High Sheriff of Radnorshire on Saint Martin's Day (11 November) 1936 and again on the same day in 1937. He was appointed to the position on 15 March 1938, during this time residing at Greenways in Penybont. He was appointed a deputy lieutenant for the county on 11 January 1943. Phillips died at Colwall in England in August 1961.

== Cricket career ==
Phillips made his debut in minor counties cricket for Monmouthshire against Wiltshire at Rodney Parade in the 1901 Minor Counties Championship. Phillips did not feature for the county in 1902, but played regularly in the 1903 and 1904 seasons, after which a gap of four years followed before he next appeared for Monmouthshire. He made his debut in first-class cricket in 1908, when he played for the Marylebone Cricket Club (MCC) against Cambridge University at Fenner's, one of two first-class matches he played for the MCC that year, the other coming against Oxford University. After playing for Monmouthshire in 1908, another gap of four years followed before his next appearance in minor counties cricket. He made three further appearances in first-class cricket in 1912, playing twice for the Free Foresters against the two Oxbridge Universities, as well as appearing for South Wales against the touring South Africans at Swansea. With World War I interrupting county cricket, Phillips resumed playing cricket after the war. He appeared in minor counties cricket for Monmouthshire in 1921 and 1924, having made a total of 43 appearances for the county in minor counties cricket by that point. He also appeared once more in first-class cricket, playing for the Free Foresters against Oxford University in 1921. Playing six matches at first-class level, Phillips scored 188 runs at an average of 17.09. He made one half century, a score of 62 against Oxford University in 1912.

== Military career ==
Phillips was commissioned as a second lieutenant in the third (militia) battalion of the Loyal North Lancashire Regiment on 24 August 1901. He was promoted to the local rank of lieutenant on 16 March 1902 and this was confirmed as a substantive rank on 8 June 1903. At some point thereafter he resigned from the army. Phillips returned to the battalion (which had since become a Special Reserve unit) after the outbreak of the First World War and resumed his commission as a lieutenant in the third battalion on 8 January 1915. He was promoted to captain on 13 February 1915 and to the temporary rank of major on 3 April 1916.

Phillips was awarded the Military Cross for gallantry on the battlefield on 3 June 1916. Phillips was later appointed to command his battalion and was promoted to the acting rank of lieutenant-colonel on 27 September 1916. On 9 April 1917 he was mentioned in despatches by Field Marshal Sir Douglas Haig and on 4 June was appointed a companion of the Distinguished Service Order. The third battalion was transferred to the training reserve on 22 September 1918 with Phillips retaining command and his acting rank until 9 January 1919 after which he reverted to his substantive rank of captain. Phillips relinquished his commission on 1 April 1920 and on doing so was promoted to the rank of lieutenant-colonel.
