= Monaughty House =

House in Llangunllo, Wales

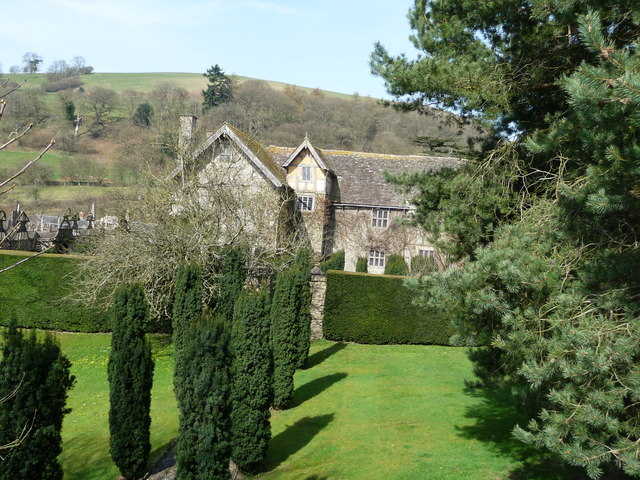

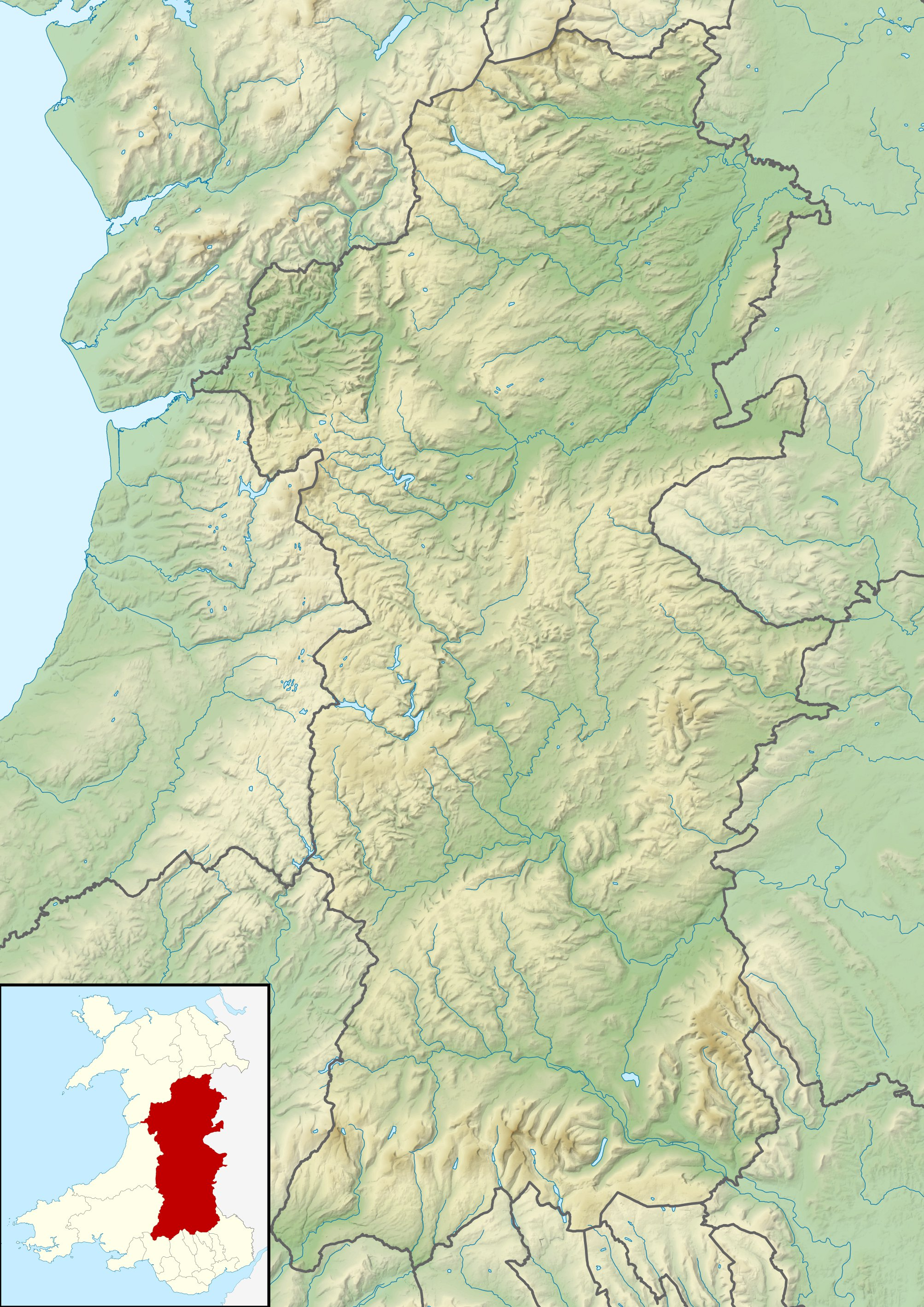
- Location within Powys
- 52.31°N 3.119°W
- Location: Llangunllo, Powys, Wales

History
- Built: c.1565

Site notes
- Architectural style: Vernacular
- Governing body: Privately owned

Listed Building – Grade I
- Official name: Monaughty House
- Designated: 24 October 1951
- Reference no.: 9126

Monaughty House (or Mynachdy, Welsh for 'Monastery') stands in the community of Llangunllo, Powys, Wales. Dating from c. 1565, it is one of the oldest stone-built houses in the county and a Grade I listed building.

== History ==
Monaughty House stands south-east of the village of Llangunllo in the eastern part of Powys, close to the border with England. The house was built in the mid-16th century for the Price family, local landowners who served as high sheriffs and members of Parliament for the historic county of Radnorshire in the 16th and 17th centuries. (Note: The Price family fortune, and its position in Radnorshire society, had been secured by James's grandfather, also James, who leased the Monaughty grange in 1529 and bought it outright in 1550, following the Dissolution.) (Note: The Prices claimed descent from the hereditary Princes of Wales and achieved almost complete dominance over Radnorshire politics in the 16th and 17th centuries, fifteen members of the family serving as High Sheriff, and as county members in twelve parliaments and borough members in seven.) James Price, the builder of the house, was a beneficiary of the dissolution of the monasteries, Monaughty was built on the site of a grange belonging to Cwmhir Abbey. Peter Smith notes that further work was undertaken in the 1630s, including the creation of a staircase leading off the central hall.

Monaughty is a private house and is not open to the public. In the 20th–21st centuries, its owners have undertaken an extensive programme of restoration.

== Architecture and description ==
Monaughty House was built to a traditional U-plan, with a central hall and two projecting wings; it is one of the earliest houses in Powys to have been built in stone. Above the hall, and accessed via a stair turret, is an "impressively large" great chamber. Robert Scourfield and Richard Haslam, in their Powys volume in the Buildings of Wales series, describe it as "one of the best houses of its type in Wales". The interior contains plasterwork with the coat of arms of Elizabeth I. Monaughty House is a Grade I listed building.

== Sources ==
- Scourfield, Robert; Haslam, Richard (2013). Powys: Montgomeryshire, Radnorshire and Breconshire. The Buildings of Wales. New Haven and London: Yale University Press. ISBN 978-0-300-18508-9.
- Smith, Peter (1988). Houses of the Welsh Countryside. London: Her Majesty's Stationery Office. ISBN 0-11-700475-8. OCLC 868639211.
- Suggett, Richard (2005). Houses & History in the March of Wales: Radnorshire 1400–1800. Aberystwyth: Royal Commission on the Ancient and Historical Monuments of Wales. ISBN 978-1-871-18423-5.
