= Fowler baronets =

Set index for Fowler baronets

Four baronetcies have been created in the surname of Fowler, two in the Baronetage of England and two in the Baronetage of the United Kingdom. All are now extinct.

- Fowler baronets of Islington (1628)
- Fowler baronets of Harnage Grange (1704)
- Fowler baronets of Gastard House (1885)
- Fowler baronets of Braemore (1890)
