= Frances King =

Frances King may refer to:

- Frances King (philanthropist) (1757–1821)
- Frances King (cricketer) (1980–2003)
