= John Bradshaw (died 1588) =

Politician

John Bradshaw (by 1519 – May 1588), of Presteigne, Radnorshire and St Dogmaels, Pembrokeshire, was an English-Welsh politician.

== Family ==
Bradshaw was the eldest son of MP for Ludlow, John Bradshaw. By 1539, Bradshaw had married Margaret née Vaughan, a daughter of Roger Vaughan of Clyro, Radnorshire. They had one son, James, who predeceased him, leaving Bradshaw's grandson, also named John, as his heir. His second wife was Elizabeth née Gerard, a daughter of William Gerard of Chester, Cheshire, and who represented Chester as MP. Bradshaw and Elizabeth had six sons.

== Career ==
He was a Member (MP) of the Parliament of England for Radnorshire in April 1554.

Parliament of England
Preceded by Charles Vaughan	Member of Parliament for Radnorshire; April 1554	Succeeded by John Knill
