= Thomas Harley =

Thomas Harley may refer to:

- Thomas Harley (of Kinsham) (c. 1667–1738), English lawyer, diplomat and politician
- Thomas Harley (politician, born 1730) (1730–1804), British politician
- Tom Harley (born 1978), Australian rules footballer
- Thomas Harley (ice hockey) (born 2001), American-Canadian ice hockey player
