= Frank Phillips (cricketer) =

Welsh cricketer

Personal information
- Full name: Francis Ashley Phillips
- Born: 11 April 1873; Monmouthshire, Wales
- Died: 5 March 1955 (aged 81); Kingsland, Herefordshire, England
- Batting: Right-handed
- Bowling: Right-arm medium
- Relatives: Gerald Phillips (brother); Noel Phillips (brother)

Domestic team information
- Years: Team
- 1892–1895: Oxford University
- 1896: MCC
- 1897–1911: Somerset
- 1890–1899: Monmouthshire
- FC debut: 19 May 1892 Oxford University v Gentlemen of England
- Last FC: 15 August 1919 HK Foster's XI v Worcestershire

Career statistics
Competition	First-class
Matches	108
Runs scored	4,310
Batting average	23.17
100s/50s	4/25
Top score	163
Balls bowled	481
Wickets	7
Bowling average	55.71
5 wickets in innings	0
10 wickets in match	0
Best bowling	2/8
Catches/stumpings	65/2
- Source: CricketArchive, 7 May 2010

Francis Ashley Phillips (11 April 1873 – 5 March 1955) was a Welsh cricketer who played 108 first-class cricket matches in his career between 1892 and 1919. He was educated at Rossall School and Exeter College, Oxford. A right-handed batsman and right-arm medium pace bowler, who occasionally kept wicket, Phillips scored 4,310 first-class runs. He played the majority of his career for Somerset, but also represented the county of his birth, Monmouthshire in second-class cricket.
