= James Price (of Pilleth) =

Welsh politician

James Price (1571 – 6 January 1641) was a Welsh politician who sat in the House of Commons from 1624 to 1626.

Price was the son of John Price (John ap Rys) of Pileth, an officer in the wars of Queen Elizabeth, and educated at the Middle Temple (1588) and Brasenose College, Oxford (1589).

Price was High Sheriff of Radnorshire in 1601 and 1613. In 1624, he was elected Member of Parliament for Radnorshire. He was re-elected MP for Radnorshire in 1625 and 1626.

He married Elizabeth, the daughter of (?Eustace) Whitney of Whitney, Herefordshire; they had 6 sons and 4 daughters.

Parliament of England
| Preceded by James Price | Member of Parliament for Radnorshire; 1624–1626 | Succeeded by Richard Jones |
