= Lewis baronets of Harpton Court (1846) =

Escutcheon of the Lewis baronets of Harpton Court

The Lewis baronetcy, of Harpton Court in the County of Radnor, was created in the Baronetage of the United Kingdom on 11 July 1846 for the politician Thomas Frankland Lewis. His son, the 2nd Baronet, was a cabinet minister who served as both Chancellor of the Exchequer and Home Secretary. The title became extinct on the death of the 4th Baronet in 1911.

== Lewis baronets, of Harpton Court (1846) ==
- Sir Thomas Frankland Lewis, 1st Baronet (1780–1855)
- Sir George Cornewall Lewis, 2nd Baronet (1806–1863)
- Sir Gilbert Frankland Lewis, 3rd Baronet (1808–1883)
- Sir Herbert Edmund Frankland Lewis, 4th Baronet (1846–1911)
