= Walter Price (MP) =

16th-century Welsh politician

Walter Price (fl. 1571), of Monaughty, Radnorshire, was a Welsh politician.

He was a member (MP) of the parliament of England for Radnorshire in 1571.
