= Julia Cecilia Stretton =

British novelist

- Born: 25 November 1812
- Died: 17 July 1878
- Occupation: Novelist
- Spouse: Walter Wilkins
- Children: 3
- Father: John Collinson

Julia Cecilia Stretton (25 November 1812 – 17 July 1878) was an English novelist.

Julia Cecilia Collinson was born on 25 November 1812, the second daughter of ten daughters and five sons of the Reverend John Collinson, rector of Gateshead. Her siblings included Admiral Richard Collinson and Major General Thomas Bernard Collinson.

In 1831, she married Walter Wilkins, MP for Radnorshire from 1835 to 1840. In 1839, they changed their names to Walter and Julia de Winton. They had two sons and a daughter before he died in 1840. In 1857, she married William Richard Stretton, who died in 1868.

Her first publication was a children's book called The Lonely Island In 1852. She went on to publish a number of novels, including Margaret and Her Bridesmaids (1856) and The Valley of a Hundred Fires (1860). She also contributed two stories to Somebody's Luggage (1862), a Christmas issue of Charles Dickens' periodical All the Year Round.

Julia Cecilia Stretton died on 17 July 1878.

== Bibliography ==
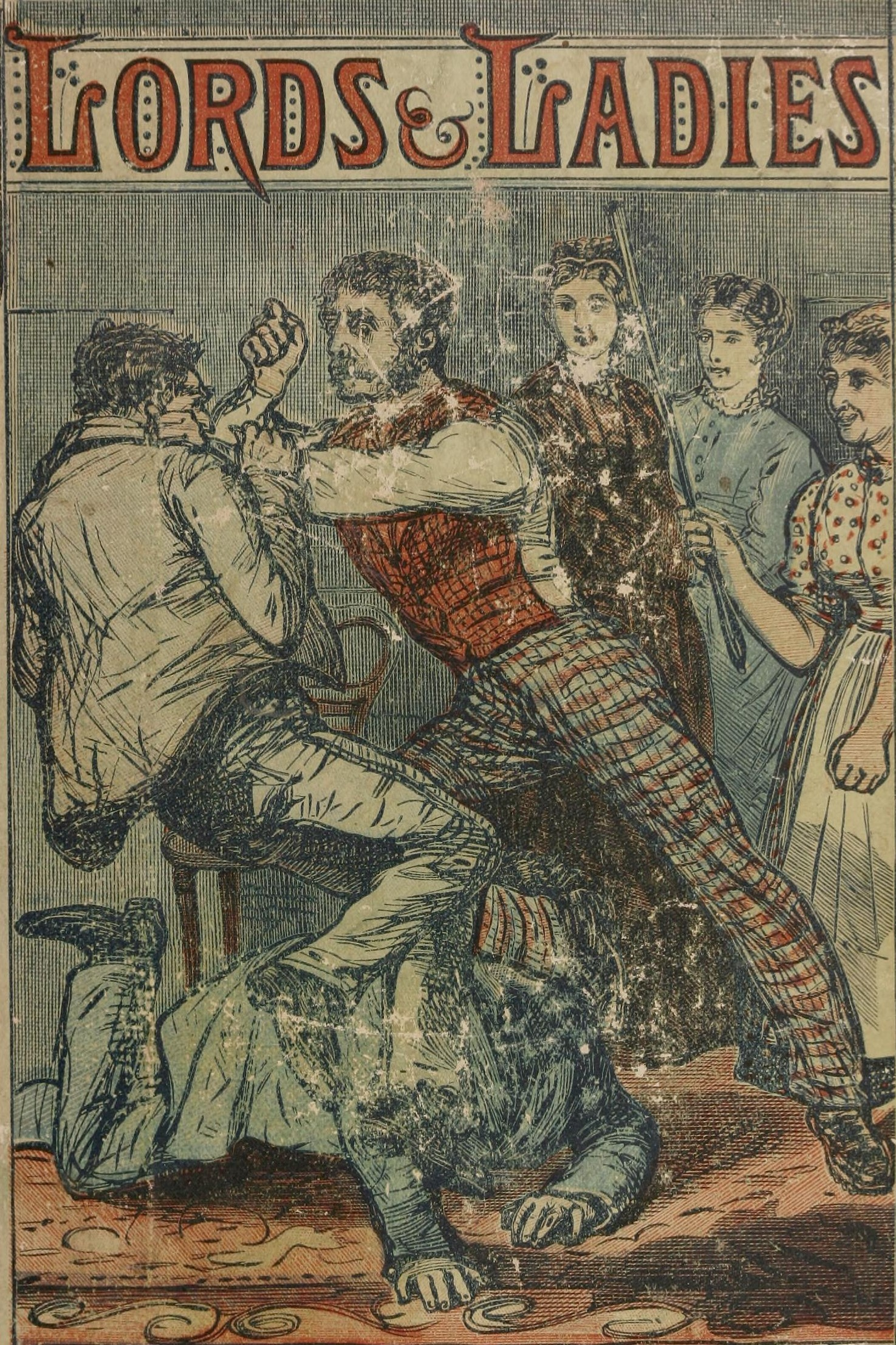
1876 Yellow-back cover of Lords and Ladies

- Yr Ynys Unyg: or, The Lonely Island. A Narrative for Young People. 1 vol. London: Simpkin, 1852.
- Woman's Devotion: A Novel. 3 vol. London: Hurst and Blackett, 1855.
- Margaret and Her Bridesmaids. 3 vol. London: Hurst and Blackett, 1856.
- The Lady of Glynne. 3 vol. London: Hurst and Blackett, 1857.
- Mr. and Mrs. Asheton. 3 vol. London: Hurst and Blackett, 1860.
- The Valley of a Hundred Fires. 3 vol. London: Hurst and Blackett, 1860.
- The Ladies of Lovel-Leigh. 3 vol. London: Hurst and Blackett, 1862.
- The Queen of the County. 3 vol. London: Hurst and Blackett, 1864.
- The Pemberton Family. 3 vol. London: Hurst and Blackett, 1865.
- Lords and Ladies. 3 vol. London: Hurst and Blackett, 1866.
- Three Wives. 3 vol. London: Hurst and Blackett, 1868.
- A Book of Heroines. 3 vol. London: Hurst and Blackett, 1869.
