= Sir Richard Fowler, 2nd Baronet =

English politician

Sir Richard Fowler, 2nd Baronet (1681–1731), of Harnage Grange, Shropshire was an English politician.

== Life ==
He was the eldest son of Sir William Fowler, 1st Baronet and his wife Mary Cotton, daughter of Sir Robert Cotton, 1st Baronet, of Combermere.

Fowler was a Member (MP) of the Parliament of Great Britain for Radnorshire, from 1715 to 1722.

== Family ==
Fowler married Sarah Sloane, daughter of William Sloane and niece of Sir Hans Sloane. They had two sons and a daughter:

- Sir William Fowler, 3rd Baronet (1718–1746)
- Sir Hans Fowler, 5th Baronet (died 1773), last of the Fowler baronets of Harnage Grange.
- Sarah Fowler (died 1799), married Col. Hodges (John Hodges of Brook Street, died 1768), grandmother through her daughter Sarah, who married George Hastings, of Hans Francis Hastings, 12th Earl of Huntingdon. Her son and co-heir Thomas Hodges changed his surname to Fowler.

Parliament of Great Britain
Preceded by Thomas Harley	Member of Parliament for Radnorshire; 1715–1722	Succeeded by Sir Humphrey Howorth
Baronetage of England
Preceded by William Fowler	Baronet (of Harnage Grange); 1717–1731	Succeeded by William Fowler
