= Fowler baronets of Harnage Grange (1704) =

Escutcheon of the Fowler baronets of Harnage Grange

The Fowler baronetcy of Harnage Grange in the County of Salop was created in the Baronetage of England on 1 November 1704 for William Fowler. He was the son of Richard Fowler of Harnage Grange and his wife Margaret Newport, daughter of Richard Newport, 1st Baron Newport.

The title became extinct on the death in 1771 of the 5th Baronet died in 1771.

== Fowler of Harnage Grange (1704) ==
- William Fowler, 1st Baronet (died 1717)
- Richard Fowler, 2nd Baronet (died 1731)
- William Fowler, 3rd Baronet (1718–1746)
- William Fowler, 4th Baronet (died 1760)
- Hans Fowler, 5th Baronet (died 1773), as his father had been, an army officer in the Prussian service. He left no heir.
