= George Gwynne =

English politician (1623–1673)

George Gwynne (c. 1623 – 1673) was a Welsh politician who sat in the House of Commons at various times between 1654 and 1660.

Gwynne was the son of David Gwynne and his wife Joan Morgan daughter of George Morgan of Itton, Monmouthshire. He inherited Pencoyd Castle Monmouthshire from his uncle Christopher Morgan. In April 1654, he was elected Member of Parliament for Radnorshire in the First Protectorate Parliament. He was a J P for Radnorshire in 1655. In 1656, he was re-elected MP for Radnorshire for the Second Protectorate Parliament.

In 1660, Gwynne was re-elected MP for Radnorshire in the Convention Parliament. He was one of those nominated for the Knight of the Royal Oak award in 1660. He was listed as one of the Justices of the Peace for Breconshire in 1666.

Parliament of England
Preceded by Not represented in Barebones Parliament	Member of Parliament for Radnorshire; 1654–1656; With: Henry Williams	Succeeded by Henry Williams
