= Richard Williams (died 1692) =

Welsh politician (c. 1654–1692)

Richard Williams (c. 1654 – September 1692), of Cabalfa, Clyro, Radnorshire, was a Welsh politician.

He was a Member (MP) of the Parliament of England for Radnorshire in 1677, 1685 and 1690–1692, for Breconshire in 1679 and 1681, and for New Radnor Boroughs in 1689.
