= Henry Williams (MP for Radnorshire) =

Welsh politician

Henry Williams was a Welsh politician who sat in the House of Commons between 1654 and 1659.

Williams was the son of Robert Williams of Caehalfa and probably the grandson of Sir David Williams of Gwernyfed. He was High Sheriff of Breconshire in 1639 and High Sheriff of Radnorshire in 1649.

In 1654, Williams was elected Member of Parliament for Radnorshire for the First Protectorate Parliament. He was re-elected MP for Radnorshire in 1656 for the Second Protectorate Parliament and again in 1659 for the Third Protectorate Parliament. In 1662 Williams came to Cathedine in Breconshire and became High Sheriff of Breconshire again.

Williams married Mayzod Evans, widow of Leisan Evans of Gnoll, Neath and daughter of judge David Jenkins of Hensol Glamorgan.

Parliament of England
Preceded by Not represented in Barebones Parliament	Member of Parliament for Radnorshire; 1654–1659; With: George Gwynne 1654–1656	Succeeded by Not represented in Restored Rump
