= Thomas Frankland Lewis =

British Poor Law Commissioner and Tory MP

The Right Honourable Sir Thomas Frankland Lewis Bt
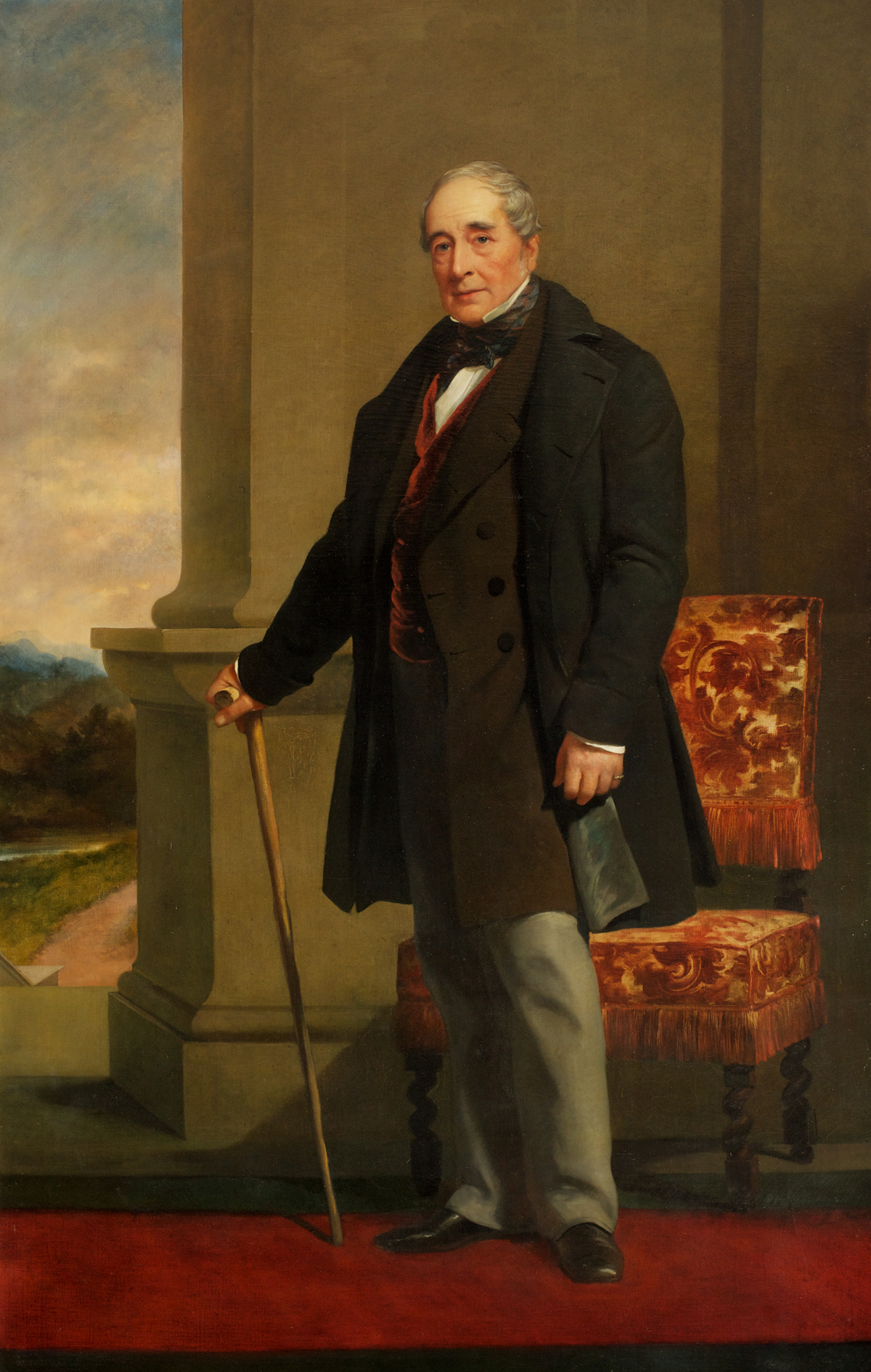
- Sir Thomas Frankland Lewis, 1854 painting
- Born: 14 May 1780; Britain
- Died: 22 January 1855 (aged 74)
- Occupation: Politician

Sir Thomas Frankland Lewis, 1st Baronet (14 May 1780 – 22 January 1855) was a British Poor Law Commissioner and moderate Tory (later Peelite) MP.

== Early life ==
Lewis was the son of John Lewis and Anne Frankland, daughter of Sir Thomas Frankland, 5th Baronet. Born in Great Ormond Street, London, he was educated at Eton College, and attended Christ Church, Oxford without taking a degree. His father died in 1797.

== Parliamentarian ==
Lewis was an improving landlord of the family estates in Radnorshire, and was appointed High Sheriff of Radnorshire for 1804–05. He was ambitious to enter national politics as a Member of Parliament, which he did in 1812 as a follower of Lord Bulkeley, at Beaumaris.

Lewis was an MP for most years between 1812 and 1855, for Ennis (1826–1828), for Radnorshire (1828–1834) and for Radnor Boroughs (1847–1855). Initially he was known as a Grenvillite; while he supported the landowner and agricultural interest, his sympathy with Catholic emancipation made him unacceptable to the Tory ministry. From 1821 onwards he took the advice of Lord Grenville to establish himself by means of public commission work.

He was elected a Fellow of the Royal Society in 1820.

== Commissioner ==
On 24 June 1824, Lewis was appointed to the Royal Commission for inquiring into the nature and extent of the Instruction afforded by the several Institutions in Ireland established for the purpose of Education where he served with the other Commissioners: John Leslie Foster, William Grant, James Glassford and Anthony Richard Blake.

As chairman (1834–1839) of the Poor Law Commission, he immediately clashed with Edwin Chadwick, who had been the driving force for Poor Law reform. Chadwick was Secretary, not (as he had hoped) on the Board itself; and Lewis with George Nicholls and John Shaw-Lefevre proceeded to overrule his views.

Lewis chaired the commission on the Rebecca Riots, and the subsequent commission that abolished the turnpike trusts. He was created a baronet in 1846.

== Family ==
He married Harriet Cornewall, a daughter of Sir George Cornewall, 2nd Baronet and Catherine Cornewall. Their family home was Harpton Court, Old Radnor. They had two children:

- George Cornewall Lewis (21 April 1806 – 13 April 1863).
- Gilbert Frankland Lewis (21 July 1808 – 18 December 1883).

Parliament of the United Kingdom
Preceded by Sir Edward Lloyd, Bt	Member of Parliament for Beaumaris; 1812–1826	Succeeded by Sir Robert Williams, Bt
Preceded by Richard Wellesley	Member of Parliament for Ennis; 1826–1828	Succeeded by William Smith O'Brien
Preceded by Walter Wilkins	Member of Parliament for Radnorshire; 1828–1835	Succeeded by Walter Wilkins
Preceded by Richard Price	Member of Parliament for Radnor; 1847–1855	Succeeded by Sir George Cornewall Lewis, Bt
Political offices
Preceded by Joseph Planta	Secretary to the Treasury (junior); 1827–1828	Succeeded by George Robert Dawson
Preceded by Charles Grant	Vice-President of the Board of Trade; 1828	Succeeded by Thomas Courtenay
Preceded by William Vesey-FitzGerald	Treasurer of the Navy; 1830	Succeeded by Charles Poulett Thomson
Baronetage of the United Kingdom
New title	Baronet (of Harpton Court, Radnor); 1846–1855	Succeeded by George Cornewall Lewis
