= Gerald Phillips =

Welsh cricketer (1886–1938)

Personal information
- Full name: Gerald Courtenay Phillips
- Born: 3 November 1886; Crumlin, Monmouthshire, Wales
- Died: 26 January 1938 (aged 51); Regent's Park, London, England
- Batting: Right-handed
- Bowling: Unknown
- Relatives: Frank Phillips (brother); Noel Phillips (brother)

Domestic team information
- Years: Team
- 1910/11–1926/27: Europeans

Career statistics
Competition	First-class
Matches	11
Runs scored	551
Batting average	30.61
100s/50s	–/6
Top score	94
Balls bowled	96
Wickets	4
Bowling average	11.50
5 wickets in innings	–
10 wickets in match	–
Best bowling	2/9
Catches/stumpings	1/–
- Source: ESPNcricinfo, 19 November 2022

Gerald Courtenay Phillips (3 November 1886 — 26 January 1938) was a Welsh first-class cricketer and British Indian Army officer.

The son of P. S. Phillips, he was born in November 1886 at Crumlin, Monmouthshire. He was educated at Marlborough College, where he played for the college cricket team. Going to British India, Phillips served in the British Indian Army Reserve during the First World War, being commissioned as a second lieutenant in June 1915, with him holding the rank of captain in April 1918. During the war, he served on the Western Front and in Palestine with the Poona Horse. While in India, he played first-class cricket as a batsman for the Europeans cricket team, making nine appearances in the Bombay Quadrangular Matches from 1910 to 1926. He also made one non-Quadrangular appearance for the Europeans, in addition to playing for a combined Europeans and Parsees team against the touring Marylebone Cricket Club in 1926. Phillips scored 551 runs in his eleven first-class matches at an average of 30.61, with six half centuries and a highest score of 94. He also bowled on occasion, taking 4 wickets. Outside of cricket, he was in business in Bombay. Phillips retired to England, where he was resident at Kingsland. In his latter years, he was cared for in a residential care home in London, where he died in January 1938. His brothers, Frank and Noel, both played first-class cricket.
