= James Price (of Monachty) =

Welsh politician

James Price (born c. 1566) was a Welsh politician who sat in the House of Commons of England between 1593 and 1622.

Price was the son of John Price of Monaughty House and his wife Elizabeth Whitney, daughter of Sir Robert Whitney of Whitney, Herefordshire. He matriculated at Brasenose College, Oxford on 13 June 1589 aged 18 and became a student of Middle Temple in 1588.

In 1593, he was elected Member of Parliament for Radnorshire and was re-elected MP for Radnorshire in 1597. He was High Sheriff of Radnorshire in 1599. He was re-elected MP for Radnorshire in 1601, 1604, 1614 and 1621. he was deputy lieutenant for the county by 1603 until at least 1625.

He married Alice, the daughter of Edward Croft of Croft Castle, Herefordshire; they had 2 sons and 2 daughters.

Parliament of England
Preceded by Ieuan Lewis	Member of Parliament for Radnorshire; 1593–1622	Succeeded by James Price
