= Fowler baronets of Islington (1628) =

Escutcheon of the Fowler baronets of Islington

The Fowler baronetcy of Islington in the County of Middlessex was created in the Baronetage of England on 21 May 1628 for Thomas Fowler and was extinct on his death in 1656.

Fowler's stepmother Mary née Catlyn (died 1620) was the daughter of Robert Catlyn. She married, firstly, Sir John Spencer (died 1599) and was mother of Robert Spencer, 1st Baron Spencer of Wormleighton. She married, secondly, Sir Thomas Fowler after the death of his second wife Jane Charlet, with whom he was father of the Baronet.

== Background ==
The 1st Baronet was Thomas Fowler IV in succession to his great-grandfather Thomas Fowler I, Member of Parliament for Calais in 1547, who died in 1556. Thomas Fowler I was water-bailiff for Calais, and had one son, Thomas Fowler II who died in 1560; he also acquired the manor of Barnsbury. Thomas Fowler III, an infant when his father Thomas Fowler II died, was knighted by James I in 1603, as was his son Thomas Fowler IV.

The Fowler family house, on what is now Cross Street, Islington, had grounds running to the north. By 1588 it had stained glass windows with the Fowler arms, and those of Heron (by marriage). The brick Queen Elizabeth's Lodge of the period was built at the north end of the grounds, and also carried the Fowler arms. Queen Elizabeth paid visits to Thomas Fowler, and to Sir John Spencer of Canonbury House. John Timbs wrote in 1855:

Fowler's House, Islington, fronts Cross-street: a ceiling bears the date 1595; at the extremity of the garden is a lodge, probably built as a summer-house by Sir Thomas Fowler the younger, whose arms and the date 1655 are in the wall. Sir Thomas Fowler the elder, who died 1624, was a juryman on Sir Walter Raleigh's trial.

== Fowler baronets, of Islington (1628) ==
- Thomas Fowler, 1st and only Baronet (1586–1656), left no male heir. He had married by 1602 Elizabeth Pierson, daughter of William Pierson, and the couple had a family of 12 children. Of five sons, four died young, and John died in 1638 not leaving issue.
