= Thomas Bernard Collinson =

Royal Engineers officer (1821–1902)

Major-General Thomas Bernard Collinson
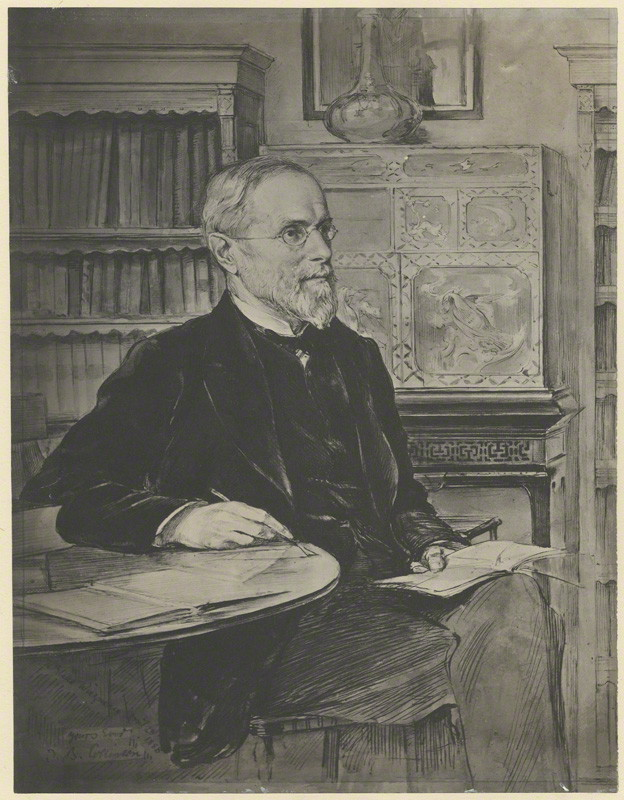
- Portrait after Theodore Blake Wirgman, 1888, National Portrait Gallery, London
- Born: 17 November 1821; Gateshead, County Durham
- Died: 1 May 1902 (aged 80); Little Haven, Ealing, Middlesex
- Relatives: Richard Collinson (brother)
- Military career
- Allegiance: United Kingdom
- Branch: Board of Ordnance; British Army
- Service years: 1838–1873
- Rank: Major-General
- Service number: 683
- Unit: Corps of Royal Engineers
- Commands: CRE, Aldershot, 1856; CRE, Dover, 1869–1873
- Campaigns: New Zealand Wars; Whanganui campaign; St John's Wood, 1847
- Awards: New Zealand War Medal, 1847
- Memorials: Collinson Prize, Institution of Royal Engineers (Originated 1905); Major General Thomas B Collinson, Personal Memorial Prize, Institution of Royal Engineers (Originated 1906)
- Other work: Magistrate, Commission of the Peace for the Province of New Munster, New Zealand, 1847–

Major-General Thomas Bernard Collinson (17 November 1821 – 1 May 1902) was an English military engineer of the Corps of Royal Engineers who carried out the earliest British surveys of Hong Kong, and planned roads and other early military and civil engineering works in New Zealand. Immediately prior to retirement, he was architect to the Scottish Prison Commission.

== Origin and military service ==
Collinson was born in Gateshead, County Durham, ninth child of fifteen of Rev. John Collinson, Rector of Gateshead, and Amelia King. Educated at the Royal Military Academy, Woolwich, he was commissioned in the Corps of Royal Engineers as No. 683, with the rank of second lieutenant, on 16 June 1838, at the age of 16. He spent his first five years on Ordnance Survey work in Wales, Ireland and Northern England. He advanced to rank of lieutenant on 9 March 1841 and was sent to Hong Kong and New Zealand in 1843. His service over the years, before his retirement with the rank of major-general in 1873 at the age of 51, took him to Hong Kong, Sydney, Auckland, Wellington, Wanganui, Hobart Town, London, Waltham Abbey, Aldershot, Corfu, Malta, Chatham and Dover. He was the younger brother of Sir Richard Collinson, RN, who pioneered hydrographic surveys of the southern China coast in HM ships Sulphur and Plover, and commanded HMS Enterprise in the 1850–1855 search for Sir John Franklin's expedition missing in the Northwest Passage since 1845. An elder sister, Julia Collinson (Julia de Winton) was a well-known English novelist.

== Surveying Hong Kong ==
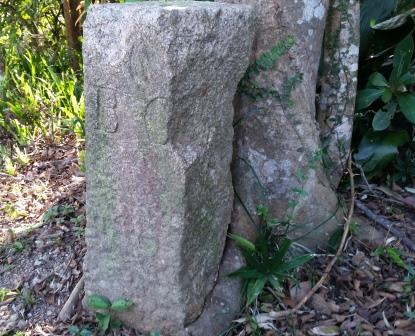
Lei Yue Mun Park, place of the sole remaining stone trig station of T B Collinson's 1843–1845 survey

Collinson, accompanied by one sergeant and thirty-three sappers, left Woolwich on the HEICS Mount Stewart Elphinstone for Hong Kong on 24 May 1843 and arrived there on 7 October. Major Edward Aldrich, RE, wife and servant who'd left from Southampton in January, had arrived in Hong Kong on 10 June. As Commanding Royal Engineer, Hong Kong, Aldrich had relieved Lieutenant John Ouchterlony, Madras Engineers, East India Company, who'd directed military engineering as acting engineer in the new settlement since 1841.

Collinson took up the role of executive engineer and immediately commenced making the first set of detailed scientifically surveyed maps of the island, employing knowledge gained from his recent Ordnance survey work. Determined to make a perfect map, he represented elevation by contour line, a system introduced on Ordnance maps during the Ordnance survey of Ireland by Colonel Thomas Colby, RE, Captain Thomas Larcom, RE, and Lieutenant George Augustus Bennett, RE, in the late 1830s. He also added soundings and other nautical information from the Admiralty chart of Hong Kong by Captain Edward Belcher, RN, HMS Sulphur. Collinson revealed to his children in his journal:

It was a work of some labour, but by the system I adopted partly by the ordinary triangulation, and partly by the nautical plan of taking rounds of angles from fixed points and plotting them, I was able to get the out of door work done during the winter months, leaving calculations and plotting to the summer. Lines of level from mean water mark were carried across various points, and from there the contours were filled in with compass and a pocket reflecting level. To all the points fixed by rounds of angles, I also took vertical angles & they therefore formed independent checks to the contours.

Between 1843 and 1845, Collinson established 27 trigonometric stations around Hong Kong Island. Only one stone trig station now remains, revealed by a University of Hong Kong team on 3 October 2015, at Lei Yue Mun Park. He also recorded many place names for the first time, including prominent locations in today's Hong Kong—Shek O, Chai Wan, Shau Kei Wan, Quarry Bay, Tai Tam, Tin Wan, Wan Chai, and Pok Fu Lam. Cape Collinson, Mount Collinson, Collinson Street, Cape Collinson Road and Path, on Hong Kong Island, were all named in his honour.

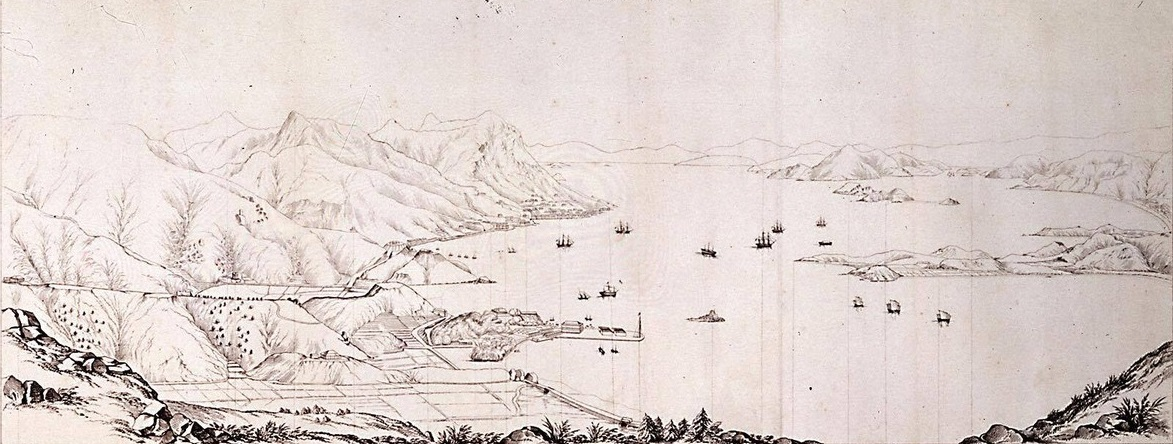
Sketch of Victoria Harbour during his time in Hong Kong, published in 1845

Collinson was rewarded by the engraving of his map at Ordnance Survey, Southampton, and with a compliment from the geographer John Arrowsmith that it was the most complete map he had ever seen. He also produced early detailed sketches of Hong Kong. His drawings were of such an admirable standard that Major Edward Aldrich, RE, illustrated his 21 July 1846 report on the erection of Ordnance buildings in Hong Kong with them.

== New Zealand ==
On 11 June 1846, Collinson embarked on the Emily Jane for Sydney, New South Wales, and after a brief stay there, he sailed for Auckland, New Zealand, on the trading brigantine Terror, arriving on 19 September 1846 to difficult times of conflict between the Pakeha settlers and the native Māori population. By November, he had sailed for Wellington and then spent over three years working on military buildings and defences there and in Wanganui. Collinson was a keen illustrator and many examples, some featuring Māori, are kept at the Alexander Turnbull Library of the National Library of New Zealand.

Collinson returned to his station in Wellington in 1848, where duties included a plan for the defence of Wellington, the arrangement and construction of military buildings, and a report on the earthquake that damaged the Paremata Barracks at Porirua. He also made occasional visits to Wanganui and explorations about the local countryside.

Sometime about September 1849 Lieutenant-Colonel Daniel Bolton, RE, sent Collinson a note saying that Lieutenant James Liddell, RE, was on his way to New Zealand with some sappers and that Collinson was ordered home. Collinson wrote to his sister Charlotte saying he’d hoped to be left to finish plans for his grand fortress—Mt Cook Barracks, Wellington. The great undertaking to produce an Ordnance map of New Zealand would have to be left to some future Commanding Royal Engineer. Liddell, age 20 years, had left England on the brig Richard Dart on 5 April but, by the time of Bolton’s note, had perished with a good part of his detachment of twenty-eight Royal Sappers and Miners when the ship struck rocks at Prince Edward Island of the Prince Edward Islands, sub-antarctic Indian Ocean, on 19 June 1849. In consequence, Lieutenant Francis Rawdon Chesney, RE, set out for New Zealand in March 1850 with a detachment of twenty-seven men of the Royal Sappers and Miners.

Collinson completed a paper on New Zealand timber trees, with notes supplied by the naturalist William Swainson, FRS, in February 1850 and in the following month, March, departed New Zealand for Hobart Town, Van Diemen’s Land (Tasmania), on a homeward bound journey to England. During his service in New Zealand, he had served under two Commanding Royal Engineers—Brevet-Major William Biddlecomb Marlow, RE, and Lieutenant-Colonel Daniel Bolton, RE.

== Homeward bound ==
Whilst at Hobart Town, Van Dieman’s Land, on Tuesday, 26 March 1850, Collinson forwarded his paper 'On Timber Trees of New Zealand' to the Royal Society of Van Dieman’s Land along with samples of timber and dried leaves of the principal forest trees found in the southern part of New Zealand, and was admitted into the Society at its April meeting. His paper was read before the Society on 10 July 1850 and published in the following year.

== England ==
On his return to England in 1850, he was soon employed at the Great Exhibition as the ‘Superintendent of British Side of Building' under the general superintendence of Colonel Sir William Reid, RE. He also supplied the statistics of New Zealand for publication in the Official Descriptive and Illustrated Catalogue. For the New Zealand exhibit, South Area Q and R 32, his father, the Rev. John Collinson, provided article no. 3.—geological specimens, iron sand from New Plymouth, a small bag made of New Zealand flax made by a lady, flax prepared by Māori (native pattern and dyes) and a mat of New Zealand flax made by Māori. Following this he was sent to Waltham until placed in command of the Royal Engineers at Aldershot in 1856. That year he married Katherine Baker, daughter of the Rev. J Baker, Chancellor of the Diocese of Durham, and Catherine Haggit.

== Death ==
Collinson died at Little Haven, Ealing, on 1 May 1902. He was a wealthy man, leaving an estate of £20,534 10s 8d.

== Publications ==
- Collinson, Thomas Bernard (1850). "30. The Commanding Royal Engineer, New Zealand, to the Inspector General of Fortifications, forwarding a Copy of a Report from Captain Collinson, Royal Engineers, on the several Military Posts in the Southern District, dated 16th April, 1848, with a Plan; Report on the Port Nicholson District". Corps Papers, Memoirs on Military Subjects; Compiled from Contributions of the Officers the Royal Engineers and the East India Company's Engineers. 1. London: John Weale: 389–396.
- Collinson, Thomas Bernard (January 1851). "On Timber Trees of New Zealand". Papers and Proceedings of the Royal Society of van Dieman's Land. 1 (3). Tasmania: Royal Society of Tasmania: 225–234.
- Collinson, Thomas Bernard (28 September 1850), Memorandum Concerning the Military Defence of Honolulu, San Francisco
- Collinson, Thomas Bernard (1853). "2. Remarks on the Military Operations in New Zealand" (PDF). Papers on Subjects Connected with the Duties of the Corps of Royal Engineers. New Series 3. London: John Weale: 5–73.
- Collinson, Thomas Bernard (1855). "2. Continuation of the Remarks on the Military Operations in New Zealand" (PDF). Papers on Subjects Connected with the Duties of the Corps of Royal Engineers. New Series 4. London: John Weale: 22–50.
- Collinson, Thomas Bernard (1855). "3. Breaching Stockades with Bags of Gunpowder at Chatham: Accompanied by the Records of Experiments made at the Royal Engineer Establishment at Chatham, in 1846-47" (PDF). Papers on Subjects Connected with the Duties of the Corps of Royal Engineers. New Series 4. London: John Weale: 51–53.
- Collinson, Thomas Bernard (1862). "6. Description of the Ruins of the Acropolis of Cassope, in Epirus, 15 Miles North of Prevesa. 1860". The Journal of the Royal Geographical Society of London. 32 (3): 68–74. doi:10.2307/1798400. JSTOR 1798400.
- Collinson, Thomas Bernard (1861–62). "1. Description of the Ruins of Cassope". Proceedings of the Royal Geographical Society of London. 6 (3): 106–107. doi:10.2307/1799096. JSTOR 1799096.
- Collinson, Thomas Bernard (1865). "Iron Casemates—Part II: Projects for Iron Casemates" (PDF). Papers on Subjects Connected with the Duties of the Corps of Royal Engineers. New Series 14: 83–126.
- Collinson, Thomas Bernard (1865). "Iron Casemates—Part I: On the Application of Iron to Casemates" (PDF). Papers on Subjects Connected with the Duties of the Corps of Royal Engineers. New Series 14: 69–83.
- Collinson, Thomas Bernard (1869). "A Proposition for One General Military School for the Army". Journal of the Royal United Service Institution. 13 (54): 241–262. doi:10.1080/03071846909424323.
- Collinson, Thomas Bernard (1874). "The Strategic Importance of the Military Harbours in the British Channel as Connected with Defensive and Offensive Operations". Journal of the Royal United Service Institution. 18 (77): 227–264. doi:10.1080/03071847409427634.
- Collinson, Thomas Bernard (1876). "A Warning Voice from the Spanish Armada". Journal of the Royal United Service Institution. 19 (81): 285–333. doi:10.1080/03071847509415970.
- Collinson, Thomas Bernard (1876). "Another Warning Voice from 1805". Journal of the Royal United Service Institution. 20 (85): 1–60. doi:10.1080/03071847609427099.
- Collinson, Thomas Bernard (1877). "On the Present Facilities for the Invasion of England, and for the Defence Thereof". Journal of the Royal United Service Institution. 21 (89): 1–37, 38–39. doi:10.1080/03071847709417092.
- Collinson, Thomas Bernard (February 1877). "Mobilisations and its aftermath". The Royal Engineer Journal.
- Collinson, Thomas Bernard; Collinson, Richard (1877). On the Use of the "Torpedo" and the "Ram" in Resisting Invasion: Or the "Battle of the Boats"; Addressed to the People of England, the Dearest Interests of Everyone of Whom Are Involved in the Result. London: W. Mitchell.
- Collinson, Richard (1889). Collinson, Thomas Bernard (ed.). Journal of H.M.S. Enterprise, on the Expedition in Search of Sir John Franklin's Ships by Behring Strait. 1850-55. London: Sampson Low, Marston, Searle, & Rivington.
- Collinson, Thomas Bernard (March 1890). "Col. Sir H. Yule, R.E., C.B., K.C.S.I.". The Royal Engineer Journal.
- Collinson, Thomas Bernard, Seven Years Service on the Borders of the Pacific Ocean, 1843–1850. Written for the Information and Satisfaction of my Children, vol. 2, unpublished (Alexander Turnbull Library, MSZ-1433)
- Collinson, Thomas Bernard, Seven Years Service on the Borders of the Pacific Ocean, 1843–1850. Written for the Information and Satisfaction of my Children, vol. 1, unpublished (Alexander Turnbull Library)
- Collinson, Thomas Bernard (1903). Webber, Charles Edmund (ed.). General Sir Henry Drury Harness, K.C.B.: Colonel Commandant Royal Engineers. London: Royal Engineers Institute Committee.

== Maps ==
- Collinson, Thomas Bernard (1845). The Ordnance Map of Hong Kong. Surveyed by Lieutenant Collinson, R.E., 1845 (Map). 4 inches to 1 mile. Southampton: Ordnance. (Select 'Map 1845')
- Collinson, Thomas Bernard (1846). Hong Kong Harbour from a hill above Chauseway Bay, 500 feet high (Map).
