= Richard Collinson =

Royal Navy Admiral and explorer (1811–1883)

Admiral Sir Richard Collinson KCB FRGS
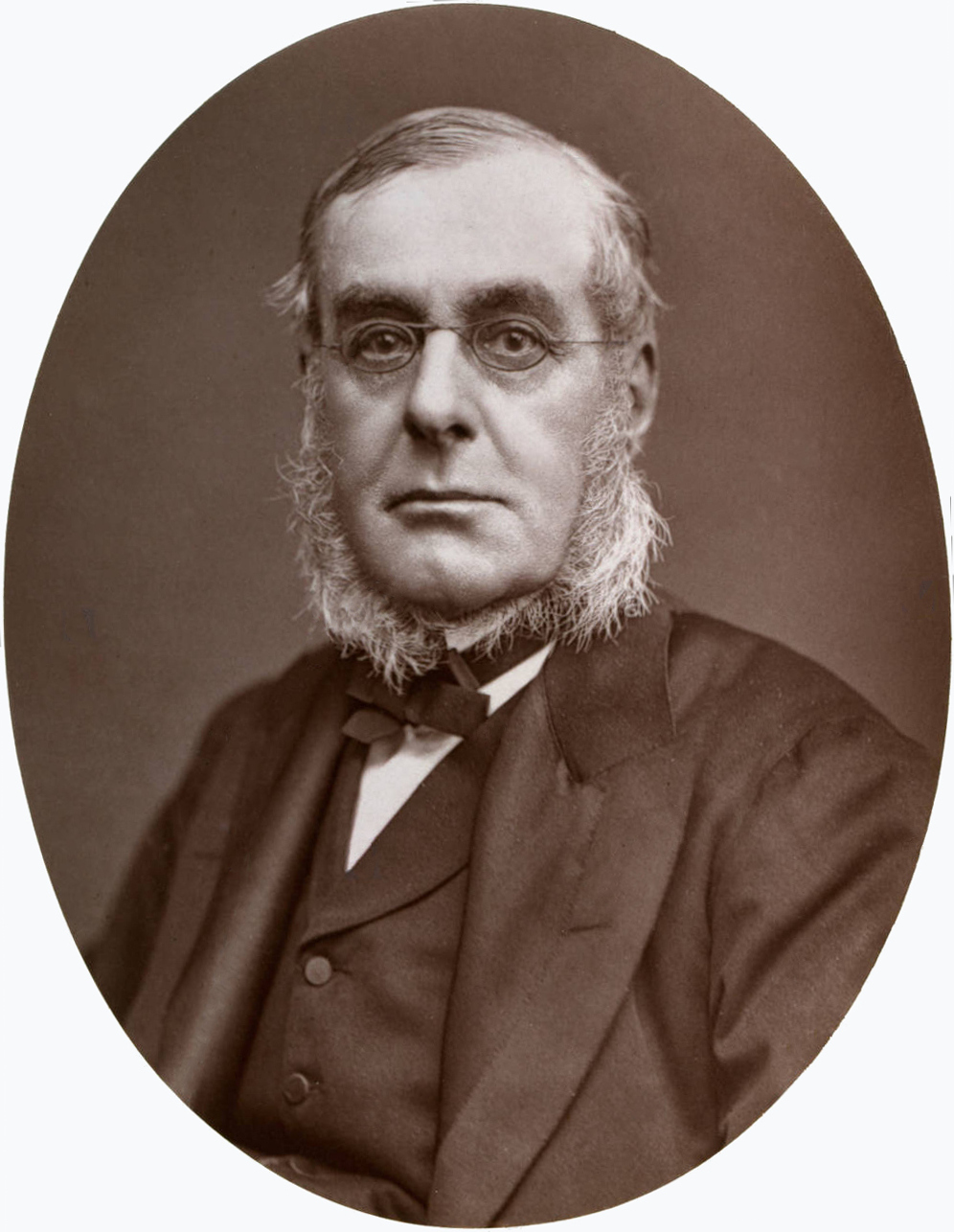
- Collinson in 1877
- Born: 7 November 1811
- Died: 13 August 1883 (aged 71)
- Relatives: Thomas Bernard Collinson (brother); Julia Cecilia Stretton (sister)
- Military career
- Allegiance: United Kingdom
- Branch: Royal Navy
- Rank: Admiral
- Served on: HMS Cambridge, 1823– HMS Gloucester, 1827– HMS Chanticleer, 1828– HMS Ætna, 1831– HMS Salamander, 1833– HMS Medea, 1834– HMS Sulphur, 1835– HMS President, 1838– HMS Wellesley, 1840; HMS Bentinck / Plover, 1842–1846; HMS Enterprise, 1849–1855
- Commands: HMS Plover; HMS Enterprise
- Campaigns: China War, 1839–1842
- Awards: Knight Commander of the Most Honourable Order of the Bath, 1875; Companion of the Most Honourable Military Order of the Bath, 1842; China War Medal; Arctic Medal; Founder's Medal, 1858

Admiral Sir Richard Collinson KCB FRGS (7 November 1811 – 13 September 1883) was an English naval officer and explorer of the Northwest Passage.

== Early life ==
He was born in Gateshead, Tyne and Wear, England, then part of County Durham, the third son of five, of Rector John Collinson and Amelia King Collinson. He also had 10 sisters. One younger brother was Thomas Bernard Collinson, later a military engineer who worked on the first Great Exhibition and also wrote Richard's biography, and Julia Collinson, later a prominent novelist. He joined the Royal Navy in 1823 at age twelve and rose in the ranks, becoming a lieutenant in 1835, commander in 1841, and captain in 1842.

== China ==
Collinson was in command of HMS Bentinck, a vessel of 1800 tons burden and 520 horsepower, when it appeared with the Phlegethon off Chapoo in eastern China, causing a "sensation".

On 1 April 1842, Henry Pottinger, British Plenipotentiary of Trade, reported that the steamer HEICS Nemesis, recently refitted at Chusan, had been sent to reconnoitre Taisam island near Ningbo in February that year. It was believed that Chinese troops were gathering to attack British forces at Tinghae, Chusan. Commander Collinson was on board Nemesis for purpose of making survey observations. Collinson and Captain William Hutcheon Hall landed the steamer's company, contributing to a successful skirmish with Chinese troops on the island.

As commander of the Bentinck, renamed HMS Plover, and with the aid of Lt Henry Kellett in HMS Starling, he surveyed the China coast from 1842 to 1846, producing charts upon which all successors were based.

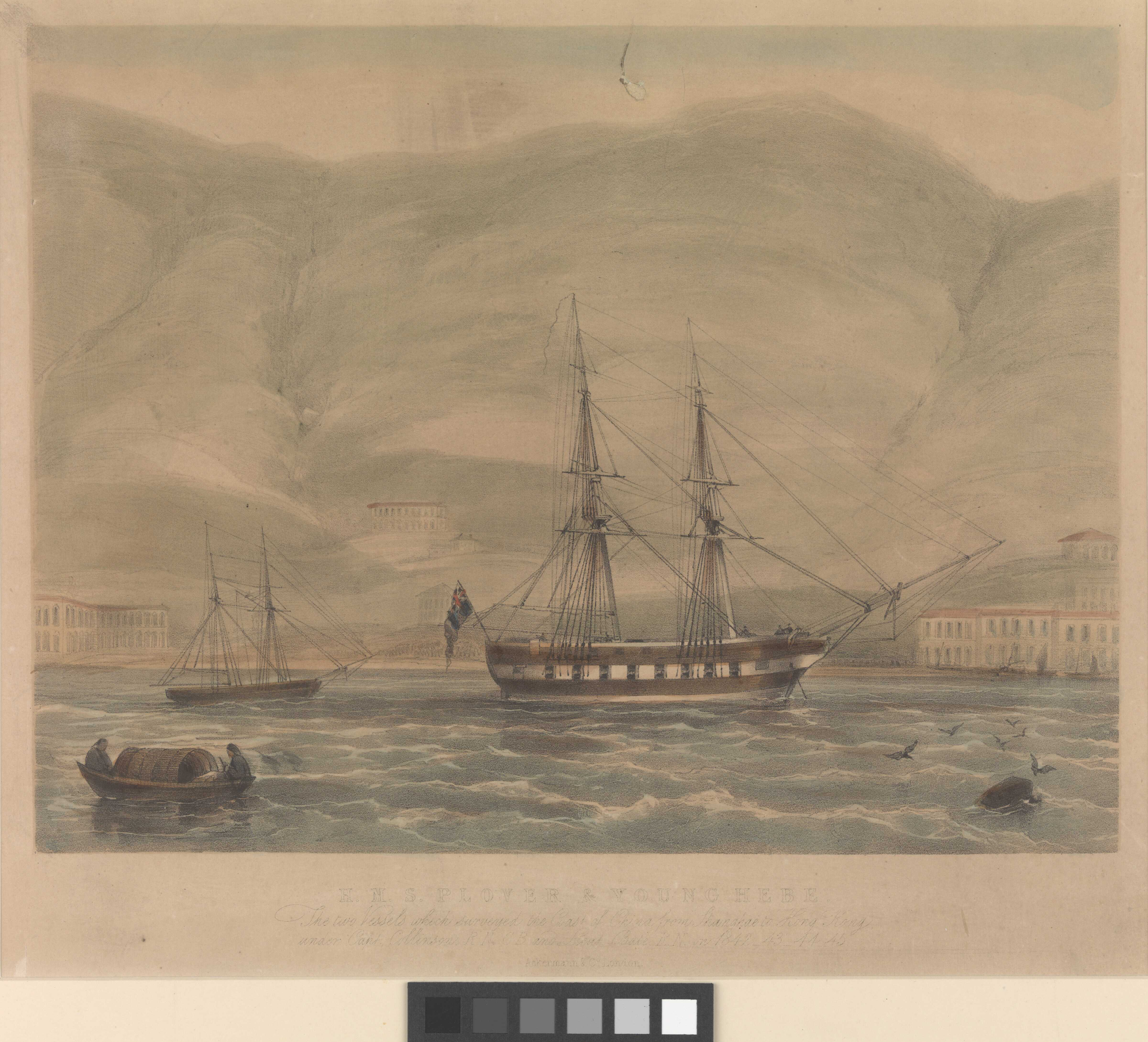
HMS Plover commanded by Collinson from 1842 to 1846 during his survey of the coast of China

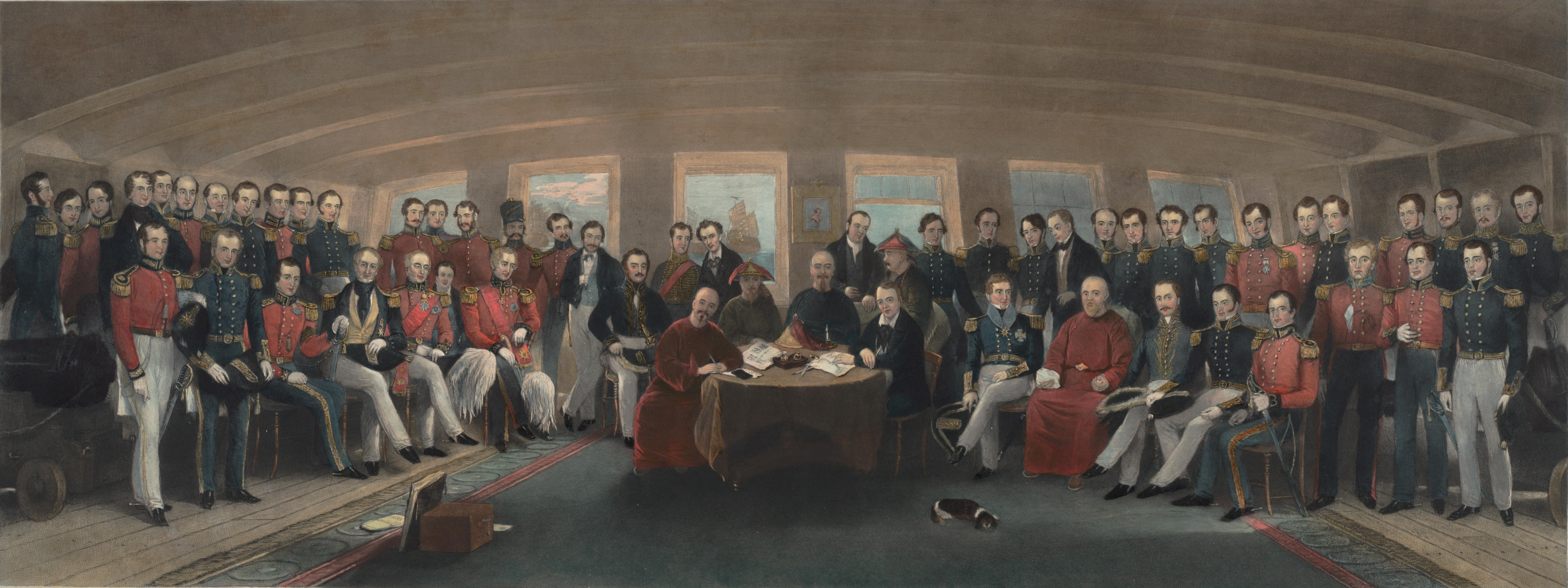
Capt. Collinson, CB, RN, present at the signing of the Treaty of Nanking on board HMS Cornwallis (see file information, Key, No. 22). Artist: Capt. John Platt, Bengal Volunteers

== Bering Strait ==
The three expeditions sent in 1848 to locate Sir John Franklin and Franklin's lost expedition in search of the Northwest Passage all failed. In 1850 Collinson was instructed to look for him in the Canadian Arctic by sailing eastward from the Bering Strait and Alaska, while Horatio Austin and others would use the normal route westward through the Parry Channel. Collinson was given HMS Enterprise and was to be accompanied by Commander Robert McClure commanding HMS Investigator. They left Plymouth in January 1850.

After becoming separated off the coast of Chile the two ships became independent. (McClure got to the Bering Strait first and was frozen in on Banks Island. When he was rescued and taken to England he became the first person to traverse the Northwest Passage). When Collinson reached the Bering Strait and learned that McClure was ahead of him he turned back and spent the winter in Hong Kong. He returned to Bering Strait in mid-July 1851 and sailed east along the coast. On 29 August he was off the coast of Banks Island and saw an open strait tending northeast. This was the Prince of Wales Strait. He entered the strait thinking that he might have found the northwest passage, but after a while he saw a flagpole on a hill. Under the flagstaff was a message saying that McClure had wintered here the previous year. Collinson pushed on a little beyond McClure's maximum before he was blocked by ice. Returning south he found another message saying that McClure had passed that point only 18 days before but it did not mention McClure's plan to circumnavigate the island. He went a little further southeast and chose winter quarters at Minto Inlet. Here he found another message left by one of McClure's sledging parties.

In the spring of 1852 he sent a sledge party north to Melville Island where they found tracks from an unknown traveller (these were McClure's men who were frozen in to the west.) On 5 August he was freed from the ice and went along the south coast of Victoria Island into the Coronation Gulf, the easternmost point reached by a ship from the Bering Strait. He wintered at Cambridge Bay on the southeast coast of Victoria Island.

In the spring of 1853 he led a sledge party to the easternmost point on the island (Point Pelly). A little later some Inuit drew them a map of the area to the east. On the map was a ship. If Collinson had not disregarded this, or had had a proper interpreter, he might have sent a sledge party east and found some of Franklin's men, if they were still alive. He returned through Bering Strait and around the Cape of Good Hope. At the cape (January 1855) he learned of John Rae's report that Franklin had been lost just to the east of where he had turned back.

Collinson's reputation is lower than it perhaps should be. The problems are that McClure was always there first, and Collinson's constant quarrels with his officers and bad luck. Roald Amundsen praised him for navigating a large ship through waters that were difficult for Amundsen's small ship, Gjøa. Collinson's account of the voyage was published six years after his death by his brother, Thomas Bernard Collinson.

== Later life ==
He was elected Fellow of the Royal Geographical Society on 12 November 1855, awarded the Founder's Medal by the Royal Geographical Society in 1858, placed on the naval retired list in 1871 knighted in 1875 and promoted to admiral in 1875. In 1862, he became an "elder brother" of Trinity House and in 1875 became Deputy Master.
