= Thomas Lewis (of Harpton) =

16th-century English politician

Thomas Lewis (of Harpton) (1518/1519 – 1607) was a Welsh politician.

The son of Hugh Lewis of Gladestry and Harpton, Thomas Lewis was appointed to the magistrates' bench in 1547 and also served as Sheriff of Radnorshire in 1547. He subsequently served in a large number of local posts, including as a capital burgess and common councilman of New Radnor.

Lewis served as the Member of Parliament for Radnor from 1545 to 1553, and for Radnorshire from 1559 to 1567 and 1584–1587. He avoided the religious controversies of the day, although he was part of a commission designed to investigate an altar at New Radnor parish church which depicted Thomas Becket.

In 1566, Lewis bought the hill of Old Radnor from the Corporation of New Radnor. He remained active into his old age, serving as Sheriff of Montgomeryshire in 1592–1593.

Lewis married twice, having at least five sons and a daughter, Sarah.

Parliament of England
| Preceded by ? | Member of Parliament for Radnor; 1545–1553 | Succeeded by Rhys Lewis |
| Preceded by Ieuan Rhys | Member of Parliament for Radnorshire; 1559–1567 | Succeeded by ? |
| Preceded by Roger Vaughan | Member of Parliament for Radnorshire; 1584–1587 | Succeeded by Ieuan Rhys |
