= Walter Wilkins (1741–1828) =

British politician

Walter Wilkins (1741 – 17 March 1828), of Maesllwch, Radnorshire and Wallsworth Hall, Gloucestershire was an English Member of Parliament.

He was a younger son of attorney John Wilkins of The Priory, Brecon and was educated at Christ College, Brecon, Winchester School (1754–58) and Reeves's academy, London (1758).

He held the offices of High Sheriff of Radnorshire for 1774–75 and Breconshire for 1778–79. He served as Member of Parliament for Radnorshire from 1796 until his death in 1828 representing the Whig party.

He married Catherine, the daughter and heiress of Samuel Hayward of Wallsworth Hall; they had 1 son (Walter Wilkins) and 1 daughter.

Parliament of Great Britain
| Preceded by Thomas Johnes | Member of Parliament for Radnorshire; 1796 – 1800 | Succeeded by Parliament of the United Kingdom |
Parliament of the United Kingdom
| Preceded by Parliament of Great Britain | Member of Parliament for Radnorshire; 1801–1828 | Succeeded by Thomas Frankland Lewis |
