= Walter Wilkins (1809–1840) =

Welsh politician (1809–1840)

Walter Wilkins (18 October 1809 – 28 May 1840) aka Walter de Winton was a British politician.

The son of Walter Wilkins, an English MP, Wilkins lived in Maesllwch Castle and was educated at New College, Oxford. He inherited part-ownership of Wilkins's Old Bank, in Brecon. In 1831, he married Julia Cecilia Collinson (also known as Julia de Winton), the future novelist. They had at least two children:

- Sir Francis Walter de Winton, known as Sir Francis de Winton (1835–1901)
- Walter de Winton (1832–1878)

Wilkins was appointed as a magistrate for Radnorshire, and served as High Sheriff of Radnorshire in 1833. He stood in the 1835 UK general election for the Whigs, and won the seat. In 1839, he changed his name to Walter De Winton. He died in 1840, while still in office.

Parliament of the United Kingdom
Preceded by Thomas Frankland Lewis	Member of Parliament for Radnorshire; 1835–1840	Succeeded by John Walsh
