= Richard Jones (MP for Radnor) =

Welsh politician

Richard Jones (born c. 1578) was a Welsh politician who sat in the House of Commons between 1628 and 1640. He supported the Royalist cause in the English Civil War.

Jones was the son or grandson of Griffith Jones of Trewern.

He was elected High Sheriff of Radnorshire for either 1614 or 1617. In 1628 he was elected Member of Parliament for Radnorshire and held the seat until 1629 when King Charles decided to rule without parliament for eleven years.

In April 1640, Jones was elected MP for Radnor in the Short Parliament. He was a commissioner of array for King Charles in 1642 and issued warrants for raising money for the King's forces. In October 1645, he submitted to Parliament and begged to compound on 22 March 1647. His fine was set at £144 on 2 June 1648, but he petitioned that he had only an estate for life in £48 per annum and the fine was reduced to £73. On 27 May 1652 he was exempted and it was ordered that he be left to enjoy his estate.

He married Margaret, the daughter of John Price of Pilleth, who bore him 2 sons, both of whom predeceased him.

Parliament of England
Preceded by James Price (of Pilleth)	Member of Parliament for Radnorshire; 1628–1629	Parliament suspended until 1640
Vacant Parliament suspended since 1629	Member of Parliament for Radnor; 1640	Succeeded by Philip Warwick
