= Stephen Price (died 1562) =

Welsh politician

Stephen Price (c. 1522 – 1562), of Pilleth, Radnorshire, was a Welsh politician and member of the Parliament of England.

Price was born by 1522 into one of the leading Radnorshire families, the second son of Ieuan ap James ap Rhys of Monaughty (near Knighton, Powys), and of Margaret, daughter of Sir Edward Croft of Croft Castle, Herefordshire.

By 1543, Price had settled at Pilleth, and in 1555 he was elected knight of the shire.

He was a Member of Parliament (MP) for Radnorshire in 1555.

He died in 1562 during a term as escheator of Radnorshire.
