= Charles Vaughan (by 1529 – 1574 or later) =

English politician

Charles Vaughan (by 1529 – 1574 or later), of Hergest, Herefordshire, was an English politician.

== Family ==
Vaughan was the eldest son of James Vaughan of Hergest and his wife Elizabeth née Croft of Croft Castle, Yarpole, Herefordshire. Vaughan's first wife was Elizabeth Baskerville, a daughter of Sir James Baskerville of Eardisley, and they had one son and one daughter. By 1552, he had married again, to Margaret, a daughter of Sir William Vaughan of Porthaml, Breconshire, who was the widow of Roger Vaughan of Clyro, Radnorshire. They had five sons and four daughters.

Charles Vaughan who represented the constituency of Shaftesbury in 1572 was a distant cousin.

== Career ==
He was a Member (MP) of the Parliament of England for Radnorshire in October 1553.
