= Ieuan Lewis =

16th-century Welsh politician

Ieuan Lewis (by 1511 – 1597?), of Gladestry, Radnorshire, was a Welsh politician.

He was a member (MP) of the parliament of England for Radnorshire in 1558 and 1559.
