= Thomas Harley (of Kinsham) =

British lawyer, diplomat and Tory politician

Thomas Harley (c. 1667 – 1738), of Kinsham Court, Herefordshire. was a British lawyer, diplomat and Tory politician who sat in the English and British House of Commons from 1698 to 1715. He was an ally of his cousin Robert Harley.

== Early life ==
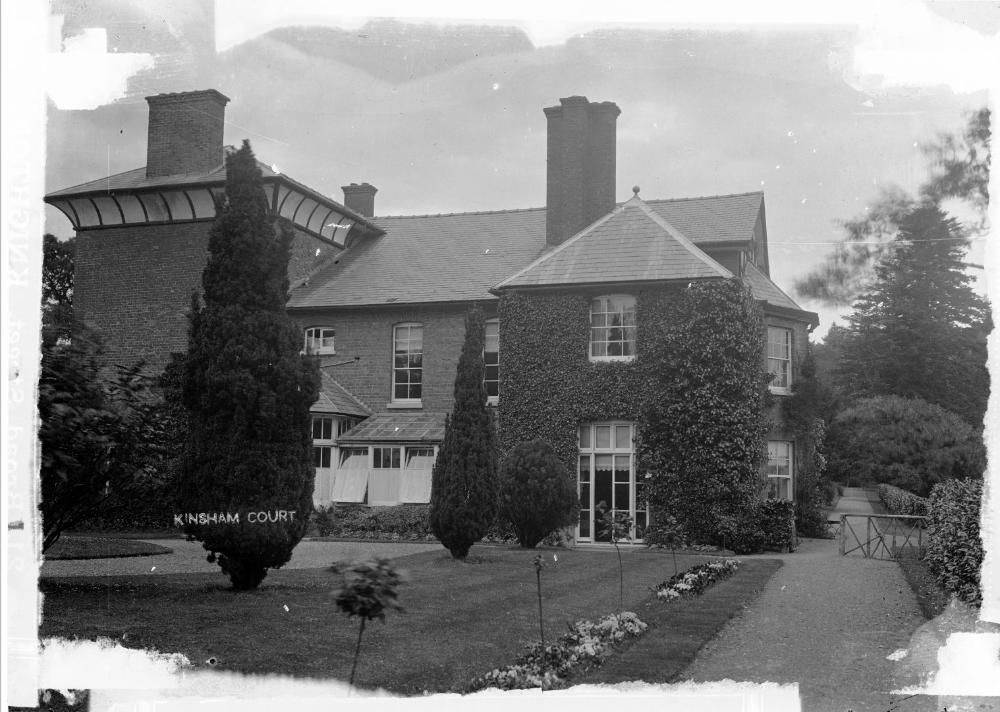
Kinsham Court

Harley was the eldest surviving son of Thomas Harley, of Kinsham Court, Herefordshire and his wife Abigail Saltonstall, daughter of Sir Richard Saltonstall of Huntwick and Woodsome, Yorkshire and granddaughter of Sir Richard Saltonstall. He succeeded his father in 1685. He was admitted at Middle Temple in 1682 and called to the bar in 1690.

== Career ==
Harley was made a deputy lieutenant of Herefordshire in 1694, and was a commissioner for subscriptions to the land bank in 1696. He went abroad to Spain and Portugal in 1697, and observed the negotiations for the Treaty of Ryswick on the way home. With the support of his cousin Robert, he was returned in a contest as Member of Parliament for Radnorshire at the 1698 English general election. Like the rest of his family, he was politically a Tory, and a loyal supporter of his cousin. He was returned for Radnorshire unopposed at the first general election of 1701. He was blacklisted for opposing preparations being made for war in 1701, and signed a Tory rejoinder. He was returned unopposed again at the second general election of 1701 and voted on 26 February 1702 for the motion which vindicated the proceedings of the Commons in impeaching the four Whig Lords.

Harley was returned unopposed again at the 1702 English general election. He was returned again at the 1705 English general election and although a Tory, supported the Court over the Court candidate for Speaker on 25 October 1705, and over the ‘place clause’ in the proceedings on the regency bill on 18 February 1706. At the 1708 British general election, he was returned as Tory MP for Radnorshire, and voted against the impeachment of Dr Sacheverell. He was returned again at the 1710 British general election and was listed as a ‘worthy patriot’ who exposed the mismanagements of the previous ministry, and a ‘Tory patriot’ favouring peace in April 1711. He was a commissioner for taking subscriptions to the South Sea Company in 1711. Under his cousin's Administration, he was appointed Junior Secretary to the Treasury in June 1711.

Harley was an entertaining wit, and a member of Jonathan Swift's circle, and was invited to join the 'Society of Brothers', a dining/drinking-club founded by Henry St John. However he was turned out in January 1712 for non-attendance. However his tactfulness and subtle dialogue marked him out as a natural diplomat, and he was chosen envoy to Hanover in 1712 to soothe the Elector over Great Britain's willingness to negotiate a peace with France, ending the War of the Spanish Succession. While he was well received in Holland and in Hanover, his mission was ultimately unsuccessful. In Parliament, he voted in favour of the French commerce bill on 18 June 1713. He was returned again for Radnorshire at the 1713 British general election. He was sent on another embassy to Hanover in 1714, and was again well-received but unsuccessful. The Elector was suspicious of him, and upon King George's ascent to the British throne he lost his place at the Treasury. At the 1715 British general election he was defeated in Radnorshire and lost his place on the Commission of the Peace. He was also arrested at the request of the committee of secrecy investigating the peace negotiations, and imprisoned for two months.

== Death and legacy ==
Harley died unmarried in January 1738, leaving most of his estate to Edward Harley, 3rd Earl of Oxford and Earl Mortimer.

Parliament of England
Preceded by John Jeffreys	Member of Parliament for Radnorshire; 1698–1707	Succeeded by Parliament of Great Britain
Parliament of Great Britain
Preceded by Parliament of England	Member of Parliament for Radnorshire; 1707–1715	Succeeded by Richard Fowler
Political offices
New office	Junior Secretary to the Treasury; 1711–1714	Succeeded by John Taylor
