= Lewis baronets =

Set index for Lewis baronets

There have been seven Baronetcies created for persons with the surname Lewis, two in the Baronetage of England and five in the Baronetage of the United Kingdom. Just one creation is extant as of 2026.

- Lewis baronets of Llangorse (1628): see Sir William Lewis, 1st Baronet (1598–1677)
- Lewis baronets of Ledstone (1660)
- Lewis baronets of Harpton Court (1846)
- Lewis baronets of Brighton (1887): see Sir Charles Lewis, 1st Baronet (1825–1893)
- Lewis baronets of Nantgwyne (1896): see Baron Merthyr
- Lewis baronets of Portland Place and The Danish Pavilion (1902)
- Lewis baronets of Essendon Place (1918): see Baron Essendon
