= John Knill (MP) =

16th-century English politician

John Knill or Acknyll (by 1519 – 1561 or 1564), of Knill, Herefordshire and Old Radnor Burlingjobb, Radnorshire, was an English member of parliament.

He was a member (MP) of the parliament of England for Radnorshire in 1545 and November 1554.
