= Monmouthshire County Cricket Club =

Monmouthshire County Cricket Club was a cricket team that represented the county of Monmouthshire in the Minor Counties Championship competition from 1901 to 1934.

The county was usually among the weakest in the Minor Counties competition, and only for a few seasons in the 1900s did it finish in the top half of the final table. In 1905, Monmouthshire's best season, the county came second to Norfolk.

After 1934, neighbouring Glamorgan, which had risen to first-class status in 1921, played fairly regularly at grounds within the Monmouthshire borders, including the county ground at Rodney Parade, Newport.
