= Radnorshire (UK Parliament constituency) =

UK Parliament constituency (1801–1918)

- Former county constituency for the House of Commons
- Context: 1832-1868. Extract from 1837 result: the "singly" yellow major area

1542–1918
- Seats: one
- Replaced by: Brecon and Radnor

Radnorshire was created in 1542 as a constituency of the House of Commons of the Parliament of England then of the Parliament of Great Britain from 1707 to 1800 and of the Parliament of the United Kingdom from 1801 to 1918. It elected one knight of the shire (MP) by the first past the post system.

By 1918, having too small a relative population the area was combined with that of Breconshire to form Brecon and Radnor constituency.

== Members of Parliament ==
=== MPs 1542–1604 ===
Parliament	Member
1542	John Baker, died 1544 and replaced by John Price
1545	John Knill
1547	Richard Blick
1553 (Mar)	
1553 (Oct)	Charles Vaughan
1554 (Apr)	John Bradshaw
1554 (Nov)	John Knill
1555	Stephen Price
1558	Ieuan Lewis
1559 (Jan)	Thomas Lewis
1562–1563	Thomas Lewis
1571	Walter Price
1572-1581	Roger Vaughan
1584-1585	Thomas Lewis
1586	Thomas Lewis
1588 (Oct)	Ieuan Lewis
1593	James Price
1597-1598	James Price
1601 (Oct)	James Price

=== MPs 1604–1918 ===
Election	Member	Party
1604-1611	James Price	
1614	James Price	
1621-1622:	James Price	
1624	James Price	
1625	James Price	
1626	James Price	
1628	Richard Jones	
1629–1640	No Parliaments summoned	
November 1640	Charles Price	Royalist
October 1642	Price disabled to sit - seat vacant	
1647	Arthur Annesley	
December 1648	Information not clear, sources say that Arthur continued to serve, however he might have been excluded in prides purge	
1653	Radnorshire was not separately represented in the Barebones Parliament	
Representation increased to two members, 1654
1654	George Gwynne and Henry Williams	
1656	George Gwynne and Henry Williams	
Representation reverted to one member, 1659
January 1659	Henry Williams	
May 1659	Not represented in the restored Rump	
April 1660	George Gwynne	
1661	Sir Richard Lloyd	
1677	Richard Williams	
1679	Rowland Gwynne	
1685	Richard Williams	
1689	Rowland Gwynne	
1690	Richard Williams	
1692	John Jeffreys	
1698	Thomas Harley	Tory
1715	Richard Fowler	
1722	Sir Humphrey Howorth	Whig
1755	Howell Gwynne	
1761	Marquess of Carnarvon	Whig
1768	Chase Price	
1777	Thomas Johnes	
1780	Thomas Johnes	
1784	Thomas Johnes	
1790	Thomas Johnes	
1796	Walter Wilkins	Whig
1828	Thomas Frankland Lewis	Tory
1834	Thomas Frankland Lewis	Conservative
1835	Walter Wilkins	Whig
1840	Sir John Walsh	Conservative
1868	Hon. Arthur Walsh	Conservative
1880	Sir Richard Green-Price	Liberal
1885	Hon. Arthur Walsh	Conservative
1892	Frank Edwards	Liberal
1895	Powlett Milbank	Conservative
1900	Frank Edwards	Liberal
January 1910	Sir Charles Dillwyn-Venables-Llewelyn	Conservative
December 1910	Sir Frank Edwards	Liberal

== Election results ==
Decades:	1840s; 1850s; 1860s; 1870s; 1880s; 1890s; 1900s; 1910s

=== Elections in the 1830s ===
General election 1830: Radnorshire
Party	Candidate	Votes	%
Tory	Thomas Frankland Lewis	Unopposed	
Registered electors		c. 800	
Tory gain from Whig			

General election 1831: Radnorshire
Party	Candidate	Votes	%
Tory	Thomas Frankland Lewis	Unopposed	
Registered electors		c. 800	
Tory hold			

General election 1832: Radnorshire
Party	Candidate	Votes	%
Tory	Thomas Frankland Lewis	Unopposed	
Registered electors		1,046	
Tory hold			

General election 1835: Radnorshire
Party	Candidate	Votes	%
Whig	Walter Wilkins (d. 1840)	483	51.4
Conservative	John Walsh	456	48.6
Majority		27	2.8
Turnout		939	87.4
Registered electors		1,074	
Whig gain from Conservative			

General election 1837: Radnorshire
Party	Candidate	Votes	%
Whig	Walter Wilkins (d. 1840)	Unopposed	
Registered electors		1,944	
Whig hold			

=== Elections in the 1840s ===
Wilkins' death caused a by-election.

By-election, 10 June 1840: Radnorshire
Party	Candidate	Votes	%	±%
Conservative	John Walsh	Unopposed		
Conservative gain from Whig				

General election 1841: Radnorshire
Party	Candidate	Votes	%	±%
Conservative	John Walsh	973	65.9	N/A
Whig	Alfred Harley	504	34.1	N/A
Majority		469	31.8	N/A
Turnout		1,477	71.5	N/A
Registered electors		2,067		
Conservative gain from Whig		Swing	N/A	

General election 1847: Radnorshire
Party	Candidate	Votes	%	±%
Conservative	John Walsh	Unopposed		
Registered electors		1,943		
Conservative hold				

=== Elections in the 1850s ===
General election 1852: Radnorshire
Party	Candidate	Votes	%	±%
Conservative	John Walsh	Unopposed		
Registered electors		1,802		
Conservative hold				

General election 1857: Radnorshire
Party	Candidate	Votes	%	±%
Conservative	John Walsh	Unopposed		
Registered electors		1,662		
Conservative hold				

General election 1859: Radnorshire
Party	Candidate	Votes	%	±%
Conservative	John Walsh	Unopposed		
Registered electors		1,656		
Conservative hold				

=== Elections in the 1860s ===
General election 1865: Radnorshire
Party	Candidate	Votes	%	±%
Conservative	John Walsh	Unopposed		
Registered electors		1,597		
Conservative hold				

Walsh was elevated to the peerage, becoming 1st Baron Ormathwaite and causing a by-election.

By-election, 28 April 1868: Radnorshire
Party	Candidate	Votes	%	±%
Conservative	Arthur Walsh	Unopposed		
Conservative hold				

General election 1868: Radnorshire
Party	Candidate	Votes	%	±%
Conservative	Arthur Walsh	Unopposed		
Registered electors		2,216		
Conservative hold				

=== Elections in the 1870s ===
General election 1874: Radnorshire
Party	Candidate	Votes	%	±%
Conservative	Arthur Walsh	889	48.8	N/A
Liberal	Richard Green-Price	832	45.7	New
Liberal	George Augustus Haig	100	5.5	New
Majority		57	3.1	N/A
Turnout		1,821	74.9	N/A
Registered electors		2,431		
Conservative hold		Swing	N/A	

=== Elections in the 1880s ===
General election 1880: Radnorshire
Party	Candidate	Votes	%	±%
Liberal	Richard Green-Price	1,137	58.7	+13.0
Conservative	Robert Mynors	800	41.3	−7.5
Majority		337	17.4	N/A
Turnout		1,937	79.6	+4.7
Registered electors		2,434		
Liberal gain from Conservative		Swing	+10.3	

General election 1885: Radnorshire
Party	Candidate	Votes	%	±%
Conservative	Arthur Walsh	1,880	50.9	+9.6
Liberal	Charles Rogers	1,813	49.1	−9.6
Majority		67	1.8	N/A
Turnout		3,693	81.4	+1.8
Registered electors		4,539		
Conservative gain from Liberal		Swing	+9.6	

General election 1886: Radnorshire
Party	Candidate	Votes	%	±%
Conservative	Arthur Walsh	1,910	53.4	+2.5
Liberal	Richard Green-Price	1,668	46.6	−2.5
Majority		242	6.8	+5.0
Turnout		3,578	78.8	−2.6
Registered electors		4,539		
Conservative hold		Swing	+2.5	

=== Elections in the 1890s ===
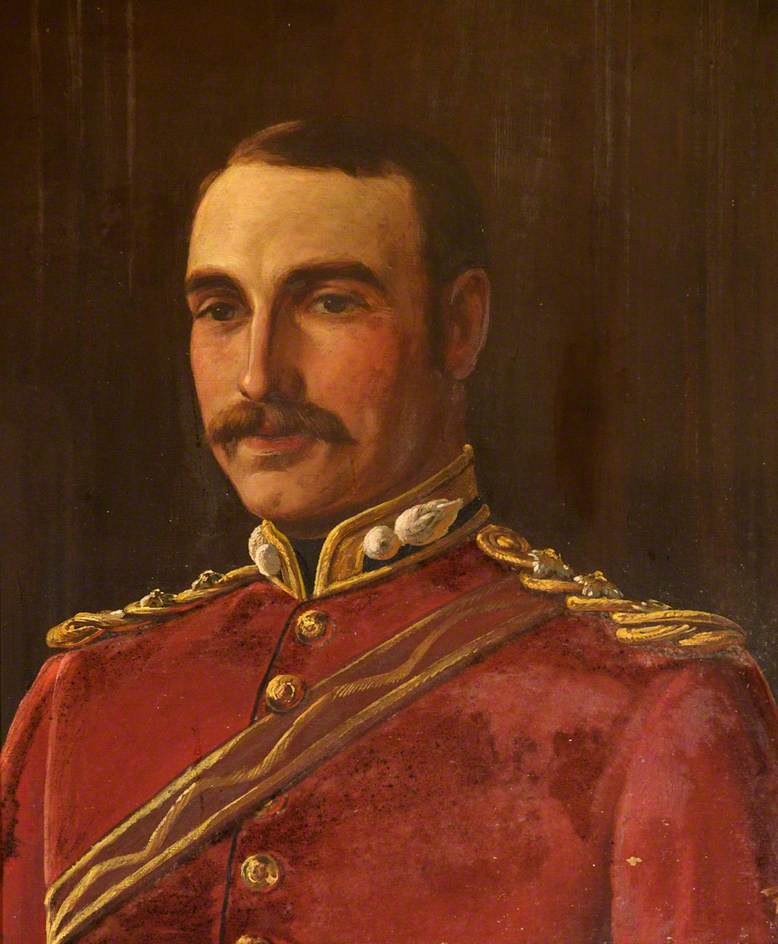
Bradney

General election 1892: Radnorshire
Party	Candidate	Votes	%	±%
Liberal	Francis Edwards	1,973	53.1	+6.5
Conservative	Joseph Bradney	1,740	46.9	−6.5
Majority		233	6.2	N/A
Turnout		3,713	81.9	+3.1
Registered electors		4,535		
Liberal gain from Conservative		Swing	+6.5	

General election 1895: Radnorshire
Party	Candidate	Votes	%	±%
Conservative	Powlett Milbank	1,949	51.0	+4.1
Liberal	Francis Edwards	1,870	49.0	−4.1
Majority		79	2.0	N/A
Turnout		3,819	78.9	−3.0
Registered electors		4,838		
Conservative gain from Liberal		Swing	+4.1	

=== Elections in the 1900s ===
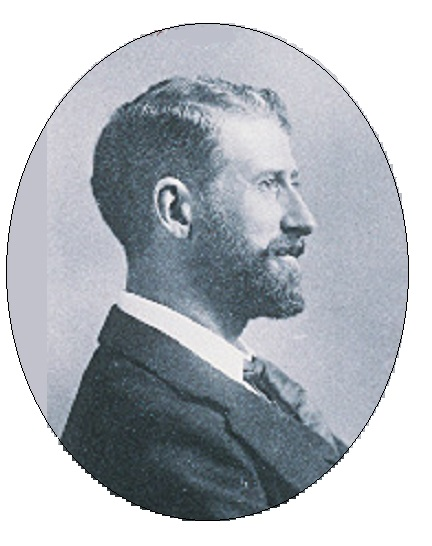
Edwards

General election 1900: Radnorshire
Party	Candidate	Votes	%	±%
Liberal	Francis Edwards	2,082	52.1	+3.1
Conservative	Charles Dillwyn-Venables-Llewelyn	1,916	47.9	−3.1
Majority		166	4.2	N/A
Turnout		3,998	76.6	−2.3
Registered electors		5,219		
Liberal gain from Conservative		Swing	+3.1	

General election 1906: Radnorshire
Party	Candidate	Votes	%	±%
Liberal	Francis Edwards	2,187	52.1	0.0
Conservative	Charles Dillwyn-Venables-Llewelyn	2,013	47.9	0.0
Majority		174	4.2	0.0
Turnout		4,200	76.8	+0.2
Registered electors		5,466		
Liberal hold		Swing	0.0	

=== Elections in the 1910s ===
General election January 1910: Radnorshire
Party	Candidate	Votes	%	±%
Conservative	Charles Dillwyn-Venables-Llewelyn	2,222	50.2	+2.3
Liberal	Francis Edwards	2,208	49.8	−2.3
Majority		14	0.4	N/A
Turnout		4,430	74.2	−2.6
Conservative gain from Liberal		Swing	+2.3	

General election December 1910: Radnorshire
Party	Candidate	Votes	%	±%
Liberal	Francis Edwards	2,224	50.5	+0.7
Conservative	Charles Dillwyn-Venables-Llewelyn	2,182	49.5	−0.7
Majority		42	1.0	N/A
Turnout		4,406	73.8	−0.4
Liberal gain from Conservative		Swing	+0.7	

General Election 1914–15:

Another General Election was required to take place before the end of 1915. The political parties had been making preparations for an election to take place and by July 1914, the following candidates had been selected;

- Liberal: William Lewis
- Unionist: Herbert Clark Lewis, 2nd Baron Merthyr

== Sources ==
- D Brunton & D H Pennington, Members of the Long Parliament (London: George Allen & Unwin, 1954)
- Cobbett's Parliamentary history of England, from the Norman Conquest in 1066 to the year 1803 (London: Thomas Hansard, 1808)
- The Constitutional Year Book for 1913 (London: National Union of Conservative and Unionist Associations, 1913)
- F W S Craig, British Parliamentary Election Results 1832-1885 (2nd edition, Aldershot: Parliamentary Research Services, 1989)
- J E Neale, The Elizabethan House of Commons (London: Jonathan Cape, 1949)
- W R Williams The Parliamentary History of the Principality of Wales
- Leigh Rayment's Historical List of MPs – Constituencies beginning with "R" (part 1)
