= Carlo Alfredo Piatti =

Italian cellist and composer (1822–1901)

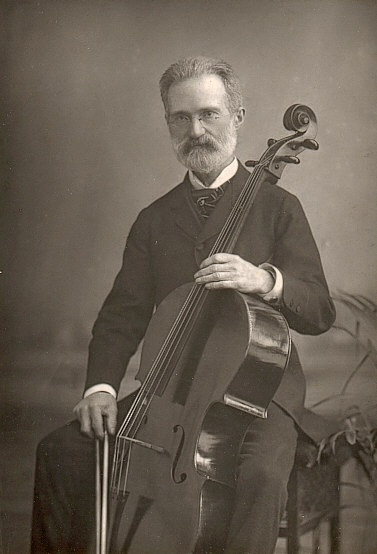
- Born: 8 January 1822; Bergamo
- Died: 18 July 1901 (aged 79); Mozzo
- Occupations: Teacher, musician

Carlo Alfredo Piatti (8 January 1822 – 18 July 1901) was an Italian cellist, teacher and composer.

== Biography ==
Piatti was born at via Borgo Canale in Bergamo and died in Mozzo, 4 miles from Bergamo.

The son of a violinist, Antonio Piatti, he originally began his studies on the violin before switching to the cello. As a cellist, he studied under his great-uncle, Gaetano Zanetti, a great cellist. After two years of studying, he joined the theater orchestra, where he played for three months - for the equivalent of ten shillings, half of which his grandfather took. After Zanetti's death, he became a pupil at the conservatorio of Milan under Vincenzo Merighi. He made his concert debut at 15 and started touring at 16. No one doubted the young virtuoso's skill on the instrument, but he did not draw large crowds. As a result, when Piatti fell ill during an engagement, he was forced to sell his cello to cover the medical costs. Franz Liszt invited him to appear as a guest performer at one of his recitals; stunned by what the boy could do on a borrowed cello, Liszt presented him with an Amati cello. Piatti went on to become one of the most celebrated cellists of his day, as popular for the pieces he wrote as for the robust and unsentimental way he performed them.

From 1838, he journeyed over Europe, playing with extraordinary success in all the important cities of the continent. In 1844 he appeared before the London public at a Philharmonic Concert.

In 1852 he premiered (and became the dedicatee of) a Sonata Duo for cello and piano, Op. 32, by William Sterndale Bennett, having been given the original manuscript of the music in the morning, studied it on a train then played it at the concert that same evening with the composer as pianist playing from memory.

He married in 1855 Mary Ann Lucy Welsh, daughter of Thomas Welsh and his wife Mary Anne Wilson.

In 1859, on the foundation of the Popular Concerts, he took up the work with which he was most intimately connected for thirty-nine seasons. He retained until 1897 the post of first cello at these famous chamber concerts, during the latter half of each series. He played a Stradivarius which now is named after him Piatti and is owned by the Mexican cellist Carlos Prieto.

In 1864, he formed a trio to tour and perform with pianist Charlotte Tardieu and violinist Camille Sivori.

In 1882, he performed Beethoven's Trio in G major at St. James's Hall, London, with Madame Wilma Neruda and Ludwig Straus and later Brahms' Quintet in F minor, where he was joined by Louis Ries and Charles Hallé

In 1894 the fiftieth anniversary of his first appearance in London was celebrated by a reception given in honour of him and his lifelong friend Joachim. He retired from public life, owing to a severe illness, in 1897, and until his death at Bergamo on the 19th of July 1901 divided his time between his native town and Cadenabbia.

Piatti composed two cello concertos, one cello concertino, six cello sonatas, lieder for voice and cello accompaniment, and cello solos, as well as a cello method.

His pupils were many, and included Robert Hausmann.

A marble bust of Piatti, attributed to "Giacomo Manzoni of Bergamo", is in the collection of the Royal Academy of Music, to whom it was gifted by his daughter in 1909.

== Compositions ==
=== Cello solo ===
- Capriccio on a theme from Niobe by Giovanni Pacini, Op. 22 for cello solo (on the aria, cavatina, I tuoi frequenti palpiti)
- Twelve Caprices for cello solo, Op. 25

=== Cello and piano ===
- Air Baskyrs, Op. 8
- Am Meer, Serenade, Ave Maria (Franz Schubert / Alfredo Piatti)
- Canto di primavera for cello and piano
- Canzonetta for cello and piano
- Danza moresca for cello and piano
- Elegia per la morte di Cavour for cello and piano
- Entreaty / Supplication / Bitte for cello and piano
- Follia su un'aria di Geminiani for cello and piano
- Gagliarda for cello and piano
- Impromptu sopra un'aria di Purcell nella "Regina indiana" for cello and piano
- Introduction and Variations on a theme from Donizetti's Lucia di Lammermoor for cello and piano, Op. 2
- Introduzione e Allegro alla Spagnuola for cello and piano
- La Bergamasca for cello and piano, Op. 14
- Gita in gondola / La Danza for cello and piano
- Les Fiancés for cello and piano, Op. 7
- Mazurka Sentimentale for cello and piano, Op. 6
- Notturno for cello and piano, Op. 20
- Ossian's song, Ballad for cello and piano
- Passetemps Sentimental, Op. 4
- Pioggia d'Aprile for cello and piano
- Sérénade Italienne for cello and piano, Op. 17
- Siciliana for cello and piano, Op. 19
- Souvenir de la Sonnambula for cello and piano, Op. 5
- Tarantella for cello and piano, Op. 23
- Tema e Variazioni for cello and piano
- The race – La corsa for cello and piano
- Rimembranze del "Trovatore" di Verdi, Op. 20

=== Cello and orchestra ===
- Air Baskyrs Op.8
- Entreaty / Supplication / Bitte
- Serenata for two cellos and orchestra
- Theme and Variations

=== Two cellos ===
- Elegia per la morta di Anton Rubinstein
- Serenata for two cellos and orchestra
- Serenata for two cellos and piano

=== Four cellos ===
- ln Vacanza (On Holiday) (1891)

=== Transcriptions of works by other composers ===
- Brahms: Twenty-One Hungarian Dances (1881)
- Locateli: Sonata in D Major
- Haydn: Sonata in C Major
- Valentini: Sonata in E Major
