= Jane Shirreff =

Scottish-born soprano

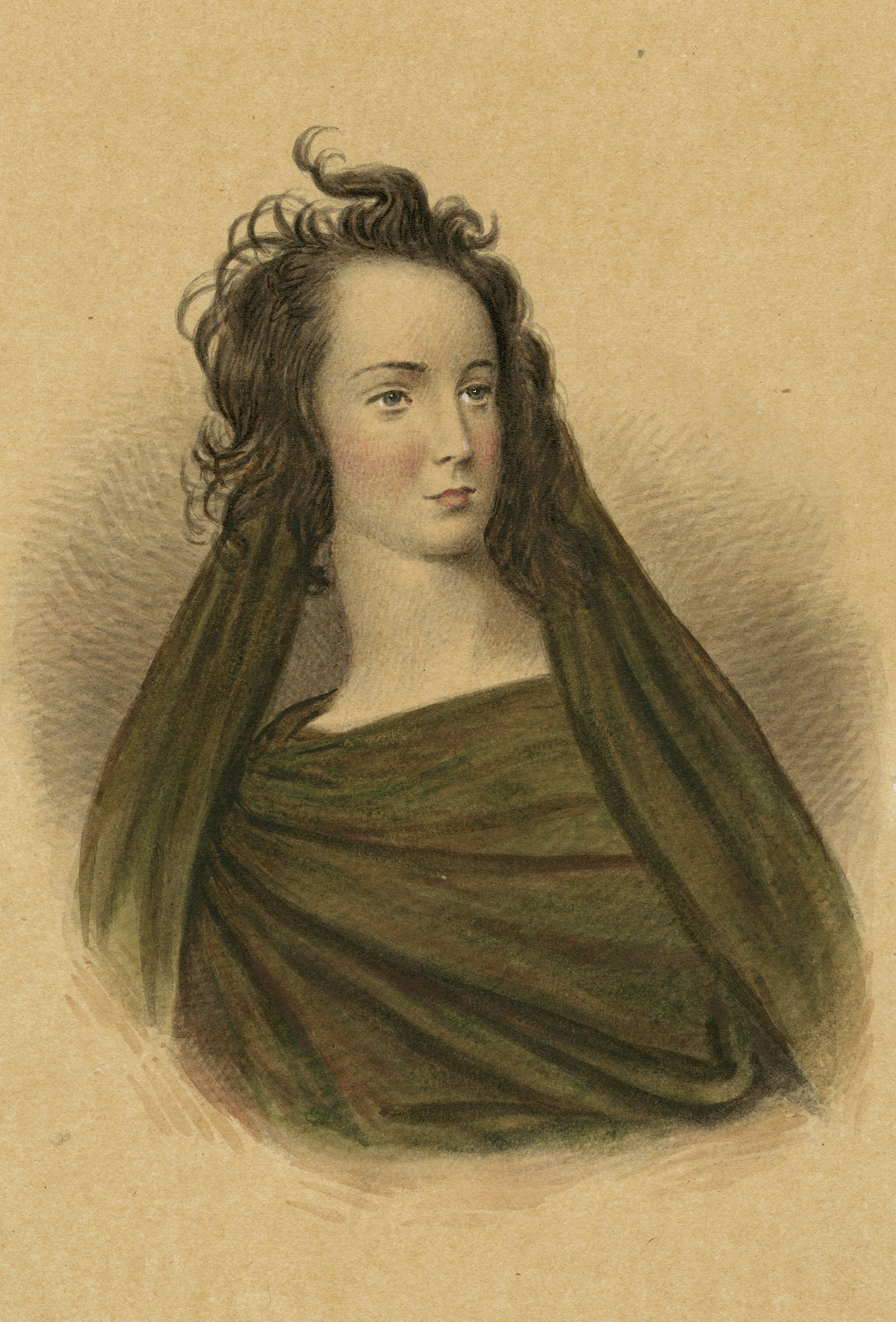
- Miss Shirreff as one of the witches in Macbeth
- Born: 1808
- Died: 1883 (aged 74–75)
- Occupation: Soprano

Jane Shirreff (1808-1883) was a British soprano opera singer. She was described as America's "most admired prima donna between the days of Mrs. Wood and those of Louisa Pyne".

== Early life and education ==
As a young woman, Shirreff taught singing and sang in church choirs.

On Shirreff's debut in 1832, the newspapers reported that she was from London and that her father was a tailor. She had relatives in the Royal Navy. She was a pupil of Tom Welsh.

== Career ==
=== London ===
Shirreff was initially known as a ballad singer. Her first appearance in opera was as Mandane in Artaxerxes at Drury Lane Theatre in 1831. Looking back at the season the following year, The Weekly Dispatch reported that "All the phrases to be found in the puffing vocabulary were exhausted in announcing the appearance of Miss Shirreff. The display of red letters in the bills was truly alarming".

She then took a contract with Covent Garden Theatre; the newspapers reported that she had been offered £80 a night by Drury Lane, and was likely to receive £100 a night at Covent Garden. Her other parts included Polly in The Beggar's Opera, which was described as "peculiarly adapted for her chaste and expressive style of singing". In 1832, The Age wrote that she had "saved" Covent Garden Theatre. Tom Welsh acted as her agent at this stage of her career.

Leander Zerbini wrote a song for her, a ballad called We Loved; or, Fortune, Titles, and Beauty, which was advertised as "Composed expressly for Miss Shirreff, who possesses the sweetness of Waylett and Stephens, soul of Love, execution of Paton, science of Pasta, and finish of Malibran". In 1832 her portrait was engraved from a drawing by Abraham Wivell.

Queen Victoria drew her in the character of Clara in Michael William Balfe's The Siege of Rochelle.

Shirreff's many roles on the London stage included:

- Viola in a musical version of Twelfth Night at Covent Garden, 1833.
- Violetta de Trepolo in James Planché's The Red Mask at Drury Lane, 1834.
- Peki in The Bronze Horse at Drury Lane, 1836.
- Camilla in The Corsair at Drury Lane, 1836.
- Eola in The Mountain Sylph at the English Opera House, 1836.
- Amilie in the première of Amilie, or the Love Test, 1837.

In 1836 her salary at Drury Lane was reported to be £25 per week. Later the same year, Shirreff, with other women actors, spoke out against not having been paid by the theatre manager, Alfred Bunn. She broke her connexion with Drury Lane early in 1837.

In the summer seasons Shirreff toured to cities such as Cork or Edinburgh.

She performed at the Concerts of Antient Music.

=== America ===
In 1838 she went to America as part of a company put together by Henry John Wallack on behalf of his brother, James William Wallack, of the National Theatre, New York, with John Wilson, Arthur Seguin and Ann Childe Seguin. Shirreff left an archive through which her tour can be followed. Performances started at the National Theatre and the troupe then toured to Boston, Providence, Washington, Baltimore and Philadelphia. Shirreff was unwell at times during the tour, and missed 32 performances of the total 199 because of illness. The company's other productions included La sonnambula, in which Shirreff sang Amina, Fra Diavolo and Cinderella. The operatic season of 1838-39 was a critical and financial success. Shirreff earned $13,098 from the tour. Karen Ahlquist writes that "she seems to have delighted everyone". The public also valued her purity and virtue. Hostility did develop between Shirreff and other members of the troupe, however.

Following the 1838-39 season, Shirreff and Wilson organised summer concert tours in 1839 through New York State, Ohio, Michigan, and to Canada. Towns and cities in which they performed included Albany, Utica, Syracuse, Buffalo, Toronto, Kingston and Montreal. Shirreff's records show that she met other artistes during the tour, including Ellen Tree. She travelled with her dog and her mother, as well as a friend, Mary Blundell, and they mostly used steamboats to travel between cities. These summer tours went well, but when Shirreff and Wilson returned to Baltimore to begin the new operatic season, this was much less successful and has been called "an unmitigated disaster", partly because of the difficult economic climate. However, Shirreff was said to have made a fortune from the American trip.

She was praised for her acting as well as her voice.

== Personal life ==
Following the tour, Shirreff married and ceased to sing professionally. Her marriage took place in June 1841 in Chelsea, London and was to Thomas Walcot. She continued to sing in her private life.

Shirreff died in December 1883.
