= Love meter =

Love meter, love tester, or love teller may refer to:

- Hand boiler, a glass sculpture used as an experimental tool to demonstrate vapour-liquid equilibrium, or as a collector's item to whimsically "measure love"
- Love Tester, a novelty toy made by Nintendo that tries to determine how much two people love each other
- Love tester machine, a type of amusement personality tester machine, which upon receiving credit tries to rate the subject's sex appeal, love abilities or romantic feelings for someone
- Questionnaire, a research instrument that consists of a set of questions (or other types of prompts) for the purpose of gathering information from respondents through survey or statistical study

== See also ==
- Amilie, or the Love Test, an 1837 opera by William Michael Rooke
- Annie's Coming Out, (also known as A Test of Love), a 1984 Australian drama film
- The Love Test, a 1935 British romantic comedy film
