= William Henry Fry =

American composer, music critic, and journalist (1813–1864)

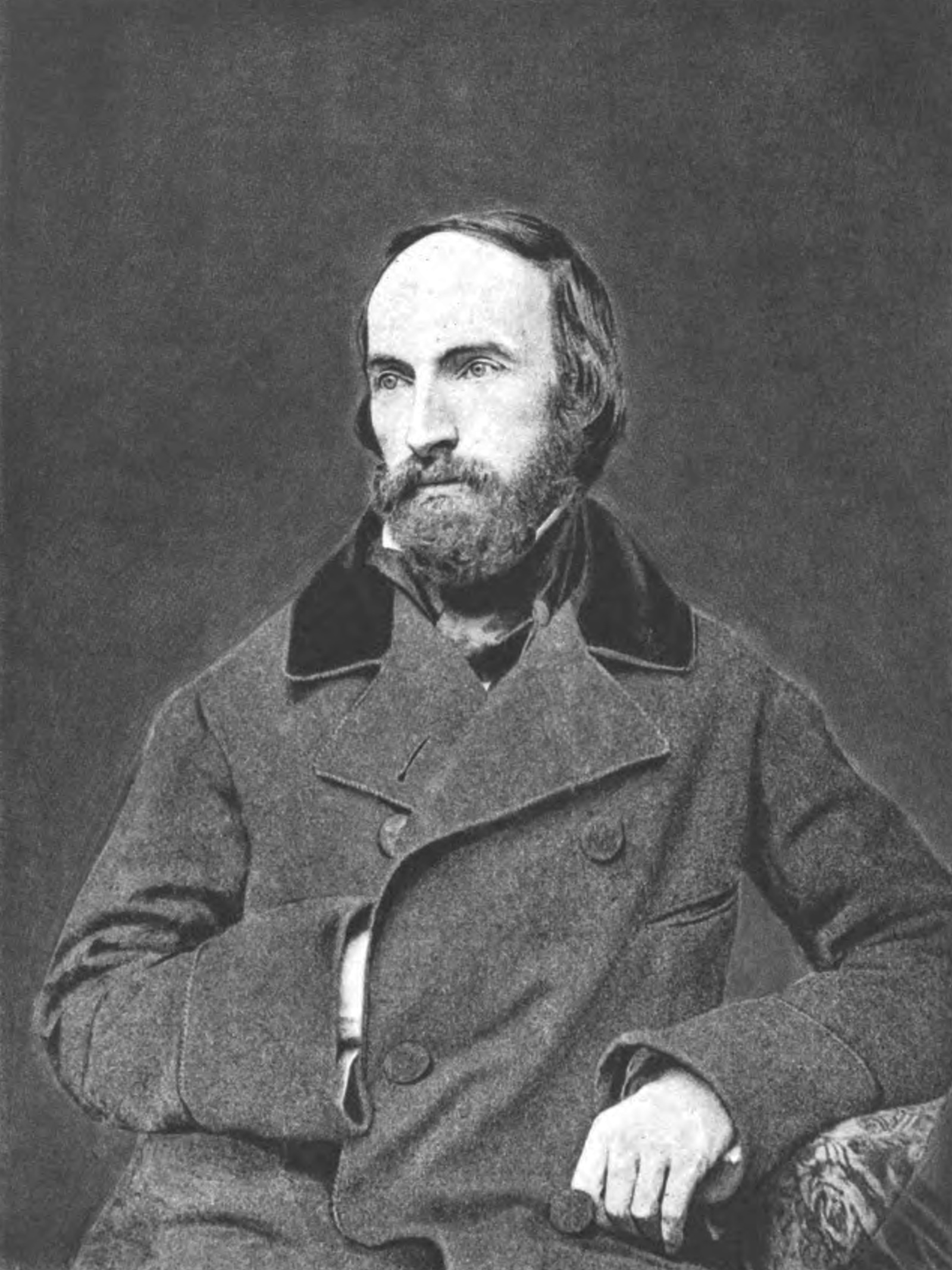
Portrait photograph of William Henry Fry

William Henry Fry (August 10, 1813 – December 21, 1864) was an American composer, music critic, and journalist. Fry was the first known person born in the United States to write for a large symphony orchestra, and the first to compose a publicly performed opera. He was also the first music critic for a major American newspaper, and he was the first known person to insist that his fellow countrymen support American-made music.

== Biography ==
William Henry Fry was born on August 10, 1813, in Philadelphia. His father, William Fry, was a prominent printer and, along with Roberts Vaux and Robert Walsh, ran the National Gazette and Literary Register, a major American newspaper at the time—edited by Robert Walsh from 1821 to 1836. William Henry had four brothers—Joseph Reese, Edward Plunket, Charles, and Horace Fry. He was educated at what is now Mount Saint Mary's University in Emmitsburg, Maryland. After returning to Philadelphia to work for his father, he studied composition with Leopold Meignen, a former band leader in Napoleon Bonaparte's army and the music director of the Musical Fund Society orchestra. He eventually became secretary of the Musical Fund Society.

Fry's operatic compositions include Aurelia the Vestal, Leonora (based on the 1838 play The Lady of Lyons), and Notre-Dame of Paris (based on the 1831 novel by Victor Hugo). Leonora was a very successful production at its premiere in 1845 and second run the following year. Leonora is also significant as it was the first grand opera written by an American composer. The opera was written for Ann Childe Seguin who took the title role when it opened.

After a six-year sojourn in Europe (1846–52), where he served as foreign correspondent to the Philadelphia Public Ledger, Horace Greeley's New York Tribune, and The Message Bird (later known as the New York Musical World and Times), Fry gave a series of eleven widely publicized lectures in New York's Metropolitan Hall. These dealt with subjects such as the history and theory of music as well as the state of American classical music.

In addition to his operas, Fry wrote seven symphonies that have extra-musical themes. His Santa Claus: Christmas Symphony of 1853, which was very well received by audiences but derided by many of Fry's rival critics, may be the first orchestral use of the saxophone, invented barely a decade before. His 1854 Niagara Symphony, written for Louis Jullien's orchestra, uses eleven timpani to create the roar of the waters, snare drums to reproduce the hiss of the spray, and a remarkable series of discordant, chromatic descending scales to reproduce the chaos of the falling waters as they crash onto the rocks.

Fry's other works, including Leonora (New York debut in 1858) and Notre-Dame of Paris (1864, Philadelphia), received mixed reviews along partisan lines: conservatives tended to dislike Fry's music, whereas political progressives highly enjoyed it. His other musical works included the Overture to Macbeth, the Breaking Heart, string quartets and sacred choral music.

From 1852 until his death in 1864, Fry served as music critic and political editor for the New York Tribune.

== Death ==
William Henry Fry died at age 51 on December 21, 1864, in Saint Croix in the Virgin Islands. His death was apparently from tuberculosis "accelerated by exhaustion." He is buried at Laurel Hill Cemetery in Philadelphia.

== Compositions ==
- Opera Leonora (1845)
- Santa Claus, Christmas Symphony (1853)

This piece's inaugural performance was on Christmas eve 1853 in New York City by the Juillien Orchestra, conducted by French conductor Louis-Antoine Jullien. The piece generated some controversy due to the fact that it was conveying a theme. At the time, there was an international debate between those who favored “'absolute music' (the non-representational symphonies of Mozart, Beethoven, and their ilk) and 'program music' (meant to convey a narrative or pictorial theme, as fostered by Berlioz and, eventually, Liszt and Wagner)." Fry's piece was definitely of the "program music" genre. This piece also used the newly invented soprano saxophone in what was probably its first-ever use in a symphonic work. Fry "took advantage of the musicians’ uncommon skill with evocative effects and solos for specific players named in the score, including the trailblazing saxophonist Henri Wuille and the double bass virtuoso Giovanni Bottesini.

- Hagar In the Wilderness, Sacred Symphony (1853)
- Niagara Symphony (1854)
- Stabat Mater: An Oratorio (1855)
- Overture to Macbeth (1864)
- The Breaking Heart (aka Adagio, Adagio sostenuto)

According to music historian David Mason Greene, much of Fry's musical output was lost after his death.

== Writings ==
In addition to his journalistic output, Fry wrote one book, Artificial Fish-Breeding, published in 1858.

== Modern editions ==
Fry, William Henry. "Santa Claus: Christmas Symphony (1853)." Edited by Sam Dennison. In Three Centuries of American Music: A collection of American sacred and secular music, Volume 9: American orchestral music, 1800–1879. Boston: G.K. Hall, 1992.

This edition is part of a larger multi-volume set and contains a newly copied version of the Santa Claus Symphony, based on the manuscript held in the Fleisher Collection, now at the Free Library of Philadelphia. The introduction includes a short biography of Fry as well as specific information about the composition of the symphony and its critical reception. Also included in the volume are orchestral works by Fry's musical contemporaries: Philip Trajetta, Charles Zeuner, Anthony Philip Heinrich, George Frederick Bristow, Dudley Buck and Fry's teacher Leopold Meignen.

Fry, William Henry. "Christmas Symphony." Transcribed for concert band by Charles Fernandez. Los Angeles: Trone Music, 2013.
