= Eliakim Littell =

American editor & publisher (1797–1870)

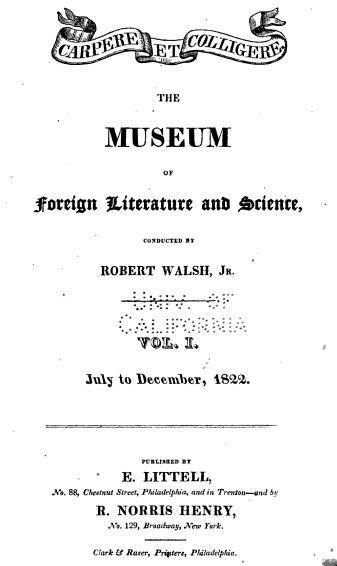
The Museum v.1, 1822

Eliakim Littell (2 January 1797 – 17 May 1870) was an American editor and publisher, the founder of a long-lived periodical named Littell's Living Age (1844–1941).

== Biography ==
Littell was born in Burlington, New Jersey. He moved to Philadelphia, Pennsylvania, in 1819, and established a weekly literary paper entitled the National Recorder, whose name he changed in 1821 to the Saturday Magazine. In July 1822, he again changed it to a monthly called the Museum of Foreign Literature and Science, which was edited during the first year by Robert Walsh, and subsequently by himself and his brother Squier (born in Burlington, New Jersey, 9 December 1803; died in Philadelphia, Pennsylvania, 4 July 1886). After conducting this with great success for nearly 22 years, Littell moved to Boston, Massachusetts.

In Boston, in April 1844, he began Littell's Living Age, a weekly literary periodical, published from an office at the corner of Bromfield and Tremont Streets. In 1855, he began the publication in Boston of the Panorama of Life and Literature, a monthly. Littell was the author of the "Compromise Tariff", which was advocated by Henry Clay and carried through the U.S. Congress during the administration of President Jackson. Littell died in Brookline, Massachusetts.

== Family ==
His brother Squier Littell was a physician who eventually became surgeon to the Wills Ophthalmic Hospital of Philadelphia 1834–1864. His brother John Stockton Littell (born in Burlington, New Jersey, in 1806; died in Philadelphia, Pennsylvania, 11 July 1875) was an author who published a sketch of the Life, Character, and Services of Henry Clay and other pieces. Eliakim Littell's grandfather of the same name was a captain in the American Revolution, and did good service in the defence of Springfield, New Jersey, 4 June 1780. The brothers' cousin William Littell (born in New Jersey about 1780; died in Frankfort, Kentucky, in 1825) was a lawyer, a member of the Kentucky bar, who for many years reported the decisions of the court of appeals of Kentucky. In addition to his legal publications, he wrote Festoons of Fancy in Essays, Humorous, Sentimental, and Political, in Prose and Verse.

== Works ==
- The Museum of Foreign Literature and Science. v.1 (1822).
- Eclectic Museum of Foreign Literature, Science and Art. v.2 (1843).
- Living Age. v.60 (1859); v.99 (1868). Full run available online from Library of Congress, v.1-59, 61-227 (1844–1900)

== Images ==
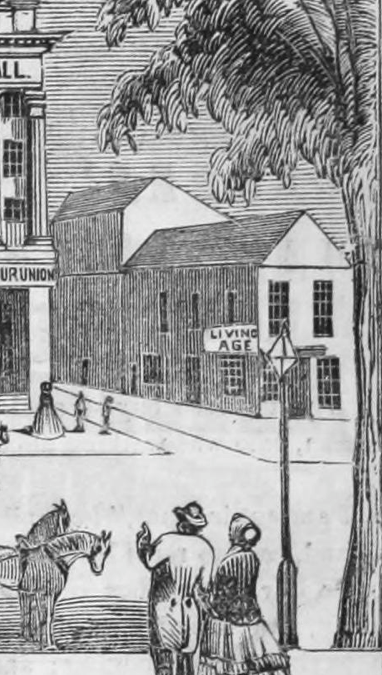
Living Age office, Bromfield St., Boston, 1853

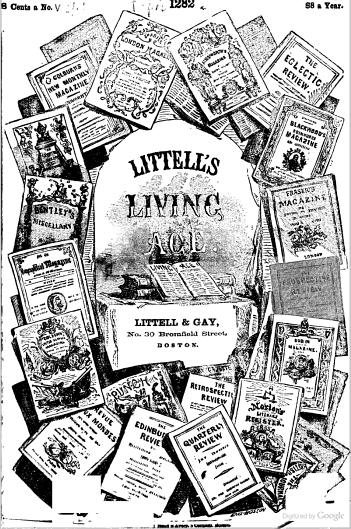
Littell's Living Age, 1868
