= Giuseppe Brentano =

Italian architect, operating in eclectic styles (1862–1889)

Giuseppe Brentano (April 14, 1862 in Milan – December 31, 1889 in Milan) was an Italian architect, operating in eclectic styles.

== Biography ==
His father was an architect. In 1883, Giuseppe Brentano enrolled in the Istituto tecnico superiore (Politecnico) of Milan, where he studied under Camillo Boito and his assistant, Luca Beltrami. The next year, he moved to Venice, and won the Gori-Ferroni Competition, held in Siena, Italy, with a proposal for a classical Exhibition palace, and a medieval style church. He completed a diploma in architecture in 1887. Among his first projects was a Funeral Chapel. He designed the Anglican church in Cadenabbia, choosing a gothic style. He also won a prize for his designs for the facade of the Duomo of Milan, which had been rushed to completion in the beginnings of 19th century using plans mainly derived by Carlo Buzzi (1585-1658). Brentano's first design, like Buzzi's, included two bell towers.

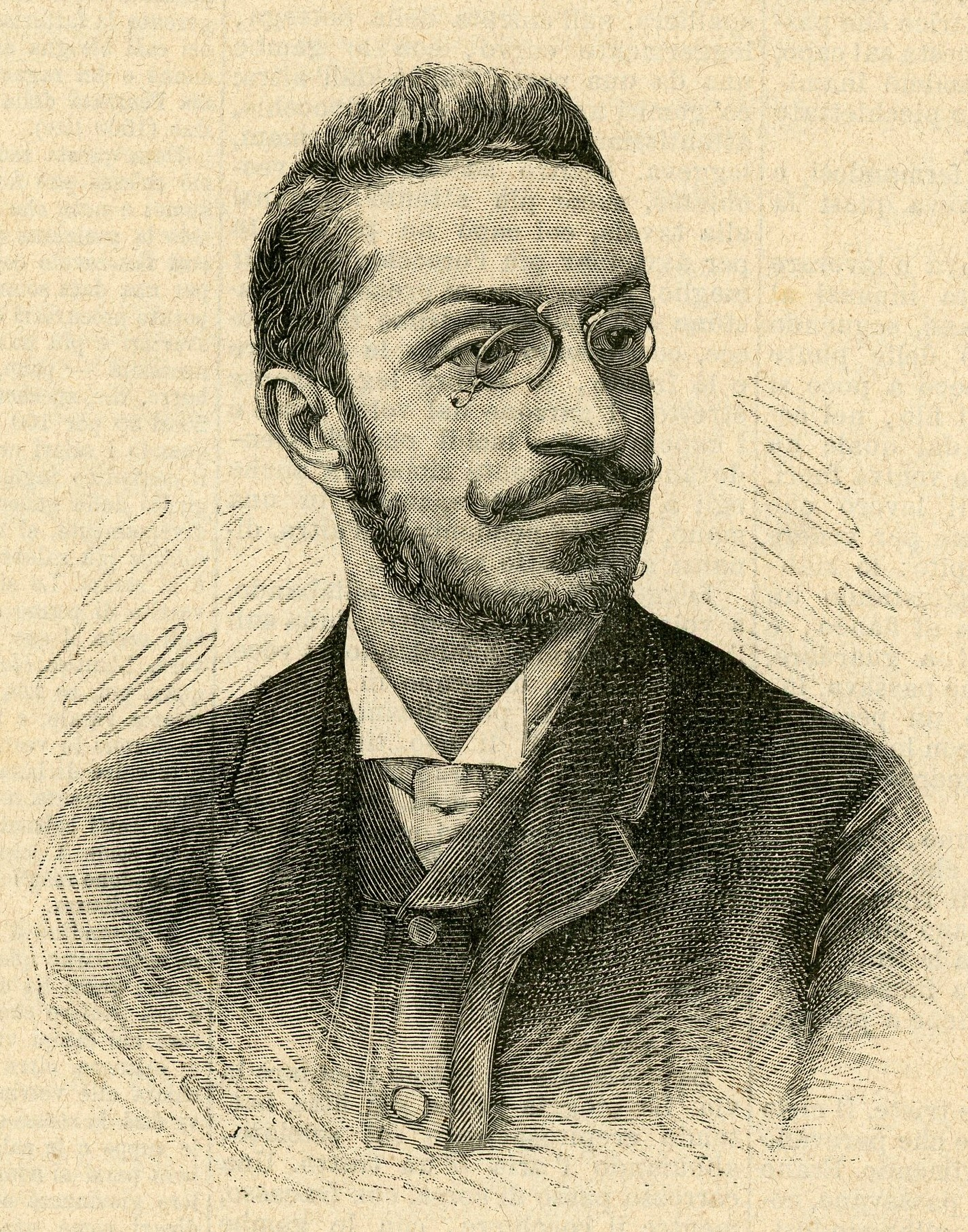
Giuseppe Brentano

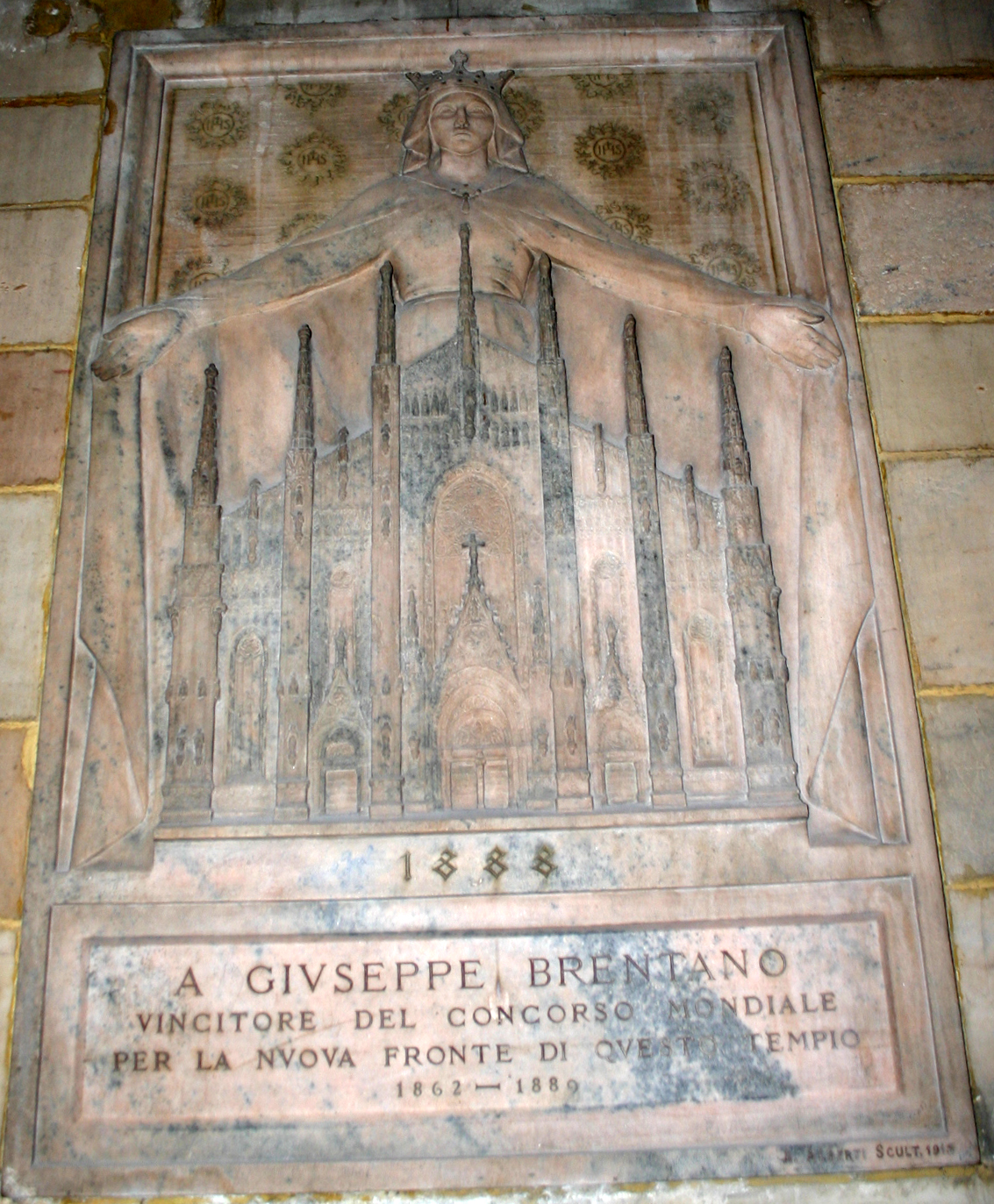
Monument to Brentano in Cathedral of Milan

For that competition, he traveled extensively through Europe, visiting similar gothic buildings. In his travels, he encountered Friedrich von Schmidt in Vienna and the son of Viollet-le-Duc in Paris, reviewing designs and building plans. He submitted a second revised plan in a second competition and was awarded the project (1888). A wooden model of the project, built in collaboration with Giovanni Brambilla, can be seen in the Cathedral. While he had already begun to order materials for construction, his suddenly death led to abandoning the project. Milanese have always been averse to modernization of the architectural elements of their medieval Cathedral. Only the bronze portals on the facade by Ludovico Pogliaghi were built.
