= Griante =

Commune in Lombardy, Italy

Griante Griant (Lombard)
- Comune
- Comune di Griante
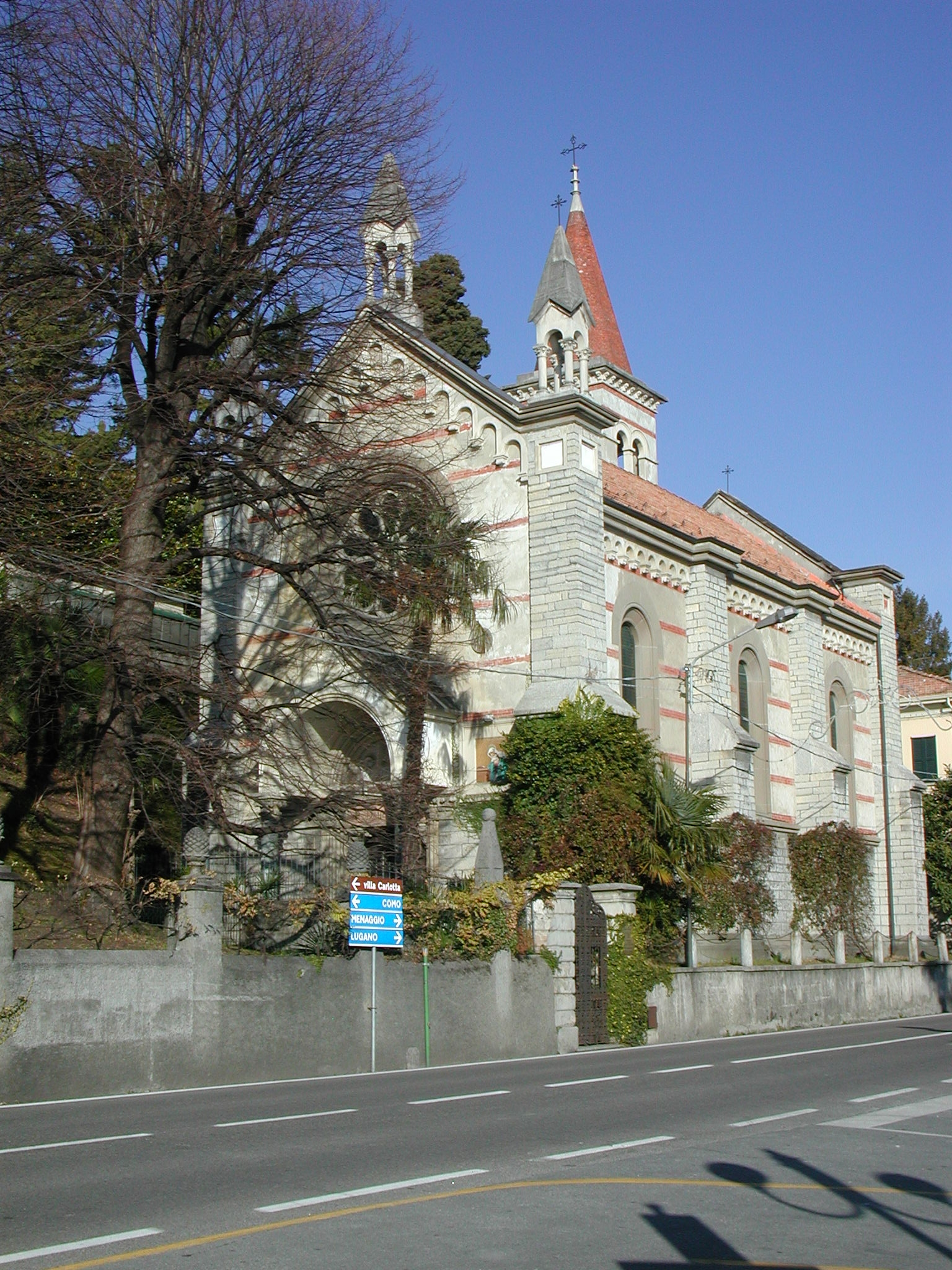
- Anglican church
- Coat of arms
- Location within Italy Location within Lombardy
- Coordinates: 46°0′N 9°14′E
- Country: Italy
- Region: Lombardy
- Province: Como (CO)
- Frazioni: Cadenabbia

Government
  - Mayor: Paolo Mondelli

Area
  - Total: 6.1 km^{2} (2.4 sq mi)
- Elevation: 274 m (899 ft)

Population (31 December 2010)
  - Total: 636
  - Density: 100/km^{2} (270/sq mi)
- Demonym: Griantesi
- Time zone: UTC+1 (CET)
  - Summer (DST): UTC+2 (CEST)
- Postal code: 22011
- Dialing code: 0344

Griante (Comasco: Griant [ɡriˈ(j)ãːt]) is a comune (municipality) in the Province of Como in the Italian region Lombardy, located on the western shore of Lake Como, about 25 kilometres (16 mi) northeast of Como, between Menaggio (to the north) and Tremezzo. Griante also borders the communes of Bellagio and Varenna on the other side of the lake. The commune of Griante itself is situated some 50 metres above lake level, on a wide plateau. The portion of the commune sitting on the lake, where the community's tourist industry is situated, is known as Cadenabbia di Griante.

In 1853, Giulio Ricordi built a mansion, Villa Margherita Ricordi (Coordinates 45.994321N 9.238636E), in Cadenabbia di Griante on the shore of Lake Como, where Giuseppe Verdi visited and is thought to have composed some parts of his opera La Traviata.

Griante's main sites include the Anglican Church of the Ascension.
