= Mary Anne Wilson =

English opera singer (1802–1867)

Mary Anne Wilson (also Mary Ann Wilson; 1802 – 13 December 1867) was an English opera singer.

== Life ==
Wilson was born in Berwick-upon-Tweed, and was taught singing by Thomas Welsh. Her first appearance in public at Drury Lane Theatre in January 1821, as Mandane in Thomas Arne's Artaxerxes, caused a sensation, as much for her youth and looks as for her fresh sweet voice and brilliant singing. She remained there until July, "about 65 nights" according to John Genest, "wonderfully attractive." Other roles included Rosetta in Arne's Love in a Village, Clara in The Duenna and Lady Gayland in James Kenney's False Alarms.

After an equally successful provincial tour, she went the next year to Italy. The premature strain of her early exertions, however, soon ruined her health, and then destroyed her voice. But her short career was very lucrative, and in the year of her debut she made the unprecedented sum of £10,000.

== Family ==
She married on 9 June 1827 Thomas Welsh, at St Augustine, Watling Street, London. They had a daughter, Mary Ann Lucy Welsh (born 1828); she married the cellist Alfredo Piatti in 1855. Welsh died in Brighton in 1848; his widow died, of pleurisy and exhaustion, in Goudhurst, Kent, on 13 December 1867.
