= Ann Childe Seguin =

British and American opera singer and music teacher

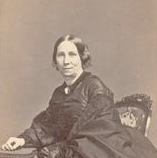
- Anne Childe
- Born: 20 April 1811; London
- Died: 1888 (aged 76–77); New York
- Education: Royal Academy of Music

Ann(e) Childe Seguin (1811–1888) was a British and American opera singer who was part of the Seguin Troupe in America. Her best known role was as the lead in The Bohemian Girl.

== Life ==
Ann Childe was born in London on 20 April 1811. Her parents were the painter James Warren Childe and Ann, née Banfield. She met her future husband at the Royal Academy of Music in London where she later taught. She was a soprano while he was a bass. Childe was taking the lead in as Catherine in Lord Burghersh's opera of the same name in 1830. Her future husband, Arthur Seguin (1809–1852) sang in support as Ismael. They were married in 1834 which was the same year as she sang at the Westminster Abbey festival. Her début at Covent Garden was playing Marcellina in Fidelio the following year. She appeared as Donna Anna at Drury Lane in a version of Don Giovanni in English.

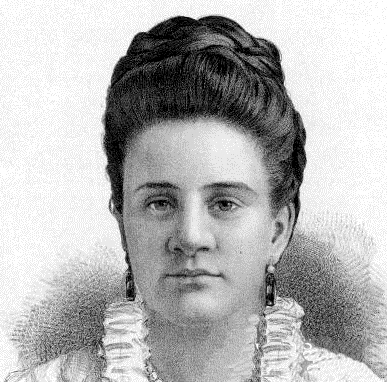
An engraving of Ann Childe Seguin

They went to America at the invitation of John Lester Wallack with their three children. Her début was in the Barber of Seville at the National Theatre in New York in 1839. She and Arthur appeared with Jane Shirreff and the Scottish tenor John Wilson. The Seguins formed their own company that performed operas in English. Their troupe visited both Montreal and Toronto in Canada with W. H. Latham of the Theatre Royal in Drury Lane starting in 1839 and continuing over the next ten years. They sang excerpts from a number of operas including La Sonnambula, Il Matrimonio Segreto, and La Gazza ladra The role that she was best known for was Arline, the lead role in Balfe's ballad opera The Bohemian Girl.

Seguin's role within the company included directing rehearsals and settling disputes between the players. She also organised new productions of which there were many. The troupe organised the American premiers of several operas including three that were written in America. The first American grand opera, Leonora, was written by the American composer William Fry for Seguin to take the title role. Their son who was known as Edward S. C. "Ned" Seguin was also a singer. He married Zelda Wallace who had been one of Ann's singing students. They married in 1867 and had a son before Edward died in 1879.

The Seguin operatic troupe which had initially consisted of four to six singers went out of fashion in the late 1840s when audiences wanted their operas not in English but in the original language.

Seguin made her last appearance in an opera in 1852 at the Broadway Theatre in New York. After her husband's death from tuberculosis she again taught music, although she always took a role in opera production. She died in New York in August 1888.

== Legacy ==
Anne Childe Seguin is valued because she was the first English opera singer to make America her home. She also left her notes which give an important insight into the introduction of opera into America. One of her students, who also became her daughter-in-law, was contralto Zelda Seguin Wallace.
