= Cam' Ye by Atholl =

Scottish folk song

"Cam' Ye by Atholl" is a Scottish Jacobite folk song. The words were written by James Hogg and it is traditionally sung to a tune by Neil Gow, Junior, the son of Nathaniel Gow. The song, which celebrates the Jacobite rising of 1745, takes the form of a "gathering song" to recruit Jacobites and makes reference to many of the places and people associated with the rebellion.

Hogg wrote in "Songs, by the Ettrick shepherd" (1831) that he was surprised it had become so popular; he had "dashed down the words at random" after being given the tune by Gow and considered it "one of his worst".

Cam' Ye by Atholl was chosen by Queen Victoria to be performed for her by John Wilson during her visit to Taymouth Castle in 1842.

Recordings of the song have been included in albums by The Corries ("Those Wild Corries", 1966), The Tannahill Weavers ("Are Ye Sleeping Maggie", 1976), Kenneth McKellar ("Songs of Jacobite Risings", 1996), Gaberlunzie ("Superstition", 2005) and Alastair McDonald ("Songs Around Scotland", 2007).

It is listed in the Roud Folk Song Index as #7287, including variants titled as "I hae ae bit son".

== Lyrics ==
Cam' ye by Athol, lad wi' the philabeg,
Down by the Tummel, or banks of the Garry?
Saw ye the lads, wi' their bonnets an' white cockades,
Down from their mountains to follow Prince Charlie.

Chorus:
Follow ye, follow ye, wha wadna follow ye?
Lang have you lov'd us an' trusted us fairly!
Charlie, Charlie, wha wadna follow thee?
King o' the Highland hearts, Bonnie Prince Charlie!

I hae but ae son, my gallant young Donald;
But if I had ten, they should follow Glengarry;
Health to MacDonald and gallant Clanranald,
For these are the men that will die for their Charlie!

(Chorus)

I'll go to Lochiel, and Appin, and kneel to them;
Down by Lord Murray and Roy of Kildarlie;
Brave Mackintosh, he shall fly to the field wi' them;
These are the lads I can trust wi' my Charlie!

(Chorus)

Down by thro' the Lowlands, down wi' the whigamore,
Loyal true Highlanders, down wi' them rarely;
Ronald and Donald drive on wi' the braid claymore,
Over the necks o' the foes o' Prince Charlie!

(Chorus)
