= John Wilson (singer) =

Scottish singer

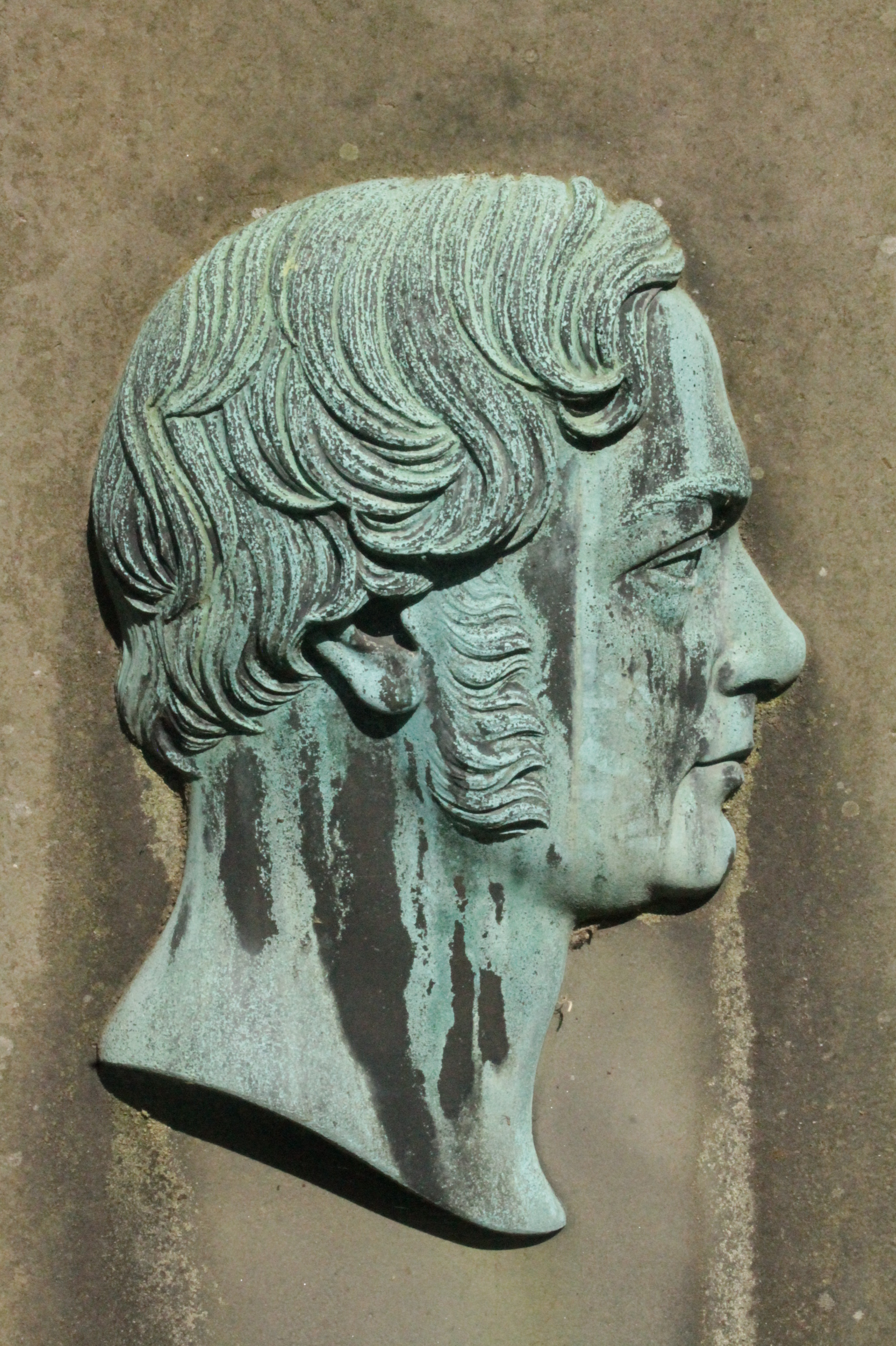
Memorial to John Wilson, Dean Cemetery

John Wilson (1800–1849) was a Scottish singer.

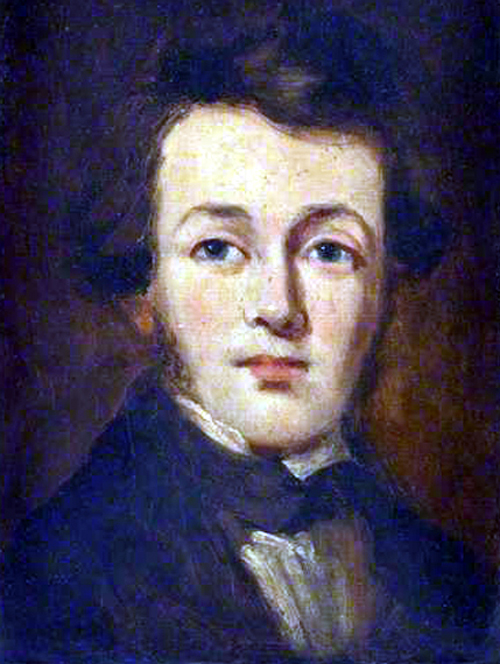
John Wilson, portrait c.1830

== Life ==
The son of John Wilson, a coach-driver, he was born in Edinburgh on 25 December 1800. The family lived at 4 South Princes Street (later rebuilt as the Balmoral Hotel).

At the age of ten he was apprenticed to a printing firm, and then engaged by the Ballantyne brothers, where he helped to set up typeface for the Waverley Novels. During the building of Abbotsford he was one of the armed messengers who had to ride weekly to fetch money to pay the workmen. He took up music, studied under John Mather and Benjamin Gleadhill of Edinburgh, and was a member of the choir of Duddingston parish church during the ministry of John Thomson.

For some time Wilson was precentor of Roxburgh Place relief church, Edinburgh, where his tenor voice drew great crowds, and from 1825 to 1830 he held the same post at St. Mary's Church, Edinburgh. After this he concentrated on music teaching and concerts. He studied singing in Edinburgh under Finlay Dun, and afterwards in London under Gesualdo Lanza and Domenico Crivelli, taking harmony and counterpoint lessons from George Aspull. In March 1830 he appeared in Edinburgh as Harry Bertram in Guy Mannering, and was subsequently engaged in other operas—notably in Michael William Balfe's, in some of which he created the principal part—at Covent Garden and Drury Lane. His acting was, however, considered stiff, and he abandoned the stage to become an exponent of Scottish song. From 1838 to 1840 he was in America appearing with Jane Shirreff, Edward and Ann Childe Seguin. Wilson appeared before Queen Victoria at Taymouth Castle in 1842 when he performed Cam' Ye by Atholl.

Wilson's Scottish song entertainments, on both sides of the Atlantic, were successful financially. He died of cholera at Quebec on 8 July 1849. He is buried there in the Mount Vernon Cemetery. David Kennedy later restored his tomb there.

== Memorials ==
Two memorials exist to Wilson in Edinburgh.

Firstly, a memorial to three singers, including Wilson, at the Regent Road entrance to Calton Hill. Secondly a huge obelisk in Dean Cemetery "erected by friends".

== Works ==
Wilson published an edition of The Songs of Scotland, as sung by him at his Entertainments on Scottish Music and Song, London, 1842, 3 vols.; and A Selection of Psalm Tunes, for the use of the Congregation of St. Mary's Church, Edinburgh (1825), in which appears the anonymous popular tune "Howard", generally attributed to him. He composed songs, notably "Love wakes and sleeps", and at his performances introduced a number that were unclaimed, but were attributed to him.

== Notes ==
Attribution

This article incorporates text from a publication now in the public domain: Lee, Sidney, ed. (1900). "Wilson, John (1800-1849)". Dictionary of National Biography. Vol. 62. London: Smith, Elder & Co.
