= Robert Walsh (diplomat) =

American diplomat (1784–1859)

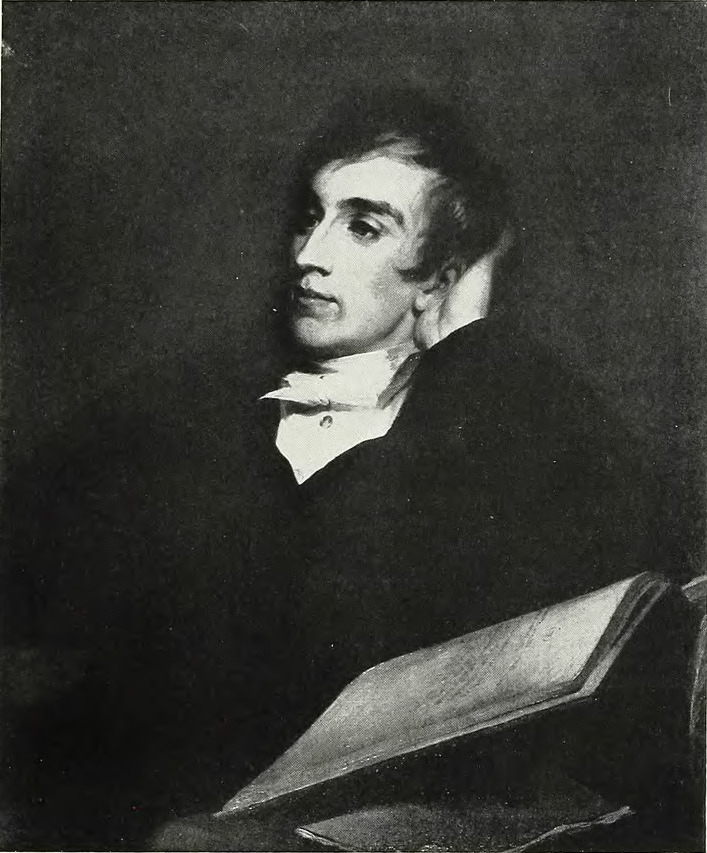
- Born: 1784; Baltimore
- Died: February 7, 1859 (aged 74–75)
- Occupation: Diplomat, journalist, writer

Robert Walsh, Jr. (1784 – February 7, 1859) was an American publicist and diplomat.

== Education and Europe ==
Robert Walsh was born in Baltimore, Maryland in 1784.

He was one of the first students to enter Georgetown College. He graduated in 1801 and began his law course. During a two-year tour of Europe, he contributed several articles on the institutions and laws of the United States to the Paris and London papers.

== Bar and literature ==
Returning to the United States in 1808, he was admitted to the bar. In 1811 he established at Philadelphia the American Review of History and Politics, the first American quarterly review. Thereafter, he devoted himself entirely to literature.

== Reacting to the U.S. in the European press and his publications ==
His "An Appeal from the Judgments of Great Britain respecting the United States of America" (1819) was an important contribution to the political literature of the era. In the "Appeal," Walsh defended the United States from British critics who denounced the continuation and expansion of slavery in the United States. In formulating his response to British critics, Walsh relied on information gather from former president James Madison. In his letters to Walsh, Madison denounced slavery, overplayed Southern whites' efforts to rein in slavery's growth, and downplayed Southern whites' actions that led to slavery's rapid growth and expansion in the South. Like many other Southern whites, Walsh blamed Great Britain for establishing slavery in the United States. But the Missouri Crisis dramatically changed Walsh's opinions on slavery in the United States and Southern white slaveholders. Later that year, Walsh published his widely read pamphlet "Free Remarks on the Spirit of the Federal Constitution, the Practice of the Federal Government, and the Obligations of the Union, Respecting the Exclusion of Slavery from the Territories and New States" (Philadelphia, 1819). In "Free Remarks," Walsh called for a complete prohibition on slavery's expansion in the United States, expecting that such an action would force Southern states to begin adopting gradual abolition policies. In 1821 he founded the Philadelphia National Gazette, a newspaper run by William Henry Fry that was devoted to politics, science, letters, and the fine arts. Walsh edited the Gazette until 1836.

== Reactions to his book Didactics ==
Lord Jeffrey said of his Letters on the Genius and Disposition of the French Government: "We must learn to love the Americans when they send us such books as this" (Edinburgh Review, 1853, 799). He published two volumes of essays, entitled Didactics, in 1836.

== Diplomatic work ==
For health reasons, Walsh moved to Paris in 1837. His house was the popular rendezvous of the learned and distinguished men of France. From 1844 to 1851 he was Consul General of the United States in Paris. Walsh remained in Paris until his death. At his death a writer declared him to be "the literary and intrinsical link between Jefferson, Madison and Hamilton and the men of the present day" (1859).
