= Palazzo delle Assicurazioni Generali (Milan) =

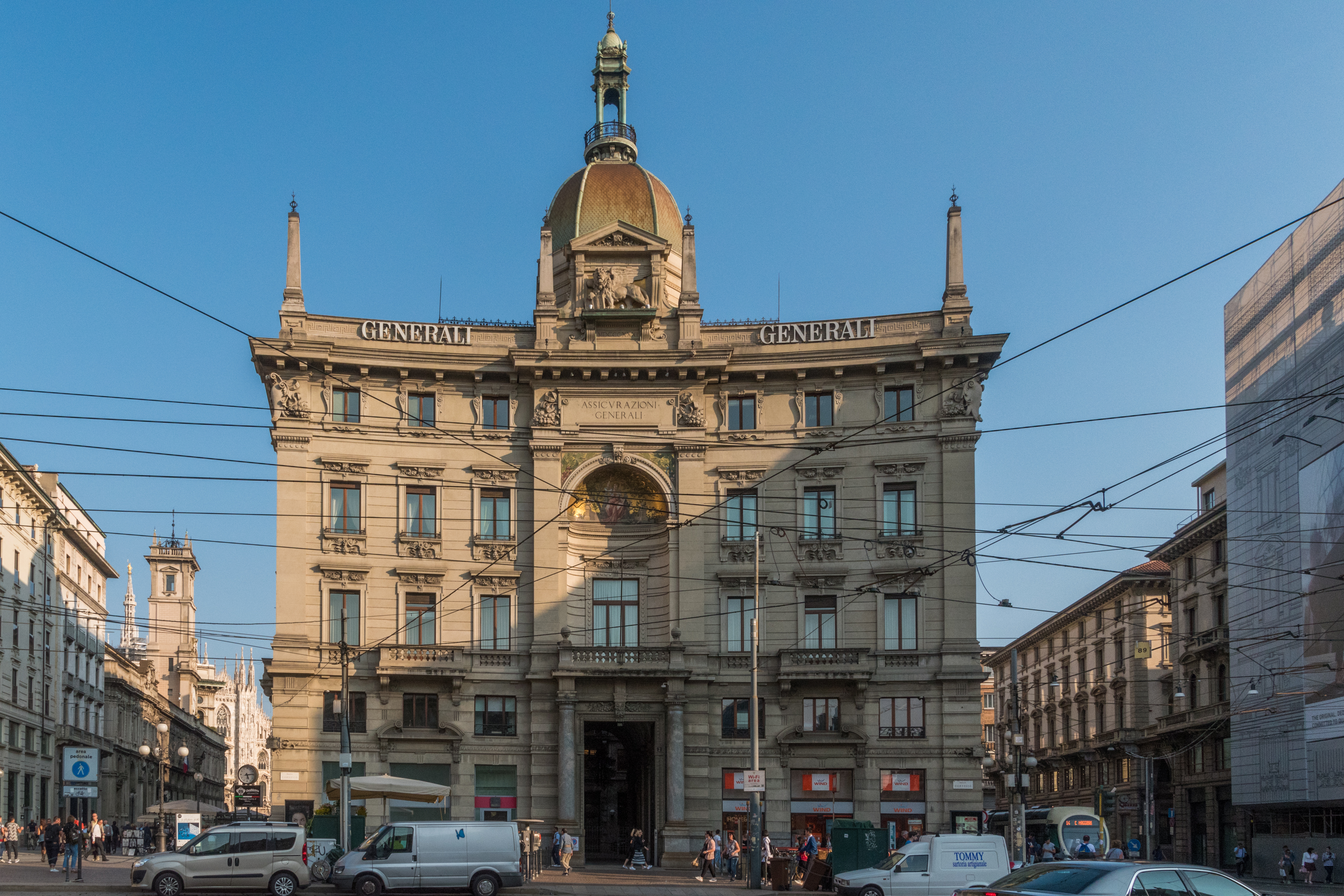
- Palazzo delle Assicurazioni Generali in 2016
- Click on the map for a fullscreen view

General information
- Architectural style: Eclectic
- Location: Milan, Italy
- Coordinates: 45°27′54.8″N 9°11′12.66″E

Design and construction
- Architect: Luca Beltrami

The Palazzo delle Assicurazioni Generali, also known as Palazzo Venezia, is a historic building situated in Piazza Cordusio in Milan, Italy.

== History ==
The building was erected between 1897 and 1899 by the Assicurazioni Generali insurance company to house its Milan headquarters. To this end, the company purchased from the municipality the plot between Via Mercanti and Via Orefici as part of the broader redevelopment plan for Piazza Cordusio, receiving final approval for the purchase in March 1897. After initially considering holding a competition among a number of Milanese architects to select the building's design, in April 1897 the company directly entrusted the commission to Italian architect Luca Beltrami in order to speed up the development process. For the project, the architect relied on the collaboration of engineer Luigi Tenenti, with whom he had already worked previously. To proceed with the construction, it was necessary to obtain a derogation from the urban planning regulation that limited the height of the building's eaves on Via Mercanti to 20 meters. The works, carried out by the firm Fratelli Alessandro e Vittorio Noseda, began with the demolition of the buildings previously on the site and ended with the successful inspection of the building in November 1898, ten months ahead of schedule, thereby allowing it to be occupied. The load-bearing structure was built in reinforced concrete, an innovative material for the time, using the system developed by François Hennebique. The building was then inaugurated on 17 September 1899.

Between 2018 and 2023, Generali promoted major renovation works on the building aimed at transforming it into a luxury hotel. The building reopened to the public as the Palazzo Cordusio Gran Meliá, operated by the Spanish chain Meliá Hotels International, in December 2023.

== Description ==
The building is the focal point of Piazza Cordusio, a major square in the centre of Milan. It features a concave façade which accommodates a large niche with mosaics, and an octagonal cupola topped by a roof lantern.

== Gallery ==
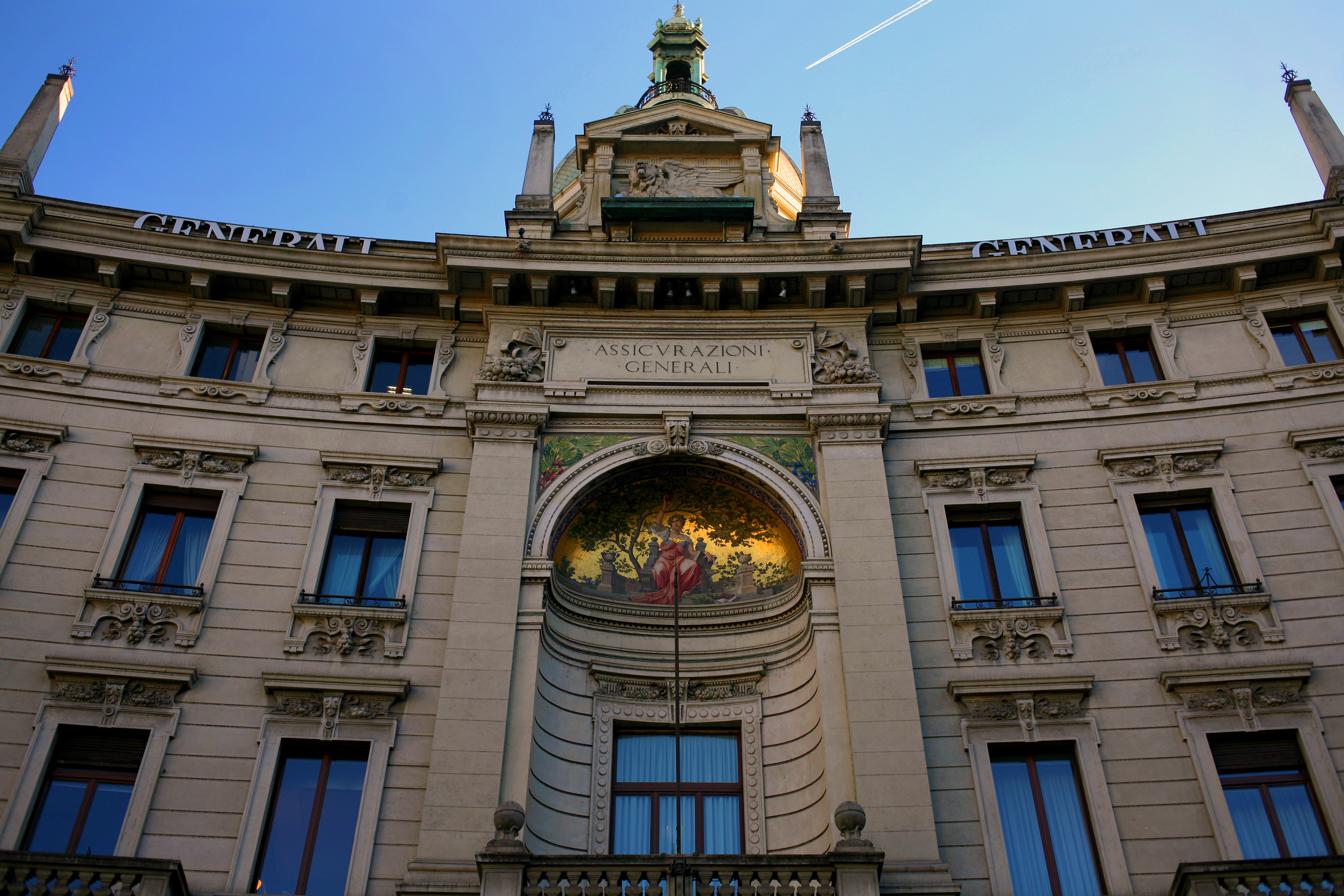

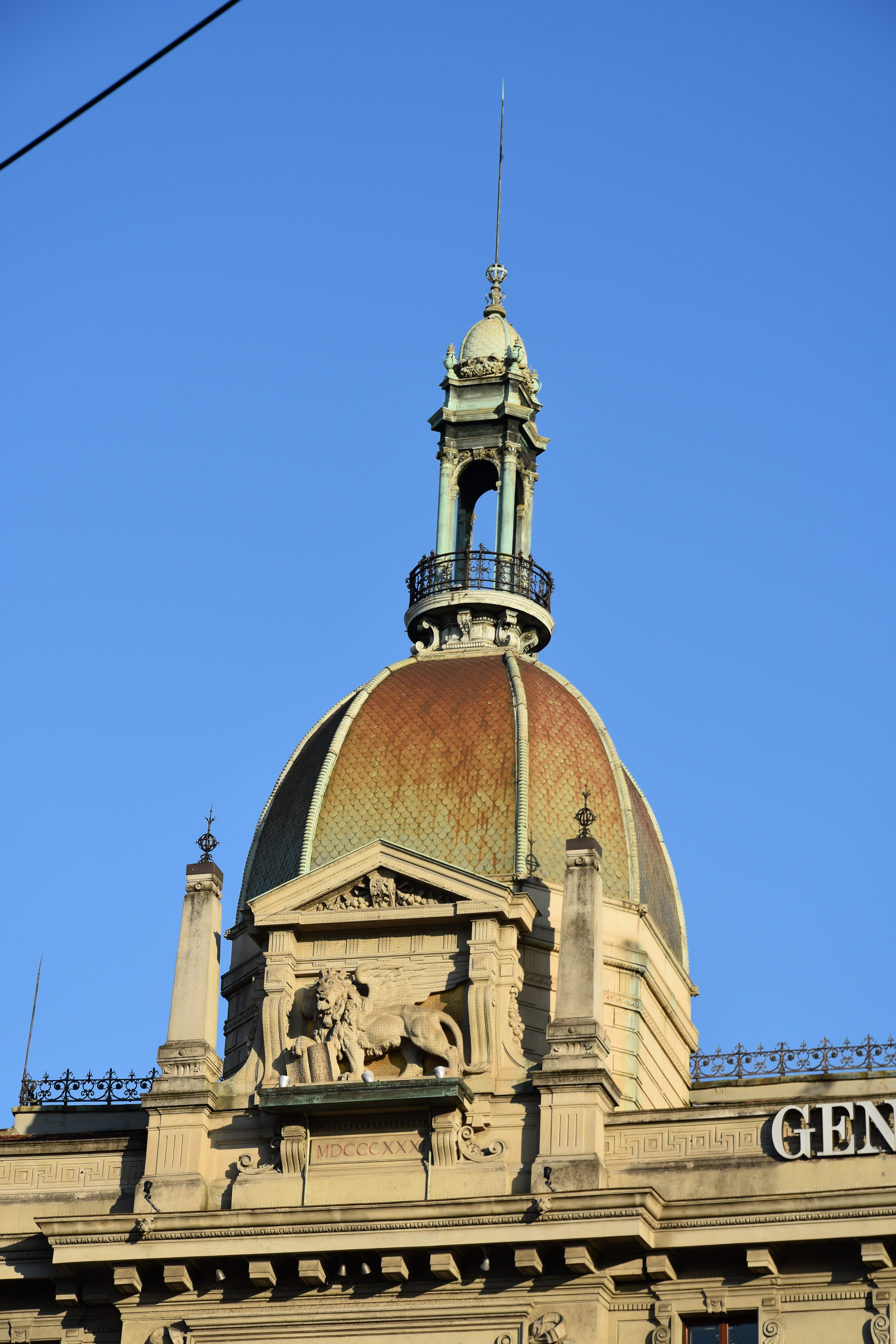

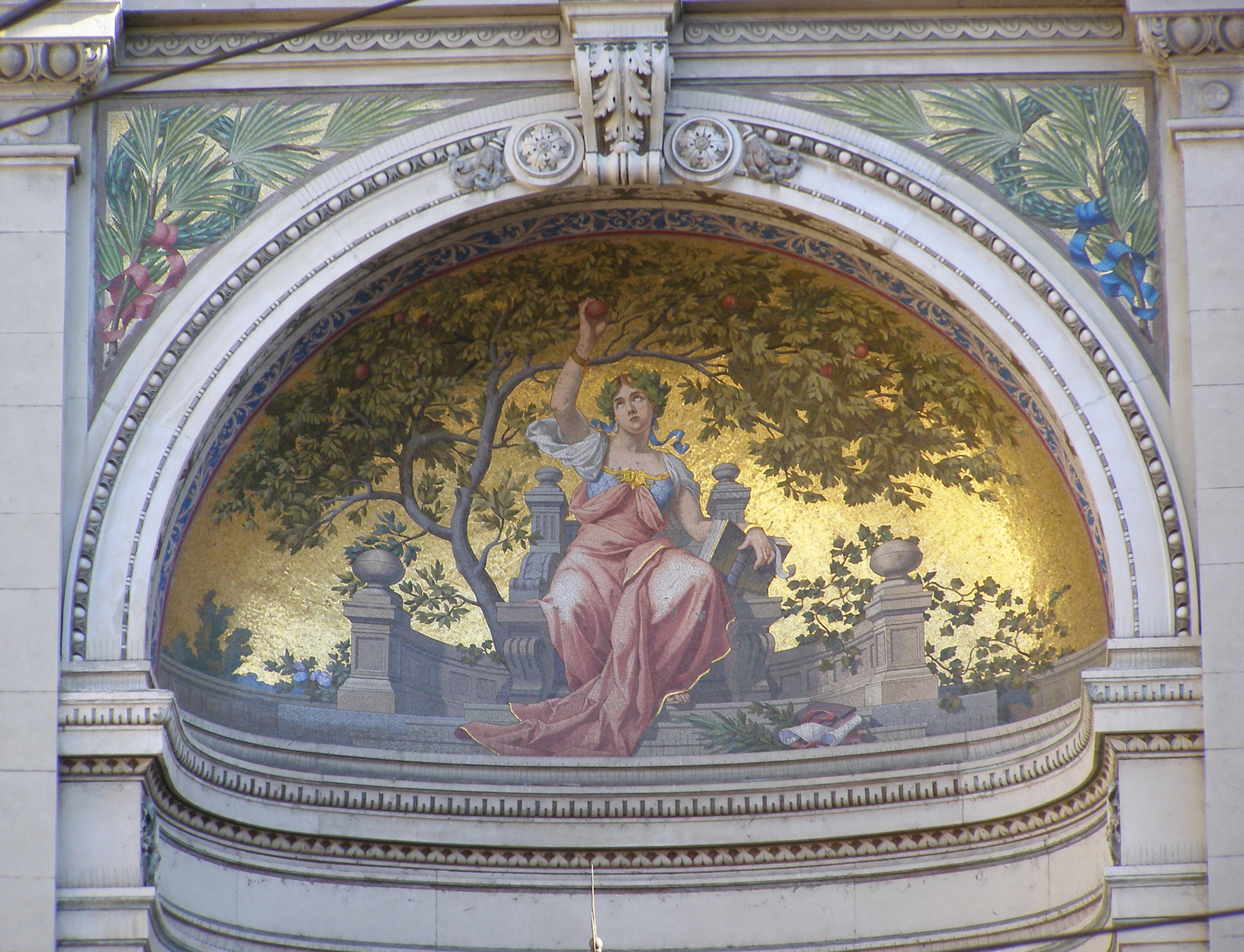
