= Church of the Ascension, Griante =

Church of the Ascension
- Chiesa dell'Ascensione (Italian)
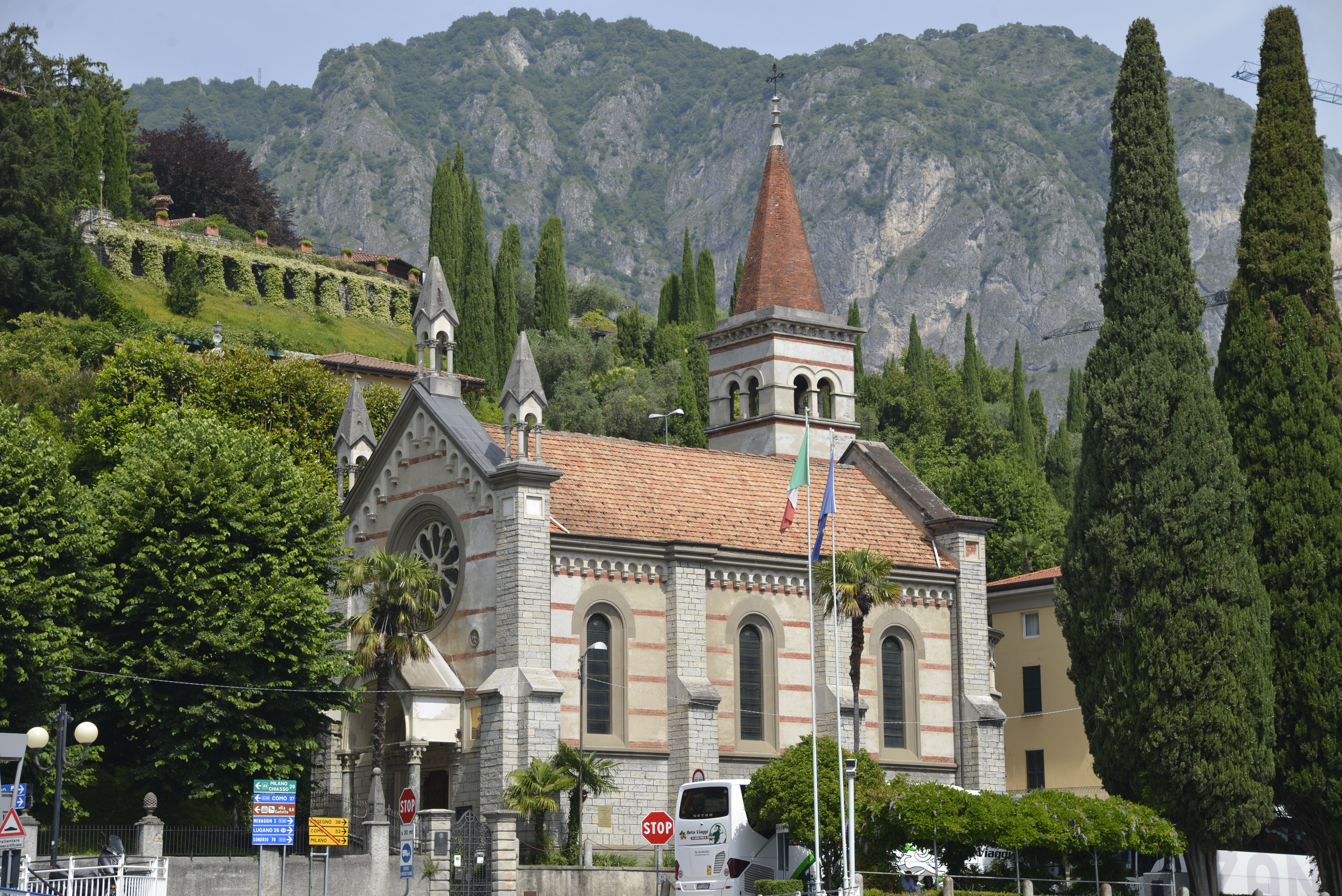
- Church of the Ascension, Griante in 2023
- Click on the map for a fullscreen view
- 45°59′28.47″N 9°14′14.5″E
- Country: Italy

Architecture
- Functional status: Active

The Church of the Ascension is an Anglican church located in Griante, Italy, on the shores of Lake Como.

== History ==
Construction works of the church, designed by architect Giuseppe Brentano, started in 1890 to meet the religious needs of the English community that had settled in Griante towards the end of the 19th century. The building was inaugurated on November 4, 1891, on the occasion of the Feast of the Ascension, becoming one of the first Anglican places of worship in Italy.

== Description ==
The church stands along the Regina national road, on the lakeside of the hamlet of Cadenabbia in the comune of Griante.

It features a Lombard neo-Gothic style inspired by 15th-century architecture. The building has a single nave with large transverse arches. The façade is characterised by a large rose window, decorative hanging arches, and spires positioned above the supporting pillars.

Inside, there are monochromatic frescoes depicting geometric patterns and groups of angels, as well as a marble pulpit and three statues representing the Crucifixion, placed beneath the arch of the presbytery.

== Gallery ==
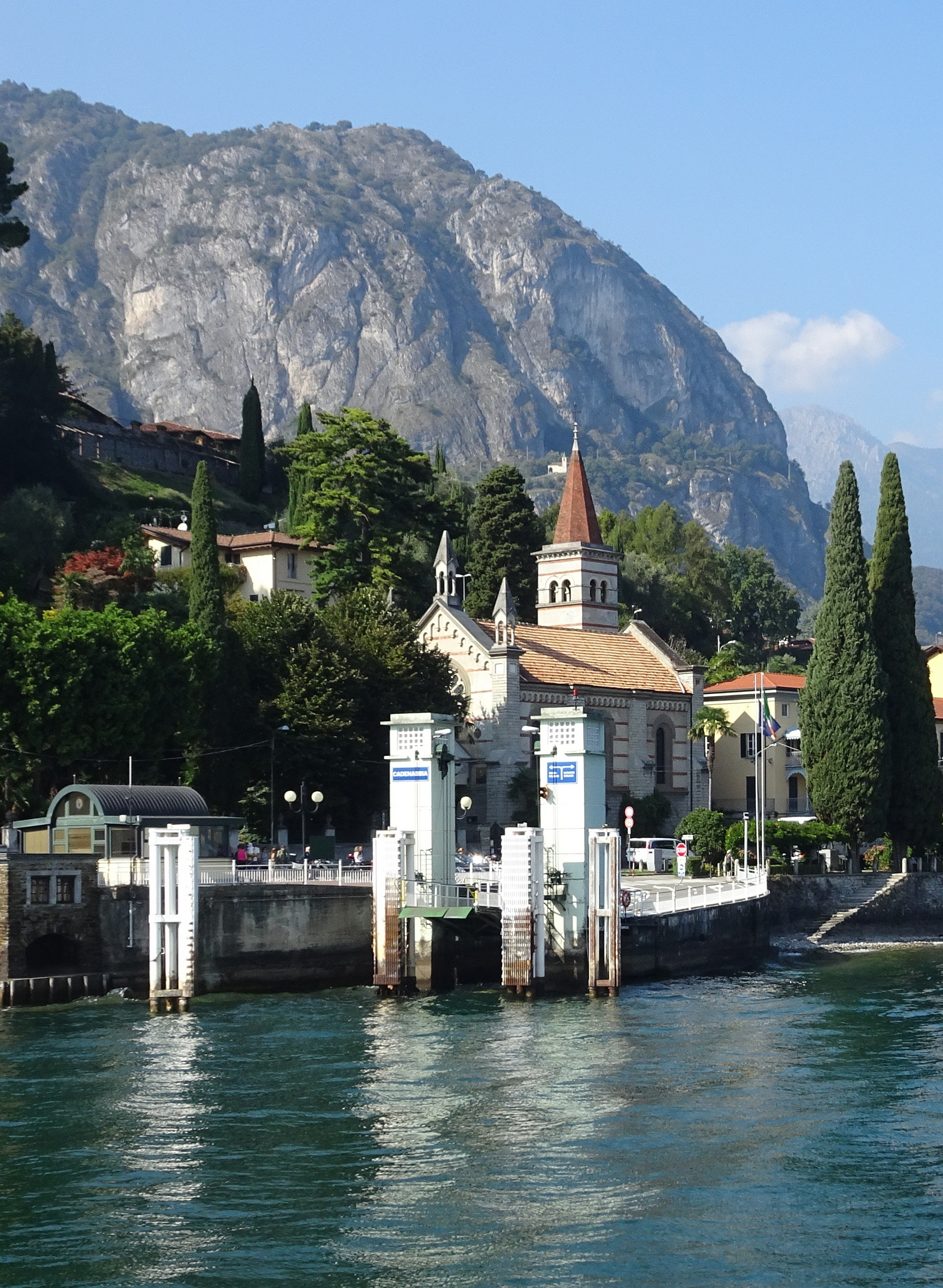

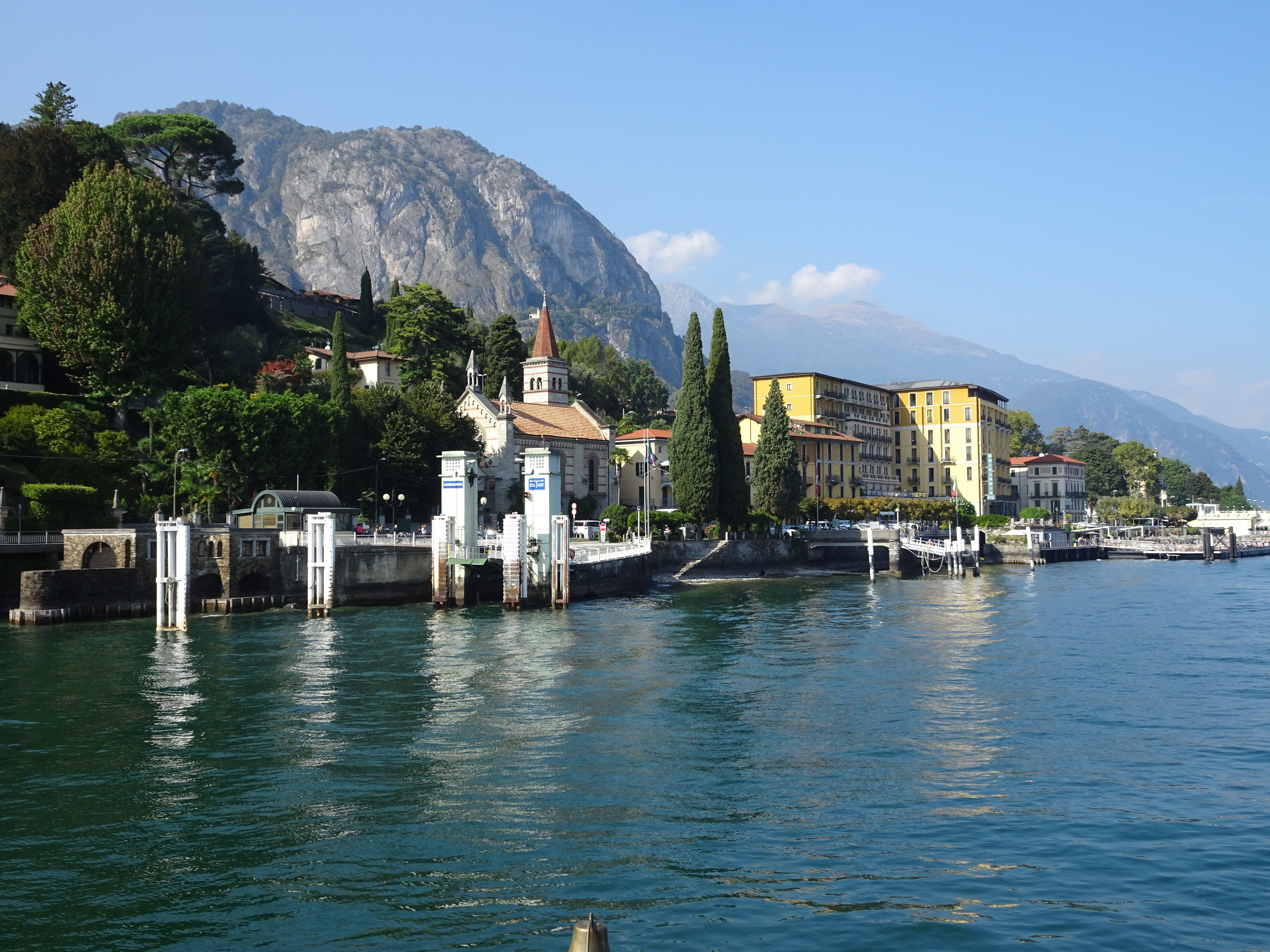

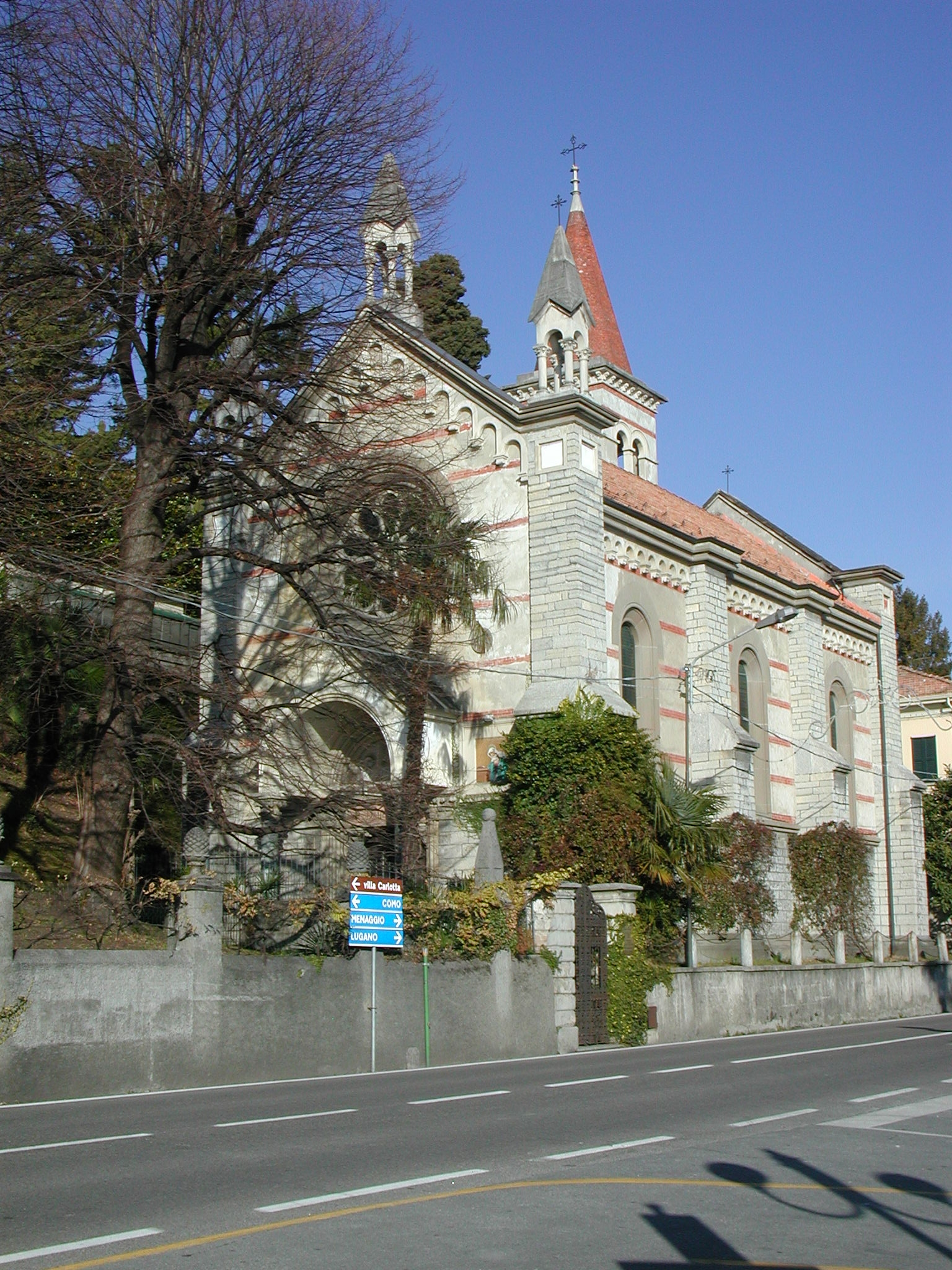
