= Luca Beltrami =

Italian architect and architectural historian

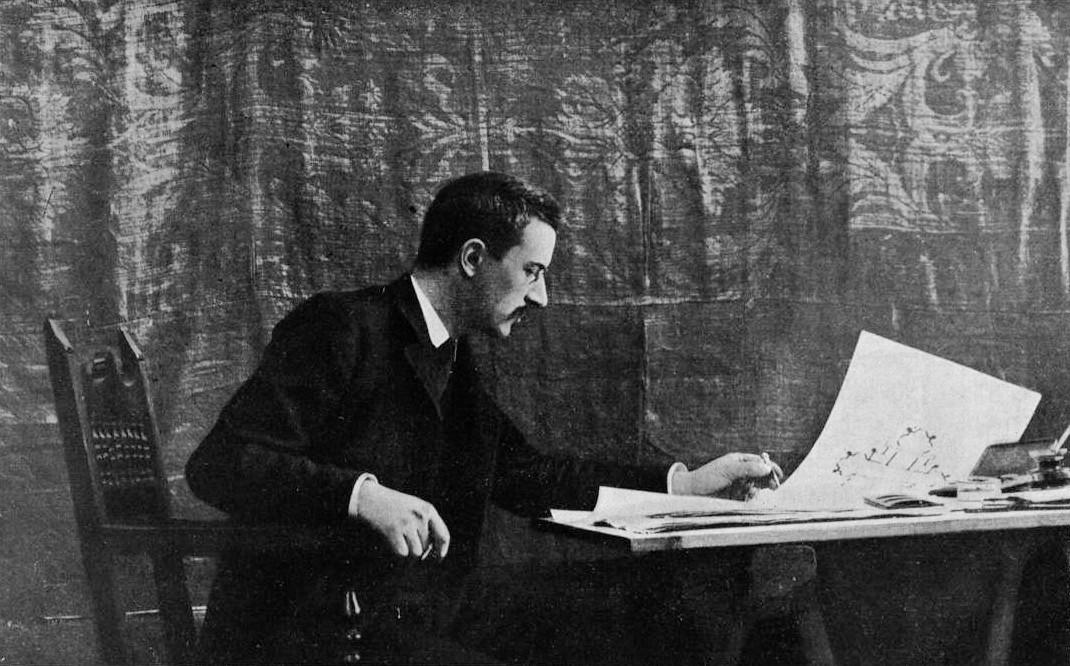
- Luca Beltrami, c. 1900
- Born: 13 November 1854; Milan, Kingdom of Lombardy–Venetia
- Died: 8 August 1933 (aged 78); Milan, Kingdom of Italy
- Occupation: Architect
- Buildings: Palazzo delle Assicurazioni Generali (Milan)

Luca Beltrami (13 November 1854 – 8 August 1933) was an Italian architect and architectural historian, known particularly for restoration projects.

== Biography ==
=== Early life and education ===
Beltrami was born in Milan, then part of the Austrian Empire. Milan would pass to Italian control when he was about five. He attended both the Polytechnic University of Milan and the Brera Academy, studying as a pupil of Camillo Boito. He graduated in 1875 and the following year enrolled at the École des Beaux-Arts, Paris, where he attended Jean-Louis Pascal's atelier, and came into contact with Charles Garnier, Gabriel Davioud and Théodore Ballu.

He was involved in work at Trocadero and at the Palace of the National Exhibitions. He was able to outscore those taking tests from the Ecole Nationale de Beaux Arts, and distinguished himself at the Salon with designs by aquaforte. He was nominated as the second in command as inspector of the works of reconstruction at the Hôtel de Ville, Paris. He collaborated with the architect Théodore Ballu in works on the Palace of Justice at Charleroi, Belgium. He also cultivated the interest in engraving that he had acquired under the painter Luigi Conconi and exhibited at the Salon of 1877.

=== Career ===
In 1880, Beltrami won the competition organised by the municipality of Milan for a monument (unexecuted) to the anti-Austrian uprising of 1848 and was appointed to the chair in Geometry and Descriptive Architecture at the Brera Academy. The following year, he also shared first prize with Carlo Ferrario in a competition organised by the Brera Academy for a new façade for Milan Cathedral.

Between 1880 and 1886, Beltrami published many studies on 15th-century buildings in Lombardy and worked on the restoration of several of them, including the Certosa di Pavia (1891) and Soncino's Castle (1882–5). In 1886, Beltrami designed and built the completion of the 16th-century Palazzo Marino, with a new façade overlooking the Piazza della Scala that reproduced the style of the original building. Here, Beltrami’s approach to restoration, based on scrupulous historical research, was synthesised with his work as an eclectic architect who, in his civic buildings, with few exceptions, was inspired by Italian 16th-century models.

In the period that followed he was mainly concerned with restoration and was in charge of the Ufficio Regionale per la Conservazione dei Monumenti (1892–5). There he sought to implement reforms in conservation policy for which he had campaigned both before and after his election to Parliament in 1892. During his period in office Beltrami restored or supervised the restoration of many of the most important monuments in Lombardy, including the church of Santa Maria delle Grazie (1892–5), completed by his pupil Gaetano Moretti (who later succeeded him), the Sforza Castle (1893–1911, both in Milan), and the Chiaravalle Abbey (1894).

His restoration of the Sforza Castle is the most important example of his method of restoration. While undertaking punctilious historical and iconographical research, he also added much new work, particularly the entrance tower, which was faithful to the style of the original. The building, however, has great urban and monumental value and retains Beltrami's concentration within it of museums and cultural institutions.

Another important project for Beltrami around this time was his participation in the competition (1887) for the façade of Milan Cathedral. Although this was won by Giuseppe Brentano, his design was inspired by Beltrami's proposal in an earlier competition (1881). Beltrami's research for the competition and his subsequent attempts to get his own scheme built after Brentano's death, led to the publication by him of several important studies on the cathedral.

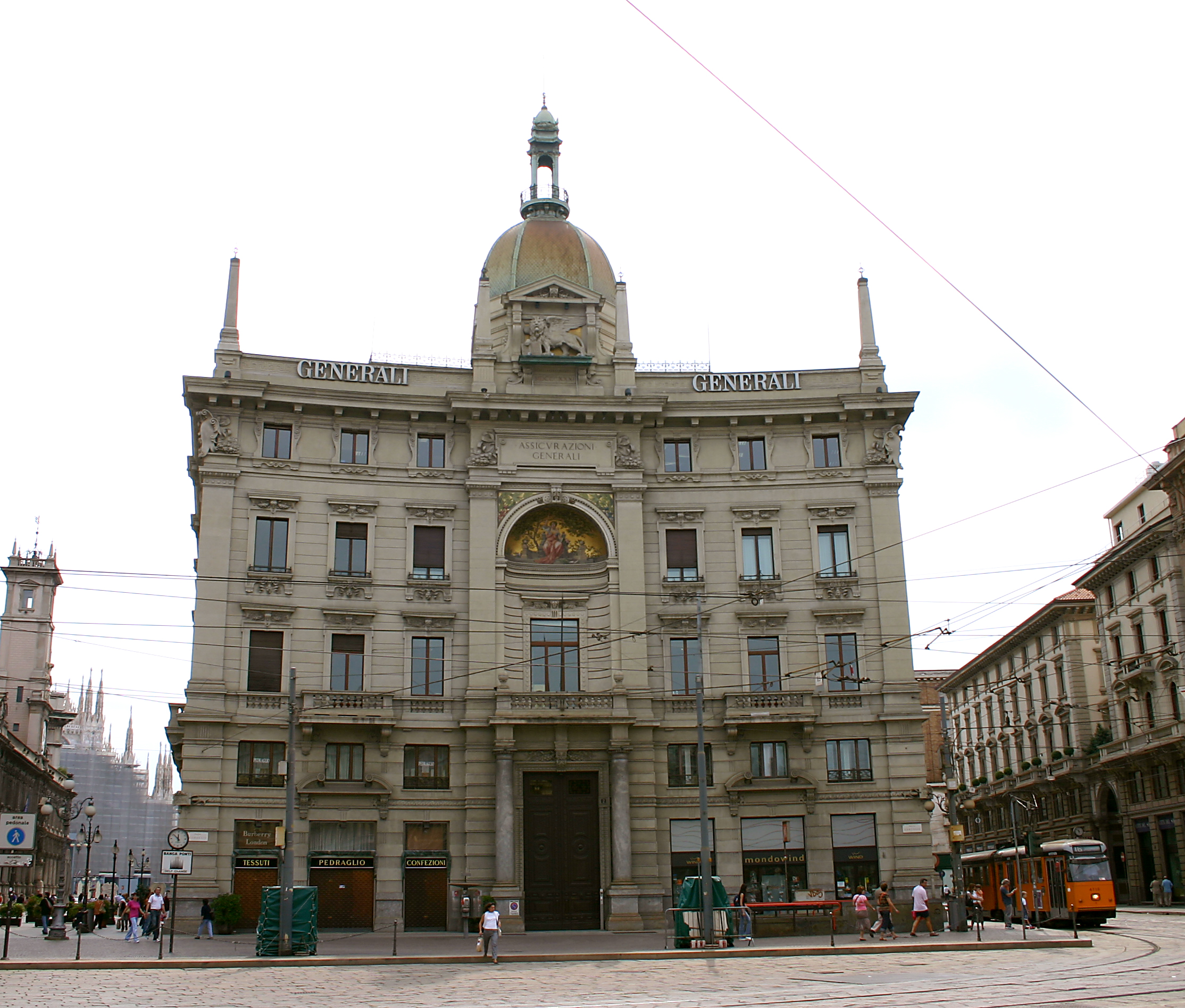
Palace of the Assicurazioni Generali, built by Luca Beltrami in 1897–1901

It was also during this period that he founded the review Edilizia moderna (1891–1914) and built the synagogue (1890–92) in the Via Guastalla, Milan, an eclectic building with orientally inspired motifs. In 1896 began a period of even more intense architectural activity. That year Beltrami designed the Palazzo per l'Esposizione Permanente di Belle Arti in Milan (1896), a Renaissance Revival building with an arched and frescoed loggia; shortly after came the Casa Bosina (1898) at Via Cappuccio 11, new buildings for the Assicurazioni Generali (1898–1900), and the Casa Dario-Biandrà (1902) in the Piazza Cordusio, at the centre of the new axis, the Via Dante, linking the cathedral and the Sforza Castle. Of these new buildings, the last two were in the Renaissance Revival style. The Casa Dario-Biandrà, in particular, is elegant and decorative but cold and somewhat anonymous.

Also in the same style were the offices of the Corriere della Sera (1904), Milan, and the series of offices built as headquarters for the Banca Commerciale Italiana at Milan (1907; Piazza della Scala, north side), Bergamo (1907), Milan (1911; Piazza della Scala, south side), Cagliari (1913), Ferrara (1913), Marseille (1920) and Rome (1915–22). Of this bank’s two Milan buildings, the earlier one is in a simple Renaissance Revival style (only the banking hall survives of the original interiors). The latter one was designed to harmonise with the adjacent Palazzo Marino (by Galeazzo Alessi, façade restored by Beltrami).

=== Later life ===
After World War I, Beltrami's influence waned, and he appeared old-fashioned. This was symbolised by the opposition of the architect Pietro Fenoglio, Director General of the Banca Commerciale Italiana, to Beltrami's project for the bank's headquarters in Rome and his support instead for the young Marcello Piacentini. From 1920, Beltrami lived mainly in Rome. His last major commissions came after the election (1927) of his old friend Achille Ratti to the Papacy as Pius XI. Vatican commissions included the reorganization of the archives and library, work on Bramante's Cortile del Belvedere, and most importantly the restoration (1928–9) of Michelangelo's dome of St. Peter's and the building of the great new Pinacoteca (1929–33). Once again in the Renaissance Revival style, the Pinacoteca, with its exquisitely studied proportions, simple, elegant and cold, was the last great homage to the Italian architecture of the 19th century.

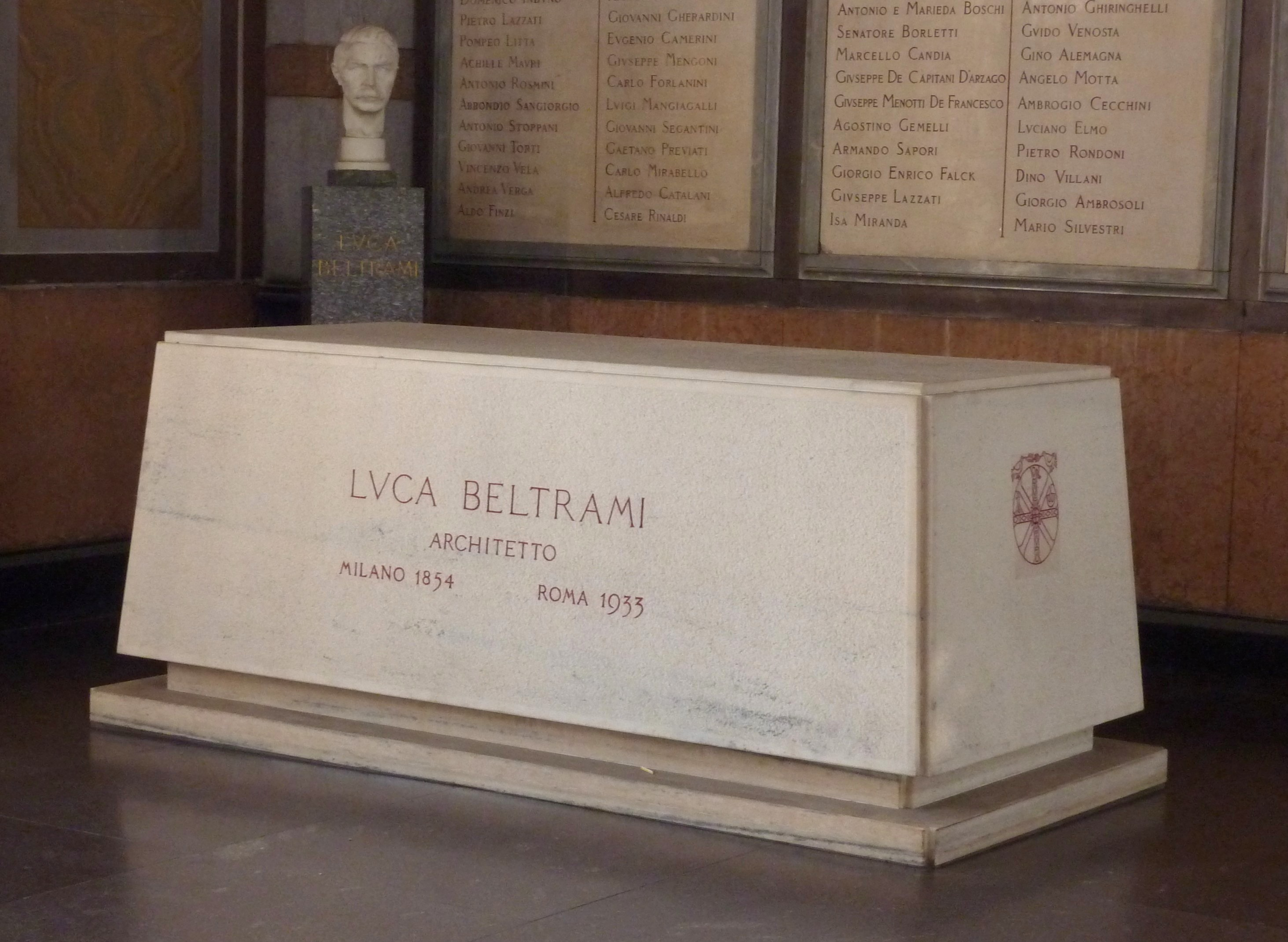
Beltrami's grave at the Cimitero Monumentale in Milan, in 2015

Beltrami died in Milan on 8 August 1933. He is buried at the Cimitero Monumentale di Milano. Beltrami wrote over 1100 works, recorded in the two-volume Bibliografia degli scritti di Luca Beltrami (Milan, 1930) and 'Supplemento alla Bibliografia di Luca Beltrami', L'ultimo scritto di Beltrami (Milan, 1934).

== Honours ==
- 1896 : member of the Royal Academy of Science, Letters and Fine Arts of Belgium.

== See also ==
- Palazzo delle Assicurazioni Generali (Milan)

== Bibliography ==
Media related to Luca Beltrami at Wikimedia Commons

- Mezzanotte, Paolo (1966). "BELTRAMI, Luca". Dizionario Biografico degli Italiani (in Italian). Vol. 8: Bellucci–Beregan. Rome: Istituto dell'Enciclopedia Italiana. ISBN 978-88-12-00032-6.
- Varagnoli, Claudio (2007–2008), "Conservazione e ripristino in Italia nel secondo Ottocento. Il rapporto storia-restauro in Luca Beltrami." (PDF), Corso di "Teoria e storia del restauro": Appunti dalle lezioni, Università degli Studi di Chieti e Pescara – Facoltà di Architettura, archived from the original (PDF) on 4 October 2011. (Class notes for a course on the theory and history of architectural restoration.)
