= Zerelda G. Wallace =

American activist

Zerelda Gray Sanders Wallace
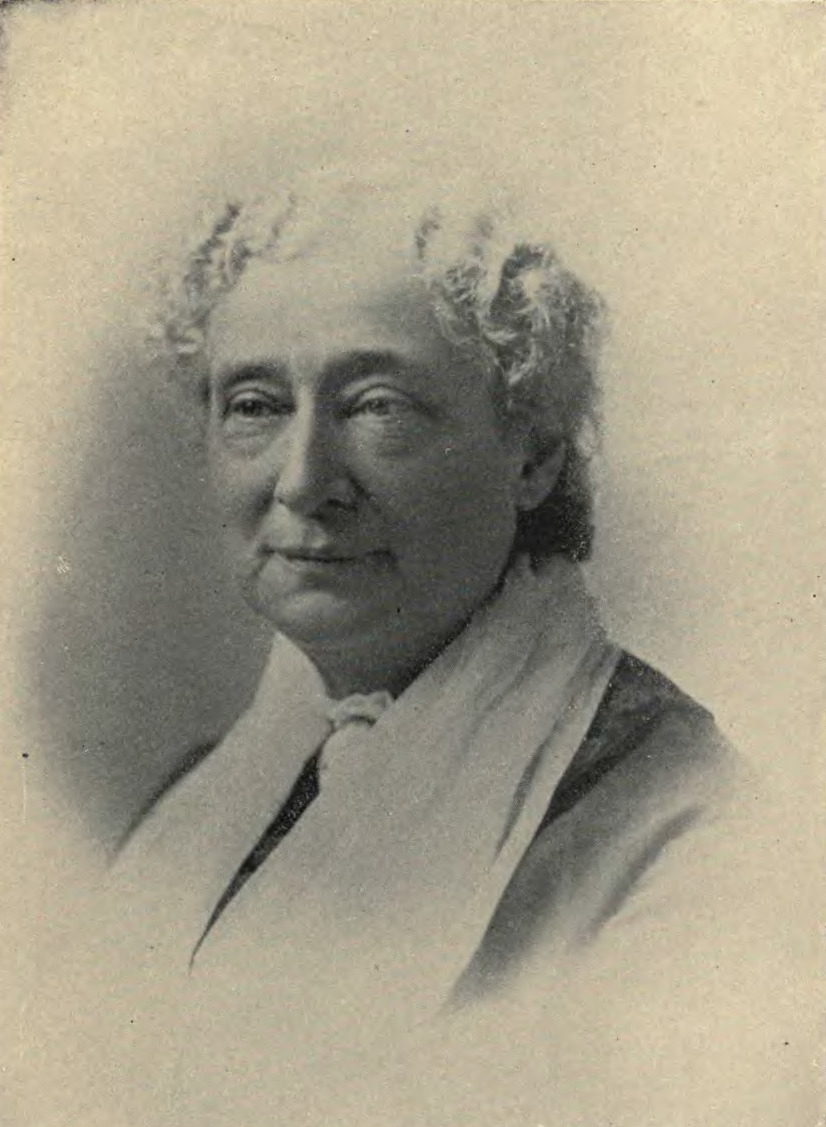
- "A Woman of the Century"
- Born: August 6, 1817; Bourbon County, Kentucky
- Died: March 19, 1901 (aged 83); Jennings Township, Owen County, Indiana
- Resting place: Crown Hill Cemetery and Arboretum, Section 3, Lot 10; 39.8176032°N 86.1730399°W
- Occupations: Suffragist temperance leader
- Spouse: David Wallace
- Children: Mary, Ellen, Jemima, Sanders, Agnes, and David
- Parent(s): John H. and Polly C. (Gray) Sanders
- Relatives: William, Lewis, Edward (stepsons)

Zerelda Gray Sanders Wallace (August 6, 1817 – March 19, 1901) was the First Lady of Indiana from 1837 to 1840, and a temperance activist, women's suffrage leader, and inspirational speaker in the 1870s and 1880s. She was a charter member of Central Christian Church, the first Christian Church (Disciples of Christ) in Indianapolis, Indiana. Her husband was David Wallace, the sixth governor of Indiana; Lew Wallace, one of her stepsons, became an American Civil War general and author.

== Early life and education ==
Zerelda Gray Sanders was born on August 7, 1817, in Millersburg, Kentucky. She was the eldest of five daughters born to John H., a physician, and Polly C. (Gray) Sanders. After receiving a grammar-school education, she attended a boarding school at Versailles, Kentucky, from 1828 to 1830. Around 1830 the Sanders family moved to Indianapolis, where her father continued his medical practice. Zerelda was an avid reader as a youth and had an interest in medicine.

== Marriage and family ==
On December 25, 1836, nineteen-year-old Zerelda married thirty-seven-year-old David Wallace. At the time he was the lieutenant governor of Indiana and a widower with three sons from his first marriage. Zerelda became a stepmother to Wallace's sons (William, Lew, and Edward). The couple also had six children of their own, but only three of them (Mary, Agnes, and David) survived to adulthood.

In 1837, a year after the Wallaces were married, David was elected the sixth governor of Indiana, He served from December 6, 1837, to December 9, 1840, and Zerelda, who was in her early twenties, became First Lady of Indiana. In 1841 David served a one-year term in the U.S. Congress, but failed to win re-election and returned to his Indianapolis law practice in 1842. He was judge of the court of common pleas for Marion County, Indiana, until his death in Indianapolis on September 4, 1859. After David's death, Zerelda was left nearly penniless with young children still at home, but she refused assistance from other family members. Fortunately, she retained the family's residence in Indianapolis and took in boarders to earn an income. In 1870 she took on the additional task of caring for the four children of her daughter, Mary, who had died in childbirth.

Lew Wallace, Zerelda's stepson, became an American Civil War general and author of the novel Ben-Hur: A Tale of the Christ. It is believed the character of Ben Hur's mother is modeled after Zerelda, who was a devoted mother to her children and stepsons. Zerelda was also a sister-in-law of Richard Jordan Gatling, inventor of the Gatling gun. Gatling married Zerelda's younger sister, Jemima Sanders.

Her daughter-in-law was an opera singer, Zelda Seguin Wallace, the wife of David Wallace Jr. Zelda Wallace performed at suffrage events hosted by Zerelda Wallace.

== Church activities ==
Zerelda, who was described as shy and without personal ambition, showed little interest in becoming active in public life before 1873. However, she was an active member of the first Christian Church (Disciples of Christ) in Indianapolis. She was a charter member of the congregation, and later served as a church deaconess. Organized in 1833, it was the "mother church" of the other Disciples of Christ congregations in Indianapolis, and was renamed Central Christian Church in 1879. In 1890 its congregation dedicated a new church at Fort Wayne Avenue and Walnut Street, where Wallace's funeral service was held in 1901.

By the 1880s Wallace was not hesitant to demonstrate her convictions on the issue of temperance. In 1883 she refused to take communion unless unfermented grape juice was substituted for wine. Central Christian Church became the first Disciples of Christ church in Indianapolis to switch to grape juice for its communion services; other Disciples of Christ congregations in the United States soon followed its lead.

== Temperance and suffrage leader ==
Wallace had a longstanding interest in social reform, but she became more vocal in her support and an activist in the temperance and women's suffrage movements after 1873. Although she never spoke publicly until the age of fifty-six, Wallace earned a reputation as capable and effective speaker. Better known as an inspirational speaker rather than an administrator among the social reformers of her era, Wallace was popular on the national lecture circuit for her speeches on temperance and suffrage. The speaking engagements she made throughout the United States also provided Wallace with an income.

Wallace's first efforts as a social reformer were tied to the temperance movement. On March 3, 1874, she was among the organizers of the Women's Christian Temperance Union of Indiana. Wallace was elected the Indiana chapter's first president, serving from 1874 to 1876, and also served as its president from 1879 to 1882. In November 1874 Wallace attended the national WCTU conference at Cleveland, Ohio, where she met suffragist Frances Willard. Wallace was described as a "calm" and "non-radical" activist. Her friend Willard later remarked, "A man of equal ability would have been entitled to lead a party or to organize a cabinet."

On January 21, 1875, she testified before the Indiana General Assembly, presenting 21,050 signatures on temperance petitions from forty-seven Indiana counties. Many of the legislators showed "open contempt" as Wallace spoke, and afterwards she credited the event for prompting her to become a suffragist. Later that year she attended the national WCTU conference in Cincinnati, Ohio, where the delegates approved her proposed resolution for a national vote of men and women on prohibition of the manufacture and sale of alcoholic beverages.

By the late 1870s, Wallace had become involved in the women's suffrage movement. In April 1878 twenty-six people who attended a meeting held at Wallace's home agreed to form the Equal Suffrage Society of Indianapolis. Wallace was elected as the group's president; May Wright Sewall, who initiated the group's first meeting a month earlier, was elected secretary. For nearly a decade the Indianapolis suffrage group did not formally join a specific suffrage organization at the national level. Instead, the Society preferred to work with several different groups that were politically active in lobbying, letter-writing campaigns, gathering petitions, and speechmaking on behalf of women's suffrage. The Society finally affiliated with the National Woman Suffrage Association in 1887.

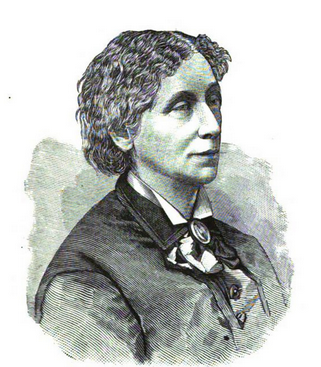
Zerelda Wallace

On January 23, 1880, Wallace was one of several who testified before the U.S. Senate Committee on the Judiciary on women's right to vote. As she explained in her address, "You must admit that in popular government the ballot is the most potent means of all moral and social reforms." In 1881 Wallace was among those who lobbied the Indiana General Assembly to approve a woman's suffrage amendment to the state's constitution. The state legislature voted in favor of the suffrage amendment and a prohibition provision in 1881; however, at that time Indiana law required passage in two consecutive sessions of the general assembly followed by approval from the state's voters before the legislation could become state law. At the next legislative session in 1883, the Indiana House of Representatives approved the woman suffrage resolution by a 53 to 42 vote, but the Indiana Senate refused to act on it. The Indiana legislature took no further action on woman suffrage until 1920, when it ratified the Nineteenth Amendment to the U.S. Constitution.

In the early 1880s, after the failure to achieve women's suffrage in Indiana, Wallace felt that a national constitutional amendment would be the fastest and most efficient way to achieve voting rights for women. In 1883 she sent a letter to suffragist Susan B. Anthony expressing her sentiments, and Anthony read Wallace's inspirational letter to delegates attending the fifteenth annual convention of the National Woman Suffrage Association. This group, which was headed by Elizabeth Cady Stanton and Anthony, was one of the two major suffrage groups in the United States at that time. The other was the American Woman Suffrage Association, led by Lucy Stone and Julia Ward Howe. In 1890 the two groups joined forces to form the National American Woman Suffrage Association.

Between 1883 and 1888, Wallace was active in the women's suffrage movement at the national level as head of the franchise (suffrage) department of the national WCTU. In 1887 she was a founder of the Indiana chapter of the National Woman Suffrage Association and delivered an address at the NWSA's national convention. She also served three years as its vice president at large. In 1888 Wallace spoke at the International Conference of Women in Washington, D.C. By that time she was a well-known and popular speaker on social reform issues, especially temperance and woman suffrage.

== Later years ==
In the late 1880s, after Wallace collapsed on a speakers podium, she became less active in the women's suffrage and temperance movements. She spent her final years at the home of her daughter, Agnes, in Cataract, Owen County, Indiana.

== Death and legacy ==
Wallace died March 19, 1901, at Cataract, Indiana, at the age of eighty-three. After her funeral service at Central Christian Church, she was buried at Crown Hill Cemetery in Indianapolis. Lew Wallace memorialized his stepmother as "Mother Wallace, the sweet-tongued apostle of temperance and reform."

In 1930 the League of Women Voters selected Wallace to represent Indiana and installed a bronze plaque in recognition of her efforts on behalf of women's suffrage at its headquarters in Washington, D.C.

In 2004 an Indiana State Historical Marker was dedicated in Wallace's honor on the grounds of the Central Christian Church. The marker is installed along Fort Wayne Avenue, in the block between Alabama and Delaware Streets, in downtown Indianapolis. Kathy Davis, Indiana's first female lieutenant governor, led the June 13, 2004, dedication ceremony.
