= Arthur Seguin =

English singer

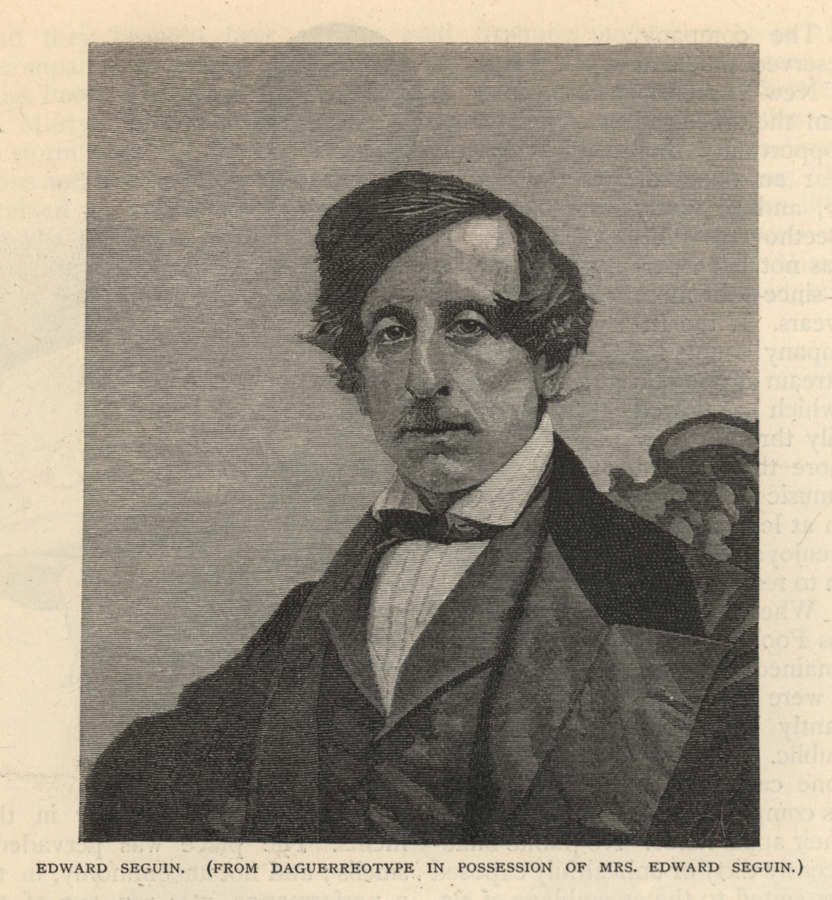
Authur Edward Seguin

Arthur Seguin (full name Arthur Edward Sheldon Seguin; 7 April 1809 – 13 December 1852) was an English operatic bass singer. He appeared in opera houses in London in the 1830s; from 1838 he lived in America, appearing in New York and touring the USA and Canada.

== Early life and career ==
Seguin was born in London on 7 April 1809. His father, Ralph Arthur Seguin (1781/2–1865), was for many years secretary at Her Majesty's Theatre; his mother was Sarah née Smythe. He was of Irish descent. He was educated at the Royal Academy of Music, from which he narrowly escaped dismissal for some youthful breaches of discipline in 1827. In that year he came into prominence by his singing at a students' public concert in the Hanover Square Rooms. His performance of the part of Basilio in Rossini's The Barber of Seville, at the first dramatic performance of the Royal Academy of Music on 8 December 1828, was warmly praised by the press. On 6 November 1830 he was in the academy's production of Lord Burghersh's opera Catherine, Ann Childe (who subsequently became his wife) filling the title-role. A reviewer wrote: "... in the concerted pieces... his fine sonorous bass came in with a charming effect."

Early in 1831 he sang Polyphemus in a stage representation of Handel's Acis and Galatea at the Queen's Theatre, Tottenham Street, under the management of George Macfarren. In 1832 Seguin was engaged at Drury Lane, where he appeared with Maria Malibran in Bellini's La Sonnambula, and during the two following years, and from 1835 to 1837, he sang at Covent Garden. His performance of Masetto in the revival of Mozart's Don Giovanni in February 1833 was successful, and in 1835 he was in Beethoven's Fidelio, as Rocco.

In May 1836, appearing with Maria Malibran, he created the role of Synnelet in Balfe's The Maid of Artois at Drury Lane, and in August 1838 he created the part of the baron in George Alexander Macfarren's The Devil's Opera at the English Opera House.

== America ==
In that year he left England for America, where he first appeared as the Count in Rooke's Amilie, or the Love Test on 15 October at the National Theatre, New York. In America he founded an operatic company, The Seguin Troupe, which toured successfully in the United States and Canada, including in the summer of 1840 a season of opera at the Theatre Royal in Montreal, Canada.

A concert given by Anna Bishop at the Tripler Hall, New York in 1850 was reviewed: "Mr Seguin sang the two great bass songs from the Creation, in pure and classical style. He has a grand voice, a true basso profondo, rich, deep, flowing.... We have but one fault to find in him — he lacks somewhat in fire...."

Seguin is said to have been elected a chief by an Indian tribe, an honour he shared with Edmund Kean. He died in New York in 1852. His was described as "one of the finest bass voices ever heard" (The Athenæum, 1853, page 115), and he was also noted as a comic actor.

== Notes and references ==
Attribution

- This article incorporates text from a publication now in the public domain: Legge, Robin Humphrey (1897). "Seguin, Arthur Edward Shelden". In Lee, Sidney (ed.). Dictionary of National Biography. Vol. 51. London: Smith, Elder & Co. pp. 208–209.
