= Zelda Seguin Wallace =

American opera singer and suffragist

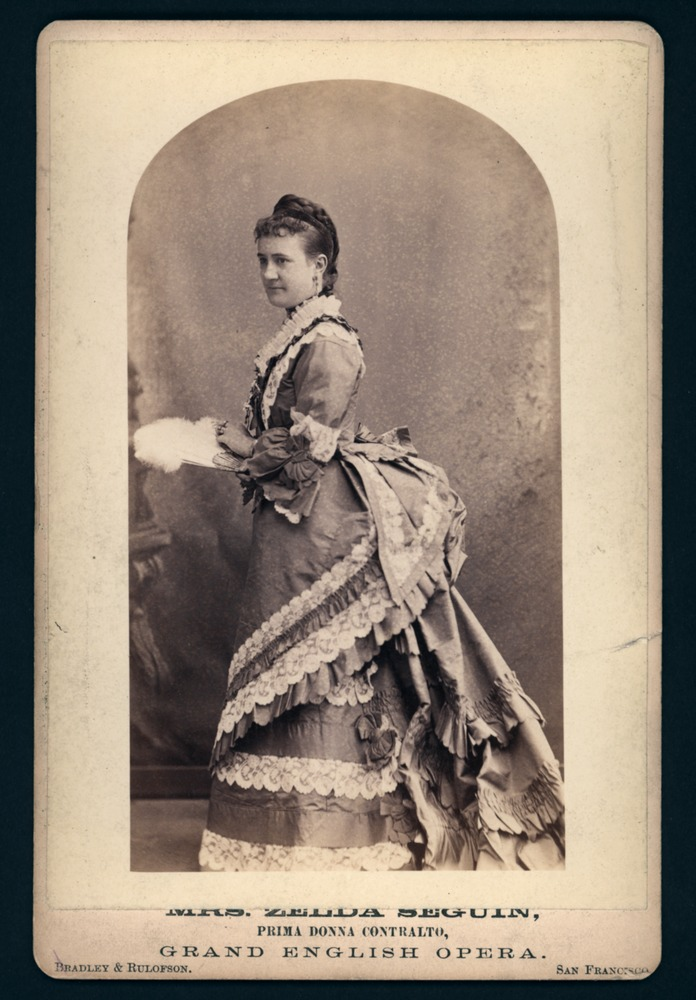
Zelda Seguin Wallace, in an 1876 publicity photograph

Zelda Harrison Seguin Wallace (1848 – February 19, 1914) was an American opera singer and suffragist.

== Early life ==
Zelda Harrison was born in New York City. She studied voice with Ann Childe Seguin, who sang at the coronation of Queen Victoria.

== Career ==
Zelda Harrison, a contralto, first appeared on stage in 1865, at age 17, in Saratoga Springs, New York. As Zelda Seguin she found success singing popular French and Italian operas in English translations, including with Emma Abbott in her Abbott English Opera Company. She was well known for being the first to sing the title role of Carmen in English in the United States, and as Azucena in Il trovatore, among other parts.

Seguin Wallace's last opera performance was in New York City in 1886, in The Mikado. She continued giving concerts, especially near her home in Indianapolis, Indiana, and for causes she supported, including women's suffrage. "It is not generally known, and when asserted usually excites astonishment, that Zelda Seguin-Wallace is a very strong woman suffragist", noted a commentator in 1883.

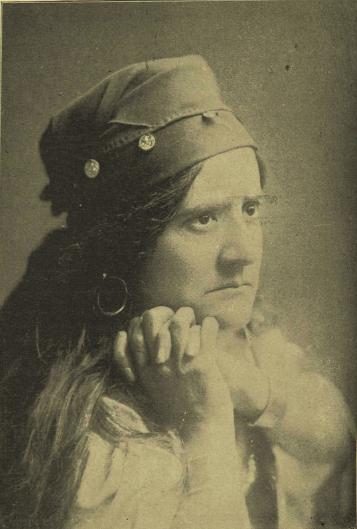
Wallace in 1898

Wallace was seriously injured in a fatal train derailment in 1895, effectively ending her performing days. A house fire at a relative's property in 1911 destroyed many of her costumes, scores, and memorabilia.

== Personal life ==
Harrison married twice. Her first husband was singer Edward S. C. "Ned" Seguin, son of her voice teacher Ann Seguin; they married in 1867 and he died in 1879. She had a son, Edward S. R. Seguin, from her first marriage. She married railroad man David Wallace Jr., in 1880, giving up a substantial inheritance from her first mother-in-law's estate. She was widowed again when David Wallace Jr. died in 1911. She died in 1914, aged 65 years.

After her second marriage, Seguin Wallace's brother-in-law was Lew Wallace, author of Ben-Hur. Her mother-in-law Zerelda G. Wallace was a temperance and suffrage activist, wife of Indiana governor David Wallace.
