= Thomas Welsh (composer) =

English composer and operatic bass

Thomas Welsh (c. 1780 - 24 or 31 January 1848) was an English composer and operatic bass. Welsh spent most of his life in London and is now particularly remembered for his light-hearted stage works.

== Life ==
The son of John Welsh, by his wife, a daughter of Thomas Linley the elder, he was born at Wells, Somerset. He became a chorister in Wells Cathedral, where his singing notice; Richard Brinsley Sheridan heard of him, and induced Linley to engage him for oratorio performances at the Haymarket Theatre, London, in 1796. Engagements followed for the stage, in course of which he sang in many operas, some of which, such as Thomas Attwood's Prisoner, were written specially to exhibit his powers. He was also brought into notice as an actor, mainly through the influence of Kemble.

Meanwhile he was completing a musical education under Karl Friedrich Horn, Johann Baptist Cramer, and Baumgarten. He produced two farces at the Lyceum Theatre, and an opera, Kamskatka, at Covent Garden, and ultimately settled down to his main work, as a teacher of singing. He had great success with his pupils, among whom were Charles Edward Horn, Catherine Stephens, Jane Shirreff, and Mary Anne Wilson, who became his wife, and sang in many important concerts.

He died at Brighton on 24 January 1848. In addition to dramatic pieces, he wrote some sonatas for piano (1819), songs, part-songs, glees and duets, and a ‘Vocal Instructor,’ London [1825].

== Stage works ==
- Twenty Years Ago! ('musical play', 21 July 1810, London, Lyceum Theatre)
- The Green-eyed Monster (or How to Get Your Money) ('operatic farce', 14 October 1811, London, Lyceum Theatre)
- Kamtchatka (or The Slave's Tribute) ('musical play', 16 October 1811, London, Covent Garden)
- Up to Town ('comic opera', 6 November 1811, London, Covent Garden) (collaborative composition with William Reeve, Condell, Whitaker)
- For England, Ho! ('melodramatic opera', 15 December 1813, London, Covent Garden) (collaborative composition with Henry Bishop)
- Is He Jealous? ('operetta', 2 July 1816, London, Lyceum Theatre)
