= Cadenabbia =

Frazione of Italy

Coordinates: 45°59′26″N 9°14′11″E

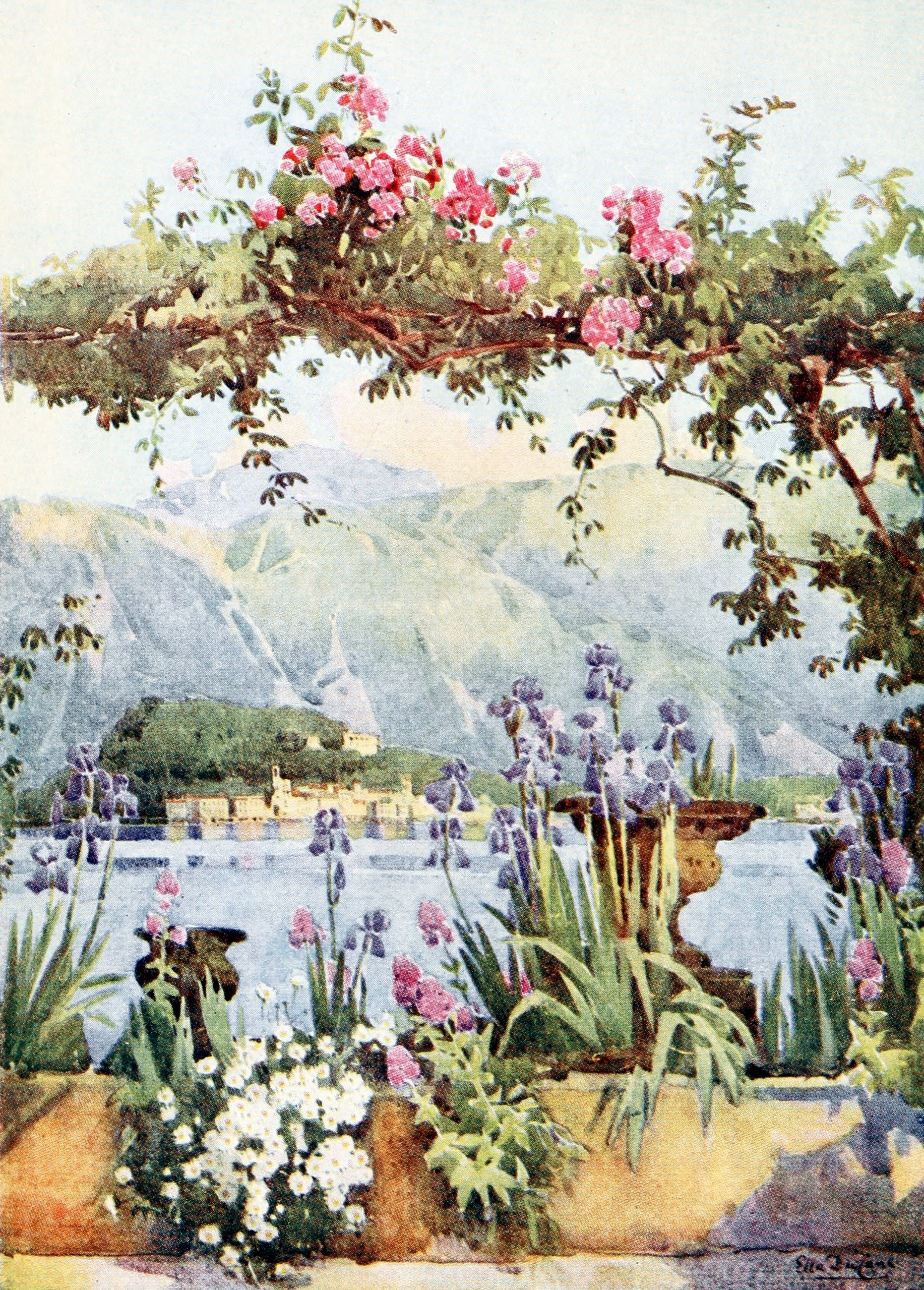
Cadenabbia as drawn by John Finnemore in 1907.

A chiesa in Cadenabbia along the hiking path to Chiesa di San Martino

Cadenabbia (Cadenabbia di Griante) is a small community in Lombardy, Italy, in the province of Como, on the west shore of Lake Como. The community is part of the comune of Griante, between the communities of Menaggio and Tremezzo.

Cadenabbia is a favorite spring and autumn resort, owing to the great beauty of the scenery and of the vegetation, and its sheltered situation. It also serves as a health resort and a holiday place for travellers. A favoured travel destination of the British since the 19th century, it is the site of one of the first Anglican churches built in Italy, the Church of the Ascension (1891).

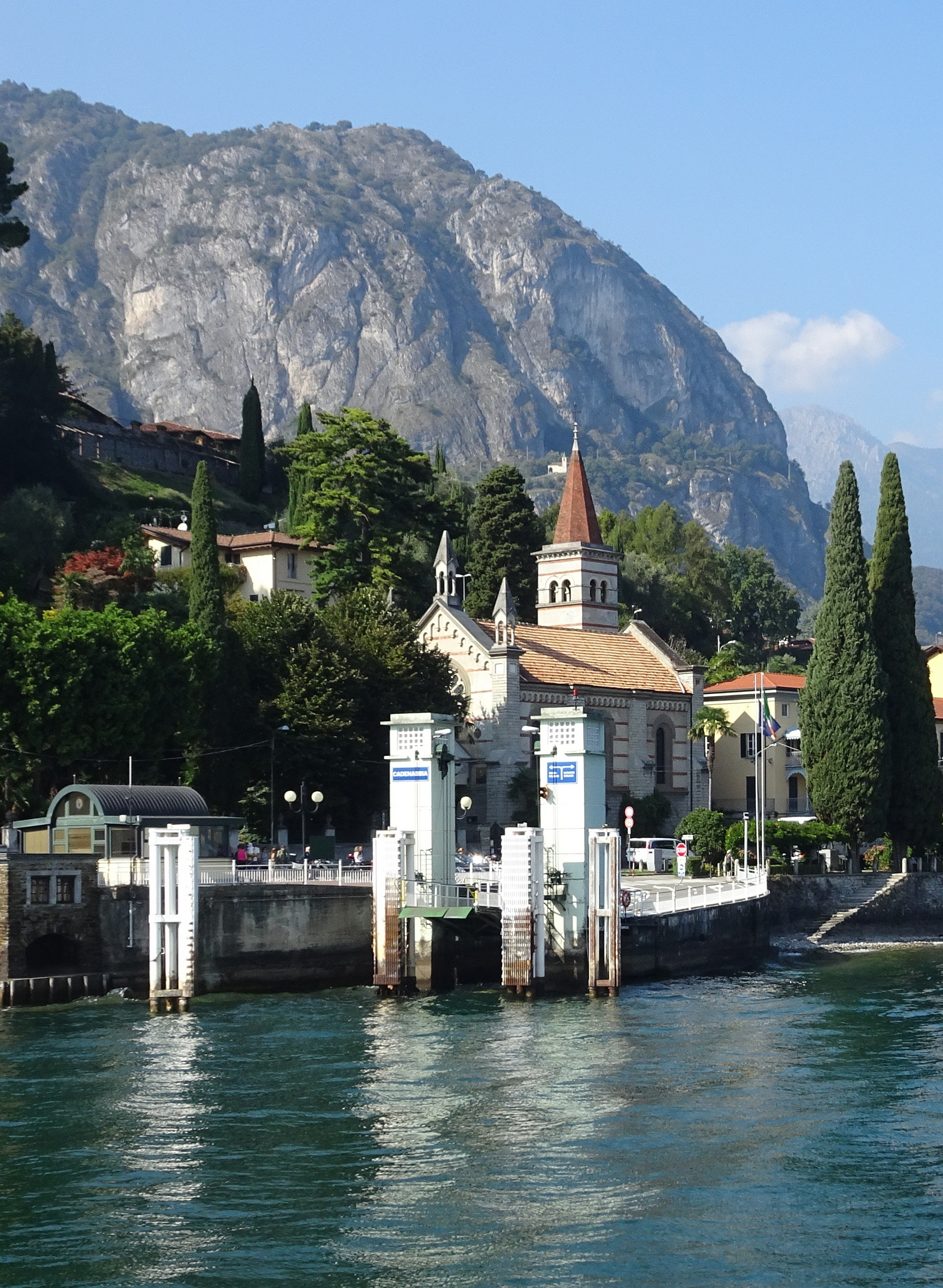
Church of the Ascension, Griante
