= National Gazette and Literary Register =

The National Gazette and Literary Register was a daily newspaper published in Philadelphia by William Fry from 1820 to 1841.

The first issue of National Gazette and Literary Register was printed on July 5, 1820, the publisher being William Fry, No. 63 South Fifth Street. It was published on Wednesdays and Fridays, at US$5 per annum. After a time, the semi-weekly issues ceased, and the National Gazette was brought out as a daily evening paper. Robert Walsh was associated with Fry in the establishment of this paper. This journal, under the management of Walsh, made an inroad upon the method in which daily newspapers had previously been conducted. Walsh was not much of a party politician. His tastes were literary. He had commenced his career as a writer in the Portfolio, had been one of the contributors to the American Review, and had published various books, essays, and papers. The National Gazette, while not wholly neglecting the politics of the country, discussed matters of science, literature, fine arts, and philosophy. On January 1, 1842, the National Gazette was merged into the Pennsylvania Inquirer.
