= Amilie, or the Love Test =

- Opera by William Michael Rooke
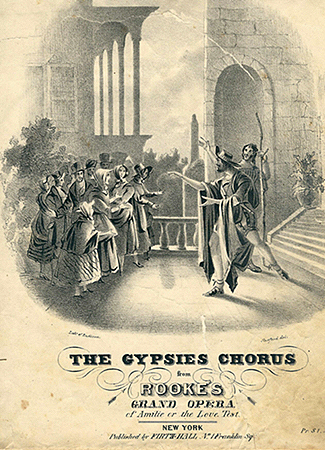
- Gypsies chorus from Amilie: sheet music cover, New York, 1839
- Librettist: John Thomas Haines
- Language: English
- Premiere: 2 December 1837; Covent Garden Theatre, London
- Website: archive.org/details/amilieorlovetest00rook

Amilie, or the Love Test is an opera in three acts by the Irish composer, William Michael Rooke, to a libretto by John Thomas Haines.

== Background ==
Although written around 1818 in Dublin, the opera was not performed until almost twenty years later, at Covent Garden Theatre, London, on 2 December 1837. The music critic George Hogarth considered that the work displayed "genius, learning, taste, and a rich vein of melody, flowing, graceful and expressive", whilst the orchestral writing was "skillful and beautiful". The role of Amilie was played by the soprano Jane Shirreff (1811–1883). The Musical Review was not so complimentary, quoting the London correspondent of the New York Mirror: although conceding that "the music [...] is of a superior description", he added that "the plot is almost unintelligible" and that "vocal talent is at a miserably low ebb."

The production's success however led to further performances elsewhere. Michael William Balfe (who had studied with Rooke as a boy) sang the baritone role in a performance at the Theatre Royal, Dublin in 1838, and the opera was performed in New York at the National Theatre on 15 October in the same year, with Jane Shirreff repeating the title role in her American debut and with the Scottish tenor John Wilson as Jose. Her success there led to a 20-month tour of the US (with Wilson as her manager). The second act was given as part of a musical entertainment at the same theatre in 1839. The music historian Karen Alquist couples the American debut of Amilie with the contemporary performance there of Bellini's La Sonnambula, and suggests that "they taught New Yorkers a new musical style, enabling them to enjoy a broad new repertoire in which elaborate musical structures were no longer reduced to simple ballad forms but could be understood in their own terms".

The work's success gave rise to further performances in America, including a burlesque version by the actor-manager William Mitchell at the Olympic Theatre, New York, in 1839, entitled Amy Lee, or Who Loves Best?

The existence of manuscript orchestral parts, copied in New York, with the stamp of a Melbourne agent, in the National Library of Australia suggests there must also have been antipodean performances. Indeed, The Melbourne Argus of Tuesday 20 January 1863 refers to the Australian Premiere at the Theatre Royal "last night."

Rooke's subsequent operas did not meet the success of Amilie: Henrique, or the Love Pilgrim was pulled after a few performances in London in 1839, (perhaps due to disagreements with the manager of Covent Garden, William Macready), and his subsequent works Cagliostro and The Valkyrie were never staged.

== Roles ==
Role	Voice type	Premiere American Cast, 15 October 1838 (Conductor: Mr. Penson)
Paul Pesta		A. Andrews
Jean Piednoir		Mr. Blakely
Babet		Mrs. Cantor
Hans Meyer		Mr. Duggan
Brenner		Mr.Horncastle
Lelia		Mrs. W. Penson
Gervaise Grenadot		Mr. W.H. Williams
Amilie	soprano	Jane Shireff
Jose Spechbacher	Tenor	John Wilson
Chorus of gypsies apparently (see picture)

== References and sources ==
Notes

Sources

- Oxford Music Online, Rooke, William Michael, Shirreff (Shireff), Jane, and Wilson, John.
- Flood, William H.Grattan, A History of Irish Music, Chapter 28.
- Horowitz, Joseph, Sermons in Tones: Sacralization as a Theme in American Classical Music in 'American Music' vol.16 no,3 (1998)
- Rogers, Delmer D., Public Music Performances in New York City from 1800 to 1850, in 'Anuario Interamericano de Investigacion Musical', Vol. 6, (1970)
- Salaman, Charles K., English Opera in 'The Musical Times', vol 18 no. 412, 1 June 1877.
- Tyldesley, William, Michael William Balfe
