= Countess of Essex =

Countess of Essex may refer to:

1st creation

- Rohese de Vere, Countess of Essex, 12th century (wife of the 1st Earl)
- Hawise, Countess of Aumale (died 1214) (wife of the 3rd Earl)

2nd creation

- Aveline de Clare, Countess of Essex (1178-1225) (wife of 1st Earl)

3rd creation

- Elizabeth of Rhuddlan (1282–1316) (wife of the 3rd Earl)
- Joan Fitzalan, Countess of Hereford (1347–1419) (wife of the 6th Earl)

4th creation

- Eleanor de Bohun (c. 1366–1399) (wife of the 1st Earl)

5th creation

- Isabel of Cambridge, Countess of Essex (1409–1484) (wife of the 1st Earl)

7th creation

- Elisabeth Parr, Marchioness of Northampton (née Brooke; 1526–1565) (wife of the 1st Earl)

8th creation

- Lettice Knollys (1543–1634) (wife of the 1st Earl)
- Frances Walsingham (1567–1631) (wife of the 2nd Earl)
- Frances Carr, Countess of Somerset (née Howard; 1590–1632) (wife of the 3rd Earl)

9th creation

- Elizabeth Capell, Countess of Essex (née Percy; 1636–1718) (wife of the 1st Earl)
- Mary Capel, Countess of Essex (née Bentinck; 1679–1726) (wife of the 2nd Earl)
- Jane Capell, Countess of Essex (née Hyde; 1694–1724) (1st wife of the 3rd Earl)
- Elizabeth Capell, Countess of Essex (1704–1784) (née Russell) (2nd wife of the 3rd Earl)
- Sarah, Countess of Essex (née Bazett; 1759–1838) (1st wife of the 5th Earl)
- Catherine Stephens, Countess of Essex (1794–1882), English vocalist and actress (2nd wife of the 5th Earl)
- Adele Capell, Countess of Essex (d. 28 July 1922), US-born beauty and socialite. (wife of George Devereux de Vere Capell, 7th Earl of Essex)
