= Rhys Lewis =

Rhys Lewis may refer to:

- Rhys Lewis (novel)
- Rhys Lewis (born 1532), MP for New Radnor Boroughs October 1553 and 1558
- Rhys Lewis (1571 MP), MP for New Radnor Boroughs 1571
- Rhys Lewis (musician), British musician born in 1993
