= Richard Blike =

16th-century Welsh politician

Richard Blike, Bleak or Bleck (by 1517 – 1557), of New Radnor, was a Welsh politician.

== Family ==
Blike married Catharine Dunn, daughter of Lewis Dunn of Badland. They had one daughter, and Catharine died at some point before 1544. He then married Eleanor Vaughan, the daughter of James Vaughan of Hergest, Herefordshire. They had one son and three daughters.

== Career ==
He was appointed the first escheator of Radnorshire in 1541, appointed again in 1546 and made High Sheriff of Radnorshire for 1453–54. He was a Member (MP) of the Parliament of England for New Radnor Boroughs in 1555 and Radnorshire in 1547.

Parliament of England
Preceded by Robert Vaughan	Member of Parliament for New Radnor Boroughs; 1555	Succeeded by Rhys Lewis
Preceded by John Knill	Member of Parliament for Radnorshire; 1547	Succeeded by ?
