= Green-Price baronets =

Baronetcy in the Baronetage of the United Kingdom

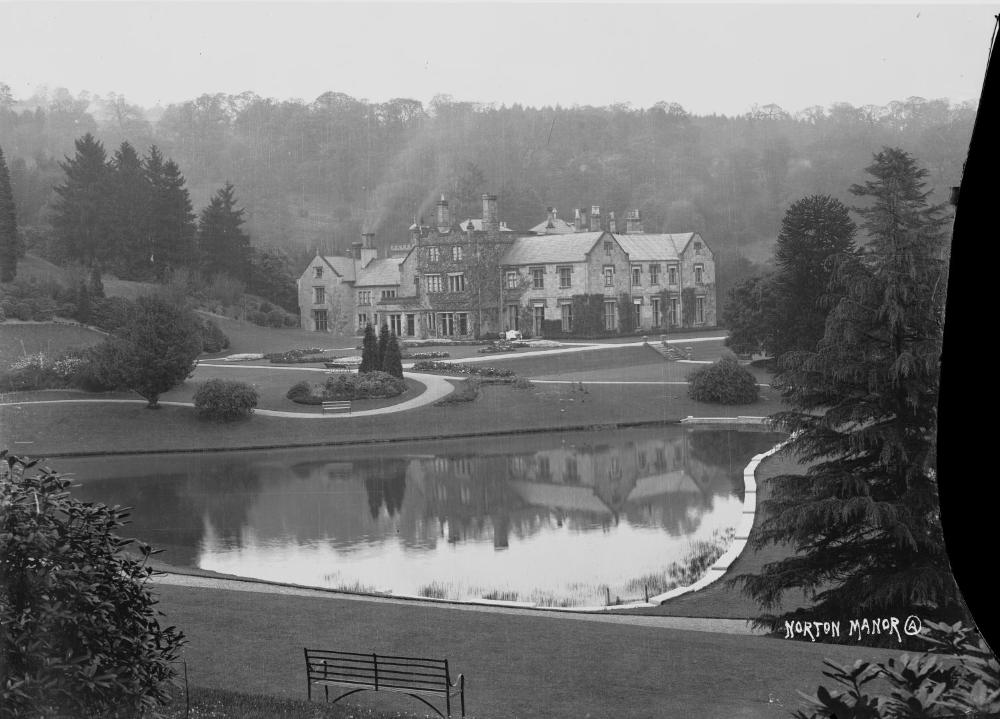
Norton Manor

The Green-Price Baronetcy, of Norton Manor in the parish of Norton in the County of Radnor, is a title in the Baronetage of the United Kingdom. It was created on 23 March 1874 for Richard Green-Price, Liberal Member of Parliament for Radnor and Radnorshire. Born Richard Green, he had assumed the additional surname of Price as heir to his maternal uncle Richard Price of Norton Manor, Radnorshire. The third Baronet was High Sheriff of Radnorshire.

== Green-Price baronets, of Norton Manor (1874) ==
- Sir Richard Green-Price, 1st Baronet (1803–1887)
- Sir Richard Dansey Green-Price, 2nd Baronet (1838–1909), son of 1st Baronet; JP for Radnorshire and Herefordshire; married Clara Anne, daughter of Rev. Thomas Powell, JP, rector of Dorstone, Herefordshire
- Sir Robert Henry Green-Price, 3rd Baronet (1872–1962), son of 2nd Baronet; DAQMG Egypt in 1917, Major, Montgomeryshire Yeomanry, formerly of the Shropshire Imperial Yeomanry; High Sheriff of Radnorshire in 1930, JP, DL; married Clara Lucile, daughter of Frederick Gaul Potter, of New York, U.S.A., but died without issue
- Sir John Green-Price, 4th Baronet (1908–1964), nephew of 3rd Baronet; Captain in the Royal Artillery; married Irene Marian, daughter of the politician Sir Guy Lloyd, 1st Baronet
- Sir Robert John Green-Price, 5th Baronet (1940–2025), son of 4th Baronet; Captain, Royal Corps of Transport, assistant professor of English, Chiba University of Commerce, Ichikawa, Chiba, Japan from 1982 to 1997, and a lecturer at Keio University, Teikyo University, and Waseda University from the 1970s onward
- Sir Simon Richard Green-Price, 6th Baronet (born 1964)

The heir presumptive is John Chase Green-Price (born 1947)
