= Edward Lewis (Radnor MP) =

Edward Lewis (died after 1790) was a British politician who sat in the House of Commons between 1761 and 1790.

Lewis was the Member of Parliament (MP) for Radnor, 1761–1768, 1769–1774 and 1775–1790.

Parliament of Great Britain
| Preceded by Thomas Lewis | Member of Parliament for Radnor; 1761 – 1768 | Succeeded by John Lewis |
| Preceded by John Lewis | Member of Parliament for Radnor; 1769 – 1774 | Succeeded by John Lewis |
| Preceded by John Lewis | Member of Parliament for Radnor; 1775 – 1790 | Succeeded by David Murray |
