= 1880 Radnor Boroughs by-election =

UK parliamentary by-election in Wales

The 1880 Radnor Boroughs by-election was a parliamentary by-election held for the UK House of Commons constituency of Radnor Boroughs in Wales on 17 May 1880.

== Vacancy ==
The by-election was caused by the resignation of the sitting Liberal MP, Spencer Cavendish who was also elected MP for North East Lancashire and opted to sit there, causing a by-election.

== Candidates ==
Two candidates were nominated.

The Liberal Party nominated former Acting Governor of Grenada Samuel Williams.

The Conservative Party nominated a soldier, Cecil Alfred Tufton Otway.

== Result ==
1880 Radnor Boroughs by-election
Party	Candidate	Votes	%	±%
Liberal	Samuel Williams	458	54.0	N/A
Conservative	Cecil Alfred Tufton Otway	390	46.0	N/A
Majority		68	8.0	N/A
Turnout		848	89.7	N/A
Registered electors		945		
Liberal hold				
