= Francis Douglas, 8th Earl of Wemyss =

Scottish earl

Francis Wemyss Charteris Douglas, 8th Earl of Wemyss, 4th Earl of March FRSE (15 April 1772 – 28 June 1853), known as the Earl of March from 1810 to 1826 and as the Earl of Wemyss and March from 1826 to 1853, was a Scottish peer.

== Background ==
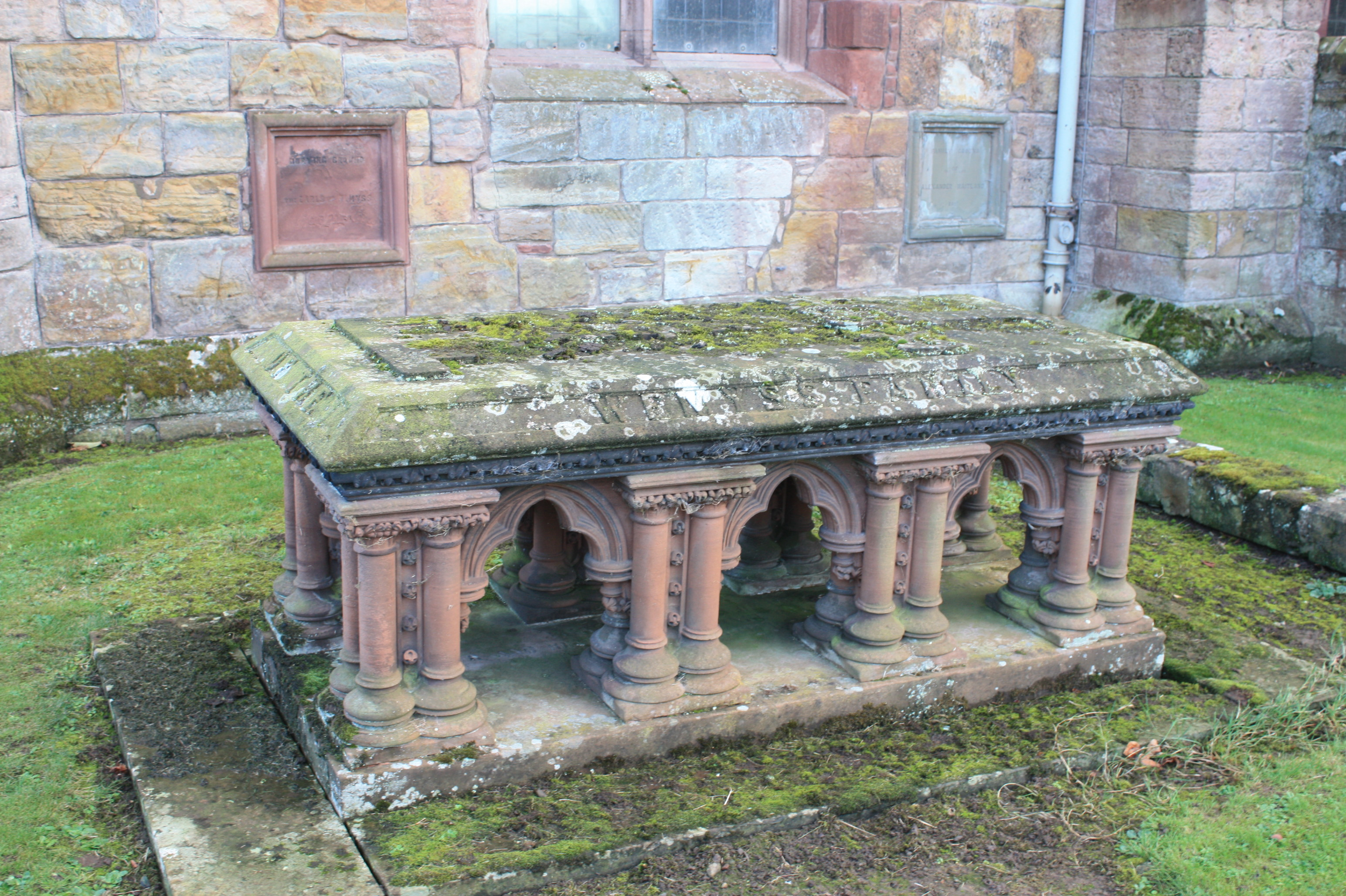
The grave of the Earls of Wemyss, St Marys Collegiate Church, Haddington

Wemyss was the son of Francis Wemyss Charteris, Lord Elcho (1749–1808), and the grandson of Francis Charteris, de jure 7th Earl of Wemyss.

He was educated at Eton College 1780 to 1787.

In 1810 he succeeded his second cousin twice removed William Douglas, 4th Duke of Queensberry and 3rd Earl of March to the Earldom of March, as the lineal heir male of the aforementioned Lady Anne Douglas, sister of the first Earl of March. He then assumed the surname of Douglas.

== Public life ==
In 1821 he was created Baron Wemyss, of Wemyss in the County of Fife, in the Peerage of the United Kingdom, which entitled him to an automatic seat in the House of Lords. In 1826 he obtained a reversal of the attainder of the earldom of Wemyss and became the eighth Earl of Wemyss as well. From 1821 to 1853 he served as Lord-Lieutenant of Peeblesshire.

In 1830 he had the roof of Elcho Castle repaired.

== Family ==
On 31 May 1794, he married Margaret, dau. of Walter Cambell of Shawfield & Islay and they had eight children:

- Lady Louisa Antoinetta Charteris (died 1854)
- Lady Harriet Charteris (died 1858)
- Francis Wemyss-Charteris, 9th Earl of Wemyss (1795–1883)
- Lady Eleanor Charteris (1796–1832), married her cousin Walter Frederick Campbell of Shawfield
- Walter Charteris (1797–1818)
- Lady Margaret Charteris (1800–1825)
- Lady Katherine Charteris Wemyss (1801–1844), married her first cousin George Grey, 8th Baron Grey of Groby.
- Lady Charlotte Charteris (1806–1886), married in 1825 Andrew Fletcher, of Saltoun Hall (d.1879), and left children.

Honorary titles
Preceded by The Lord Elibank	Lord-Lieutenant of Peeblesshire; 1821–1853	Succeeded by The Earl of Wemyss and March
Peerage of Scotland
Preceded by Francis Charteris	Earl of Wemyss; 1826–1853	Succeeded by Francis Wemyss-Charteris
Preceded by William Douglas	Earl of March; 1810–1853	Succeeded by Francis Wemyss-Charteris
Peerage of the United Kingdom
New creation	Baron Wemyss; 1821–1853; Member of the House of Lords (1821–1853)	Succeeded by Francis Wemyss-Charteris
