= Richard Price (Radnor MP) =

Welsh politician

Richard Price (1773 – 10 April 1861) was a Tory politician from Wales. He was the member of parliament (MP) for Radnor from 1799 to 1847.

Price was the eldest son Richard Price, a lawyer of Norton Manor, Knighton whose brother was Chase Price, the MP for Radnorshire. He was educated at University College, Oxford.

The Radnor seat was under the patronage of the 5th Earl of Oxford, whose uncle secured the seat for Price when a vacancy arose in 1799. Price developed his own support base, and within ten years was opposing Oxford's interests in Radnor.

He was a largely silent MP, supporting Tory administrations, and by 1832 had spoken in the House of Commons only to oppose parliamentary reform.

He died 10 April 1861, aged 88.

Parliament of Great Britain
Preceded by Viscount Malden	Member of Parliament for Radnor; 1799–1800	Succeeded by Parliament of the United Kingdom
Parliament of the United Kingdom
Preceded by Parliament of Great Britain	Member of Parliament for Radnor; 1801–1847	Succeeded by Sir Thomas Frankland Lewis
