= Francis Wemyss-Charteris, 9th Earl of Wemyss =

Scottish peer

The Right Honourable The Earl of Wemyss and March

Lord-Lieutenant of Peeblesshire
- In office 1853–1880
- Preceded by: The Earl of Wemyss and March
- Succeeded by: Colin James Mackenzie

Personal details
- Born: Francis Wemyss-Charteris; 14 August 1795
- Died: 1 January 1883 (aged 87)
- Spouse: Lady Louisa Bingham (m. 1817; died 1882)
- Children: 6
- Parent(s): Francis Douglas, 8th Earl of Wemyss; Margaret Campbel
- Education: Christ Church, Oxford

Francis Wemyss-Charteris, 9th Earl of Wemyss, 5th Earl of March (14 August 1795 – 1 January 1883), was a Scottish peer.

== Early life ==
Wemyss-Charteris was born 14 August 1795, the son of Francis Douglas, 8th Earl of Wemyss and the former Margaret Campbell.

He was educated at Christ Church, Oxford.

== Career ==
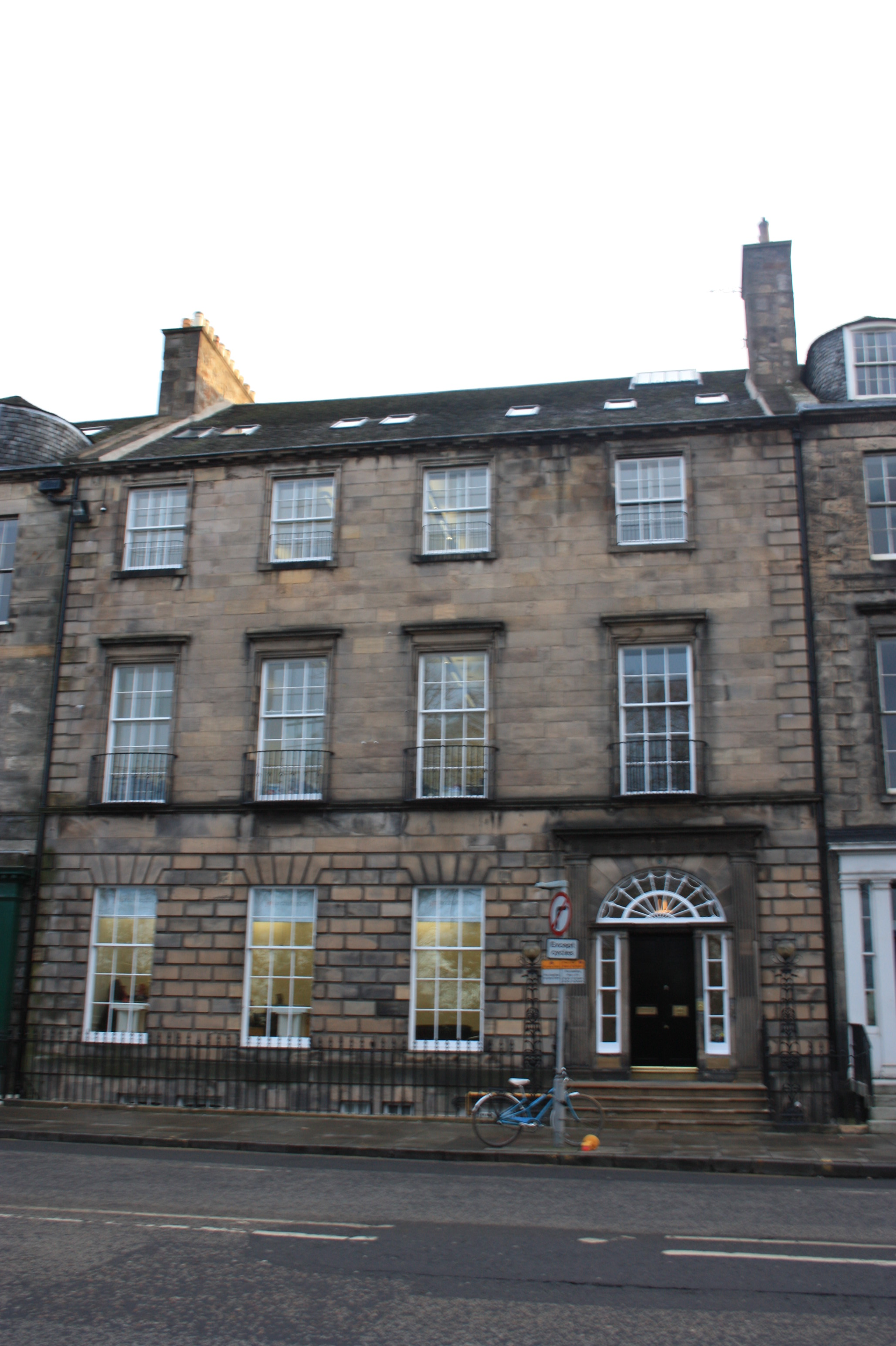
64 Queen Street in Edinburgh

From 1827 to 1830, he served as Grand Master of the Grand Lodge of Scotland. He was admitted to Royal Company of Archers, gaining the rank of Lieutenant-General in 1842.

Upon his father's death in 1853, he succeeded to the Earldoms of Wemyss and March. He served as Lord-Lieutenant of Peeblesshire from 1853 to 1880.

== Personal life ==
On 22 August 1817, he was married to Lady Louisa Bingham (1798–1882) in Paris, France. Lady Louisa was a daughter of Richard Bingham, 2nd Earl of Lucan and Lady Elizabeth Belasyse (third daughter of Henry Belasyse, 2nd Earl Fauconberg and former wife of Bernard Howard, 12th Duke of Norfolk). They had six children:

- Francis Richard Charteris, 10th Earl of Wemyss (1818–1914), who married Lady Anne Anson, second daughter of Thomas Anson, 1st Earl of Lichfield.
- Lt.-Col. Richard Charteris (1822–1874), who married Lady Margaret Butler, a daughter of Richard Butler, 2nd Earl of Glengall. They lived at Cahir Lodge.
- Margaret Charteris-Wemyss-Douglas (1824–1836), who died young.
- Lady Anne Charteris (1829–1903), who married George Greville, 4th Earl of Warwick in 1852.
- Lady Louisa Wemyss-Charteris (1830–1920), who married William Wells MP for Beverley and Peterborough, in 1854.
- Captain Walter Charteris-Wemyss-Douglas, (d. 1854), who was killed at the Battle of Balaclava.
- Captain Frederick William Charteris (1833–1887), who married Lady Louisa Keppel, a daughter of George Keppel, 6th Earl of Albemarle, in 1864.

They lived at 64 Queen Street in Edinburgh, one of the largest houses in Edinburgh's New Town.

Lady Wemyss died on 16 April 1882. Less than a year later, Lord Wemyss died on 1 January 1883.

Honorary titles
Preceded by The Earl of Wemyss and March	Lord-Lieutenant of Peeblesshire; 1853–1880	Succeeded by Colin James Mackenzie
Masonic offices
Preceded by The Earl of Kinnoull	Grand Master of the Grand Lodge of Scotland; 1827–1830	Succeeded by The Lord Kinnaird
Peerage of Scotland
Preceded by Francis Charteris	Earl of Wemyss; 1853–1883	Succeeded by Francis Charteris
Preceded by Francis Charteris	Earl of March; 1853–1883	Succeeded by Francis Charteris
Peerage of the United Kingdom
Preceded by Francis Charteris	Baron Wemyss; 1853–1883; Member of the House of Lords (1853–1883)	Succeeded by Francis Charteris
