= Charles Coltman-Rogers =

British agriculturalist and politician

Charles Coltman Coltman-Rogers (born Charles Coltman Rogers; 1854 – 19 May 1929) was a British agriculturalist and Liberal Party politician.

Educated at Eton and Brasenose College, Oxford, he was prominent in local government and agricultural policy in Radnorshire and Shropshire from the 1870s until his death. He sat briefly in the House of Commons from 1884 to 1885 as the Member of Parliament (MP) for Radnor (UK Boroughs). In 1922 he became Lord Lieutenant of Radnorshire, a position he held until his death.

Parliament of the United Kingdom
Preceded by Samuel Williams	Member of Parliament for Radnor Boroughs; 1884–1885	Constituency abolished
