= Samuel Williams (British politician) =

British politician (1842–1926)

Samuel Charles Evan Williams (20 May 1842 – 2 March 1926) was a British politician.

He was elected as a Liberal Member of Parliament representing Radnor in 1880 before resigning in 1884.

Parliament of the United Kingdom
Preceded by Marquess of Hartington	Member of Parliament for Radnor; 1880–1884	Succeeded by Charles Rogers
