= Gesualdo Lanza =

Italian composer

Gesualdo Lanza (1779–1859) was an Italian teacher of music who made his career in London.

== Life ==
Born in Naples in 1779, he was son of Giuseppe Lanza, an Italian composer who spent many years in England, and for some time was musician to John Hamilton, 1st Marquess of Abercorn. He composed the music for Arbitration, Outwitted at Last and The Deserts of Arabia premiered at the Covent Garden Opera House on 20 November 1806, the principal characters included Miss Brunton (later Louisa, Countess of Craven) and Mrs Maria Theresa Kemble From his father Gesualdo received instruction in music, and became known in London as a singing-master. Among his pupils were Catherine Stephens (1807) and Anna Maria Tree (1812).

In 1829 he produced proposals for a Royal Panarmonion Theatre and Pleasure Gardens in King's Cross, London. The project was unsuccessful and he was declared bankrupt in 1830. His architect, who was also declared bankrupt, was Stephen Geary.

In 1842 Lanza started singing classes for exposition of his theories at 75 Newman Street; the fee was 15 shillings. for twelve lessons. Later the same year he announced a series of lectures, The National School for Singing in Classes, Free to the Public, and on 5 December 1842 he delivered "A Lecture at the Westminster Literary and Scientific Institution illustrative of his new system of Teaching Singing in Classes". He died in London on 12 March 1859. He was buried on the west side of Highgate Cemetery in a common grave.

== Works ==
Lanza published in London in 1817 the well-regarded Elements of Singing familiarly exemplified. His other works included The Elements of Singing in the Italian and English Styles (London, 3 vols., 1809); Sunday Evening Recreations (London, 1840); Guide to System of Singing in Classes (London, 1842). He also composed a Stabat Mater, preserved in the library of the Royal College of Music, solfeggi, and songs. He collaborated on Henry Rowley Bishop's first work, Angelina.

== Notes ==
Attribution

This article incorporates text from a publication now in the public domain: Lee, Sidney, ed. (1892). "Lanza, Gesualdo". Dictionary of National Biography. Vol. 32. London: Smith, Elder & Co.
