= Lord Lieutenant of Peeblesshire =

Ceremonial officer in Peeblesshire, Scotland

This is a list of people who served as Lord Lieutenant of Peeblesshire. The Lieutenancy has been replaced by the Lieutenancy of Tweeddale.

- Alexander Murray, 7th Lord Elibank 12 May 1794 – 24 September 1820
- Francis Douglas, 8th Earl of Wemyss 10 January 1821 – 28 June 1853
- Francis Wemyss-Charteris, 9th Earl of Wemyss 10 August 1853 – 1880
- Colin James Mackenzie 20 April 1880 – 9 April 1896
- Montolieu Oliphant-Murray, 10th Lord Elibank 22 May 1896 – 1908
- Edward Tennant, 1st Baron Glenconner 27 July 1908 – 21 November 1920
- Thomas Gibson-Carmichael, 1st Baron Carmichael 2 April 1921 – 16 January 1926
- Sir Michael Thorburn 20 February 1926 – 29 August 1934
- Gideon Oliphant-Murray, 2nd Viscount Elibank 5 January 1935 – 1945
- Lt Col William Thorburn 30 July 1945 – 1956
- Sir Ronald Thomson 3 February 1956 – 1968
- Sir Robert Scott 9 October 1968 – 1975
- Scott became Lord Lieutenant of Tweeddale
