= Richard Green-Price =

Welsh Liberal politician

Sir Richard Green-Price, 1st Baronet (18 October 1803 – 11 August 1887), was a Welsh Liberal politician.

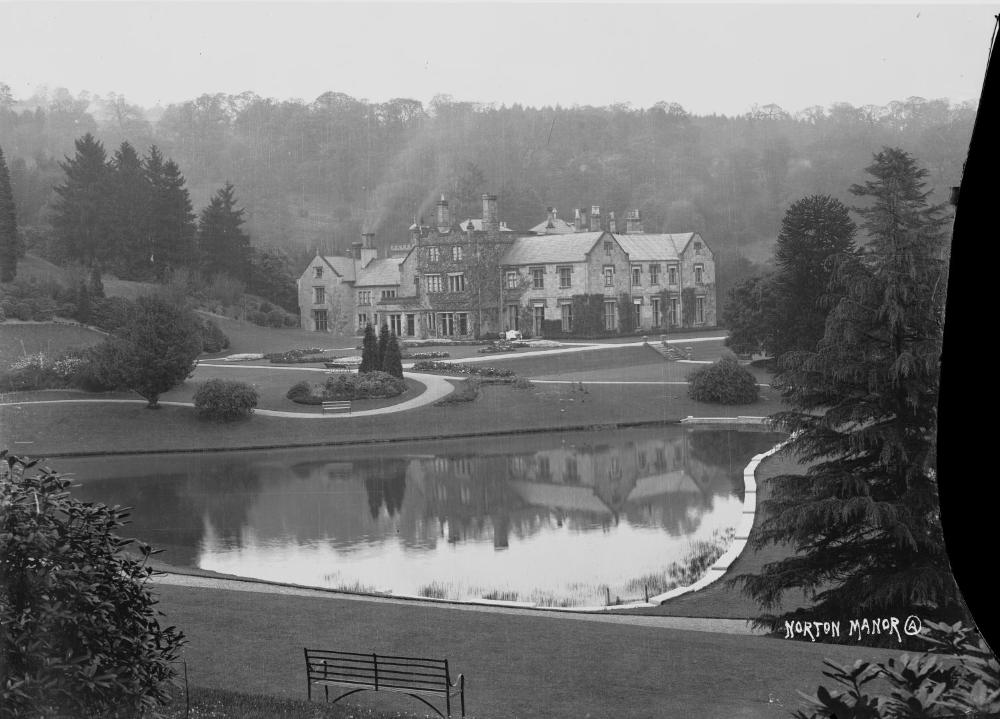
Norton Manor

Born Richard Green, he assumed the additional surname of Price as heir to his maternal uncle Richard Price of Norton Manor, Radnorshire. He was returned to Parliament for Radnor in 1863, a seat he held until 1869, and later represented Radnorshire between 1880 and 1885. In 1874 he was created a baronet, of Norton Manor in the parish of Norton in the County of Radnor and in 1876 served as High Sheriff of Radnorshire.

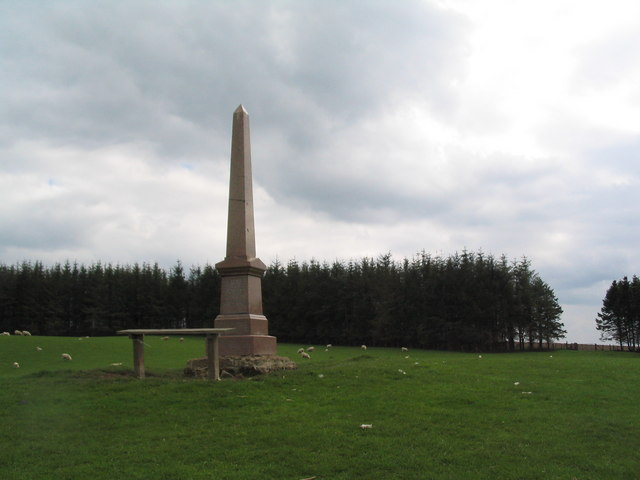
The Price Monument

Green-Price died in August 1887, aged 83. He is commemorated by a Grade-II-listed red granite obelisk near Hengwm Hill north-west of Norton.

Parliament of the United Kingdom
Preceded by Sir George Cornewall Lewis	Member of Parliament for Radnor; 1863–1869	Succeeded by Marquess of Hartington
Preceded by Arthur Walsh	Member of Parliament for Radnorshire; 1880–1885	Succeeded by Arthur Walsh
Baronetage of the United Kingdom
New creation	Baronet (of Norton Manor); 1874–1887	Succeeded by Richard Dansey Green-Price
