= Thomas Lewis (1690–1777) =

British politician

Thomas Lewis (18 October 1690 – 5 April 1777), of Harpton Court, near Radnor was a British politician who sat in the House of Commons for 46 years from 1715 to 1761.

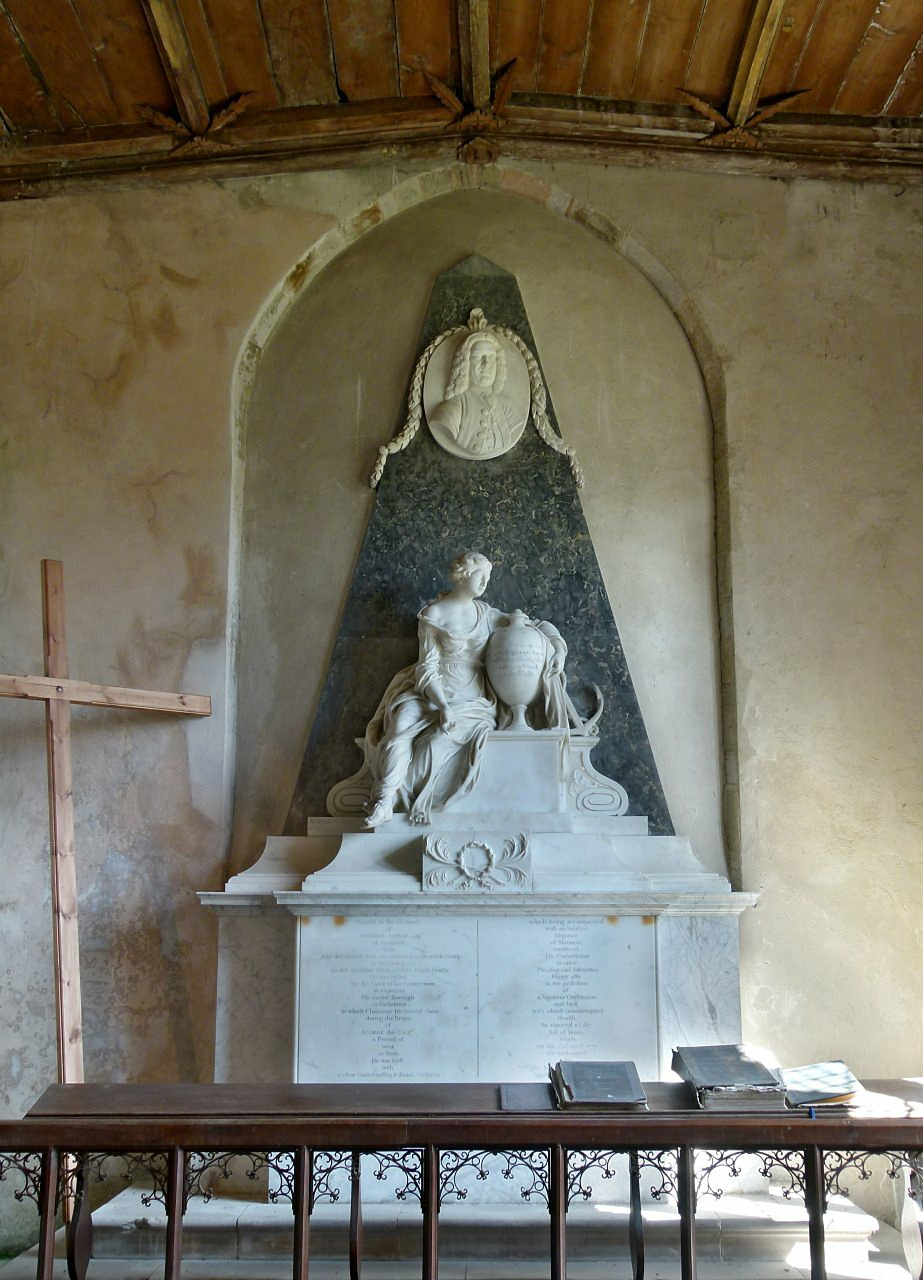
Memorial to Thomas Lewis in St Stephen's Church, Old Radnor

Lewis was the son of Colonel Thomas Lewis of Harpton Court, Radnor and his wife Margaret Howes, daughter of William Howes of Greenham, Berkshire. He matriculated at Wadham College, Oxford on 25 May 1709, aged 17.

Lewis was first elected Member of Parliament for New Radnor at the 1715 general election. In 1716, he voted against the septennial bill, but from then on he supported the government. He was returned for Radnor in the general elections of 1722, 1727, 1734, 1741, 1747 and 1754. He was eventually defeated in 1761.

From 1768 Lewis tried to effect the return of his nephew John Lewis as MP for New Radnor, but he was twice elected and then unseated on petition. On the first occasion it was found there were technical irregularities in the historical creation of freemen in the borough. On the second occasion there was a dispute over the eligibility of non-residents to vote.

Lewis died at Harpton Court in 1777. He had married Ann Wright, the daughter and heiress of Sir Nathan Wright, 3rd Bt., of Cranham Hall, Essex on 12 February 1743. He left no children and was succeeded by his nephew, John Lewis, MP.

Parliament of Great Britain
Preceded by Lord Harley	Member of Parliament for Radnor; 1715 – 1761	Succeeded by Edward Lewis
