= David Murray (1748–1794) =

English lawyer of Scottish noble descent

- Born: 10 May 1748
- Died: 7 May 1794 (aged 45)
- Education: Beverley School, Christ Church, Oxford, Lincoln's Inn
- Occupations: lawyer, British MP
- Years active: 1784–1794
- Spouse: Elizabeth Harley (m. 1783)
- Children: 3 daughters, 1 son
- Father: Rev the Hon. Gideon Murray

David Murray (10 May 1748 – 7 May 1794) was an English lawyer of Scottish noble descent. He sat in the House of Commons of Great Britain from 1784 until his death.

== Early life and family ==
Murray was the second son of Rev the Hon. Gideon Murray, a Church of England clergyman. Gideon was the third surviving son of Alexander Murray, the 4th Lord Elibank, but he had little connexion with Scotland, and raised his family in England.

David Murray was educated at Beverley School, and then at Christ Church, Oxford and Lincoln's Inn, where he was called to the bar in 1773. In 1783 he married Elizabeth Harley, daughter and co-heir of Thomas Harley, a younger son of the 3rd Earl of Oxford. They had three daughters – Elizabeth, Maria-Clara, Louisa – and one son, David Rodney. Elizabeth married the Royal Navy officer William Henry Shirreff.

== Parliament ==
Murray had an electoral interest in Peeblesshire, where his older brother Alexander had been returned at a by-election in 1783, with the support of the dominant interests of the Duke of Queensberry and James Montgomery. Alexander stood down at the 1784 general election in expectation of succeeding his uncle George to become the 7th Lord Elibank, and David was elected unopposed in his place.

At the next general election, in 1790, Montgomery installed his oldest son William Montgomery, who had come of age.

Murray sought a new seat, and was returned for the New Radnor boroughs in Wales with the help of the 4th Earl of Oxford, his father-in-law's older brother. He held the seat until his death in London on 7 May 1794, three days before his 46th birthday.

Parliament of Great Britain
Preceded by Alexander Murray	Member of Parliament for Peeblesshire; 1784–1790	Succeeded by William Montgomery
Preceded by Edward Lewis	Member of Parliament for New Radnor Boroughs; 1790–1794	Succeeded by Viscount Malden
