= Charles Price (Royalist) =

Welsh soldier and politician

Charles Price (died 1645) was a Welsh soldier and politician who sat in the House of Commons variously between 1621 and 1642. He fought on the Royalist side in the English Civil War and is believed to have been killed in a duel.

== Early life ==
Price was probably the son of James Price of Pilleth who had been a soldier in the wars of Queen Elizabeth and an MP for Radnorshire. Price became a soldier, and in 1619 was party to a duel, when he was a second to Sir Robert Vaughan of Llwydiarth who had challenged Lord Herbert of Cherbury. The duel was stopped by James I.

== Political career ==
In 1621, Price was elected member of parliament for Radnor and was a strong supporter of the Protestant ascendancy and parliamentary privilege, and an opponent of monopolies. He was re-elected MP for Radnor in 1624 . He went to Ireland as captain of the Radnorshire and Brecknockshire Militia in 1625. In 1625 he was re-elected MP for Radnor and was returned again in 1626 and 1628 when he remained critical of the court and took an interest in the army and in Welsh measures. He was cited before the council on 22 October 1626. On 18 July 1627 he took recruits to Flanders for Sir Charles Morgan's Staden campaign. He was at Portsmouth with the army when George Villiers, 1st Duke of Buckingham was assassinated on 28 August 1628 and was first to bring the news to Charles I. In parliament in 1629, he was in favour of moderation following the Petition of Right.

In 1637 Price became deputy steward for Rhayader to Philip Herbert, 4th Earl of Pembroke and in 1638 he was serving again in Ireland. He petitioned the council regarding his claims on the Monachdy estate, on which he had redeemed mortgages to keep it in the family. Later he lent King Charles £1000 on the basis of promises regarding the Monachdy estate. He does not appear to have taken part in the Bishops' Wars from 1639 to 1640.

In April 1640, Price was elected MP for Radnorshire in the Short Parliament. He was re-elected MP for Radnorshire for the Long Parliament in November 1640. He served on the committee for privileges and was teller for the ayes when the house divided on the Root and Branch Bill to abolish the episcopacy. He helped prepare charges against Sir Francis Windebank, but was opposed to the action against Strafford . He took an active part in the measures taken to suppress the Irish rebellion of November 1641 and was nominated for a commission in the army sent for that purpose.

On the outbreak of Civil War Price helped to put the royal commission of array into force in Radnorshire, and was the first Welsh MP to be disabled from sitting in parliament on 4 October 1642. He was captured and imprisoned at Gloucester in November 1642 and at Coventry in January 1643, but was released and attended the King's Parliament at Oxford on 22 January 1644.

== Death ==
Price was killed in a duel before May 1645 according to Lord George Digby's Cabinet of 23 March 1646. His family never enjoyed the Monachdy estate and his widow compounded for the Pilleth estate in 1653.

Parliament of England
Preceded by Rowland Meyrick	Member of Parliament for Radnor; 1621–1629	Parliament suspended until 1640
Vacant Parliament suspended since 1629	Member of Parliament for Radnorshire; 1640 – 1642	Arthur Annesley
