= 1884 Radnor Boroughs by-election =

UK parliamentary by-election in Wales

The 1884 Radnor Boroughs by-election was a parliamentary by-election held for the UK House of Commons constituency of Radnor Boroughs in Wales on 30 October 1884.

== Vacancy ==
The by-election was caused by the resignation of the sitting Liberal MP, Samuel Williams who resigned.

== Candidates ==
The only candidate nominated was agriculturalist Charles Coltman-Rogers. and he was thus elected unopposed.

== Result ==
1884 Radnor Boroughs by-election
Party	Candidate	Votes	%	±%
Liberal	Charles Coltman-Rogers	Unopposed		
Registered electors				
Liberal hold				
