= Alexander Murray, 7th Lord Elibank =

Scottish peer (1747–1820)

Alexander Murray, 7th Lord Elibank (24 April 1747 – 24 September 1820) was a Scottish peer.

== Background ==
Elibank was the son of Reverend Gideon Murray, younger son of Alexander Murray, 4th Lord Elibank. His mother was Elizabeth, daughter of General David Montolieu, Baron de St Hypolite, while Patrick Murray, 5th Lord Elibank was his paternal uncle. His brother was David Murray (1748–1794).

== Political career ==
Elibank was returned to Parliament for Peeblesshire in 1783, a seat he held until 1784. In 1785 he succeeded his uncle as seventh Lord Elibank. However, as this was a Scottish peerage it did not entitle him to a seat in the House of Lords. He also served as Lord Lieutenant of Peeblesshire between 1794 and 1820.

== Family ==
Lord Elibank was twice married. He married firstly Mary Clara, daughter of Lewis Charles Montolieu, Baron de St Hypolite, in 1776. After her death in January 1802 he married Christian Catherine Steuart (d.1853), daughter of James Steuart, in 1804. Lord Elibank died in September 1820, aged 73, and was succeeded in the lordship by his son from his first marriage, Alexander.

The son of his second marriage, James Murray (1810–16 February 1844), who became James Erskine Murray on marriage, was an advocate at the Scottish Bar and author before emigrating to Australia in 1841. From Port Phillip he aspired to become a White Rajah through an expedition to eastern Borneo which ended disastrously, but provoked the Dutch to intervene and oblige the Sultan to sign a treaty acknowledging their overall sovereignty over Kutei in 1845. The expedition was reported in newspapers and books, as well as more recent studies.

Parliament of Great Britain
Preceded by Alexander Murray	Member of Parliament for Peeblesshire; 1783–1784	Succeeded by David Murray
Honorary titles
Preceded by -	Lord Lieutenant of Peeblesshire; 1794–1820	Succeeded by The Earl of Wemyss
Peerage of Scotland
Preceded by George Murray	Lord Elibank; 1785–1820	Succeeded by Alexander Murray
