= John Lewis (Radnor MP) =

British Member of Parliament

John Lewis (1738–1797) was a British lawyer and politician who was elected to sit in the House of Commons three times between 1768 and 1780, but was each time unseated within a year.

Lewis was the eldest son of Henry Lewis of Bedford Row, London and his wife Elizabeth Gustaphin and was born on 14 October 1738. He was admitted at Lincoln's Inn on 25 November 1755 and called to the bar in 1764. He married firstly Mary Colby, daughter of Captain Charles Colby, RN on 15 December 1761. In March 1763 he was appointed Receiver of the King’s revenues for Monmouthshire, Herefordshire and Gloucestershire. He became Recorder of New Radnor in 1764 and bailiff in 1766. He succeeded his father on 18 January 1768 and was Recorder of New Radnor again in 1768.

Lewis’s uncle Thomas Lewis, who had been MP for New Radnor for 46 years, wanted to return him as Member of Parliament for New Radnor but there were historical mistakes in the registration of freeman. At the 1768 general election Lewis was elected for Radnor, but was unseated on petition on 7 March 1769. At the 1774 general election the returning officer disallowed most of his opponent’s votes and returned Lewis, but he was again unseated on petition on 20 February 1775. His uncle Thomas Lewis died on 5 Apr. 1777 and Lewis succeeded to his estates at Harpton, near Radnor. His first wife had died in 1774 and he married as his second wife Ann Frankland, daughter of Sir Thomas Frankland, 5th Baronet on 24 March 1778. At Lewis's third parliamentary attempt in 1780 there was a double return and his opponent was successful. With his uncle now dead, he gave up and did not stand again.

Lewis was bailiff again in 1786 and 1791 and was Recorder of New Radnor again in 1792. He was High Sheriff of Radnorshire in 1792-3. He died on 6 November 1797.

Parliament of Great Britain
Preceded by Edward Lewis	Member of Parliament for New Radnor; 1768–1769	Succeeded by Edward Lewis
Preceded by Edward Lewis	Member of Parliament for New Radnor; 1774–1775	Succeeded by Edward Lewis
