= Robert Weaver (MP) =

English politician

Arms of Weaver, adopted c. 1370: Quarterly, 1&4: Or on a fess Azure cotised Gules two garbs Or. 2: Azure on a bend cotised Argent three escallops Gules (Bohun). 3: Sable a lion rampant double-queued Argent (Wastneys)

Robert Weaver (c. 1630 – 1687) was an English politician who sat in the House of Commons from Jan 1659 to Apr 1659.

Weaver was the son and heir of Thomas Weaver, Esq. of Aymestrey, Herefordshire and his wife Anne Lewis of Radnorshire, and cousin to Richard Weaver (MP) and Edmund Weaver (MP). His father served as High Sheriff of Radnorshire in 1646 and died in 1647.

Weaver matriculated at Brasenose College, Oxford on 28 July 1651 and was perhaps a student at Lincoln's Inn, 1649. He served as a justice of the peace for Herefordshire from 1653 to 1657.

In 1659, Weaver was elected member of parliament for the Third Protectorate Parliament representing New Radnor.

Weaver died in 1687. His son and heir Robert is memorialized in the Parish Church of St. John the Baptist and St. Alkmund of Aymestrey.
