= George Capel-Coningsby, 5th Earl of Essex =

English aristocrat and politician

The Right Honourable The Earl of Essex FSA
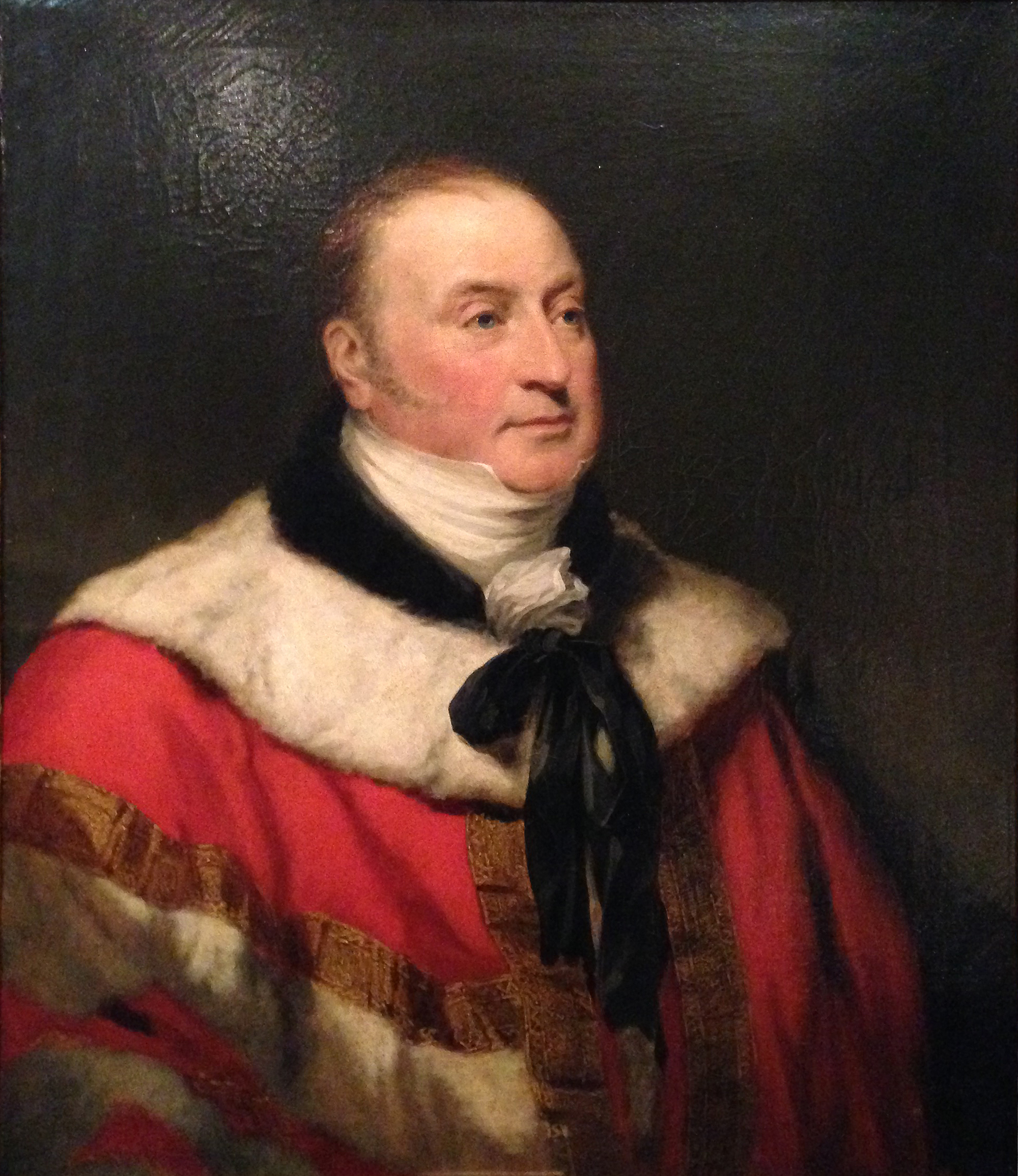
- Portrait of the Earl of Essex from the studio of Sir Thomas Lawrence

Lord Lieutenant of Herefordshire
- In office 1802–1817
- Preceded by: The Viscount Bateman
- Succeeded by: The Lord Somers

Member of Parliament for Radnor
- In office 1794–1799
- Preceded by: David Murray
- Succeeded by: Richard Price

Member of Parliament for Okehampton
- In office 1785–1790 Serving with Humphrey Minchin
- Preceded by: John Luxmoore; Thomas Wiggens
- Succeeded by: John Hayes St Leger; Robert Ladbroke

Member of Parliament for Lostwithiel
- In office 1781–1784 Serving with George Johnstone
- Preceded by: Hon. Thomas de Grey; George Johnstone
- Succeeded by: John Sinclair; John Thomas Ellis

Member of Parliament for Westminster
- In office 1779–1780 Serving with Lord Thomas Pelham-Clinton
- Preceded by: Lord Thomas Pelham-Clinton; Viscount Petersham
- Succeeded by: Sir George Brydges Rodney, Bt; Charles James Fox

Personal details
- Born: George Capell; 13 November 1757 Watford, Hertfordshire
- Died: 23 April 1839 (aged 81) Watford, Hertfordshire
- Spouses: Sarah Bazett (m. 1786; died 1838) Catherine Stephens (m. 1838)
- Relations: Thomas Bladen Capel (half-brother)
- Parent(s): William Capell, 4th Earl of Essex; Frances Hanbury-Williams
- Known for: Commissioned the redesign of Cassiobury House

George Capel-Coningsby, 5th Earl of Essex FSA (13 November 1757 – 23 April 1839) was an English aristocrat and politician, and styled Viscount Malden until 1799. His surname was Capell until 1781.

== Early life ==
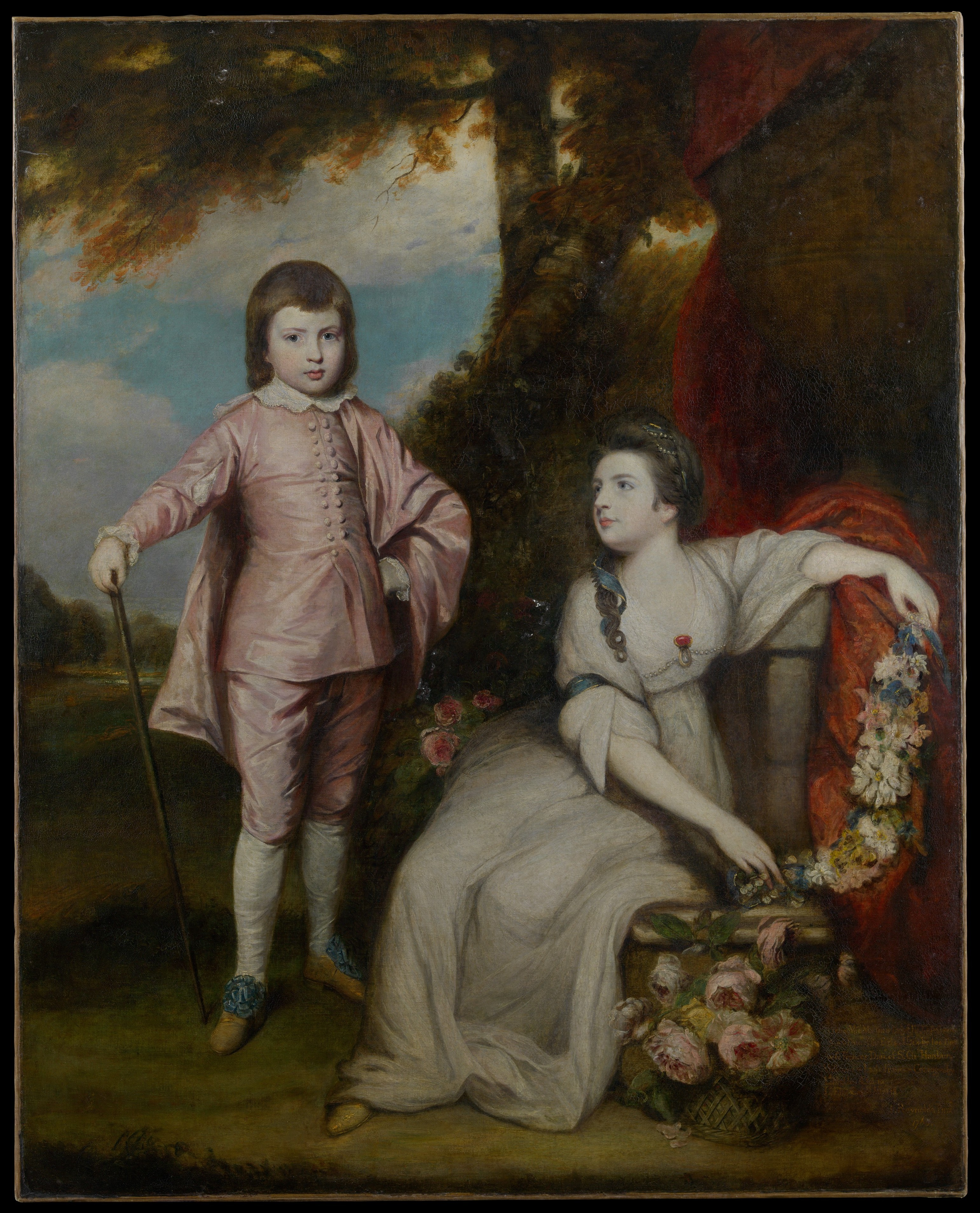
1768 portrait by Sir Joshua Reynolds of George Capel, aged 10, with his sister, Elizabeth Capel.

George Capell was the eldest son and heir of William Anne Capell, 4th Earl of Essex (1732–1799), from his first marriage to Frances Hanbury-Williams. After his mother's death from childbirth in 1759, his father remarried to Harriet Bladen (a daughter of Thomas Bladen of Glastonbury Abbey). From his father's second marriage, he was the elder half-brother of William Robert Capel and Admiral Thomas Bladen Capel of the Royal Navy and one of Horatio Nelson's Band of Brothers.

His paternal grandparents were William Capell, 3rd Earl of Essex and Lady Elizabeth Russell (a daughter of Wriothesley Russell, 2nd Duke of Bedford). His mother was the daughter of Charles Hanbury Williams and Lady Francis Coningsby (a daughter of Thomas Coningsby, 1st Earl Coningsby).

== Career ==
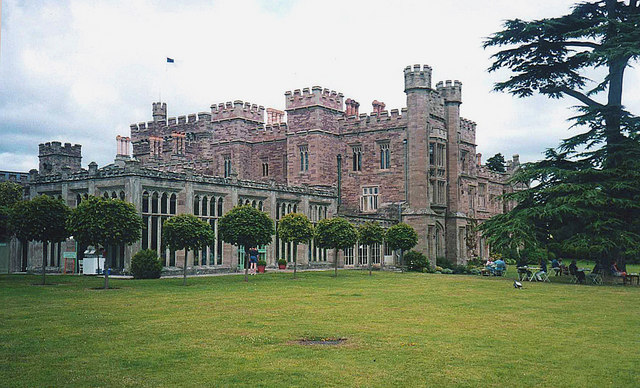
Hampton Court, Herefordshire

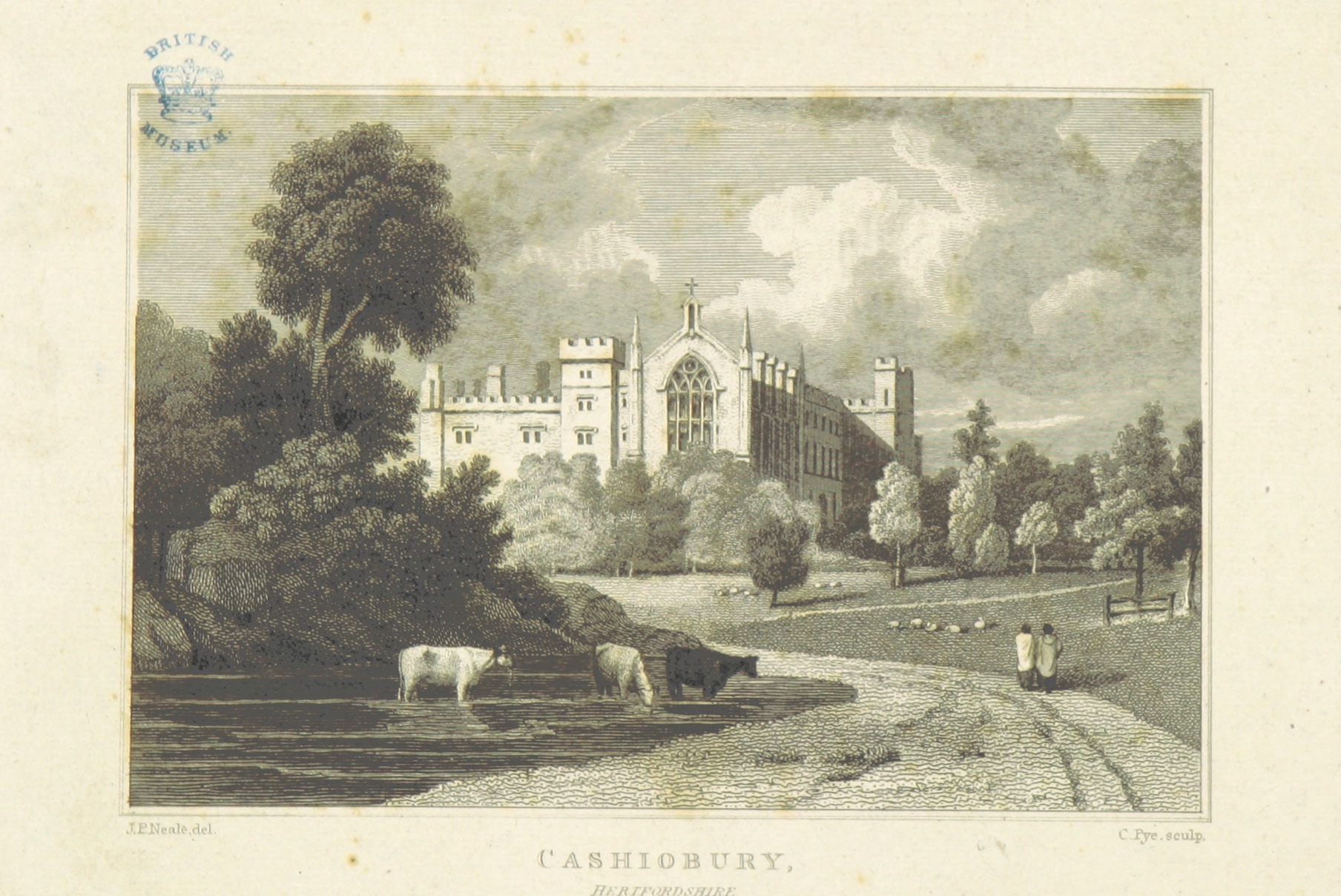
1818 illustration of Cassiobury House after Coningsby's rebuilding

George Capell was educated at Corpus Christi College, Cambridge, receiving his MA in 1777. In 1781 he took the additional name of Coningsby on succeeding to the Hampton Court, Herefordshire estate of his grandmother, Lady Francis Hanbury-Williams, née Coningsby. He later (1810) sold the estate to John Arkwright, the grandson of the inventor and industrialist Richard Arkwright.

He was one of the two members of parliament for Westminster from 1779 to 1780, a member for Lostwithiel from 1781 to 1784, for Okehampton from 1785 to 1790, and for Radnor from 1794 to 1799.

On 4 March 1799 Capel-Coningsby succeeded his father as 5th Earl of Essex. He served as Recorder and High Steward of Leominster in 1802, and as Lord Lieutenant of Herefordshire from 1802 to 1817, taking direct command of the Herefordshire Militia for three years as he rooted out the abuses in the regiment condoned by his predecessor. He became a Fellow of the Society of Antiquaries in 1801, and received an honorary D.C.L. from Oxford University in 1810.

Upon his succession to the title of Earl of Essex, he set about a major reconstruction of the family seat, Cassiobury House in Watford, Hertfordshire, engaging the services of the architect James Wyatt and landscape designer Humphrey Repton to develop the house and grounds.

Essex was noted as a major patron of the arts and was responsible for building up a large fine art collection at Cassiobury. An obituary of Essex in 1839 records that "his Lordship has richly embellished his house at Cassiobury, as well as his town mansion in Belgrave Square, with numerous choice works of our native painters", and that he had entertained a number of noted British artists of the day at Cassiobury and commissioned works from them, including J. M. W. Turner, Augustus Pugin, John Callcott Horsley, David Wilkie and Edwin Henry Landseer.

=== Estates ===
Lord Malden inherited the Earl of Ranelagh estates from his mother, including extensive lands in Ireland in Co. Roscommon (the town of Roscommon and surrounding townlands) Co. Meath (mostly around the Navan area) and Co Dublin (in the Swords area).

== Personal life ==
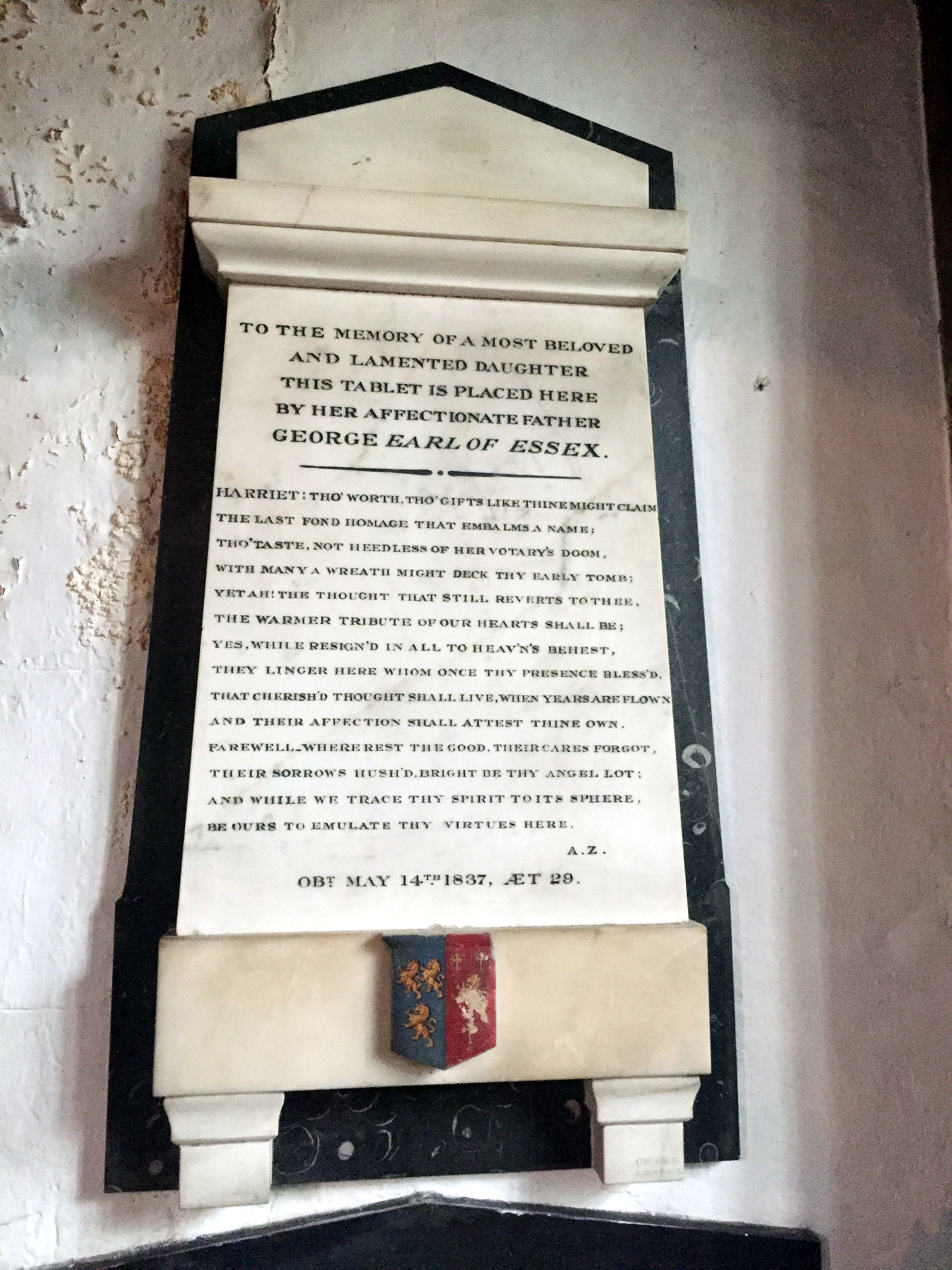
Mural monument to Harriet (Mrs Ford) (1808-1837), illegitimate daughter of George Capel-Coningsby, 5th Earl of Essex, in the Essex Chapel, St Mary's Church, Watford

George Capel-Coningsby was twice married. His first marriage was on 6 June 1786, as her second husband, to Sarah Bazett. Sarah, a widow of Edward Stephenson, was the daughter of Henry William Bazett of Saint Helena and Clarissa Penelope Pritchard. Sarah was a talented and prolific artist, known as "Sarah, Viscountess Malden", and from 1799 as "Sarah, Countess of Essex", who specialised in making watercolour copies of old portraits and other paintings, and her surviving copies in many instances are the only evidence of the now lost originals. George outlived Sarah, who died in 1838.

After Sarah's death, on 14 April 1838 Essex married the opera singer Kitty Stephens, a daughter of Edward Stephens.

Lord Essex died on 23 April 1839 at Cassiobury, aged 81, and was buried at Watford, leaving behind his operatic widow, Kitty Stephens, who was now the Countess Dowager. Because he had no son of his own, his Earldom and estates passed to a nephew, Arthur Algernon Capell, the eldest son of his half-brother John Thomas Capell.

=== Illegitimate daughter ===
He had an illegitimate daughter, Harriet (1808–1837), who married Richard Ford (d. 1858) of Heavitree, Devon. The Earl erected a mural monument to Harriet in the Essex Chapel of St Mary's Church, Watford.

Parliament of Great Britain
Preceded by Lord Thomas Pelham-Clinton; Viscount Petersham	Member of Parliament for Westminster; 1779–1780; With: Lord Thomas Pelham-Clinton	Succeeded by Sir George Brydges Rodney, Bt; Charles James Fox
Preceded by Hon. Thomas de Grey; George Johnstone	Member of Parliament for Lostwithiel; 1781–1784; With: George Johnstone	Succeeded by John Sinclair; John Thomas Ellis
Preceded by John Luxmoore; Thomas Wiggens	Member of Parliament for Okehampton; 1785–1790; With: Humphrey Minchin	Succeeded by John Hayes St Leger; Robert Ladbroke
Preceded by David Murray	Member of Parliament for Radnor; 1794–1799	Succeeded by Richard Price
Honorary titles
Preceded by The Viscount Bateman	Lord Lieutenant of Herefordshire; 1802–1817	Succeeded by The Lord Somers
Peerage of England
Preceded by William Capell	Earl of Essex; 1799–1839	Succeeded by Arthur Algernon Capell
