= Algernon Capell, 2nd Earl of Essex =

English nobleman, soldier, and courtier

The Right Honourable The Earl of Essex PC
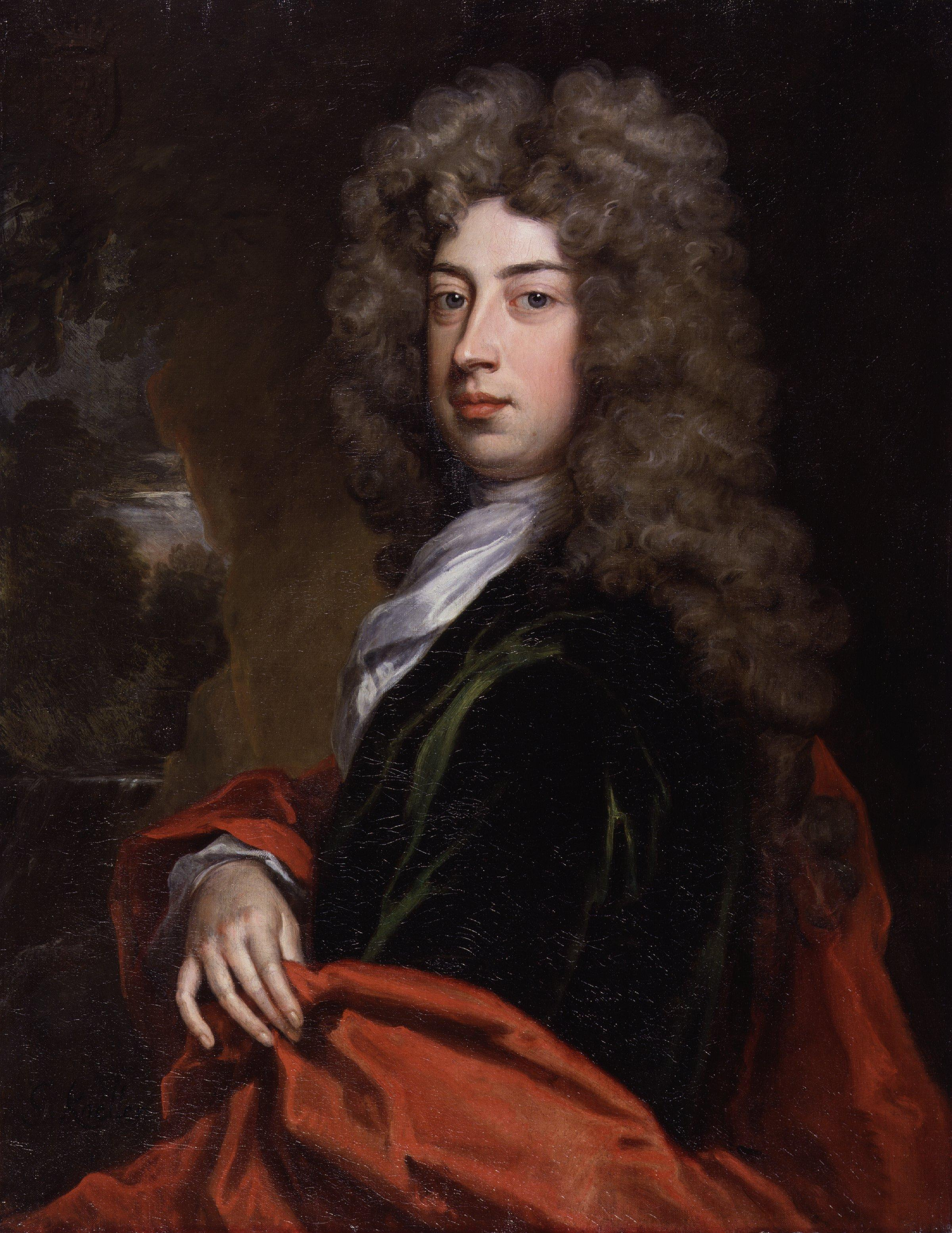
- Portrait by Godfrey Kneller, 1705

Lord Lieutenant of Hertfordshire
- In office 3 February 1692 – 10 January 1710
- Preceded by: The Duke of Shrewsbury
- Succeeded by: The Earl Cowper

Personal details
- Born: Algernon Capell; 28 December 1670 Essex, England
- Died: 10 January 1710 (aged 39) Watford, Hertfordshire, England
- Spouse: Mary Capell, Countess of Essex (m. 1692)
- Children: William Capell, 3rd Earl of Essex
- Parent(s): Arthur Capell, 1st Earl of Essex; Lady Elizabeth Capell

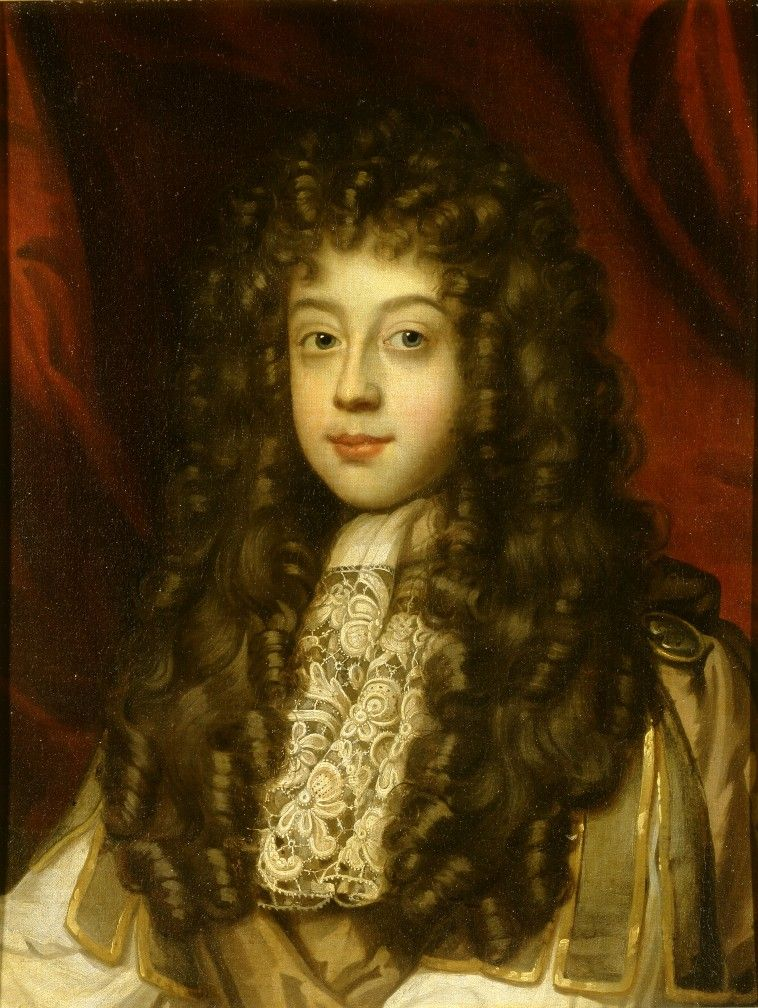
Capell as a boy, portrait by a follower of Willem Wissing (1656–1687)

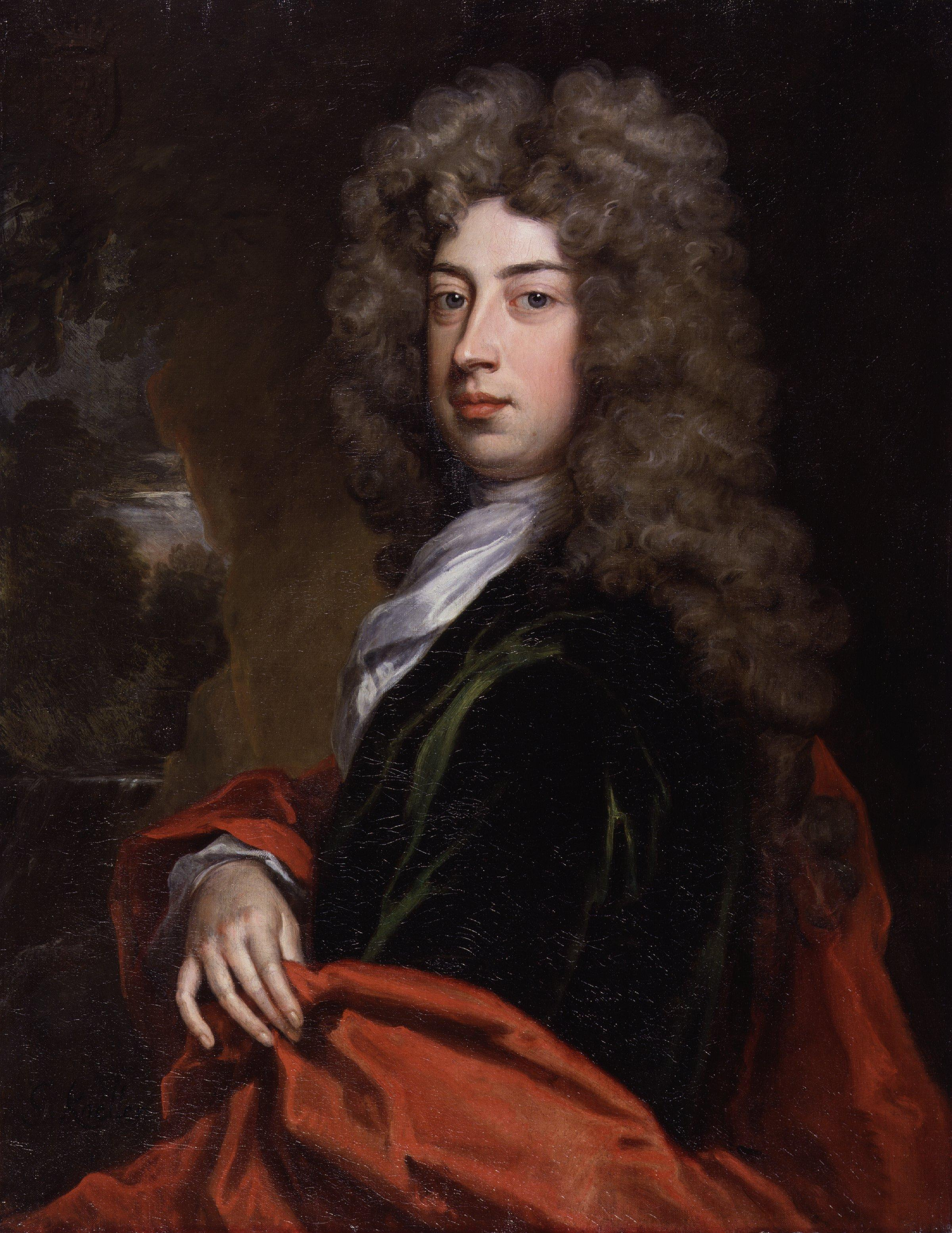
Portrait by Sir Godfrey Kneller

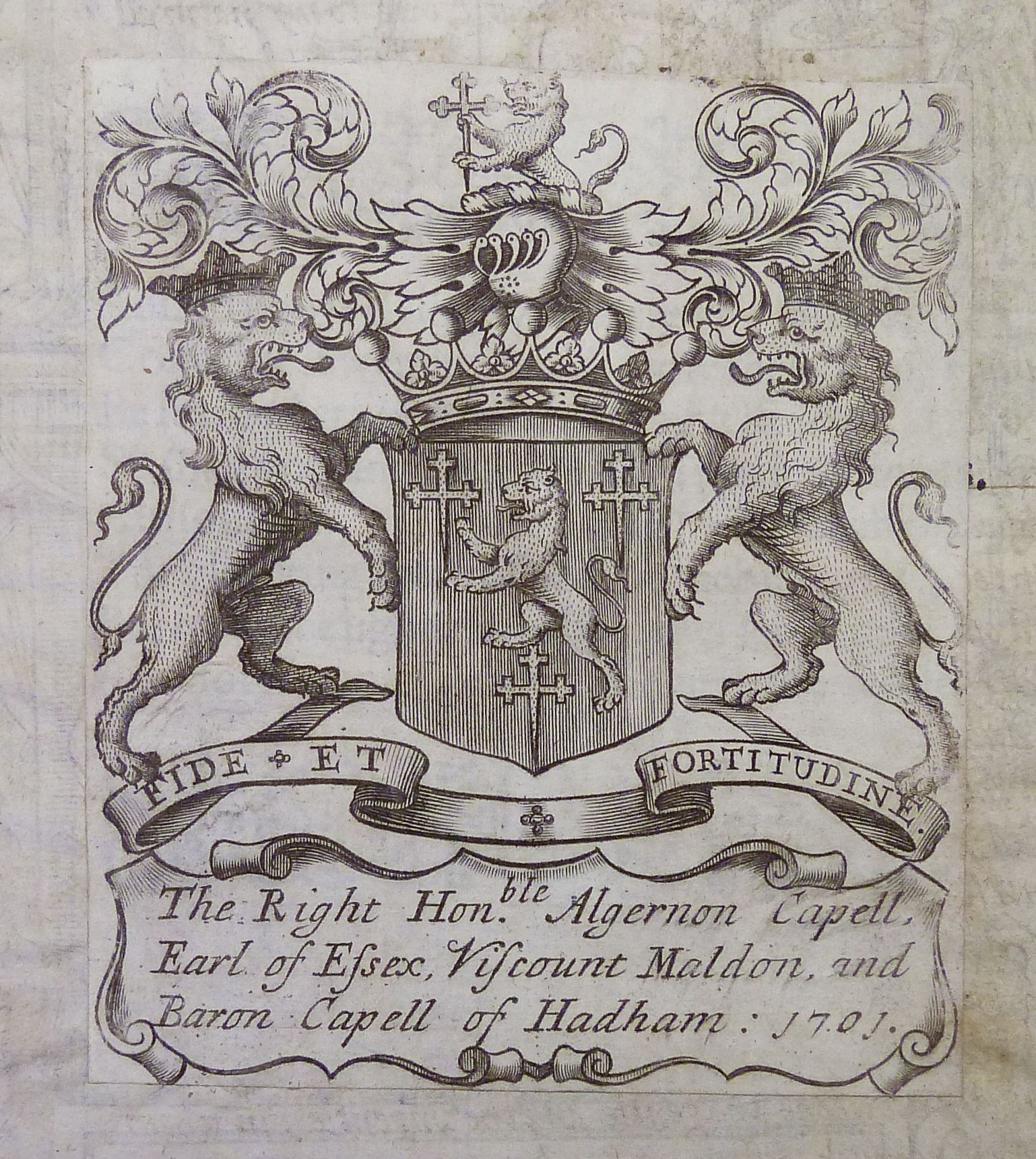
1701 bookplate of the 2nd Earl with armorials of Capell: Gules, a lion rampant between three cross-crosslets fitcheé or

Algernon Capell, 2nd Earl of Essex PC (28 December 1670 – 10 January 1710, Watford) of Cassiobury House, Watford, Hertfordshire, was an English nobleman, a soldier and courtier.

== Origins ==
He was the son of Arthur Capell, 1st Earl of Essex (1631–1683) by his wife Elizabeth Percy, a daughter of Algernon Percy, 10th Earl of Northumberland.

== Career ==
After his father's suicide in 1683, Capell became the 2nd Earl of Essex. He held the office of Gentleman of the Bedchamber to King William III between 1691 and 1702. As Lord Lieutenant of Hertfordshire he was Colonel of the Hertfordshire Militia in 1697. He was Colonel of the 4th Dragoons between 1693 and 1710. In 1708 was made a Privy Counsellor by Queen Anne.

== Marriage and children ==
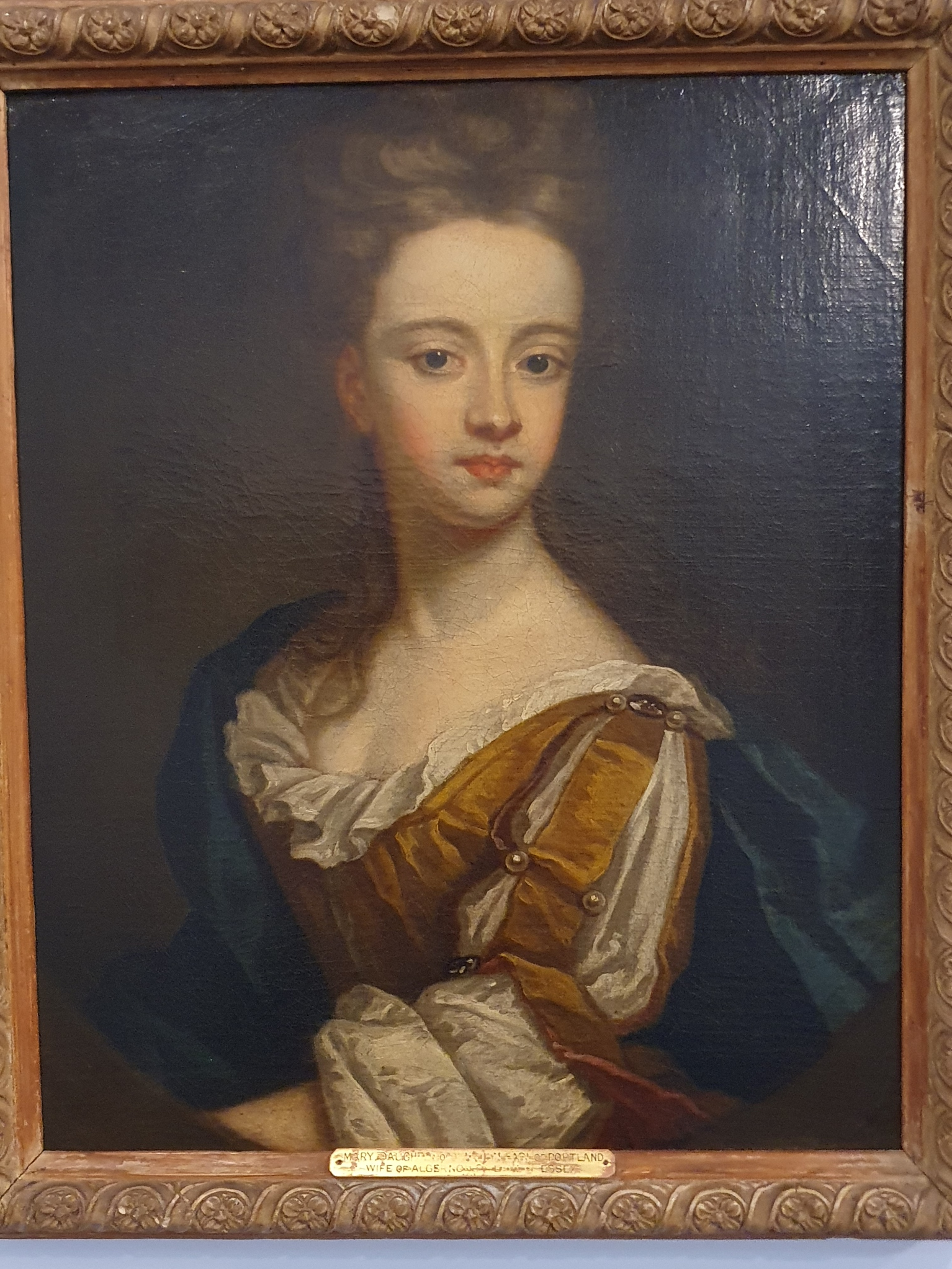
Lady Mary Capell (née Bentinck), Countess of Essex, circa 1698 from the studio of Sir Godfrey Kneller and now in the Watford Museum.

On 28 February 1692 Algernon Capell married Mary Bentinck, a daughter of William Bentinck, 1st Earl of Portland by his wife Anne Villiers, by whom he had three children:

- William Capell, 3rd Earl of Essex (1697–1743), son and heir, who married twice. Firstly to Lady Jane Hyde (died January 1723/24), daughter of Henry Hyde, 4th Earl of Clarendon, by whom he had two daughters. Secondly to Lady Elizabeth Russell (died 8 June 1784), a daughter of Wriothesley Russell, 2nd Duke of Bedford, by whom he had children including William Capell, 4th Earl of Essex.
- Lady Mary Capel (died 12 November 1762), wife of Alan Brodrick, 2nd Viscount Midleton (died 8 June 1747), with issue.
- Lady Elizabeth Capell, who married twice: Firstly to Samuel Molyneux, without issue. Secondly to Nathaniel St. André, without issue.

Military offices
Preceded by The Viscount Fitzhardinge	Colonel of the Princess Anne of Denmark's Regiment of Dragoons; 1693–1710	Succeeded by Sir Richard Temple
Honorary titles
Preceded by The Earl of Shrewsbury	Lord Lieutenant of Hertfordshire; 1692–1710	Succeeded by The Lord Cowper
Preceded by The Earl of Abingdon	Constable of the Tower; Lord Lieutenant of the Tower Hamlets; 1706–1710	Succeeded by The Earl Rivers
Peerage of England
Preceded by Arthur Capell	Earl of Essex; 1683–1710	Succeeded by William Capell
