= Elizabeth Capell, Countess of Essex =

English noblewoman

Elizabeth Percy
- Countess of Essex; Viscountess Malden
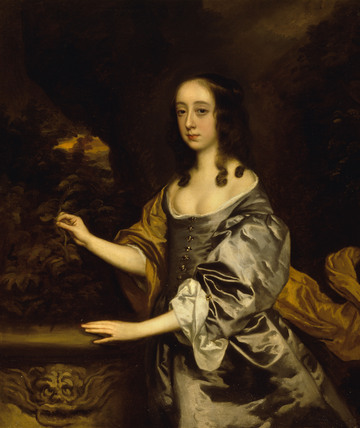
- Portrait of Lady Elizabeth Percy by Sir Peter Lely, 1653
- Born: 1 December 1636; Petworth Manor, Sussex, England
- Died: 5 February 1718 (aged 61)
- Noble family: Percy
- Spouse: Arthur Capell, 1st Earl of Essex (m. 1653; died 1683)
- Issue: Algernon Capell, 2nd Earl of Essex; Anne de Vere Capell, Unknown Child
- Father: Algernon Percy, 10th Earl of Northumberland
- Mother: Lady Anne Cecil

Elizabeth Capell, Countess of Essex (1 December 1636 – 5 February 1718; née Percy) was an English noblewoman, the daughter of Algernon Percy, 10th Earl of Northumberland. She was the wife of Arthur Capell, 1st Earl of Essex. Elizabeth was the subject of a portrait by court painter Sir Peter Lely.

== Family ==
Lady Elizabeth was born on 1 December 1636 at Petworth Manor, Sussex, England, one of the five daughters of Algernon Percy, 10th Earl of Northumberland by his first wife, Lady Anne Cecil. She had one older surviving sister, Anne who married Philip Stanhope, 2nd Earl of Chesterfield. Her paternal grandparents were Henry Percy, 9th Earl of Northumberland, known by his sobriquet of The Wizard Earl, and Dorothy Devereux, the sister of Robert Devereux, 2nd Earl of Essex.

Elizabeth's maternal grandparents were William Cecil, 2nd Earl of Salisbury and Lady Catherine Howard. When Elizabeth was just a year old, her mother died; her father married secondly in 1642, Lady Elizabeth Howard. Elizabeth had a younger half-brother from her father's second marriage, Joceline Percy, 11th Earl of Northumberland.

== Marriage and issue ==
On 19 May 1653 at Petworth, Elizabeth married Arthur Capell, 2nd Baron Capell of Hadham. On 20 August 1661, he was created Viscount Malden and the first Earl of Essex by King Charles II of England; Elizabeth was henceforth styled as the Countess of Essex. The marriage produced one surviving son, a daughter and another issue with not much of a historical record:

- Algernon Capell, 2nd Earl of Essex (28 December 1670 – 10 January 1710), married Mary Bentinck, by whom he had one son William Capell, 3rd Earl of Essex who in his turn married Lady Jane Hyde, by whom he had issue.
- Anne de Vere Capell (1675- 14 October 1752), married on 25 July 1688, Charles Howard, 3rd Earl of Carlisle, by whom she had two sons and four daughters. She had five other sons who all died in early infancy.
- Unknown Child (1668- )

In 1672, Elizabeth's husband was made a Privy Counsellor, and appointed Lord Lieutenant of Ireland. He was dedicated to stamping out English corruption in Ireland; one of his many acts was to prevent Phoenix Park in Dublin from being granted to King Charles's former mistress Barbara Villiers who had been promised the Park as well as the fertile lands surrounding it as a gift from the king. In point of fact, it was due to the Earl of Essex that Phoenix Park continues to exist in the 21st century.

In 1677, the Essexes returned to England; in 1679, the Earl was appointed First Lord of the Treasury. He was implicated in the Rye House Plot in June 1683 and sent to the Tower of London. It was there on 13 July 1683 that he committed suicide by cutting his own throat, leaving Elizabeth a widow at the age of forty-six. She never remarried.

== Death ==
She died on 5 February 1718, and was buried in Watford, Hertfordshire.

== Art ==
Elizabeth Percy was the subject of a portrait by the celebrated court painter, Sir Peter Lely. It was painted in 1653, the year of her marriage, when she was sixteen years old.

== Ancestry ==
Ancestors of Elizabeth Capell, Countess of Essex

Sir Thomas Percy
Henry Percy, 8th Earl of Northumberland
Eleanor Harbottle
Henry Percy, 9th Earl of Northumberland
John Neville, 4th Baron of Latimer
Lady Catherine Neville
Lady Lucy Somerset
Algernon Percy, 10th Earl of Northumberland
Sir Richard Devereux
Walter Devereux, 1st Earl of Essex
Dorothy Hastings
Dorothy Devereux
Sir Francis Knollys
Lettice Knollys
Lady Catherine Carey
Elizabeth Percy
William Cecil, 1st Baron Burghley
Robert Cecil, 1st Earl of Salisbury
Mildred Cooke
William Cecil, 2nd Earl of Salisbury
William Brooke, 10th Baron Cobham
Elizabeth Brooke
Frances Newton
Lady Anne Cecil
Thomas Howard, 4th Duke of Norfolk
Thomas Howard, 1st Earl of Suffolk
Margaret Audley
Lady Catherine Howard
Sir Henry Knyvet
Katherine Knyvet
Elizabeth Stumpe
