= Mary Capell, Countess of Essex =

The Right Honourable The Countess of Essex
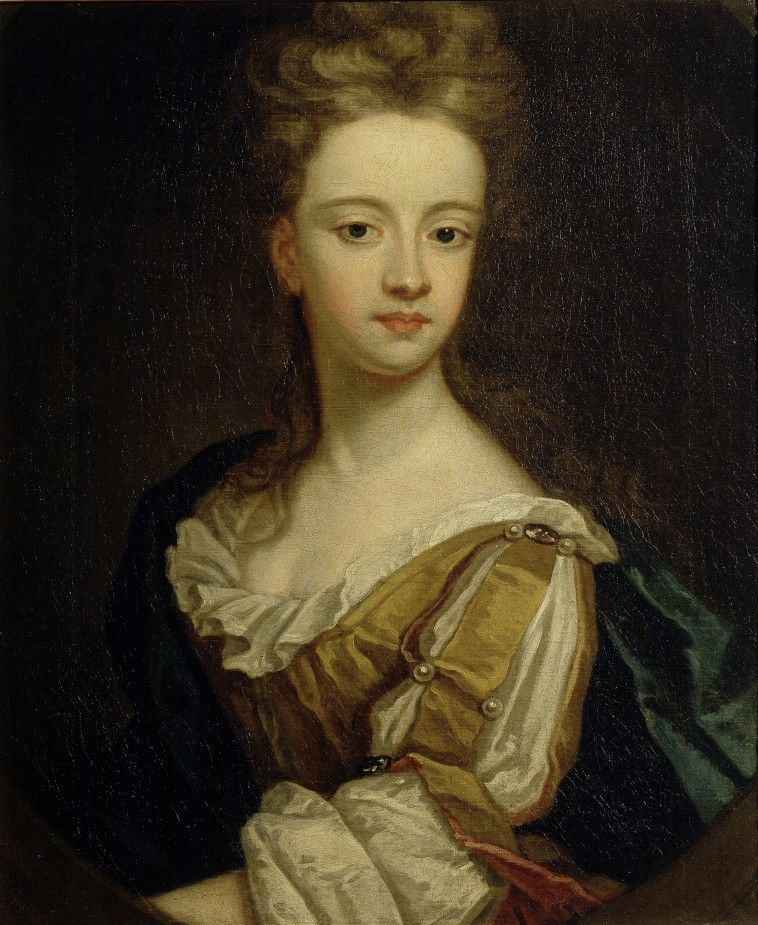
- Portrait of Lady Mary Bentinck by Godfrey Kneller, 1692
- Tenure: 1698–1714
- Known for: Hampton Court Beauties
- Born: Mary Bentinck; 1679
- Died: 26 August 1726 (aged 46–47)
- Spouses: Algernon Capell, 2nd Earl of Essex; Sir Conyers Darcy
- Issue: 3, including William
- Parents: William Bentinck, 1st Earl of Portland; Anne Villiers

Mary Capell, Countess of Essex (1679 – 20 August 1726), born Lady Mary Bentinck, was the daughter of William Bentinck, 1st Earl of Portland, a Dutch and English nobleman who became in an early stage the favourite of stadtholder William, Prince of Orange (the future King of England) and his wife Anne Villiers (died 30 November 1688).

Mary is one of the Hampton Court Beauties who was painted by Sir Godfrey Kneller for Queen Mary II. Despite sharing a surname, Mary's aunt, Barbara Villiers, Viscountess FitzHarding was not the renowned courtesan and Windsor Beauty the Duchess of Cleveland, although there is a relation; the Duchess of Cleveland was Mary's first cousin once removed through her mother, Anne Villiers. Nevertheless, Barbara Villiers was painted by Sir Godfrey Kneller.

== Family ==
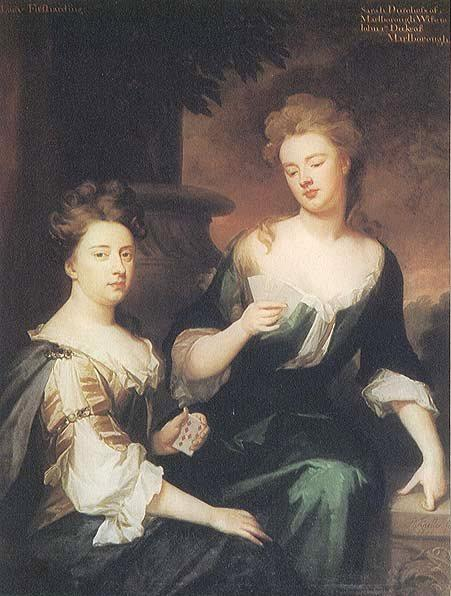
Barbara Villiers(left), maternal aunt to Lady Mary Bentinck, playing cards with her closest friend, Sarah, Duchess of Marlborough, by Sir Godfrey Kneller, c. 1702

Lady Mary's maternal grandparents were Sir Edward Villiers and Lady Frances Howard, daughter of the 2nd Earl of Suffolk and his wife, Lady Elizabeth Home (died 19 August 1633), daughter of the 1st Earl of Dunbar. Through her grandfather, Sir Edward Villiers, she descended from Sir Oliver St. John and Margaret Beauchamp, mother to Lady Margaret Beaufort. Lady Mary's paternal grandparents were Bernard Bentinck, 6th Baron Bentinck of the Netherlands (died 29 July 1668), a descendant of an ancient and noble family of Guelders and Overijssel, and his wife Anne van Bloemendale (died 30 March 1685).

== Marriages ==
Lady Mary married twice.

On 28 February 1692, she married Lt.-Gen. Algernon Capel (1670–1710), 2nd Earl of Essex. The couple had three children.

- William Capell, 3rd Earl of Essex (1697–1743), married twice.

1st: Lady Jane Hyde (died January 1723/24), daughter of the 4th Earl of Clarendon. The marriage produced two daughters.
2nd: Lady Elizabeth Russell (died 8 June 1784), daughter of the 2nd Duke of Bedford. Their son, William, became the 4th Earl of Essex.

- Lady Mary Capel (died 12 November 1762), married Alan Brodrick, 2nd Viscount Midleton (d. 8 June 1747), had issue.
- Lady Elizabeth Capell. She married twice,

1st: Samuel Molyneux,
2nd: Nathaniel St. André. Both marriages were childless.

On 2 August 1714, she married Rt. Hon. Sir Conyers Darcy (died 1758), son of Hon. John Darcy (1659–1688) and Bridget Sutton. The marriage was childless.

== Titles ==
- 1679 – 28 February 1698: Lady Mary Bentinck
- 28 February 1698 – 10 January 1710: Mary Capell, Countess of Essex
- 10 January 1710 – 2 August 1714: Mary Capell, Dowager Countess of Essex
- 2 August 1714 – 20 August 1726: Lady Mary Darcy

== Ancestry ==
Ancestors of Mary Capell, Countess of Essex

16. Eusebius Bentinck, 4th Baron Bentinck of the Netherlands
8. Hendrik Bentinck, 5th Baron Bentinck of the Netherlands
17. Sophia d'Ittersum
4. Bernard Bentinck, 6th Baron Bentinck of the Netherlands
9. Anne Beninga
2. William Bentinck, 1st Earl of Portland
10. Hans Hendrik van Bloemendale, Seneschal of Vianen
5. Anne van Bloemendale
1. Lady Mary Bentinck, Countess of Essex
24. Sir George Villiers of Brokesby
12. Sir Edward Villiers, Master of the Mint
25. Audrey Saunders
6. Sir Edward Villiers
26. Sir John St. John
13. Barbara St. John
27. Lucy Hungerford
3. Anne Villiers
28. Thomas Howard, 1st Earl of Suffolk
14. Theophilus Howard, 2nd Earl of Suffolk
29. Catherine Knyvet
7. Lady Frances Howard
30. George Home, 1st Earl of Dunbar
15. Lady Elizabeth Home
31. Catherine Gordon

== Sources ==
- Field, Ophelia. The Favourite: Sarah, Duchess of Marlborough. London: Hodder and Stoughton, 2002. (ISBN 0-340-76808-8)
