= Catherine Stephens, Countess of Essex =

British actress and singer

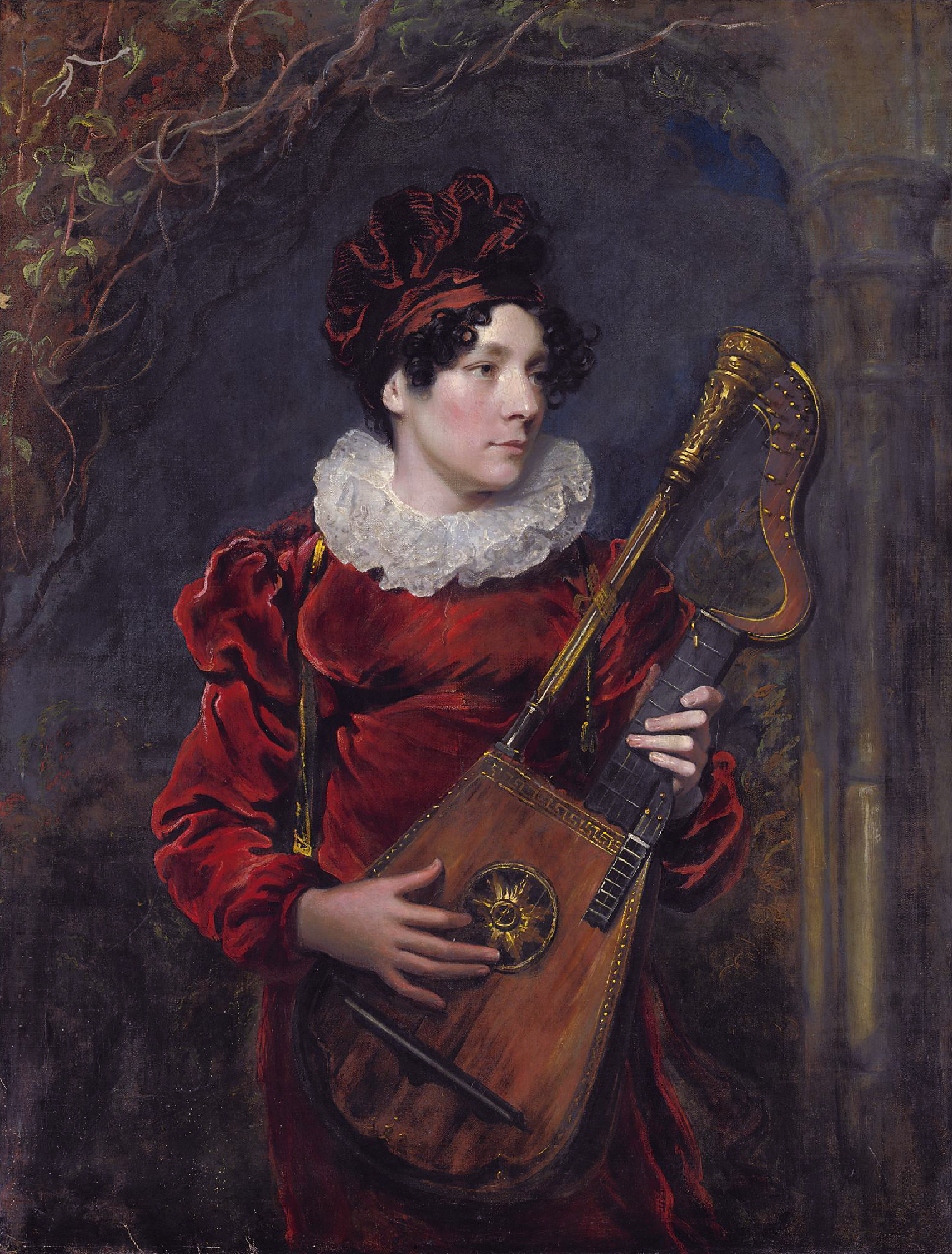
Kitty Stephens, later Countess of Essex, by George Henry Harlow

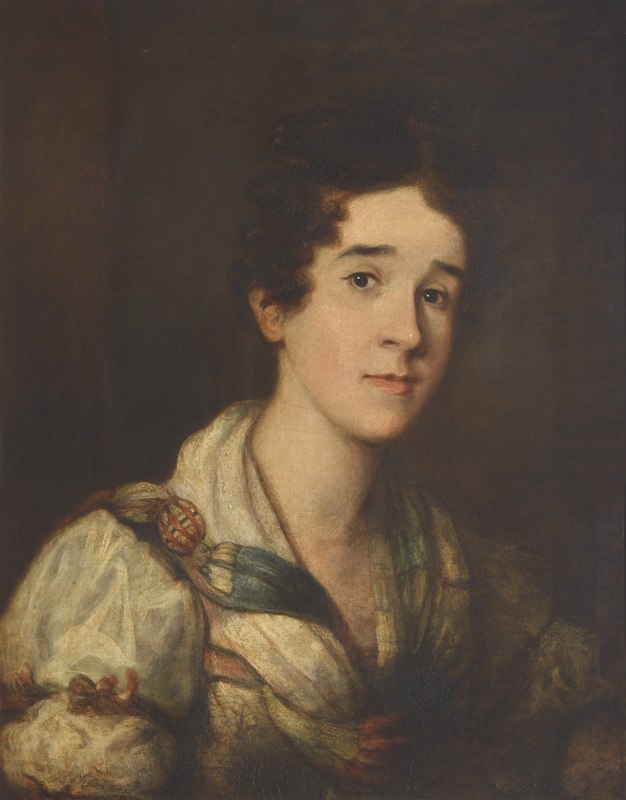
Portrait of Catherine Stephens, by George Henry Harlow, c. 1805

Catherine Stephens, Countess of Essex (18 September 1794 – 22 February 1882) was an English operatic singer and actress, once known as Kitty Stephens.

== Early life ==
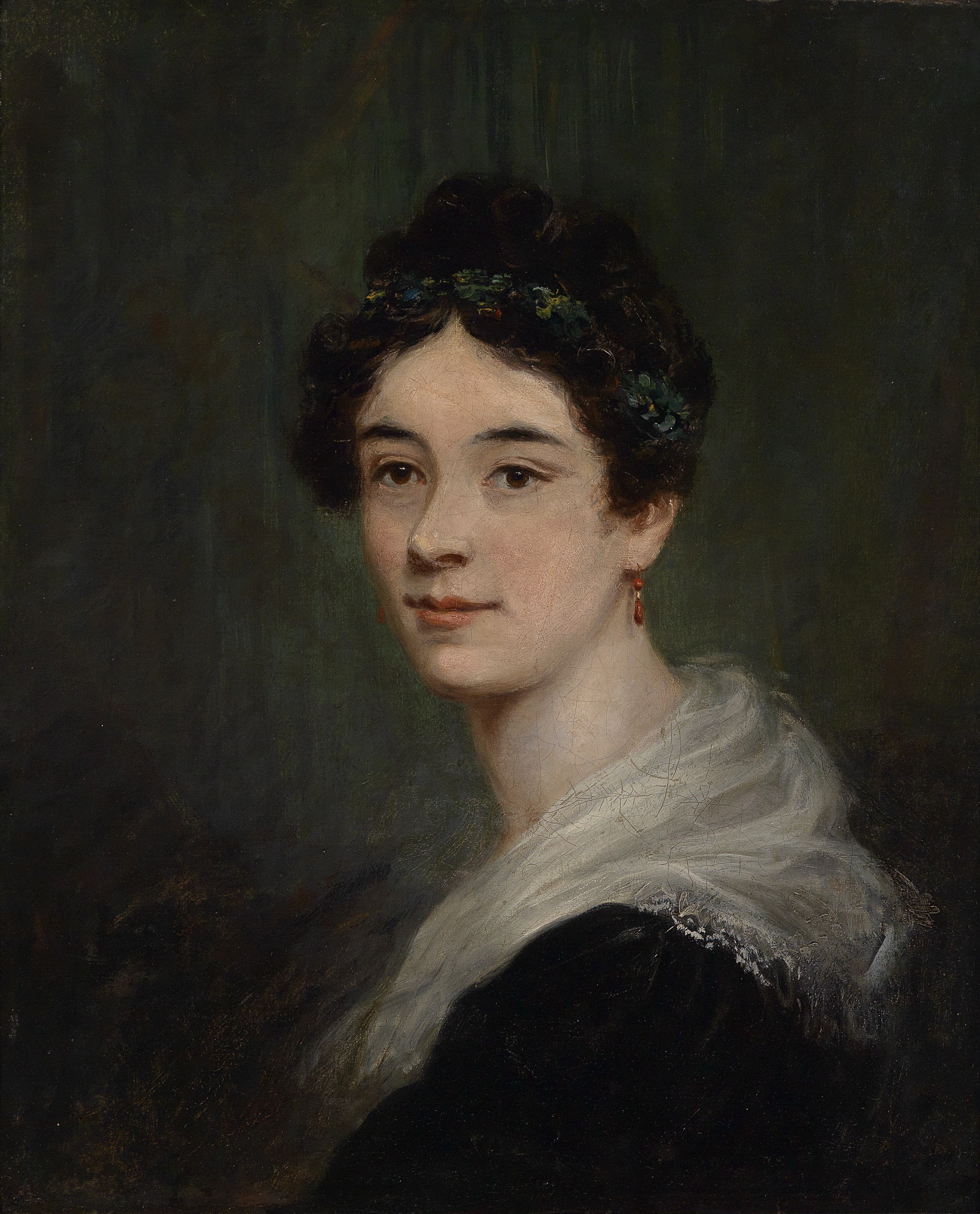
Portrait of Catherine Stephens, attributed to Martin Archer Shee

Stephens was the daughter of Edward Stephens, a carver and gilder in Park Street, Grosvenor Square, and was baptised in January 1792 at George's Hanover Square and may therefore be inferred to have been born in 1791, possibly on the 18th September, but not as is commonly stated 1794. In 1807, having shown, like her elder sisters, some musical ability, she was placed under Gesualdo Lanza, with whom she remained five years. Under his care she sang in Bath, Bristol, Southampton, Ramsgate, Margate and other places, appearing early in 1812 in subordinate parts at the Pantheon as member of an Italian opera company, headed by Teresa Bertinotti. At the close, in 1812, of her engagement with Lanza, her father placed her under Thomas Welsh, as whose pupil she sang anonymously on 17 and 19 November in Manchester.

== Operatic and acting career ==
On 23 September 1813, she appeared at Covent Garden as Mandane in Artaxerxes, obtaining a conspicuous success, especially in the airs 'Checked by duty, racked by love,' and 'The soldier tired of war's alarms,' and being compared to Angelica Catalani and Elizabeth Billington. On 22 October, she sang as Polly in the Beggar's Opera, and on 12 November, as Clara in The Duenna; also Rosetta in Love in a Village. Lanza and Welsh both claimed the honour of instructing her. At the concert of ancient music in March 1814 she was assigned the principal soprano songs, and she sang later in the year in the festivals in Norwich and Birmingham.

At Covent Garden, where she remained with few interruptions from her first appearance in 1813 down to 1822, she at first received £12 a week; this was successively advanced to £20 and £25 a week.

=== 1813 to 1818 ===
On 1 February 1814, she was the original Mrs. Cornflower in the Farmer's Wife of Charles Dibdin, junior. She played Ophelia to the Hamlet of Young and that of Kemble, and on the first occasion (21 March) introduced into the character the song of "Mad Bess", for which she was hissed. She played Matilda in Richard Cœur de Lion, and on 31 May, as Desdemona to Young's Othello, sang the original air of "My mother had a maid called Barbara". On 1 February 1815 she was the original Donna Isidora in William Dimond's Brother and Sister; on 7 April Donna Orynthia in the Noble Outlaw, founded on the Pilgrim of Beaumont and Fletcher; and on 7 June Eucharis in Telemachus.

Next season she was Sylvia in Cymon, Hermia in Midsummer Night's Dream, Imogen, Cora in Columbus, and on 12 March 1816, the first Lucy Bertram in Daniel Terry's adaptation of Guy Mannering. Among original parts in lesser works in the next season stands out Diana Vernon in Isaac Pocock's Rob Roy Macgregor. She also played Cowslip in the Agreeable Surprise.

=== 1819 to 1828 ===
On the first production of the Marriage of Figaro on 6 March 1819, she was Susanna to the Figaro of John Liston, and in the premiere of Heart of Midlothian by Daniel Terry, on 17 April, she was Effie Deans. On 14 December she played Adriana in the Comedy of Errors, converted by Frederick Reynolds into an opera. In Terry's Antiquary on 25 January 1820, she was the first Isabella Wardour, and in an adaptation of Ivanhoe, which followed on 2 March, she was Rowena.She played Florence St. Leon in Henri Quatre, or Paris in the Olden Time. In Don John, or the Two Violettas, 20 February 1821, an opera based by Reynolds on the Chances, altered from Fletcher by the Duke of Buckingham, she was the second Violetta. She played Dorinda in John Dryden's Tempest.

On 23 August 1821, she was in Ireland, where she sang in the Round Room of the Mansion House, Dublin in the presence of King George IV.

On 14 February 1822, she was the first Annot Lyle in Montrose or the Children of the Mist. On 11 May 1822, she played Nourjadee on the production of George Colman the Younger's Law of Java.

The following season she joined Robert William Elliston at the Drury Lane Theatre, less happily. For her benefit on 27 April 1823, she played Annette in the Lord of the Manor. In Samuel Beazley's Philandering, on 13 January 1824, she was the first Emile, and in Reynolds's operatic version of the Merry Wives of Windsor, on 20 February, Mrs. Ford. On the production of an anonymous version of Faustus on 16 May 1825, she was the Adine (Margaret). Malvina in George Macfarren's Malvina was seen on 28 January 1826; Edith Plantagenet in Knights of the Cross followed on 29 May. Gulnare in Dimond's Englishmen in India was seen on 27 January 1827. In the following season she was again at Covent Garden, where she played Blanch Mackay in Carron Side, or the Fête Champêtre, on 27 May 1828.

=== Concert singer ===
High as was the reputation Stephens made in opera, it was still higher as a concert singer. She sang with John Duruset in Dublin in July 1821 and again in 1825; and in Edinburgh in 1814. She also visited Liverpool and other places. Until her retirement in 1835 she starred at concerts and festivals.

== Later life ==
On 19 April 1838, Stephens married, at 9 Belgrave Square, George Capel-Coningsby, 5th Earl of Essex, an octogenarian widower, who died on 23 April 1839. As Countess of Essex, she survived him forty-three years, taking an interest in theatrical matters. She died of bronchitis on 22 February 1882 in the house in which she was married, and was buried at Kensal Green Cemetery.

== Reputation ==
Stephens was well known for her beautiful soprano voice, particularly of ballads. William Hazlitt, who spoke of her and Edmund Kean as the only theatrical favourites he had, wrote his first theatrical criticism on her in the Morning Chronicle. After hearing her as Polly and as Mandane, Leigh Hunt said that they 'are like nothing else on the stage, and leave all competition far behind;' Thomas Noon Talfourd recalled the days when he heard her send forth 'a stream of such delicious sound as he had never found proceeding from human lips.' William Oxberry gave her unmixed praise. A portrait painted by John Jackson hangs in the National Portrait Gallery, London; another by Dewilde, as Mandane in Artaxerxes, is in the Mathews collection of the Garrick Club, which contains an anonymous portrait.

== Family ==
A Miss Stephens, possibly an elder sister, made, as Polly in the 'Beggar's Opera,' a successful first appearance on the stage on 29 November 1799, and played in 1800 and 1801 Sophia in 'Of Age To-morrow,' Violetta in the 'Egyptian Festival,' Blanche in Mrs. Plowden's 'Virginia,' Rosetta in 'Love in a Village,' and other parts.

== See also ==
- List of entertainers who married titled Britons
