= Sarah, Countess of Essex =

British painter

Sarah Capel-Coningsby
- Countess of Essex
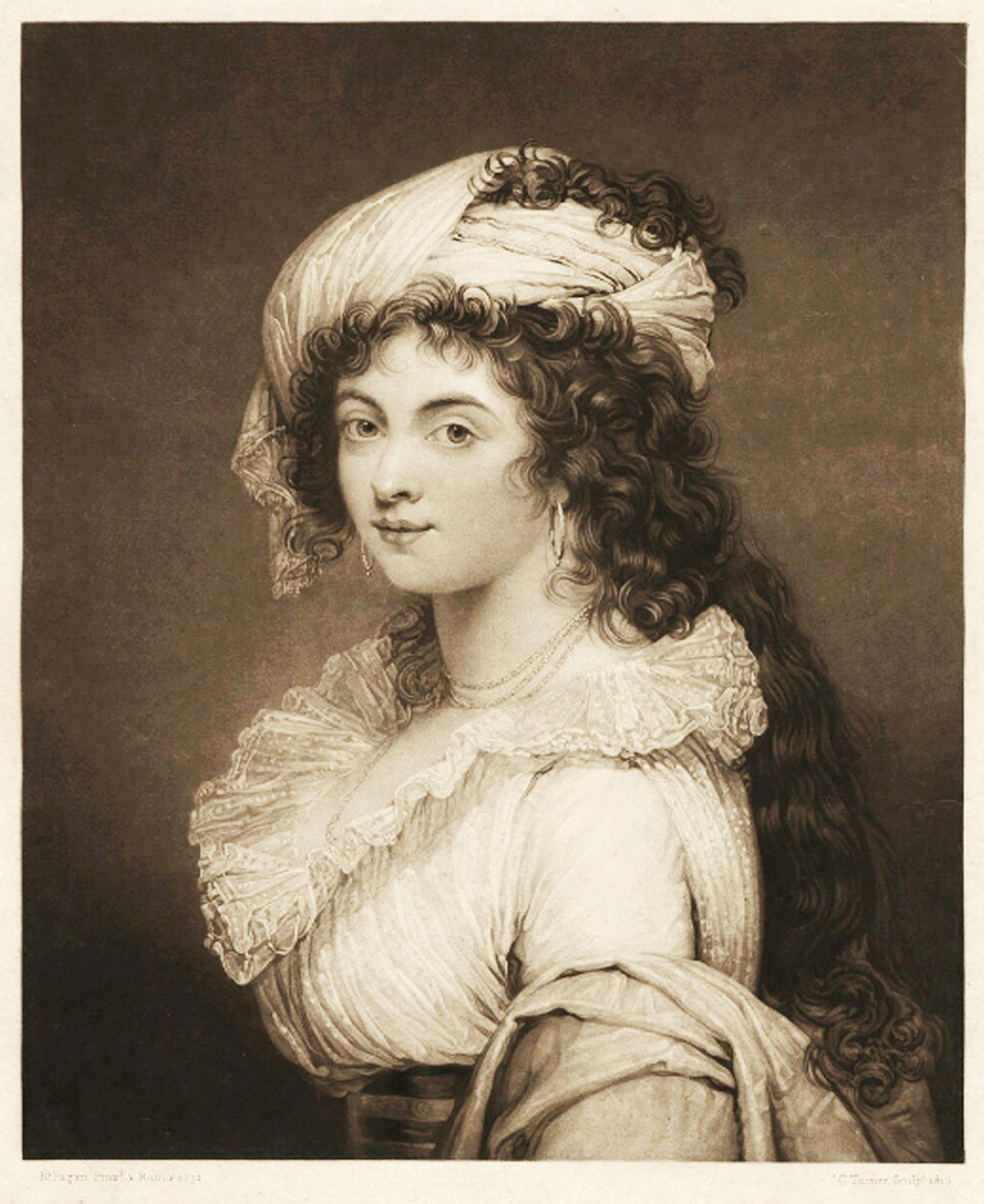
- Ch. Turner after Robert Fagan. Sarah Capell-Coningsby, Countess of Essex/ mezzotint
- Born: 11 July 1759; Saint Helena
- Died: 16 January 1838
- Spouse(s): Edward Stephenson; George Capel-Coningsby, 5th Earl of Essex
- Father: Henry William Bazett of St Helena
- Mother: Clarissa Penelope Pritchard
- Occupation: Painter

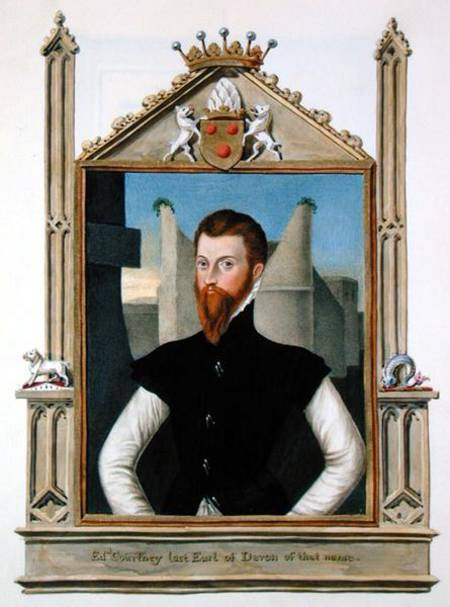
Edward Courtenay, 1st Earl of Devon (d.1556), copy portrait by Sarah, Countess of Essex, published in Memoirs of the Court of Queen Elizabeth (1825)

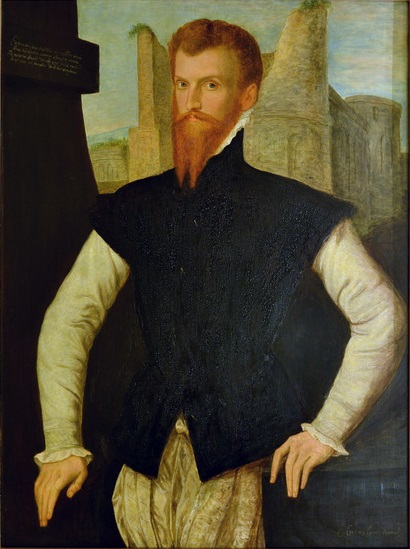
Copy c. 1800 of portrait of Edward Courtenay, 1st Earl of Devon (d.1556) by Steven Van Der Meulen (c1543-1564). Inscribed 'E. Corteney Comes Devonié' (lower right), 42"x31¾", was offered for sale at £4,500 on 23 February 2013 by Timothy Langston Fine Art & Antiques of London at the Powderham Castle Antiques and Fine Art Fair. Similar painting sold by Christie's South Kensington, London, Thursday November 11, 2004, Lot 227, described as oil on panel 42" x 32"

Sarah Capel-Coningsby, Countess of Essex (née Bazett; 11 July 1759 – 16 January 1838) was an English amateur artist. She specialised in making watercolour copies of old portraits of 16th century personages and other paintings, and her surviving copies in many instances are the only evidence of the now lost originals. Over a hundred of her portraits in watercolour and gouache on paper were published in the 1825 edition of Lucy Aikin's Memoirs of the Court of Queen Elizabeth, first published in 1818 as a two-volume work and re-issued in several editions (4th edition 1819, further edition 1823). The fact that she frequently added the subject's coat of arms and other heraldic devices to her copy portraits suggests that she was knowledgeable in the field of heraldry.

== Origins ==
She was born at Saint Helena, the daughter of Henry William Bazett of St Helena by his wife Clarissa Penelope Pritchard.

== Marriages ==
She married twice:

- Firstly to Edward Stephenson.
- Secondly, as his 1st wife, to George Capel-Coningsby, 5th Earl of Essex (d. 1839). In 1799 he succeeded to the titles Baron Capell, Viscount Malden and Earl of Essex).
