= Rhys Lewis (born 1532) =

Welsh politician

Rhys Lewis (born by 1532), of Gladestry, Radnorshire, was a Welsh politician.

He was the eldest son of Ieuan Lewis of Gladestry, MP for Radnorshire.

He was a member (MP) of the parliament of England for New Radnor Boroughs in October 1553 and 1558. He was High Sheriff of Radnorshire c.1578.

He married Sibyl, the daughter of Rhys ap Gwilym ap Llywelyn, and had 4 sons.
