= Radnor (UK Parliament constituency) =

UK Parliament constituency (1542–1885)

- Former borough constituency for the House of Commons

1542–1885
- Replaced by: Radnorshire

Radnor or New Radnor (also called the Radnor District of Boroughs or Radnor Boroughs, especially after 1832) was a constituency in Wales between 1542 and 1885; it elected one Member of Parliament (MP) to the House of Commons of the Parliaments of England (1542–1707), Great Britain (1707–1800) and the United Kingdom (1801–1885), by the first past the post electoral system. In the Redistribution of Seats Act 1885, the division was merged into Radnorshire.

Some very notable politicians represented the constituency in the House of Commons, including Robert Harley, later Earl of Oxford and Earl Mortimer, Sir George Cornewall Lewis, and the Marquess of Hartington, later 8th Duke of Devonshire.

== History ==
=== Composition of the borough before the Reform Act ===
As elsewhere in Wales, the Laws in Wales Acts 1535 and 1542 provided Radnorshire with two members of parliament: one represented the county, and the other a borough constituency named after the county town but including other "contributory boroughs" who were jointly responsible for providing for the upkeep of the MP and, in return, were granted a say in his election. In both cases, the first return of a member was to the Parliament of 1542.

In Tudor times, seven towns apart from New Radnor itself seem to have been regarded at least occasionally as contributory boroughs: Cefnllys, Knighton, Knucklas, Norton, Painscastle, Presteigne and Rhayader. However, by the late 17th century, the exact rights were disputed, and the position was argued before a House of Commons committee after petitions against the result of elections in 1689 and 1690. The committee disallowed the votes from Presteigne and Painscastle (there seem to have been none from Norton to disallow), and thereafter the borough consisted only of New Radnor, Cefnllys, Knighton, Knucklas and Rhayader.

=== Franchise and character of the constituency ===
The right to vote in each of the component boroughs was restricted to the freemen of each town, who did not have to be resident within the borough to vote. The result was that honorary freemen were created solely to swing parliamentary elections, and the inhabitants of the towns which made up the constituency rarely had much say in the choice of MP. This abuse was well established in Radnor by the end of the 17th century (as in other constituencies, both in Wales and England, where honorary freemen could vote), and eventually broke the previously established domination of the Harley family over the constituency; but it was still a matter of grievance to the town in 1779, when the inhabitants complained of it to the House of Commons.

At New Radnor, the town corporation controlled the creation of freemen, but the Steward of the King's Manors had the corresponding power at Knighton, Rhayader and Knucklas. These two sources of power competed with the other main landed interest, that of the Price family, for domination of Radnor elections in the 18th century, but it was the Steward who generally got his way. Henry Lewis was steward from 1746 until his death in 1768 and his brother, Thomas Lewis, was MP from 1715 to 1761 (when he was unseated by the House of Commons because of technical errors in the registration of the freemen that supported him).

The new steward was the Earl of Oxford, but he was unable immediately to take control as the Freemen (Admission) Act 1763 (3 Geo. 3. c. 15) prevented honorary freeman from voting within a year of their creation; however, it transpired that Henry Lewis's patent as Steward had not been properly renewed on the accession of George III in 1760, so that all his more recent creations of freemen were invalid. This immediately undermined Thomas Lewis's majority, and at the 1768 election), although Thomas's son John was declared elected by the returning officer, the result was overturned on petition, the votes of the faultily-created freemen were disallowed, and his opponent Edward Lewis (no relation) was declared elected instead.

By 1774, Oxford's newly created freemen were qualified to vote, but the returning officer (remaining loyal to Thomas Lewis) attempted to disallow the votes of all non-resident freemen. Once more the defeated Edward Lewis petitioned against the result, and was once more successful, the committee deciding that the non-resident freemen of New Radnor and Cefnllys were not entitled to vote but that those of the other three boroughs were; and even in New Radnor and Cefnllys the rights of the non-residents seem to have been restored at the following election. In 1780, the returning officer made a double return, and the Commons decided again in Edward Lewis's favour. From this point onwards, for at least the next thirty years, the Earl's right (and that of his son) to be considered "patron" of the constituency was unchallenged; when in 1790 he withdrew his support from Edward Lewis and instead backed David Murray, Murray defeated Lewis by a two-to-one margin. However, in the last two decades before Reform Richard Price (already the sitting MP) had expanded his personal and family influence sufficiently to be sure of re-election independent of the Oxford interest.

The nature of the franchise dictated that the electorate of the constituency fluctuated considerably over the years, rising when a new creation of freemen was needed to change the balance of voting power, dwindling when the majority was secure since fewer voters made elections cheaper and the constituency easier to manage. In the 1750s there were around 1,000 qualified voters, and as late as 1790 a total of 922 – mostly non-residents – turned out to vote; but the only contested election between then and 1869 was the general election of 1820, when only 268 voters polled.

=== Reform and abolition ===
By 1831, none of the component boroughs was of any considerable size: New Radnor had a population of approximately 2,500, Knighton of 1,076, Rhayader of 669, Knucklas of 236 and Cefnllys of only 28. Under the Great Reform Act the constituency kept its one MP, but Presteigne (which had for centuries been recognised as the county town) was added as a contributory borough, and Rhayader's boundaries were slightly extended. This raised the total population of the constituency to around 6,355, and under the revised franchise there were 529 electors on the register at the 1832 election.

In the entire period between the first and second Reform Acts there was no contested election for the Radnor boroughs. The 1868 reforms doubled the electorate, and from this point onwards the constituency proved a safe seat for the Liberal candidate whenever a contest was held.

The constituency was abolished in the redistribution of seats in 1885, being merged into the Radnorshire county constituency.

== Members of Parliament ==
=== 1542–1640 ===
Parliament	Member
1545	Thomas Lewis
1547	Thomas Lewis
1553 (Mar)	not known
1553 (Oct)	Rhys Lewis
1554 (Apr)	Robert Vaughan
1554 (Nov)	Robert Vaughan
1555	Richard Blike
1558	Rhys Lewis
1559	Robert Vaughan
1562–3	Morgan Price
1571	Rhys Lewis II
1572	Watkin Vaughan
1584	Hugh Davies
1586	Hugh Davies
1588	James Walter
1593	Thomas Crompton
1597	Edward Lewis
1601	Stephen Price
1604–1611	Sir Robert Harley
1614	Rowland Meyrick
1621–1629	Charles Price
1629–1640	No Parliaments summoned

=== 1640–1885 ===
Election	Member	Party
April 1640	Richard Jones	
November 1640	Philip Warwick	Royalist
February 1644	Warwick disabled to sit – seat vacant	
1647	Robert Harley	
December 1648	Harley excluded in Pride's Purge – seat vacant	
1653	Radnor was unrepresented in the Barebones Parliament and the First and Second Parliaments of the Protectorate	
January 1659	Robert Weaver	
May 1659	Unrepresented in the restored Rump	
April 1660	Robert Harley	
1661	Edward Harley	
1679	Griffith Jones	
1681	Sir John Morgan	
1685	Owen Wynne	
1689	Richard Williams	
March 1690	Sir Rowland Gwynne (Note: Gwynne was initially declared the victor at the 1690 election, but on petition the towns of Presteigne and Painscastle were declared not to have the right to vote, and Gwynne's opponent Harley was declared duly elected instead)	
November 1690	Robert Harley	Country Whig
1711	Lord Harley	Tory
1715	Thomas Lewis	Whig
1761	Edward Lewis	Tory
1768	John Lewis (Note: On petition following the 1768 election, John Lewis was declared not to have been duly elected and his opponent, Edward Lewis, was seated in his place)	
1769	Edward Lewis	
1774	John Lewis (Note: On petition following the 1774 election, John Lewis was declared not to have been duly elected and his opponent, Edward Lewis, was seated in his place)	
1775	Edward Lewis	
1780	John Lewis (Note: On petition following the 1780 election, John Lewis was declared not to have been duly elected and his opponent, Edward Lewis, was seated in his place)	
1781	Edward Lewis	
1790	David Murray	
1794	Viscount Malden	
1799	Richard Price	Tory
1834	Richard Price	Conservative
1847	Sir Thomas Frankland Lewis	Peelite
1855	Sir George Cornewall Lewis	Whig
1859	Sir George Cornewall Lewis	Liberal
1863	Richard Green-Price	Liberal
1869	Marquess of Hartington (Note: Hartington was re-elected in 1880, but had also been elected for North East Lancashire, which he chose to represent, and did not sit again for the Radnor boroughs)	Liberal
1880 by-election	Samuel Williams	Liberal
1884 by-election	Charles Rogers	Liberal
1885	Constituency abolished – see Radnorshire	

== Election results ==
=== Elections in the 1830s ===
General election 1830: Radnor
Party	Candidate	Votes	%
Tory	Richard Price	Unopposed	
Registered electors		c. 350	
Tory hold			

General election 1831: Radnor
Party	Candidate	Votes	%
Tory	Richard Price	Unopposed	
Registered electors		c. 350	
Tory hold			

General election 1832: Radnor
Party	Candidate	Votes	%
Tory	Richard Price	Unopposed	
Registered electors		529	
Tory hold			

General election 1835: Radnor
Party	Candidate	Votes	%
Conservative	Richard Price	Unopposed	
Registered electors		517	
Conservative hold			

General election 1837: Radnor
Party	Candidate	Votes	%
Conservative	Richard Price	Unopposed	
Registered electors		551	
Conservative hold			

=== Elections in the 1840s ===
General election 1841: Radnor
Party	Candidate	Votes	%	±%
Conservative	Richard Price	Unopposed		
Registered electors		500		
Conservative hold				

General election 1847: Radnor
Party	Candidate	Votes	%	±%
Peelite	Sir Thomas Frankland Lewis	Unopposed		
Registered electors		462		
Peelite gain from Conservative				

=== Elections in the 1850s ===
General election 1852: Radnor
Party	Candidate	Votes	%	±%
Peelite	Sir Thomas Frankland Lewis	Unopposed		
Registered electors		484		
Peelite hold				

Lewis' death caused a by-election.

By-election, 8 February 1855: Radnor
Party	Candidate	Votes	%	±%
Whig	Sir George Cornewall Lewis	Unopposed		
Whig gain from Peelite				

Lewis was appointed Chancellor of the Exchequer, requiring a by-election.

By-election, 5 March 1855: Radnor
Party	Candidate	Votes	%	±%
Whig	Sir George Cornewall Lewis	Unopposed		
Whig gain from Peelite				

General election 1857: Radnor
Party	Candidate	Votes	%	±%
Whig	Sir George Cornewall Lewis	Unopposed		
Registered electors		447		
Whig gain from Peelite				

General election 1859: Radnor
Party	Candidate	Votes	%	±%
Liberal	Sir George Cornewall Lewis	Unopposed		
Registered electors		407		
Liberal hold				

Lewis was appointed Home Secretary, requiring a by-election.

By-election, 27 June 1859: Radnor
Party	Candidate	Votes	%	±%
Liberal	Sir George Cornewall Lewis	Unopposed		
Liberal hold				

=== Elections in the 1860s ===
Lewis' death caused a by-election.

By-election, 25 April 1863: Radnor
Party	Candidate	Votes	%	±%
Liberal	Richard Green-Price	Unopposed		
Liberal hold				

General election 1865: Radnor
Party	Candidate	Votes	%	±%
Liberal	Richard Green-Price	Unopposed		
Registered electors		443		
Liberal hold				

General election 1868: Radnor
Party	Candidate	Votes	%	±%
Liberal	Richard Green-Price	Unopposed		
Registered electors		841		
Liberal hold				

Green-Price's resignation caused a by-election.

By-election, 25 February 1869: Radnor
Party	Candidate	Votes	%	±%
Liberal	Marquess of Hartington	546	75.7	N/A
Conservative	George Henry Phillips	175	24.3	New
Majority		371	51.4	N/A
Turnout		721	85.7	N/A
Registered electors		841		
Liberal hold				

=== Elections in the 1870s ===
General election 1874: Radnor
Party	Candidate	Votes	%	±%
Liberal	Marquess of Hartington	612	79.1	N/A
Conservative	George W Cockburn	162	20.9	N/A
Majority		450	58.2	N/A
Turnout		774	80.0	N/A
Registered electors		968		
Liberal hold				

=== Elections in the 1880s ===
General election 1880: Radnor
Party	Candidate	Votes	%	±%
Liberal	Marquess of Hartington	Unopposed		
Registered electors		945		
Liberal hold				

Cavendish was also elected MP for North East Lancashire and opted to sit there, causing a by-election.

By-election, 17 May 1880: Radnor
Party	Candidate	Votes	%	±%
Liberal	Samuel Williams	458	54.0	N/A
Conservative	Cecil Alfred Tufton Otway	390	46.0	New
Majority		68	8.0	N/A
Turnout		848	89.7	N/A
Registered electors		945		
Liberal hold				

Williams resigned, causing a by-election.

By-election, 30 Oct 1884: Radnor
Party	Candidate	Votes	%	±%
Liberal	Charles Coltman-Rogers	Unopposed		
Liberal hold				

== Sources ==
- Leigh Rayment's Historical List of MPs – Constituencies beginning with "R" (part 1)
- W. R. Williams The Parliamentary History of the Principality of Wales
- Robert Beatson, A Chronological Register of Both Houses of Parliament (London: Longman, Hurst, Res & Orme, 1807)
- D Brunton & D H Pennington, Members of the Long Parliament (London: George Allen & Unwin, 1954)
- Cobbett's Parliamentary history of England, from the Norman Conquest in 1066 to the year 1803 (London: Thomas Hansard, 1808)
- F W S Craig, British Parliamentary Election Results 1832–1885 (2nd edition, Aldershot: Parliamentary Research Services, 1989)
- T. H. B. Oldfield, The Representative History of Great Britain and Ireland (London: Baldwin, Cradock & Joy, 1816)
- Edward Porritt and Annie G Porritt, The Unreformed House of Commons (Cambridge University Press, 1903)
- Robert Walcott, English Politics in the Early Eighteenth Century (Oxford: Oxford University Press, 1956)
