= Robert Harley (died 1673) =

English politician

Sir Robert Harley FRS (6 April 1626 – 6 November 1673) was an English politician who sat in the House of Commons from 1647 to 1648 and in 1660.

== Early life and family ==
Harley was the son of Sir Robert Harley and his third wife Brilliana, the daughter of Edward Conway, 1st Viscount Conway. He was educated privately under Mr Simons.

During the English Civil War, he served in the Parliamentary Army from 1643 to 1647.

He was appointed Steward of the King's Manors or lordship of Cantref Moelynaidd, and of the boroughs of Knighton and Presteign, Radnorshire.

Harley married Edith Hinton, widow of Thomas Hinton of Hayton, Shropshire and daughter of Thomas Pembrugge of Wellington. He was the brother of Sir Edward Harley.

== Political career ==
In 1647, Harley was elected Member of Parliament for Radnor in the Long Parliament. He was excluded under Pride's Purge in 1648 and imprisoned by the Army as Major Robert Harley on 6 December 1648.

In 1660, Harley was elected MP for Radnor in the Convention Parliament.

He was re-appointed to his stewardship of the King's Manors in 1660, remaining in post until his death.

== Later life ==
In December 1661, he raised a regiment at Dunkirk, which was sent to Tangier and incorporated into the Tangier Regiment. Harley was knighted in the 1660s. He was elected Fellow of the Royal Society in August 1661. From 1663 to 1664 he was Keeper of the Seals of Barbados and from 1670 to 1671 he was receiver of fee-farm rents for Herefordshire, Worcestershire and Staffordshire.

Harley died at the age of 47 and was buried at Brampton Bryan.

Parliament of England
Preceded by Philip Warwick	Member of Parliament for Radnor; 1647–1648	Succeeded by Not represented in Rump Parliament
