= Bandbox Plot =

1712 assassination attempt in England

The Bandbox Plot of 4 November 1712, was an attempt on the life of Robert Harley, Earl of Oxford, the British Lord Treasurer, which was foiled by the perspicacity of Jonathan Swift (author of Gulliver's Travels), who happened to be visiting the Earl of Oxford.

A bandbox was a lightweight hat-box; this particular one had been configured to fire a number of loaded and cocked pistols on opening, much as a modern-day parcel bomb might be arranged to detonate on opening. In this case, the triggers were attached to a thread; Swift, perceiving the thread, seized the package and cut the thread thus disarming the device. The attack was laid at the door of the Whig party and threw enormous popular sympathy behind Harley.

The event was widely written about in the broadsheets of the time; Swift himself wrote about the occurrence in his A Journal to Stella.

== See also ==
- Early-18th-century Whig plots
