= Robert Harley, 1st Earl of Oxford and Earl Mortimer =

British statesman (1661–1724)

The Right Honourable The Earl of Oxford and Earl Mortimer KG PC FRS
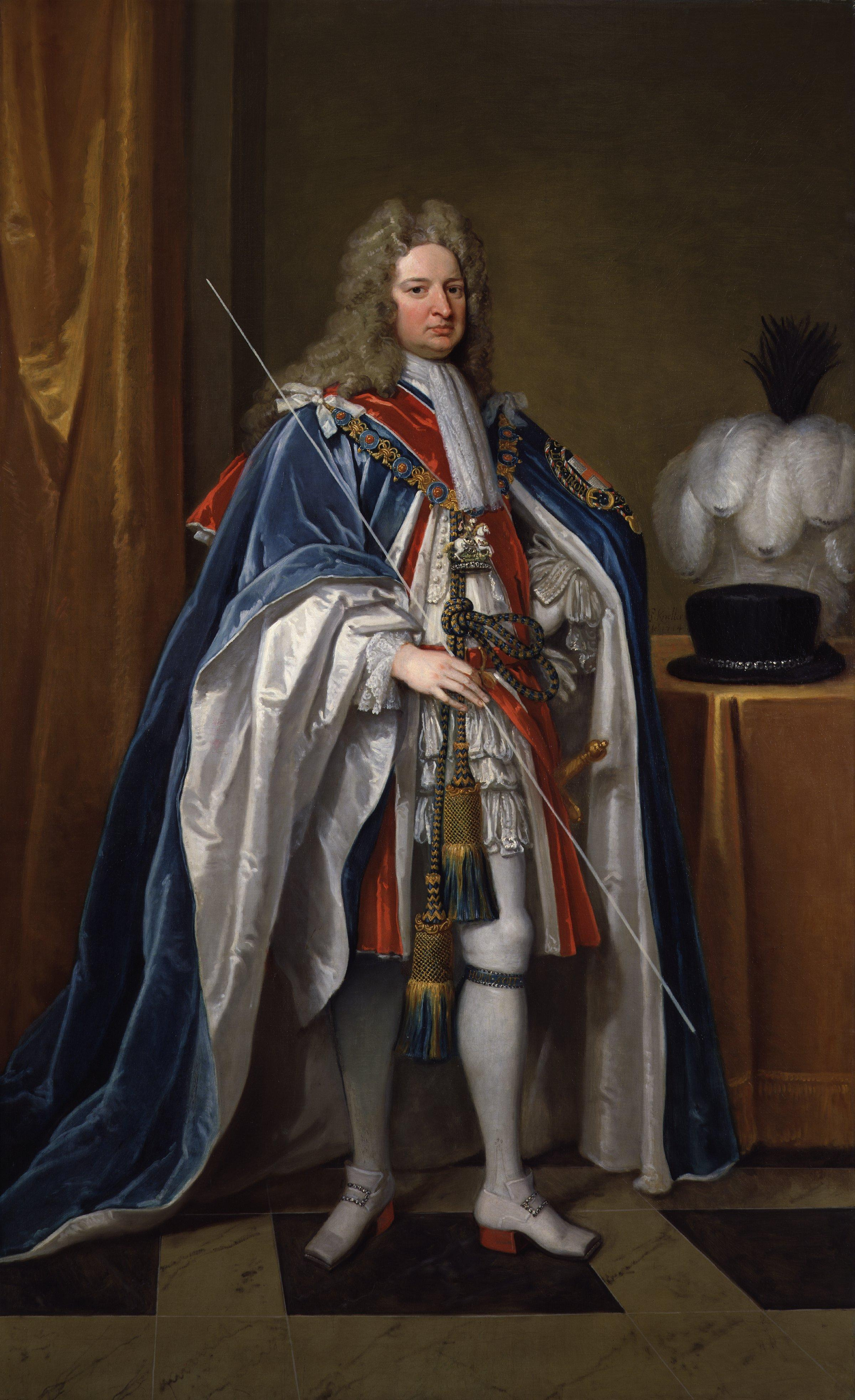
- Portrait by Godfrey Kneller, 1714

Chief Minister of Great Britain Lord High Treasurer
- In office 30 May 1711 – 30 July 1714
- Monarch: Anne
- Preceded by: The Earl Poulett as First Lord of the Treasury
- Succeeded by: The Duke of Shrewsbury

Chancellor of the Exchequer
- In office 11 August 1710 – 4 June 1711
- Monarch: Anne
- Preceded by: John Smith
- Succeeded by: Robert Benson

Secretary of State for the Northern Department
- In office 18 May 1704 – 13 February 1708
- Monarch: Anne
- Preceded by: Sir Charles Hedges
- Succeeded by: Henry Boyle

Speaker of the House of Commons
- In office February 1701 – 25 October 1705
- Monarchs: William III; Anne
- Preceded by: Sir Thomas Littleton
- Succeeded by: John Smith

Personal details
- Born: 5 December 1661 Covent Garden, Middlesex, Kingdom of England
- Died: 21 May 1724 (aged 62) Westminster, Middlesex, England, Kingdom of Great Britain
- Resting place: Brampton Bryan, Herefordshire
- Party: Whigs; Tories
- Spouse(s): Elizabeth Foley; Sarah Middleton
- Children: 4, including Edward
- Parent(s): Sir Edward Harley; Abigail Stephens

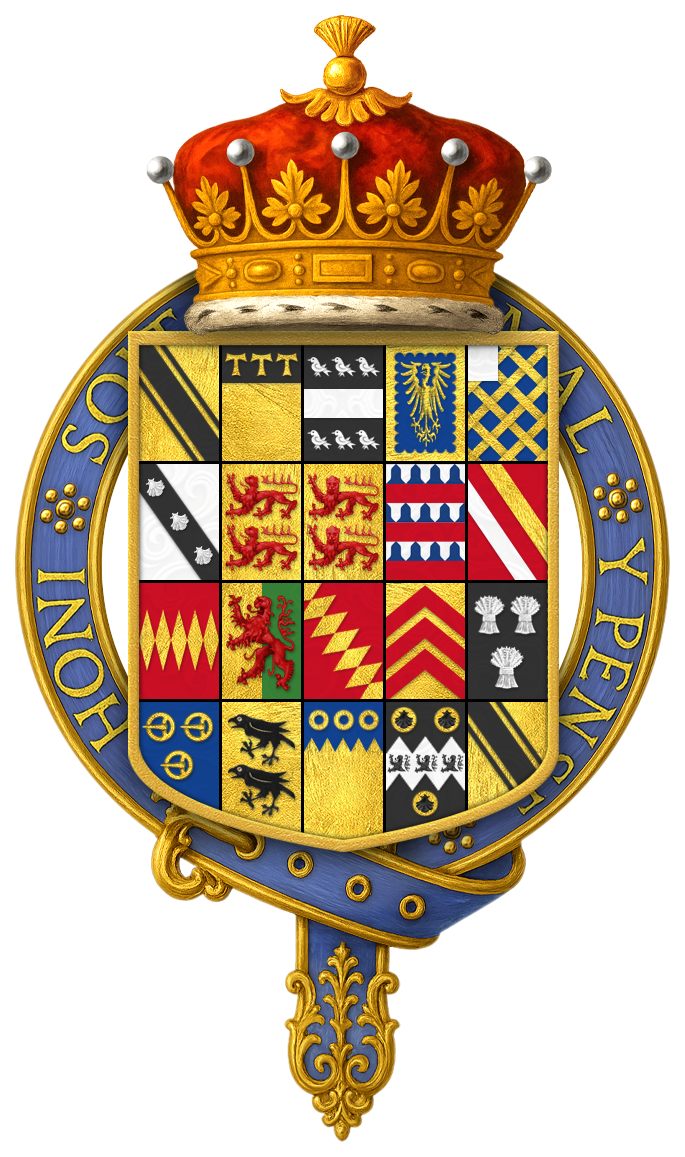
Quartered arms of Robert Harley, 1st Earl of Oxford and Earl Mortimer

Robert Harley, 1st Earl of Oxford and Earl Mortimer, KG, PC, FRS (5 December 1661 – 21 May 1724) was a British statesman of the late Stuart and early Georgian periods. He began his career as a Whig, before defecting to a new Tory ministry. He was raised to the peerage of Great Britain as an earl in 1711. Between 1711 and 1714 he served as Lord High Treasurer, effectively Queen Anne's chief minister. He has been called a prime minister, although it is generally accepted that the de facto first minister to be a prime minister was Robert Walpole in 1721.

The central achievement of Harley's government was the negotiation of the Treaty of Utrecht with France in 1713, which brought an end to twelve years of English and Scottish involvement in the War of the Spanish Succession. In 1714 Harley fell from favour following the accession of the first monarch of the House of Hanover, George I, and was for a time imprisoned in the Tower of London by his political enemies.

He was also a noted literary figure, serving as a patron of both the October Club and the Scriblerus Club. Harley Street is sometimes said to be named after him, although it was his son Edward Harley who actually developed the area.

== Early life: 1661–1688 ==
Harley was born in Bow Street, London, in 1661, the eldest son of Sir Edward Harley, a prominent landowner in Herefordshire and his wife Abigail Stephens and the grandson of Sir Robert Harley and his third wife, the celebrated letter-writer Brilliana, Lady Harley. He was educated at Shilton, near Burford, in Oxfordshire, in a small school which produced at the same time a Lord High Treasurer (Harley himself), a Lord High Chancellor (Lord Harcourt) and a Lord Chief Justice of the Common Pleas (Lord Trevor). Harley then spent some time at Foubert's Academy, but disliked it. He entered the Middle Temple on 18 March 1682, but was never called to the bar.

The principles of Whiggism and Nonconformism were taught to him at an early age, and he never formally abandoned his family's religious opinions, although he departed from them in politics.

His father was wrongly imprisoned for suspected support for the 1685 Monmouth Rebellion. Harley wrote afterwards that "we are not a little rejoiced" at Monmouth's defeat.

== Glorious Revolution: 1688–1689 ==
During 1688 Harley acted as his father's agent in promoting support for William, Prince of Orange and the Protestant cause against the policies of James II. When William landed in England on 5 November, Sir Edward Harley and his son immediately raised a troop of horse in support of the cause of William III, and took possession of the city of Worcester on his behalf. Harley was sent to report to William, meeting him at Henley. Harley obtained a commission as a major of militia foot in Herefordshire, which he held for several years.

== Backbench member of parliament: 1689–1701 ==
This recommended Robert Harley to the notice of the Boscawen family, and led to his election, in April 1689, as the parliamentary representative of Tregony, a borough under their control, whilst at the same time acting as High Sheriff of Herefordshire. He sat for Tregony for one parliament, after which, in 1690, he was elected by the constituency of New Radnor, which he represented until his elevation to the peerage in 1711. From an early age, Harley paid particular attention to the conduct of public business, taking special care over the study of the forms and ceremonies of the House of Commons.

Harley supported the Toleration Bill during its passage through the Commons and he hoped for "an equal settlement of religion" to be achieved by the inclusion of Presbyterians in the Church of England. However, this was not adopted. He also helped to defeat a Tory amendment to the Bill of Rights that would have enabled James II's son James Francis Edward Stuart to inherit the crown if he converted to Protestantism. On 14 May, Harley delivered his maiden speech in which he reminded the House of recent Tory persecutions (such as the harsh punishment of Monmouth's followers) and said that this injustice must be remedied.

After a series of French victories in Flanders during the early years of the Nine Years' War, Harley believed that the subordination of English soldiers to Dutch officers was the cause of the heavy English casualties. He, therefore, proposed a motion that future appointments of English foot regiments should be manned by Englishmen, which the House passed on 23 November 1692. He also opposed Lord Somers' proposed Abjuration Bill. If passed, this would have compelled office-holders to take an oath against recognising James II as the lawful king upon penalty of dismissal and imprisonment on the first refusal, with the penalties of high treason upon the second refusal.

During the early 1690s, Harley became a leader, second only to Paul Foley, of the 'Old Whigs' who were willing to cooperate with Tories in pursuing 'Country Party' measures against the ministerial or court Whigs in office, the so-called Whig Junto. In December 1690 he was elected to the Commission of Public Accounts to "examine, take and state" the accounts of the realm since William's accession, as expenditure had ballooned.

Harley supported a Bill to exclude from the Commons holders of government office and placemen in an effort to weaken court patronage. In taking part in the debates, Harley wrote: "I hope we have shown the parts of honest men and lovers of our country". He also supported the Triennial Bill to limit the maximum life of a Parliament to three years. In the Commons in early 1693, he claimed that long parliaments were not as representative as short-lived ones and he drew from his pocket a copy of King William's Declaration of 1688 in which he had promised frequent parliaments.

In 1696 Harley advocated the founding of a Land Bank that would serve the agricultural interest as the Bank of England served the monied interest.

After the general election of 1698, Harley emerged as the leader of the combined Country Whig-Tory opposition alliance against the Junto, or what Harley called the 'New Country Party'. Also in this year, he began his association with Sidney Godolphin, and through him ultimate entry into the circle around Princess Anne.

In November 1698 and in January 1700 Harley was approached by the ministry to accept office in the government, on the latter occasion being offered the Secretaryship of State. He refused on both occasions as he did not want to serve with the Whigs. Upon the death of Anne's only surviving child, Prince William, Duke of Gloucester, in July 1700, King William III became concerned with the succession. William believed it was imperative that the crown should go to Sophia, Electress of Hanover, or her descendants, should Anne die without child. He wrote to Harley and summoned him to an audience, where he asked Harley what demands the Commons would make in order to be persuaded to pass a Bill incorporating the new line of succession. It was agreed that the Bill would include further limitations of the monarch's power. Afterwards, William approved his election as Speaker of the House of Commons.

== Speaker of the House of Commons: 1701–1705 ==
After the general election of February 1701, he held the office of Speaker during three consecutive Parliaments until March 1705. From 18 May 1704, he combined this office with that of the Secretary of State for the Northern Department, displacing the Earl of Nottingham.

As Speaker of the first Parliament, Harley oversaw the passage of the Act of Settlement 1701, as previously agreed with King William. Harley was pleased that both the Whigs and the Tories had agreed on placing further limits on the power of the crown and he was reported to have said that "he hoped in a little time our infamous distinctions and parties, but particularly Jacobitism, should be wholly abolished and extirpated".

== Northern Secretary: 1704–1708 ==
Harley was an early practitioner of 'spin'; he recognised the political importance of careful management of the media. In 1703 Harley first made use of Daniel Defoe's talents as a political writer. This proved so successful that he was later to employ both Delarivier Manley and Jonathan Swift to pen pamphlets for him for use against his many opponents in politics.

During the time of his office, the Act of Union 1707 with Scotland was brought about. At the time of his appointment as Secretary of State, Harley had given no outward sign of dissatisfaction with the Whigs, and it was mainly through Marlborough's influence that he was admitted to the ministry.

For some time, so long indeed as the victories of the great English general cast a glamour over the policy of his friends, Harley continued to act loyally with his colleagues. But in the summer of 1707, it became evident to Sidney Godolphin, 1st Earl of Godolphin that some secret influence behind the throne was shaking the confidence of the Queen in her ministers. The sovereign had resented the intrusion into the administration of the impetuous Lord Sunderland, and had persuaded herself that the safety of the Church of England depended on the fortunes of the Tories. These convictions were strengthened in her mind by the new favourite Abigail Masham (a cousin of the Duchess of Marlborough through her mother, and of Harley on her father's side), whose coaxing contrasted favourably in the eyes of the Queen with the haughty manners of her old friend, the Duchess of Marlborough.

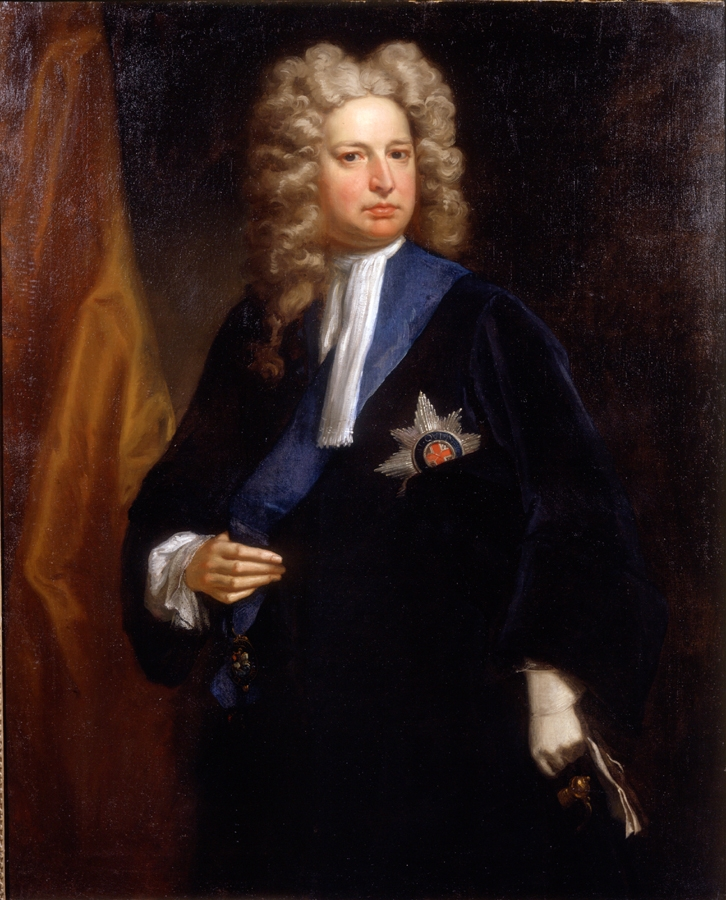
Robert Harley by Jonathan Richardson, c. 1710.

Both the Duchess and Godolphin were convinced that this change in the disposition of the queen was due to the influence of Harley and his relatives, but he was permitted to remain in office. Later, an ill-paid and poverty-stricken clerk, William Gregg, in Harley's office, was found to have given the French enemy copies of many documents which should have been kept from the knowledge of all but the most trusted advisers of the court, and it was found that through the carelessness of the head of the department the contents of such papers became the common property of all in his service. The celebrated author Daniel Defoe, then an employee of Harley's, had warned that his lax security was an invitation to treason. The Queen was informed by Godolphin and Marlborough that they would no longer serve with Harley. They did not attend her next council, on 8 February 1708, and when Harley proposed to proceed with the business of the day the Duke of Somerset drew attention to their absence. The Queen found herself forced (11 February) to accept the resignations of both Harley and Henry St John, 1st Viscount Bolingbroke.

Thomson criticizes Harley's tenure at the Northern Department, calling him "culpably negligent in the conduct of his business". In addition to citing the lax security already mentioned, Thomson writes that Harley "so arranged matters that the unhappy clerks in his office could not begin work until midnight or a little before and so were unable to leave till dawn. Even where there was nothing to do, they were kept in attendance until about three in the morning".

== Opposition: 1708–1710 ==
Harley was forced from office, but his cousin Abigail, who had recently married, continued in the Queen's service. Harley employed her influence without scruple, and not in vain. The cost of the protracted war with France, and the danger to the national church, the chief proof of which lay in the prosecution of Henry Sacheverell, were the weapons which he used to influence the masses of the people. Marlborough himself could not be displaced, but his relations were dismissed from their posts in turn. When the greatest of these, Lord Godolphin, was ejected from office on 10 August 1710, five commissioners to the treasury were appointed; among them was Harley as Chancellor of the Exchequer.

== Chancellor of the Exchequer: 1710–1711 ==
It was the aim of the new chancellor to frame an administration from the moderate members of both parties, and to adopt with but slight changes the policy of his predecessors; but his efforts were doomed to disappointment. The Whigs refused to join an alliance with him, and the Tories, who were successful beyond their wildest hopes at the polling booths, could not understand why their leaders did not adopt a policy more favourable to the interests of their party.

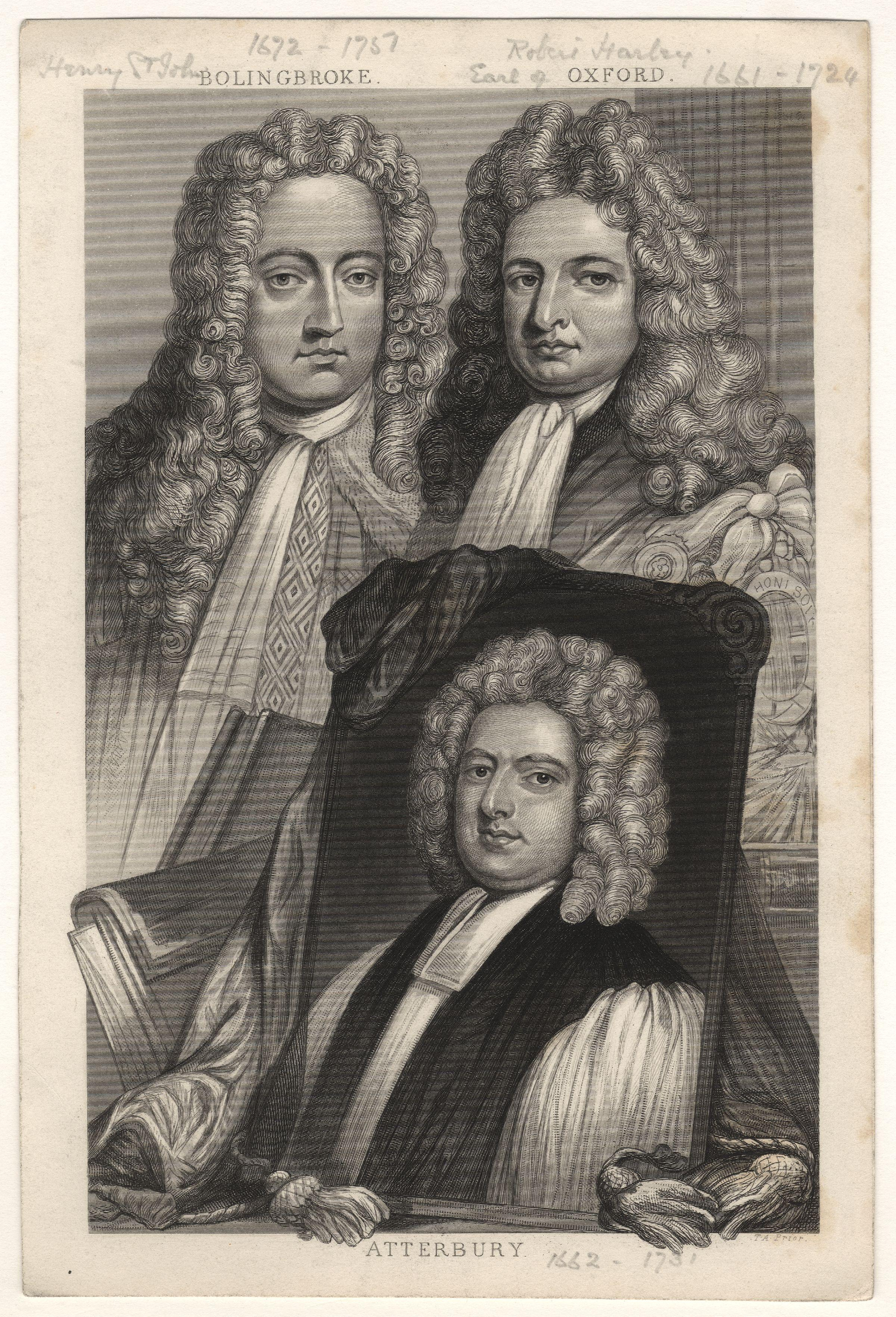
Oxford (right), together with his friend and ally Henry St John, 1st Viscount Bolingbroke and a portrait of Francis Atterbury. Engraving after a painting by Sir Godfrey Kneller.

The clamours of the wilder spirits, the country members who met at the October Club, began to be re-echoed even by those who were attached to the person of Harley, when, through an unexpected event, his popularity was restored at a bound. A French refugee, the former abbé La Bourlie (better known by the name of the Marquis de Guiscard), was being examined before the Privy Council of Great Britain on a charge of treason, when he stabbed Harley in the breast with a penknife (8 March 1711). Fortunately for Harley, he had a taste for fine clothes, and on that occasion was wearing an ornate gold brocade waistcoat: it seems that the knife stuck in one of the ornaments. Why Guiscard was allowed to enter the room carrying a weapon is still something of a mystery, but, as the Gregg affair demonstrated, Harley was notoriously lax in matters of security, and it is likely that Guiscard had not been properly searched. To a man in good health, the wounds would not have been serious, but the minister had been suffering from ill health and Swift had penned the prayer, "Pray God preserve his health, everything depends upon it". The joy of the nation on his recovery knew no bounds. Both Houses presented an address to the crown, a suitable response came from the Queen, and on Harley's reappearance in the Lower House, the Speaker made an oration which was spread by broadsheet through the country.

One of the most pressing problems at this time was the major crisis in public finance caused by the need to pay for the war against France. The architect of Great Britain's finance was Lord Halifax, and he wrote to Harley on the day that the new Treasury board met: "Your great abilities and your knowledge of the Revenue, will soon make you master of all the business, but how you will restore credit, and find money for the demands that will be upon you exceeds my capacity". Harley in 1711 created the South Sea Company to handle the national debt—it proved highly successful (at first—the notorious "bubble" began in 1720). He succeeded in restoring confidence under his tenure; whereas the Jacobite invasion scare of 1708 and the alarm caused by the Queen's illness in early 1714 both caused runs on the bank, Godolphin's fall did not precipitate one.

== Lord High Treasurer: 1711–1714 ==
On 23 May 1711 the minister became Baron Harley, of Wigmore in the County of Hereford, and Earl of Oxford and Earl Mortimer (the latter, despite its form, being a single peerage). Harley claimed the title of Oxford because of his relationship through marriage to the previous holders, the De Veres. The title of Earl Mortimer was added in case a claim was laid to the Oxford earldom. On 29 May he was appointed Lord Treasurer, and on 25 October 1712 became a Knight of the Garter.

A further attempt was made on his life in November with the Bandbox Plot, in which a hat-box, armed with loaded pistols to be triggered by a thread within the package was sent to him; the assassination attempt was forestalled by the prompt intervention of Jonathan Swift.

With the sympathy which these attempted assassinations had evoked, and with the skill which the Lord Treasurer possessed for conciliating the calmer members of either political party, he passed several months in office without any loss of reputation. He rearranged the nation's finances, and continued to support her generals in the field with ample resources for carrying on the campaign, though his emissaries were in communication with the French King, and were settling the terms of a peace independently of England's allies. After many weeks of vacillation and intrigue, when the negotiations were frequently on the point of being interrupted, the preliminary peace was signed, and in spite of the opposition of the Whig majority in the House of Lords, which was met by the creation of twelve new peers nicknamed Harley's Dozen, the much-vexed Treaty of Utrecht was brought to a conclusion on 31 March 1713. The Whig cry of "No Peace Without Spain", was not sufficient to block Parliamentary approval of the Treaty, but did lead to the defeat of the ministry's French commerce bill in June 1713.

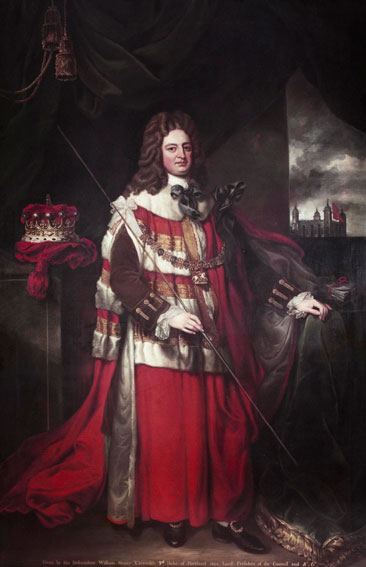
Robert Harley pictured carrying the white staff of the Lord High Treasurer. Portrait by Jonathan Richardson.

While these negotiations were under discussion, the friendship between Harley (Oxford) and St John, the latter who had become Secretary of State in September 1710, was fast changing into hatred. The latter had resented the rise in fortune which the stabs of Guiscard had secured for his colleague Harley, and when he was raised to the peerage with the title of Baron St John and Viscount Bolingbroke, instead of with an Earldom, his resentment knew no bounds. The royal favourite, Abigail, whose husband had been called to the Upper House as Baron Masham, deserted her old friend and relation for his more vivacious rival. The Jacobites found that, although the Lord Treasurer was profuse in his expressions of goodwill for their cause, no steps were taken to ensure its triumph, and they no longer placed reliance on promises which were repeatedly made and repeatedly broken. Even Harley's (Oxford's) friends began to complain of his dilatoriness, and to find some excuse for his apathy in ill health, aggravated by excess in the pleasures of the table and by the loss of his favourite child. The confidence of Queen Anne was gradually transferred from Oxford to Bolingbroke; on 27 July 1714 the former surrendered his staff as lord treasurer, and on 1 August the queen died.

== Imprisonment: 1715–1717 ==
On the accession of George I of Great Britain, the defeated minister retired to Herefordshire, but a few months later his impeachment was decided upon and he was committed to the Tower of London on 16 July 1715. He was accused of high treason and high crimes and misdemeanours, with the death penalty a distinct possibility. Many of the charges related to his negotiation of the Treaty of Utrecht. Further charges were added regarding his alleged secret plotting with the Jacobite claimant James. His political allies St John and Ormonde both fled to France before they could be arrested on similar grounds and entered the service of James. Initially, he was in ill health, suffering from pneumonia and was cared for by his wife Sarah who remained with him during the first weeks of his imprisonment.

Not long after he was detained a major Jacobite Rising occurred and was defeated. Interrogators of Jacobite prisoners tried to discover if there was a connection with Harley in the plan, but none could be established. This significantly delayed Harley's trial, as priority was given to the leading rebels, several of whom were executed. This may have benefited him as the angry mood amongst Whigs against him had calmed by 1717.

Harley also benefited from the Whig Split between rival factions led by James Stanhope and Robert Walpole. Walpole and his supporters went into opposition and joined with the Tories to attack Stanhope's government on many issues.

After an imprisonment of nearly two years, Harley was formally acquitted of the charges of high treason and high crimes and misdemeanours for which he had been impeached two years earlier, and allowed to resume his place among the peers.

== Later life: 1717–1724 ==
Immediately following his release Oxford was informed by George I that he was no longer welcome at court. He joined with the Tory lords to oppose the new Whig Oligarchy in Parliament, in alliance with the Opposition Whigs. In 1719 they joined together in opposition to Stanhope's Peerage Bill which was defeated. After this Lord Oxford increasingly took little part in public affairs, and died almost unnoticed in London on 21 May 1724.

== Literary importance ==
Harley's importance to literature cannot be overstated. As a patron of the arts, he was notable. As a preservationist, he was invaluable. He used his wealth and power to collect an unparalleled library. He commissioned the creation of ballad collections, such as The Bagford Ballads, and he purchased loose poems from all corners. He preserved Renaissance literature (particularly poetry), Anglo-Saxon literature that was then incomprehensible, and a great deal of Middle English literature. His collection, with that of his son Edward, 2nd Lord Oxford and Mortimer, was sold to Parliament in 1753 for the British Museum by the Countess of Oxford and Countess Mortimer and her daughter, the Duchess of Portland; it is known as the Harley Collection.

When he was in office, Harley promoted the careers of Jonathan Swift, Alexander Pope, and John Gay. He also wrote with them as a member of the Scriblerus Club. He, along with The 1st Viscount Bolingbroke, contributed to the literary productions of the Club. His particular talent lay in poetry, and some of his work (always unsigned) has been preserved and may be found among editions of Swift's poetry. Additionally, he likely had some hand in the writing of The Memoirs of Martinus Scriblerus, though it is impossible to tell how much.

In the opinion of the historian David C. Douglas, in Harley's time "the whole company of scholars looked up to Robert Harley, Earl of Oxford, as the great Maecenas of English medieval learning, and they were right to do so, for he was the correspondent and benefactor of very many of them, and he deserved their gratitude as surely as he earned through his book-collecting the thanks of posterity".

== Family ==
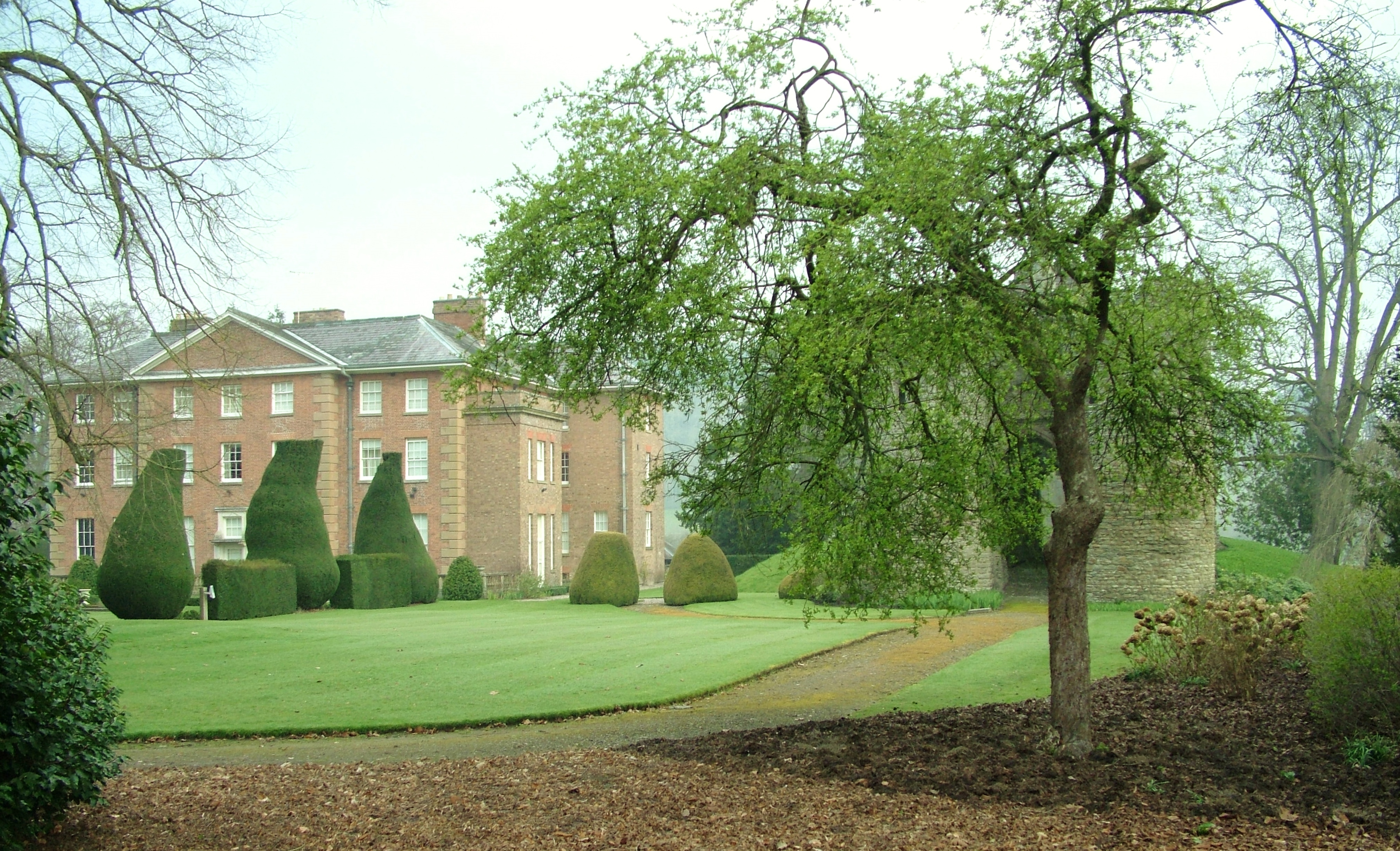
Brampton Bryan Hall

In May 1685 Harley married as his first wife Elizabeth, a daughter of Thomas Foley, and they had four children before she died in November 1691:

- Abigail (1685? - 15 July 1750), who married George Hay, later 8th Earl of Kinnoull in 1709.
- Edward (2 June 1689-16 June 1741), who married Henrietta Cavendish Holles and succeeded as 2nd Earl of Oxford and Earl Mortimer.
- Elizabeth (2 June 1689-20 November 1713), who married Peregrine Osborne, later 3rd Duke of Leeds in 1712; and
- Robert, who died in infancy in 1690.

They lived at Brampton Bryan Hall, which he inherited from his father in 1700.

After Elizabeth's death, Harley married Sarah (died 17 June 1737), daughter of Simon Middleton of Edmonton, London, on 18 September 1694. They had no children. He died in 1724 at his house in Albemarle Street, Westminster, and was buried in the churchyard of St Barnabas, Brampton Bryan, Herefordshire.

== See also ==
- Early-18th-century Whig plots

== Notes ==
Parliament of England
| Preceded by Charles Boscawen; Hugh Fortescue | Member of Parliament for Tregony; 1689–1690; With: Hugh Fortescue | Succeeded by Sir John Tremayne; Hugh Fortescue |
| Preceded by Sir Rowland Gwynne | Member of Parliament for Radnor; 1690–1707 | Succeeded by Parliament of Great Britain |
| Preceded by Sir Thomas Littleton, Bt | Speaker of the House of Commons of England; 1701–1705 | Succeeded by John Smith |
Parliament of Great Britain
| Preceded by Parliament of England | Member of Parliament for Radnor; 1707–1711 | Succeeded by Lord Harley |
Political offices
| Preceded by Sir Rowland Gwynne | Custos Rotulorum of Radnorshire; 1702–1714 | Succeeded by The Lord Coningsby |
| Preceded by Sir Charles Hedges | Northern Secretary; 1704–1708 | Succeeded by Henry Boyle |
| Preceded by John Smith | Chancellor of the Exchequer; 1710–1711 | Succeeded by Robert Benson |
| In commission First Lord: The Earl Poulett | Lord High Treasurer; 1711–1714 | Succeeded by The Duke of Shrewsbury |
Peerage of Great Britain
| New creation | Earl of Oxford and Earl Mortimer; 1711–1724 | Succeeded by Edward Harley |
