= William Gregg =

William Gregg may refer to:

- William Gregg (VC) (1890–1969), British First World War Victoria Cross recipient
- William Gregg (industrialist) (1800–1867), founder of the pioneer Graniteville, South Carolina textile mill
- William Gregg (tennis), Australian tennis player in 1907 Australasian Championships
- William Gregg (New Zealand businessman), founder of the New Zealand company Gregg's
- William Gregg (clerk and spy) (died 1708), Scottish clerk and spy
- Bill Gregg (1914–2000), Australian rules footballer
- William O. Gregg, American bishop
- William Gregg (theologian) (1817–1909), Canadian theologian and clergyman; Professor of Apologetics

== See also ==
- William Greg (1809-1881), English essayist
- William Greig (disambiguation)
