= Brilliana =

Brilliana is a feminine given name. This name was first used by Brilliana Conway (or as known as Brilliana Harley). Her name was coined by her father, Sir Edward Conway, after Brielle (called as Brill in English) in Holland with the suffix -ian as a demonym and the Latin feminine suffix -a.

== People ==
- Ethel Brilliana Tweedie (1862–1940), English author
- Brilliana Harley (1598–1643), English writer
