= Edward Harley (Parliamentarian) =

English army officer and politician (1624–1700)

Sir Edward Harley KB, JP, FRS
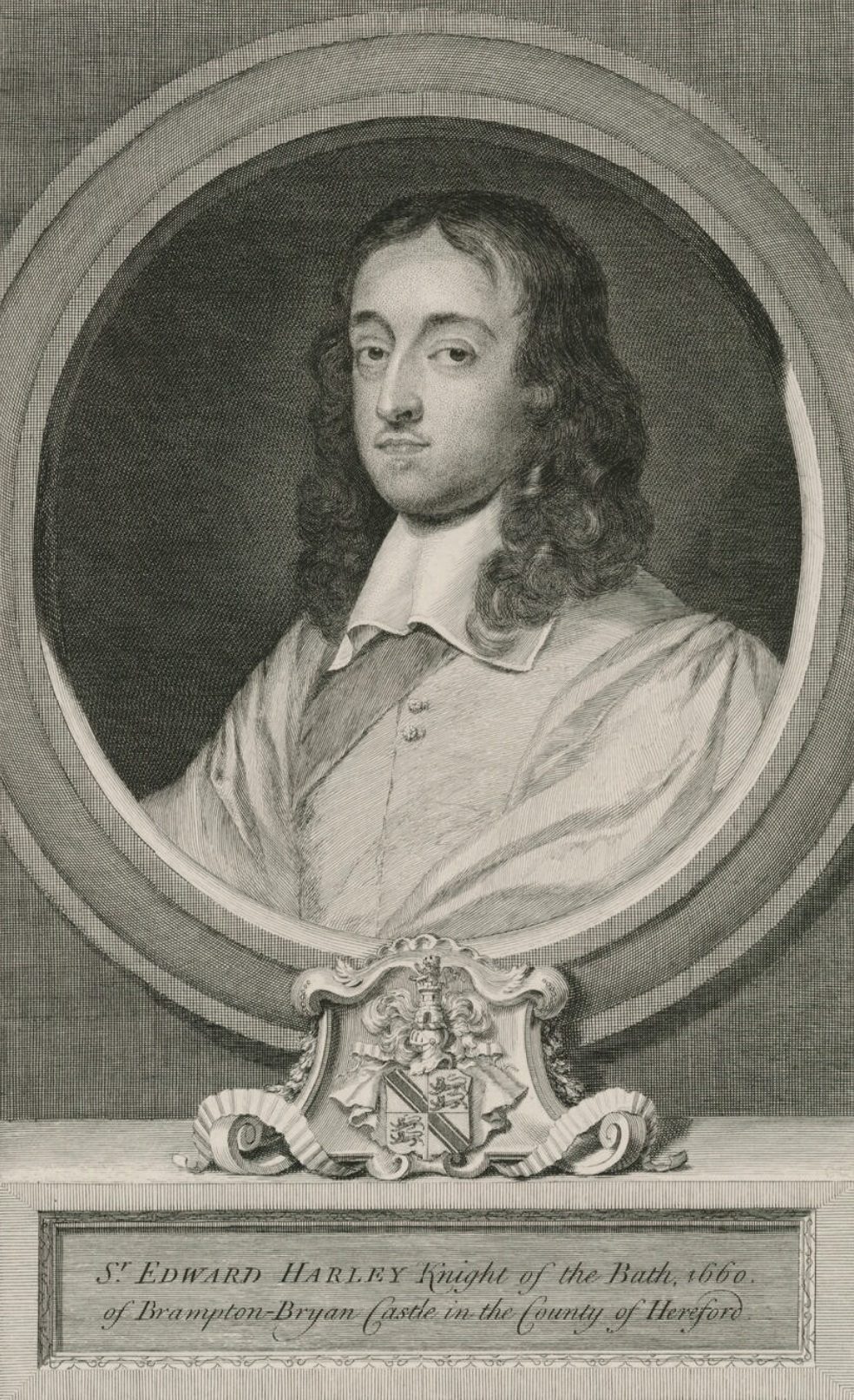
- Engraving by George Vertue after a Samuel Cooper portrait, 1749

Deputy lieutenant of Herefordshire and Radnorshire
- In office 1689–1700

Member of Parliament for Herefordshire
- In office October 1679 to April 1689 – February 1693 to September 1695

Member of Parliament for New Radnor Boroughs
- In office April 1661 – May 1679

Deputy lieutenant of Herefordshire
- In office August 1660 – 1682

Governor of Dunkirk
- In office May 1660 – May 1661

Custos Rotulorum of Radnorshire
- In office 1660–1682

Member of Parliament for Herefordshire
- In office November 1646 – May 1660 (Note: Excluded by Pride's Purge in December 1648, elected to the Second Protectorate Parliament in 1656, but not permitted to sit, re-admitted with the rest of the Long Parliament in April 1660)

Parliamentarian Governor of Canon Frome
- In office August 1645 – November 1646

Personal details
- Born: 21 October 1624 Brampton Bryan, Herefordshire
- Died: 8 December 1700 (aged 76) Brampton Bryan
- Resting place: St Barnabas church, Brampton Bryan
- Spouse(s): (1) Mary Button (1654-1660) her death; (2) Abigail Stephens (1661)
- Children: (1) Four daughters (2) Robert, Earl of Oxford (1661-1724); Edward Harley (1664–1735); Abigail (1664-1726); Nathaniel (1665-1720)
- Education: Magdalen Hall, Oxford; Lincoln's Inn

Military service
- Rank: Colonel
- Battles/wars: First English Civil War; Lansdowne; Siege of Gloucester; Roundway Down; Skirmish near Redmarley (WIA); Capture and loss of Monmouth; Battle of Ledbury; Glorious Revolution

Sir Edward Harley (21 October 1624 – 8 December 1700) was an English politician from Herefordshire. A devout Puritan who fought for Parliament in the First English Civil War, Harley belonged to the moderate Presbyterian faction, which opposed the involvement of the New Model Army in the peace negotiations that followed victory in 1646. Elected MP for Herefordshire in 1646, he was one of the Eleven Members forced into temporary exile by the army in 1647.

Harley's refusal to support the Trial of Charles I led to his exclusion from the Long Parliament by Pride's Purge in December 1648, while his opposition to the king's execution in January 1649 meant he played little part in public affairs under the Commonwealth. After the Stuart Restoration in May 1660, he was appointed Deputy lieutenant of Herefordshire, and Governor of Dunkirk, which was occupied by England from 1658 to 1661.

However, his strong Presbyterian beliefs meant Harley was never entirely accepted by the new regime, which combined with his preference for local politics meant this was the last significant post he held. Elected MP for New Radnor Boroughs in 1661, he retained this seat until 1679 when he switched back to Herefordshire. During the 1679 to 1681 Exclusion Crisis, he was a prominent advocate of removing the Catholic heir James II from the succession. In the Tory reaction that followed, he lost his local offices and was briefly imprisoned during the 1685 Monmouth Rebellion.

In November 1688, he raised a troop of cavalry to fight for William of Orange, and regained his positions after the Glorious Revolution. He continued to attend Parliament where he supported the Whigs, but relinquished his seat in 1695, and died at Brampton Bryan Hall on 8 December 1700. His eldest son Robert, Earl of Oxford (1661-1724), served as Lord High Treasurer in the 1711 to 1713 Tory government.

== Personal details ==
Edward Harley was born 21 October 1624 in Brampton Bryan Castle, Herefordshire, eldest surviving child of Sir Robert Harley (1579-1656), and his third wife Brilliana, Lady Harley (1598 -1643). He was one of seven children from this marriage, having two brothers and four sisters.

In 1654, Harley married Mary Button; they had four daughters, Brilliana, Martha, and two named Mary, both of whom died young. Abigail Stephens (died 1688) became his second wife in 1661, and they had four surviving children; Robert (1661-1724), who became Lord High Treasurer in 1711, Edward Harley (1664–1735), Abigail (1664-1726), and Nathaniel (1665-1720).

== First English Civil War ==
The Harleys were one of the most powerful families in Herefordshire, while both Sir Robert and Lady Brilliana were Presbyterians who used their influence to appoint Nonconformist clergy to local positions. With this background, after leaving Shrewsbury School in 1638, Harley entered Magdalen Hall, Oxford, then a centre of Puritan education. (Note: Puritan was a general term for those who wanted to "purify" the Church of England, and covered many different shades of belief, eg Presbyterians, Congregationalists etc) He left Oxford in 1640 to join his father in London, and attended Lincoln's Inn from 1641 to 1642.

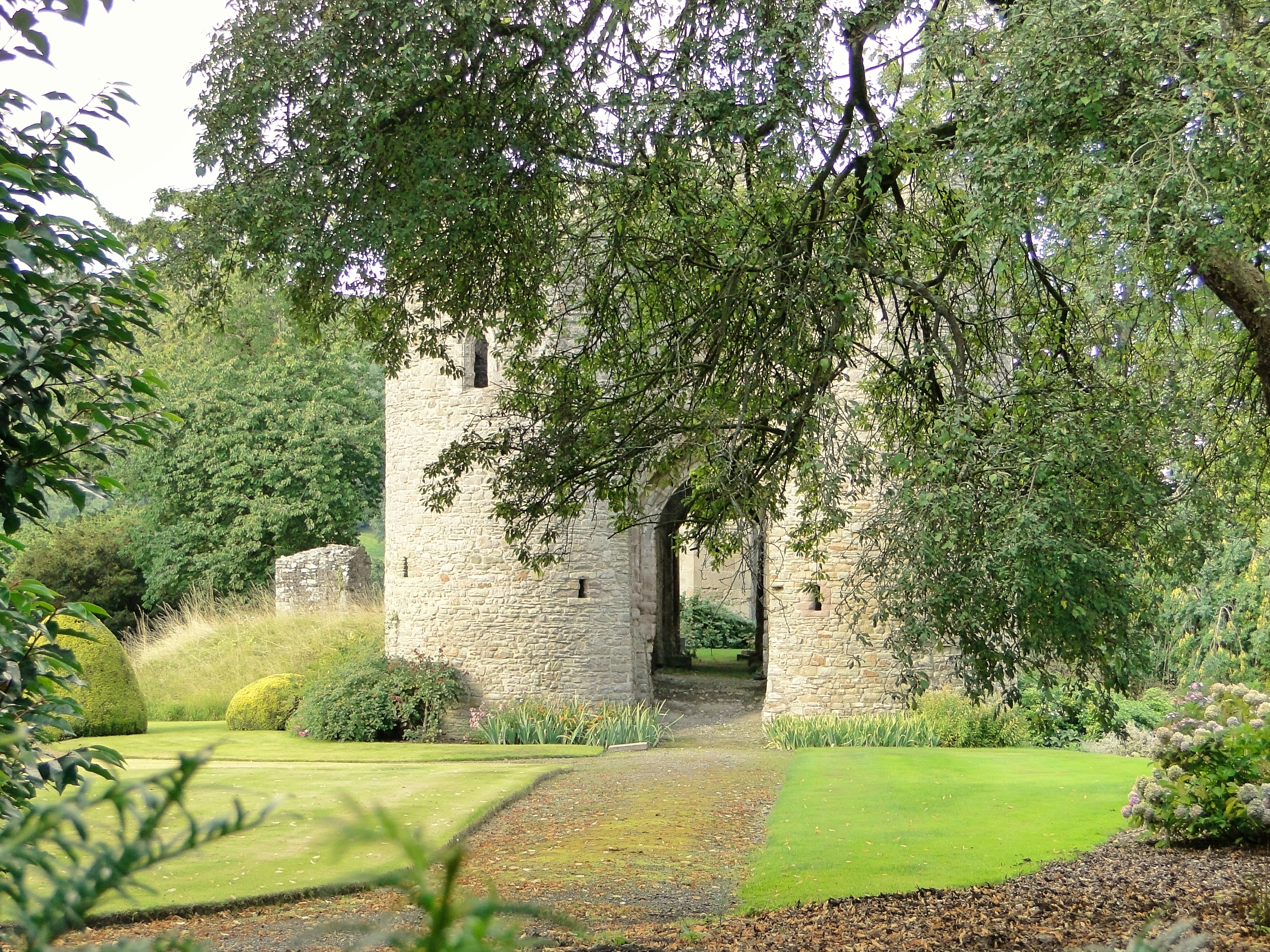
The remains of Brampton Bryan Castle, almost totally destroyed during the war

When the First English Civil War began in August 1642, the Harleys were among the minority of Herefordshire landed gentry who supported Parliament, and the county became a major source of Royalist recruits. By 1643, Parliamentarian forces controlled only a few strongholds in the area, including Brampton Bryan castle, where the garrison was commanded by Lady Brilliana. The local headquarters was Gloucester, held throughout the conflict by Edward Massey.

During William Waller's 1643 campaign in South West England, Harley served as captain of a troop of cavalry at Lansdowne and Roundway Down in July. Two Parliamentarian defeats that cemented Royalist control of the region, he later attributed these setbacks to divine punishment for over confidence. However, an attack on Gloucester itself was successfully repulsed, and in August Harley was made colonel of a new infantry regiment raised as part of Massey's Army of the Western Association.

Lady Brilliana died of pneumonia in October 1643, while Brampton Bryan castle was sacked and burned a few months later. During a Royalist attempt to tighten their blockade of Gloucester in August 1644, Harley was wounded in a skirmish outside Redmarley D'Abitot, a village near Ledbury. This was repulsed, and with Prince Rupert taking many Royalist troops north for the Marston Moor campaign, Parliamentarian forces were able to capture Monmouth in September. Harley was appointed Governor, before dissension among the garrison and hostility from the locals allowed the Royalists to retake the town in November.

Key locations mentioned in article

When the New Model Army was formed in April 1645, Harley was given command of one of its twelve authorised infantry regiments; the previous colonel, Harry Barclay, and his deputy John Innes, were Scottish professional soldiers who resigned under orders from the Covenanter government. His appointment appears to have been a political decision, since many officers proposed by Oliver Cromwell and Sir Thomas Fairfax were religious Independents or political radicals. Their commissions had to be approved by Parliament, whose moderate Presbyterian majority viewed them with considerable unease.

Parliament presumably hoped Harley would counterbalance some of his radical officers, which included Lieutenant Colonel Thomas Pride, leader of Pride's Purge in December 1648, and future regicide Captain William Goffe. In reality, command was generally exercised by Pride, since Harley spent very little time with the regiment. He missed Naseby after being wounded in another skirmish outside Ledbury in April 1645, and was appointed Governor of Canon Frome in August, which meant he did not participate in the New Model's Western Campaign. Regional forces like Massey's Western Association continued to exist independently of the New Model, and in January 1646 Harley was appointed Commander of Horse for Herefordshire and Radnorshire. He was also one of the delegates who negotiated the surrender of Oxford, the Royalist war-time capital whose capitulation in June 1646 effectively ended the war.

However, victory resulted in increasingly bitter disputes over the post-war political settlement between radicals within the New Model like Oliver Cromwell, and Parliamentary moderates, the most prominent being Denzil Holles. At the same time, Parliament's desperate economic position made reducing the number of men under arms a matter of urgency. Seeking to ensure his own troops were retained and to re-assert his position in local politics, Harley became involved in a power struggle with the other prominent Parliamentarian in the region, Colonel John Birch, Governor of Hereford.

In September 1646, Harley supported a proposal to dissolve those forces commanded by Birch, whom he then defeated in a By-election for Herefordshire. Although the Self-denying Ordinance required MPs to resign their military positions, Harley retained his commission in the New Model. However, once in Parliament he sided with those who feared and resented the growing political influence of the military, and became one of its most significant opponents. Along with Holles, Waller and Massey, in June 1647 he was among the Eleven Members the army demanded be removed from Parliament. The MPs complied, allegedly "to avoid bloodshed".

== Pride's Purge and the Interregnum ==
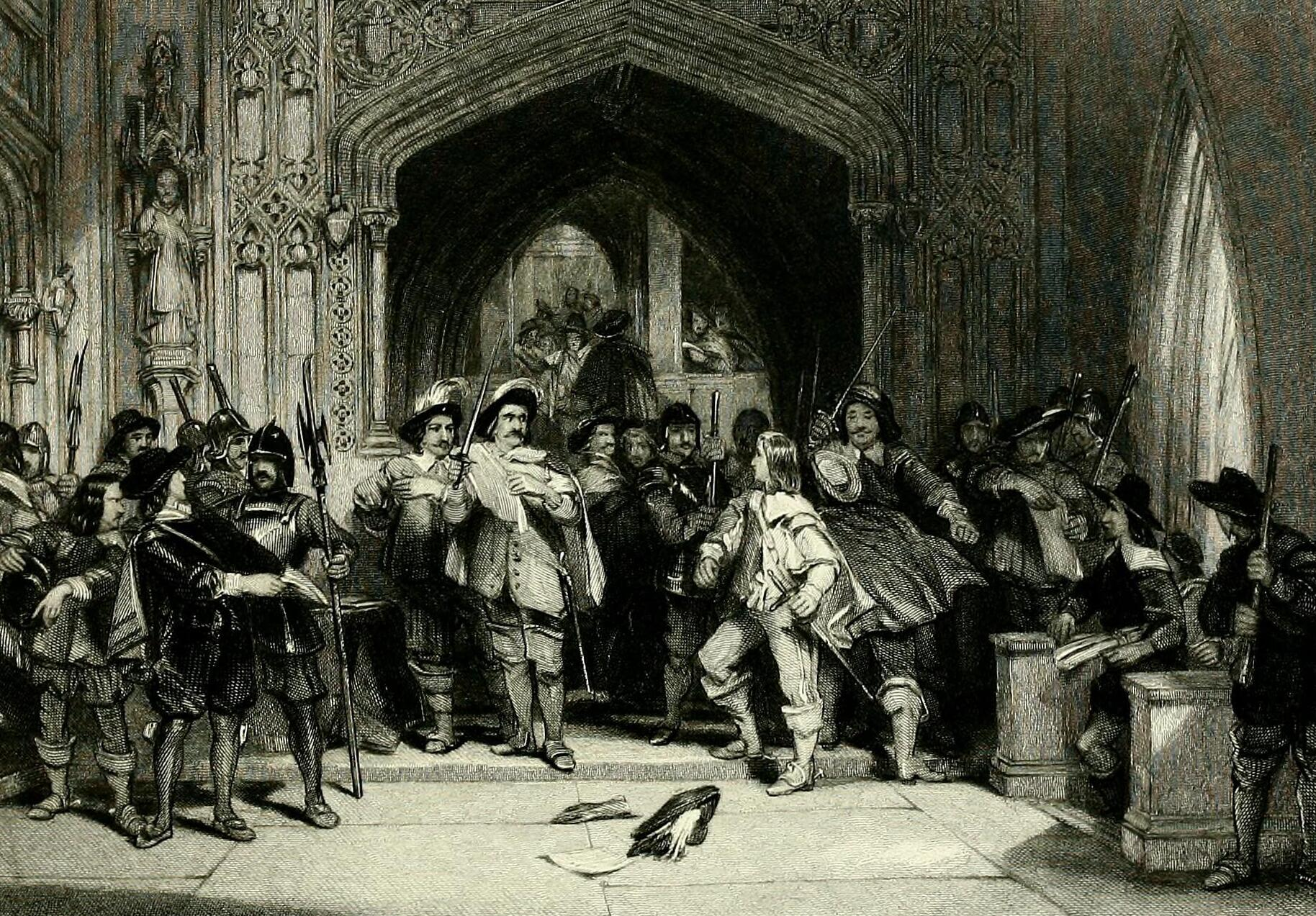
Pride's Purge, December 1648; Harley, his father and younger brother Robert were among the MPs excluded by his former deputy

Harley took no part in the Second English Civil War, and formally resigned his commission in August 1648, before resuming his seat in Parliament. Along with his father and younger brother Robert, he opposed the Trial of Charles I and was one of the MPs excluded by Pride's Purge in December 1648. During the Interregnum that followed the Execution of Charles I in January 1649, he was arrested several times, although he avoided involvement in Royalist agitation, unlike Robert.

The continuing influence of the Harley family in local politics was demonstrated in September 1656 when Edward was returned as MP for Herefordshire in the Second Protectorate Parliament, despite a concerted effort by The Protectorate authorities to prevent it. However, he was promptly barred from Parliament by Cromwell for challenging his appointment as Lord Protector. His father died in December and Harley inherited his estates; these had been badly damaged by the war, and he spent the new few years restoring them.

== The Restoration and after ==
Harley returned to the Commons when the Long Parliament was re-installed in February 1660, and in April was re-elected for Herefordshire in the Convention Parliament. After the Stuart Restoration in May, Charles II made him Deputy lieutenant of Herefordshire, Custos Rotulorum of Radnorshire, and Governor of Dunkirk. Occupied by England since 1658, Harley was committed to the town's retention, (Note: As well as providing an entry point for European intervention, many English politicians wanted to retain Dunkirk largely due to its unique position. Ships based there could reach the North Sea on a single flood tide, making it a privateer base for centuries, and is why it proved so useful as an evacuation point in 1940) but was removed as Governor in 1661, shortly before Charles sold it to France in October 1662.

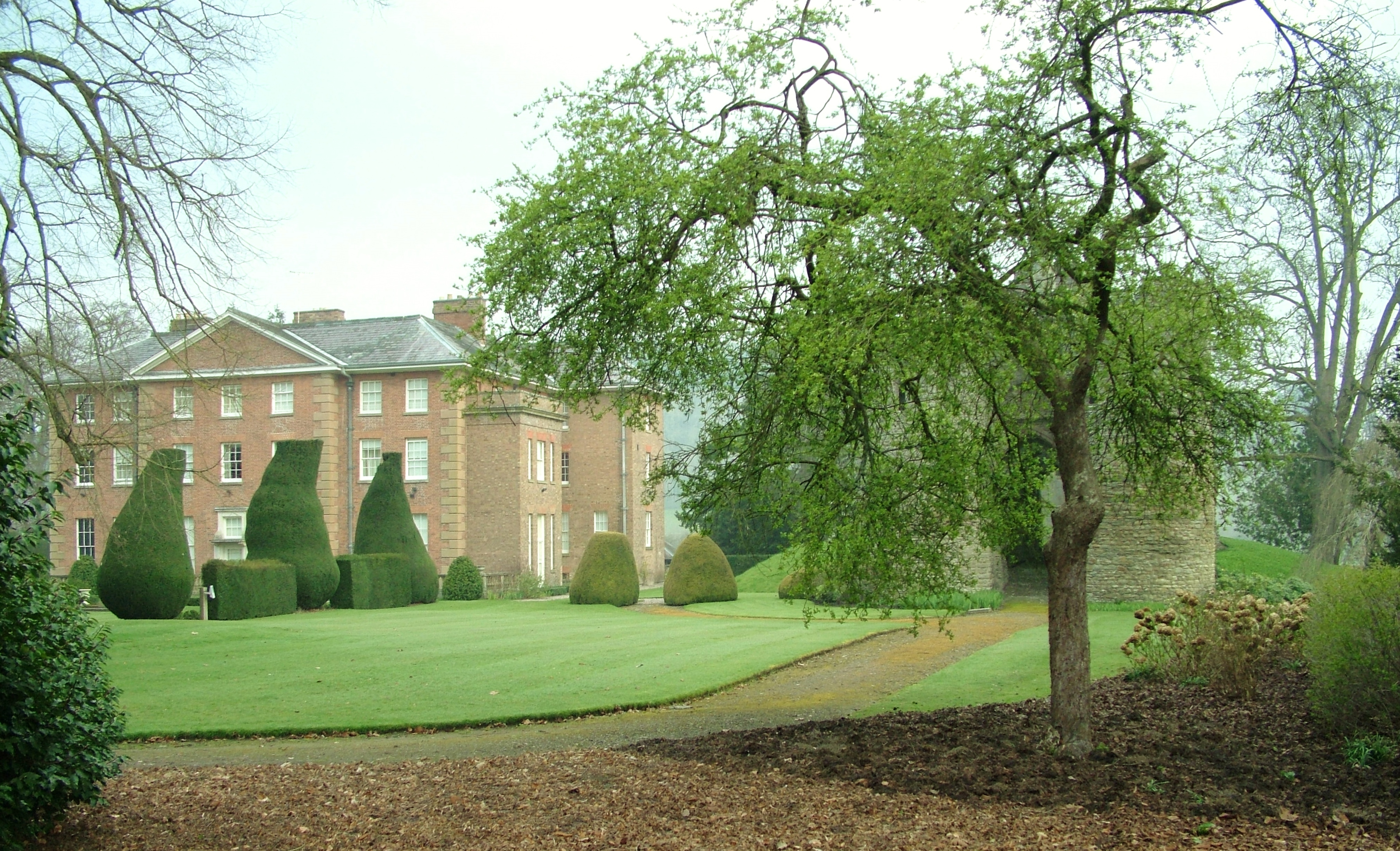
Brampton Bryan Hall, built by Harley after the Stuart Restoration to replace Brampton Bryan Castle

Harley reportedly refused a peerage but accepted a knighthood so he could continue to sit in the Commons. In 1661, he was elected to the Cavalier Parliament as MP for New Radnor Boroughs, a seat he retained until 1679. He remained a member of the Church of England despite opposing the Act of Uniformity 1662 and penal laws imposed on Presbyterians and other Nonconformists. Like other moderates he hoped these acts would eventually be amended, allowing dissidents to return to the church.

Described by one opponent as a "Presbyterian rogue", Harley's religious opinions and hostility to Catholicism meant he was mistrusted by many of those around Charles II. These views brought him close to Shaftesbury, who led the movement to exclude the Catholic heir, James II, from the succession. In the elections of October 1679 and March 1681, he resumed his seat as MP for Herefordshire. However, Shaftesbury's efforts failed; Charles suspended Parliament for the rest of his reign, and in the Tory reaction that followed, Harley was deprived of all his offices.

He retained considerable influence in Herefordshire, and despite being arrested during the unsuccessful Monmouth Rebellion in June 1685, James II made several efforts to attract his backing, all of which he refused. In November 1688, Harley raised a troop of horse to support the Glorious Revolution; restored to his office as Deputy lieutenant of Herefordshire and Radnorshire, in April 1689 he was elected for Herefordshire, then defeated in 1690. He returned to Parliament in February 1693 as a Country Whig, often voting with the Tories; his opposition to the government was largely due to concerns over the expansion of the standing army for the Nine Years War. (Note: It is difficult to overstate the hostility to permanent forces caused by the experience of military rule under the New Model Army. Many saw them as a symptom of "arbitrary government", and James II's expansion of the Royal Army post 1685 was a major factor in losing him popular support) He resigned his seat in 1695 and died at home in Brampton Bryan on 8 December 1700.

== Sources ==
- Atherton, Ian (2013). "An Account of Herefordshire in the First Civil War". Midland History. 21 (1): 136–155. doi:10.1179/mdh.1996.21.1.136.
- Bromley, JS (1987). Corsairs and Navies, 1600-1760. Continnuum-3PL. ISBN 978-0907628774.
- Childs, John (1987). The British Army of William III, 1689-1702 (1990 ed.). Manchester University Press. ISBN 978-0719025525.
- Eales, Jacqueline (2004). "Harley, Sir Robert (1579–1656)". Oxford Dictionary of National Biography (online ed.). Oxford University Press. doi:10.1093/ref:odnb/12343. (Subscription, Wikipedia Library access or UK public library membership required.)
- Gentles, Ian (2002). Kenyon, John; Ohlmeyer, Jane (eds.). The Civil Wars in England in The Civil Wars; a Military History of England, Scotland and Ireland 1638-1660. OUP. ISBN 978-0192802781.
- Goodwin, Gordon (2004). "Harley, Sir Edward (1624–1700)". Oxford Dictionary of National Biography (online ed.). Oxford University Press. doi:10.1093/ref:odnb/12335. (Subscription, Wikipedia Library access or UK public library membership required.)
- Helms, M.W; Rowlands, Edward (1983). "Harley, Edward (1624-1700), of Brampton Bryan, Herefs". The History of Parliament: the House of Commons 1660–1690. Boydell and Brewer. ISBN 978-1107002258.
- Helms, M.W; Ferris, John P (1983). "HARLEY, Robert I (1626-73), of Walford, Herefs". The History of Parliament: the House of Commons 1660–1690. Boydell and Brewer. ISBN 978-1107002258.
- Hutton, Ronald (2002). The Royalist War Effort 1642-1646 (2003 ed.). Routledge. ISBN 978-0415305402.
- Jackson, Clare (2021). Devil-Land: England Under Siege, 1588-1688. Penguin UK. ISBN 978-0-14-198458-2.
- Jenkins, R.T (1959). HARLEY family, of Brampton Bryan and Wigmore, Herefordshire, later earls of Oxford and Mortimer; in Dictionary of Welsh Biography.
- Key, Newton (2004). "Birch, John (1615–1691)". Oxford Dictionary of National Biography (online ed.). Oxford University Press. doi:10.1093/ref:odnb/2429. (Subscription, Wikipedia Library access or UK public library membership required.)
- Miller, John (1978). James II; A study in kingship. Menthuen. ISBN 978-0413652904.
- Royle, Trevor (2004). Civil War: the Wars of the Three Kingdoms 1638-1660 (2006 ed.). Abacus. ISBN 978-0349115641.
- Uglow, Jenny (2009). A Gambling Man: Charles II and the Restoration. Faber and Faber. ISBN 978-0571217335.
- Wanklyn, Malcolm (2014). "Choosing Officers for the New Model Army February to April 1645". Journal of the Society for Army Historical Research. 92 (370): 109–125. JSTOR 44232556.
- Wanklyn, Malcolm (2015). Reconstructing the New Model Army Volume I; Regimental Lists April 1645 to May 1649. Helion and Company. ISBN 978-1910777107.
- Warmington, Gordon (2004). "Massey [Massie], Sir Edward (1604x9–1674)". Oxford Dictionary of National Biography (online ed.). Oxford University Press. doi:10.1093/ref:odnb/18297. (Subscription, Wikipedia Library access or UK public library membership required.)

Parliament of England
Preceded by Humphry Coningsby until 1644; Sir Robert Harley	Member of Parliament for Herefordshire c. 1646 – Dec. 1648 but excluded Jan. 1647 – June 1648; With: Sir Robert Harley	Vacant
Preceded by John Scudamore; John Pateshal; John Flacket; Richard Read	Member of Parliament for Herefordshire; 1654–1656; With: James Berry; Bennet Hoskyns; Benjamin Mason	not represented
Preceded by Robert Harley	Member of Parliament for New Radnor Boroughs; 1661–1679	Succeeded by Griffith Jones
Preceded by The Viscount Scudamore; Sir Herbert Croft, Bt	Member of Parliament for Herefordshire; 1679–1685; With: Sir Herbert Croft, Bt	Succeeded by Sir John Morgan, Bt; Sir John Hoskyns, Bt
Preceded by Sir John Morgan, Bt; Sir John Hoskyns, Bt	Member of Parliament for Herefordshire; 1689–1690; With: Sir John Morgan	Succeeded by Sir John Morgan, Bt; Sir Herbert Croft, Bt
Preceded by Sir John Morgan, Bt; Sir Herbert Croft, Bt	Member of Parliament for Herefordshire; 1693–1698; With: Sir Herbert Croft, Bt	Succeeded by Henry Cornewall; Henry Gorges
Honorary titles
Interregnum	Deputy lieutenant of Herefordshire; 1660–1682	Succeeded by Marquess of Worcester
Interregnum	Custos Rotulorum of Radnorshire; 1660–1685	Succeeded by Marquess of Worcester
