= Brampton Bryan Castle =

Grade I listed castle in England

- Brampton Bryan, Herefordshire, England
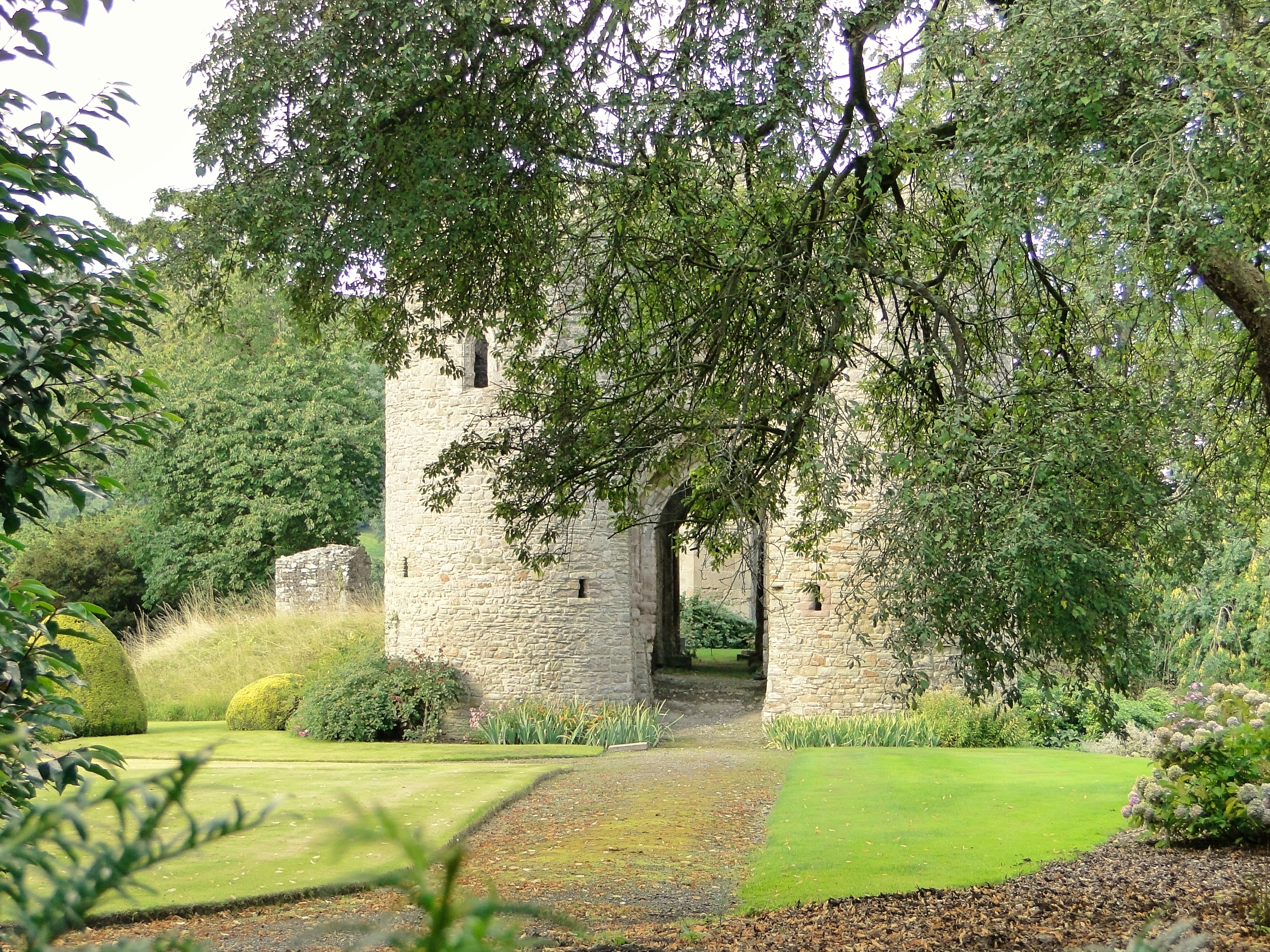
- Gatehouse to the castle

Location
- Coordinates: 52.3478°N 2.9263°W
- Grid reference: grid reference SO370726

Site history
- Events: English Civil War

Brampton Bryan Castle is a ruined medieval castle in the village of Brampton Bryan in north-western Herefordshire, England, 50m south of the River Teme. The castle guarded an important route from Ludlow along the Teme Valley to Knighton and on into Central Wales.

== Site ==
The standing remains are a Grade I listed building consisting of local sandstone rubble and ashlar that represent several phases of construction. The standing remains consist of an outer gate house and parts of the inner gatehouse and part of the south wall of the kitchen range and the great hall. The site also contains the buried remains of a quadrangular castle.

The earliest documentary evidence of the site mentions a "tower with curtilage" on the site in 1295. At its height and after several phases of development the medieval layout appears to have sat on a motte and was surrounded by a moat. Access was via a bridge from the south which led into a gatehouse in the southern curtain wall. This was a large building consisting of an inner gatehouse to which a larger outer gatehouse, which projected out from the curtain wall, was added at a later date. The passage through the gatehouse led into a square courtyard which was surrounded by ranges of buildings that abutted the curtain walls. The great hall was located on the first floor of the northern range, with the kitchens to the east. The other ranges consisted of private accommodation and ancillary buildings such as stables.

The castle ruins are built out of local sandstone rubble and ashlar, and are listed as Grade I. These ruins represent several phases of construction, and include the outer gatehouse, part of the inner gatehouse and part of the south wall of the hall and kitchen range. Landscaping for the later house and gardens have obscured the full extent of the castle buildings but it is thought that the steep slope to the north of the hall range wall represents the northern edge of the original motte.

== Medieval period ==
The demesne is mentioned in the Domesday Book (1086) although the actual date of its foundation remains uncertain. The earliest reference to a building on the site is a "tower with curtilage' in 1295. During the previous year the owner Bryan de Brampton had died and Robert Harley inherited the castle through marriage to his daughter Margaret. For almost 700 years since the castle has remained in the Harley family. It was severely damaged in 1642 during the Civil War.

== Civil War ==
The castle was almost entirely destroyed during the English Civil War. Robert Harley (died 1656) was a Puritan and served as a Member of Parliament. Situated in a predominantly Royalist county, the estate and castle were vulnerable to attack. Robert Harley left the defence of the castle in the hands of his wife, Brilliana. Brilliana was the daughter of Sir Edward and Dorothy Conway, of Ragley in Warwickshire, and became Robert Harley's third wife in March 1624.

In July 1643, eleven months after King Charles I raised his Royal Standard in Nottingham, the castle came under attack. (Note: King Charles I raised the Royal Standard in Nottingham on 22 August 1642.) Before this, Fitzwilliam Coningsby, the Royalist High Sheriff of Herefordshire, had restricted himself to ordering the Harley tenants to pay their rents directly to him and those that refused were sent to jail. Subsequently, attacks were made on the property and livestock stolen. The Harley family's support for Parliament can be seen in a number of Lady Brilliana's letters to her son, Sir Edward Harley — in December 1642, Lady Harley wrote; "They [my neighbours] are in mighty violence against me." On 26 July 1643 Sir William Vavasour, the newly appointed governor of Hereford, surrounded Brampton Bryan with a mixed force of cavalry and infantrymen of about 700 soldiers. Brilliana and three of her children together with about 50 civilians and 50 soldiers held the castle. Conditions inside rapidly deteriorated. Cattle, sheep and horses were plundered, all the buildings in the village were burnt to the ground and the castle was attacked with cannon and shot. (Note: The church, the parsonage, 40 houses and the castle mills were all burnt down (Herefordshire Archaeology department 2013).) Although the bombardment left the castle roofless, the casualties were low with only one death and a few injuries being recorded. The attackers saw nearly a tenth of their company either killed or injured. The siege was lifted on 9 September when the Royalists left to join the attack on Gloucester.

For some months afterwards an uneasy truce prevailed (although this did not stop Brilliana dispatching 40 troops to raid a Royalist camp at Knighton in Wales); however, Brilliana's health worsened and she died 29 October 1643. Following her death, the command of the garrison was put in the hands of the family doctor Nathaniel Wright and the Royalist forces began a second siege of the castle in the spring of the following year. This second siege lasted only three weeks and the Royalists, reinforced by additional weaponry, inflicted much more substantial damage upon the castle with mines and more powerful artillery. The siege ended when Dr Wright surrendered to the attacking forces led by Sir Michael Woodhouse, Sir William Vavasour and Sir William Croft. The building was sacked and burnt and the prisoners, including the three young Harley children, were taken to Shrewsbury. Despite the loss of his castle Robert Harley's support of the Roundhead cause proved to be a wise one, and following Oliver Cromwell's victory he was well rewarded — his compensation for losses suffered amounted to some £13,000 (over £1 million [2006 value]).

According to legend, every 3 September the Devil rampages through the park with Cromwell's soul.

== Brampton Bryan Hall ==
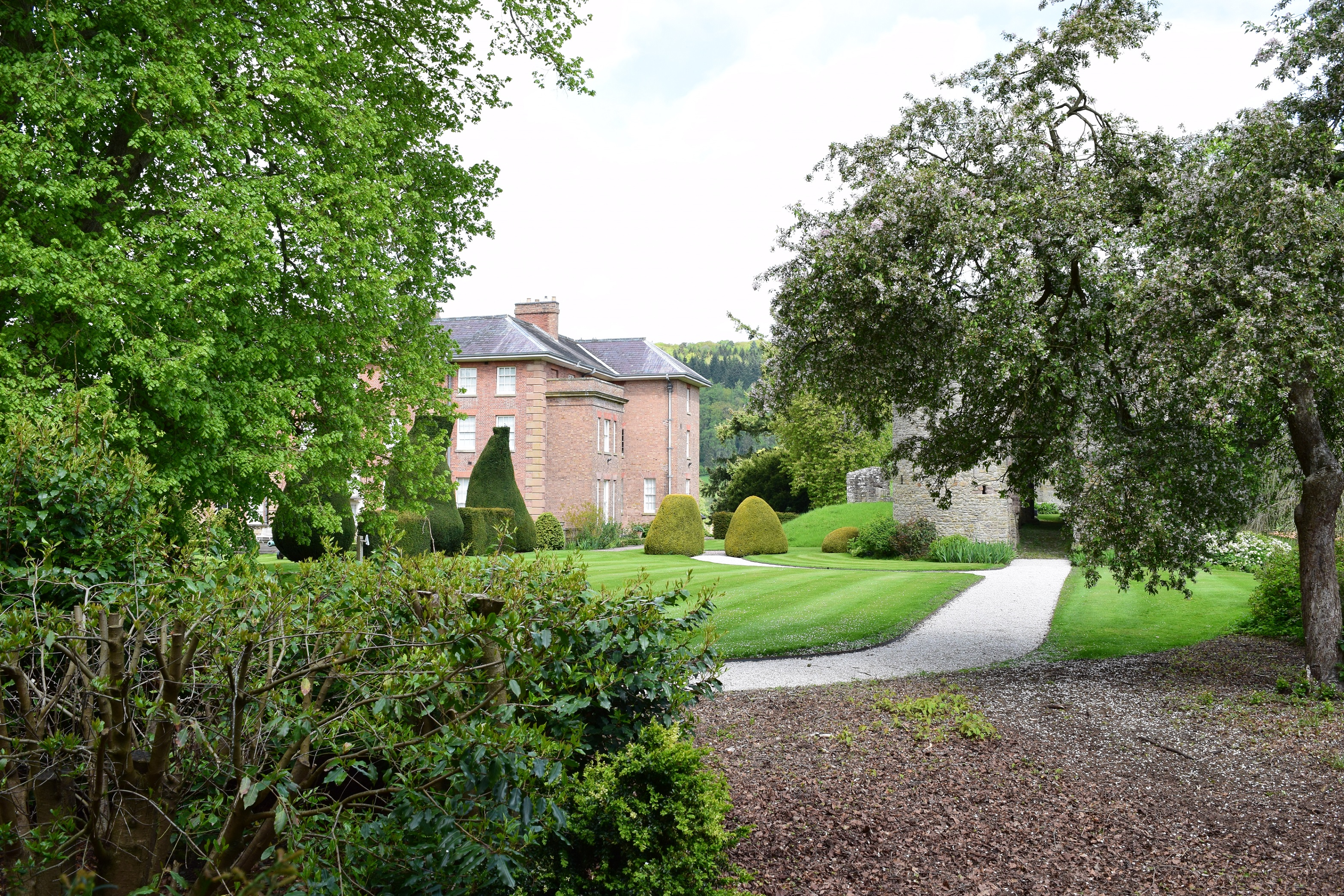
Brampton Bryan Hall and Castle

Brampton Bryan Hall is a large 17th and 18th-century brick built rectangular house which now stands near to the ruined castle, replacing earlier buildings. It is a Grade II* listed building The Hall is the home of the descendants of Sir Robert Harley, 1st Earl of Oxford.

The ruins of an earlier hall, just to the north of the castle, are listed at Grade I.

== Film and television location ==
The Civil War siege was featured in the Channel 4 documentary Blood on Our Hands. Brampton Bryan Hall was a location for the film Howards End.

== See also ==
- Castles in Great Britain and Ireland
- List of castles in England
