= Custos Rotulorum of Radnorshire =

Civic post in Radnorshire, Wales

This is a list of people who have served as Custos Rotulorum of Radnorshire.

- John Baker
- John Knill Aug, 1547
- Thomas Lewis 1564
- Gelli Meyrick 1598
- William Vaughan 1622
- Charles Price 1641–1645
- Richard Jones 1645–?
- Interregnum
- Sir Edward Harley 1660–1685
- Charles Somerset, Marquess of Worcester 1685–1689
- Sir Rowland Gwynne 1689–1702
- Robert Harley, 1st Earl of Oxford and Earl Mortimer 1702–1714
- Thomas Coningsby, 1st Earl Coningsby 1714–1721

For later custodes rotulorum, see Lord Lieutenant of Radnorshire.
