= William Greig =

William Greig may refer to:

- William Greig (politician) (1840–1918), farmer, lumber merchant and political figure in Quebec
- William Greig (songwriter), Newcastle songwriter
- W. D. O. Greig (William Dallas Ochterlony Greig), English footballer
- William Greig, Scottish prisoner of war during WWII who escaped and played a role in the Battle for Czech Radio

== See also ==
- James Greig (British politician) (James William Greig, 1859–1934), British barrister and politician
- William Greg, essayist
- William Gregg (disambiguation)
