= Brampton Bryan Hall =

Country house in Herefordshire, England

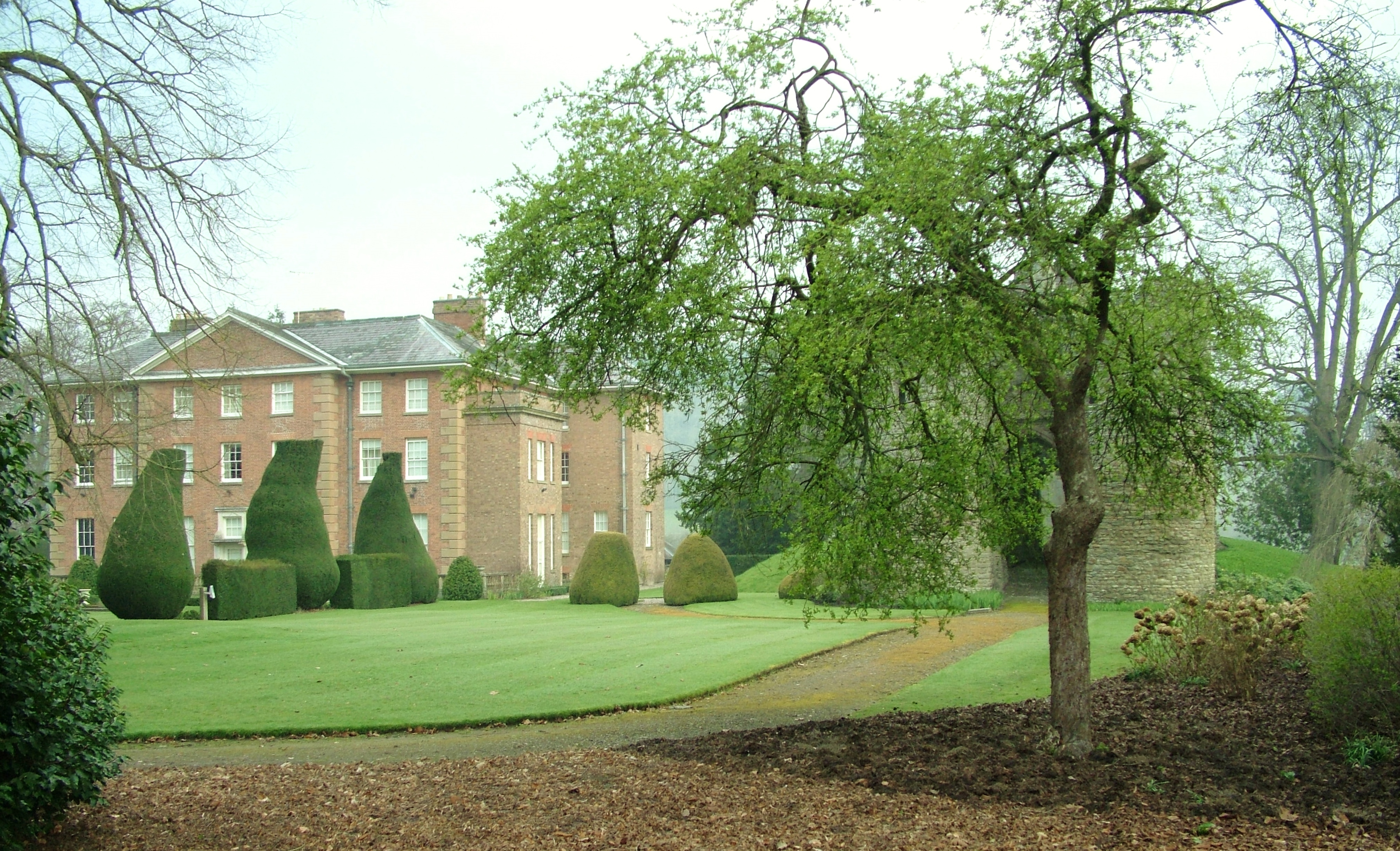
- Brampton Bryan Hall

- Location within Herefordshire

General information
- Location: Brampton Bryan, Herefordshire, England
- Coordinates: 52.347736°N 2.926325°W
- Completed: 17th / 18th century

Brampton Bryan Hall is a 17th-century English country house in the village of Brampton Bryan, Herefordshire. It is still owned by the descendants of Robert Harley, Earl of Oxford, chief minister under Queen Anne and is a Grade II* listed building.

The house was built around 1660 by Edward Harley to replace Brampton Bryan Castle, which had been destroyed during the Civil War. It was constructed in three storeys of brick and sandstone, with a Welsh slate roof and enhanced and enlarged in the 18th century.

== History ==
The Brampton Bryan estate had been owned by the Harley family since 1309, when Sir Robert Harley married Margaret de Brampton. It contained a deer park and is today Grade II listed in its own right. The family lived in the Brampton Bryan Castle until its slighting in 1644 by Parliamentarian forces during the ownership of Robert Harley, for which he later received significant financial compensation. His son Edward built the new house after the Restoration of the Monarchy.

The new house passed down in 1700 to Edward Harley's son Robert, who became the first Earl of Oxford in 1711 and then to his son Edward, the 2nd Earl, who however preferred to live at Wimpole Hall in Cambridgeshire which his wife had inherited. Brampton Bryan Hall nevertheless remained in the ownership of the Harley family, passing in 1741 to the 2nd Earl's cousin, Edward, the 3rd Earl. It then descended in turn to Edward, the 4th Earl, who died in the house in 1790, Edward, the 5th Earl, who also died there in 1848 and Edward, the 6th and last Earl. After that the estate passed in 1853 to a distant relative William Daker Harley.

The house would then be sometimes leased out; in the 1870s it was occupied by General George Staunton and family. The house is now the private home of Edward and Victoria Harley.

The house has been used as a film location, particularly as Henry Wilcox's country mansion in the Howards End film.
