= John Baker (died 1544) =

Welsh politician

John Baker (by 1503 – 21 January 1544), of Presteigne, Radnorshire was a Welsh politician.

He was the son of John Baker of Presteigne.

He was appointed High Sheriff of Radnorshire for 1540–1541 and elected a member (MP) of the parliament of England for Radnorshire in 1542. He also served as a deputy lieutenant and custos rotulorum for the county.

He married Catherine, the daughter of John Bradshaw of Ludlow, Shropshire and had at least 1 son.
