= Early-18th-century Whig plots =

Alleged plots in Great Britain

During the early 18th century, Great Britain was undergoing a government shift into a two party system. The leading conservative political grouping, the Tories, was the primary political party, but at the turn of the 18th century the Whigs, a liberal faction, had begun to rise in influence. As the parties struggled for power in Parliament, tensions rose. When the Whig Party continued to grow in power and influence, gaining more representation in Parliament and recognition in the general public, the Tories found themselves challenged over their policies and opinions. The arguments of government went beyond the House of Parliament. Public speeches, debates, and other forms of popular influence arose, creating a new style of politics. This was the environment that Princess Anne found herself when she became Queen of England, Scotland and Ireland on 8 March 1702. Her brother-in-law, William III of England and II of Scotland, who had preceded her, had been in support of the growing two party system, and in respect, Anne "endured" the Whigs despite her personal preference for the Tory party. The tensions between the parties had escalated to the point where party members became paranoid of conspiracies and conducted plots against one another. The Whigs concocted assassination plots against important Tory figures as an attempt to make way for their policies and political agendas.

The first accused conspiracy was that of the Screw Plot. This plot was assumed to be an assassination attempt on the life of Queen Anne in 1708. According to Tory belief, the Whigs planned to kill the Queen, and close advisers, by designing a chandelier to fall upon them. Although the accusations have been today determined as faulty, the Tories seeded doubt in the public eye. In 1712, the Whigs attempted to assassinate Robert Harley, Earl of Oxford, in what has been labelled as the Bandbox Plot.

== Two-party conflict ==
At the turn of the 18th century, the Whig influence in Parliament was rising. The Whigs and Tories’ major disagreements were in regards to who should run the country. The conservative, Tory, party supported the influence of the monarchy of the inner-goings of government, while the Whigs insisted that Parliament take on a greater role. By giving Parliament more power, the Whigs believed that the general population of the country would be able to control more of what actions the government takes. The Whigs also disagreed with the Tories on the influence of the church on government. During the turn of the 18th century, the church had a close tie with the monarchy, and thus had influence on decisions made by the government. This era was at the dawn of The Enlightenment, a time of political and social reformation. The Whigs supported many of the ideas about basic rights of the public. These growing issues were debated on frequently in Parliament, tensions rose, and political battles were then taken to the public eye.

== Screw Plot ==
The Screw Plot was an alleged assassination attempt on Queen Anne of England in 1708. In St. Paul's Cathedral, loose screws were discovered in the building's supporting beams above the seating area for the Queen, and it was suggested that these were intended to allow the beams to fall on the Queen and other government figures during her thanksgiving for the victory of Oudenarde. The Tories leaked to the press that the Whigs were to blame. Although later proved to be simply the result of poor construction work, tensions between the parties grew even greater.

=== Public opinion ===
When the newspaper reported that the Whigs had attempted to take the life of Queen Anne, the public was shocked. Despite the tensions between the parties, a conspiracy like this hadn't happened since the rule of James II. The Tories continued to personally attack the Whigs using cases similar to that of the Screw Plot to illustrate a sense of immorality among the party. Jonathan Swift, a famous author of the time, wrote many politically influenced poems and stories. His satires discussed many issues of the day, not only the Screw Plot. The Ballad Plot upon Plot focused on the many "pathetic" attempts of the Whigs to take down the Tory party.

"Some of your Machiavelian crew From heavy roof of Paul Most traitorously stole every screw, To make that fabric fall; And so to catch Her Majesty, And all her friends beguile." (Plot Upon Plot, Jonathan Swift)

By the nineteenth century, the Screw Plot was regarded as a hoax, simply an inefficient building project blown out of proportion by on-edge Tory Party members. Many recognized figures, such as Sir Walter Scott merely dismiss in-depth discussion in their works focusing on the time during Anne's reign. In Scott's collection of works by Jonathan Swift, he briefly mentions the plot in a footnote to explain the context of which Swift was writing a letter to Stella. Simpson Sparrow wrote an article about both the Screw Plot and the Bandbox Plot in 1892. He called the Screw Plot, "one of the greatest fables" of the Queen's reign. He mentions to his readers that in fact that St Paul's Cathedral was still undergoing construction when the plot was "unveiled" thus making the reality of a conspiracy unlikely.

== Bandbox Plot ==
This failed assassination took place in 1712, targeted at the British Lord Treasurer, Robert Harley. A hat box containing three pistols tied to the lid so that when opened they would fire, was sent to Harley. Jonathan Swift was with him and saw the attached string, so the men cut the string then opened the box to find the loaded pistols inside.
