= Perspicacity =

Great discernment or insight

Perspicacity (also called perspicaciousness) is a penetrating discernment (from the Latin perspicācitās, meaning throughsightedness, discrimination)—a clarity of vision or intellect which provides a deep understanding and insight. It extends the concept of wisdom by denoting a keenness of sense and intelligence applied to insight. It has been described as a deeper level of internalization. Another definition refers to it as the "ability to recognize subtle differences between similar objects or ideas".

The artist René Magritte illustrated the quality in his 1936 painting La Clairvoyance, which is sometimes referred to in the English speaking world as Perspicacity. The picture shows an artist at work who studies his subject intently: it is an egg. But the painting he is creating is not of an egg; it is an adult bird in flight.

The word "perspicacity" also indicates practical wisdom in the areas of politics and finance. Being perspicacious about other people, rather than having false illusions, is a sign of good mental health. The quality is needed in psychotherapists who engage in person-to-person dialogue and counseling of the mentally ill.

Perspicacity is different from acuity, which also describes a keen insight. While having closely related meanings, acuity emphasises sharpness, and its definition encompasses physical abilities such as sight or hearing; perspicacity conveys senses of meaning more related to clarity and penetration.

In 1966, the journal Science discussed NASA scientist-astronaut program recruitment efforts:

To quote an Academy brochure, the quality most needed by a scientist-astronaut is "perspicacity." He must, the brochure says, be able to quickly pick out, from among the thousands of things he sees, those that are significant, and to synthesize observations and develop and test working hypotheses.

== Concept ==
In 17th-century Europe, René Descartes devised systematic rules for clear thinking in his work Regulæ ad directionem ingenii (Rules for the direction of natural intelligence). In Descartes' scheme, intelligence consisted of two faculties: perspicacity, which provided an understanding or intuition of distinct detail; and sagacity, which enabled reasoning about the details in order to make deductions. Rule 9 was De Perspicacitate Intuitionis (On the Perspicacity of Intuition). He summarised the rule as

Oportet ingenii aciem ad res minimas et maxime faciles totam convertere, atque in illis diutius immorari, donec assuescamus veritatem distincte et perspicue intueri.

Translation:

We should totally focus the vision of the natural intelligence on the smallest and easiest things, and we should dwell on them for a long time, so long, until we have become accustomed to intuiting the truth distinctly and perspicaciously.

In his study of the elements of wisdom, the modern psychometrician Robert Sternberg identified perspicacity as one of its six components or dimensions; the other five being reasoning, sagacity, learning, judgement, and the expeditious use of information. In his analysis, the perspicacious individual is someone who

... has intuition; can offer solutions that are on the side of right and truth; is able to see through things—read between the lines; has the ability to understand and interpret his or her environment.

— Robert J. Sternberg, Wisdom: its nature, origins, and development

== See also ==
- Neuro-linguistic programming
- Organizational politics
- Stress management
- Temperament
- Time management
- Personality
