= William Gregg (clerk and spy) =

Scottish spy (??–1708)

William Gregg (died 1708) was a Scottish spy who had been a clerk to the Secretary of State, Robert Harley. He was executed for treason after it was discovered that he had been selling State secrets to the French. The affair gravely damaged Harley politically, as he was rightly criticised for facilitating Gregg's treason through his lax security arrangements, although it is generally accepted that he had no knowledge of the treason itself.

== Life ==
James Vernon, Secretary of State 1697-1702, had known Gregg's father, also named William Gregg, who was a diplomat. No doubt on his father's account, Vernon took the young Gregg into his service as his secretary, but had to dismiss him 'for his ill qualities', according to Gilbert Burnet. Gregg was indeed an unsuitable choice for such a position, as he had a criminal record and had narrowly escaped being found guilty of counterfeiting in 1697. His wife, who attempted to take all the blame on herself, was found guilty and, despite being pregnant, was sentenced to being branded on the hand. Nevertheless, when Robert Harley became secretary of state in 1706, he appointed Gregg to an underclerkship in his office, and even extended to him an exceptional amount of confidence. That, at any rate, was one explanation for the disaster which ensued; another, which has the authority of the celebrated author Daniel Defoe, then Gregg's fellow secretary, was that Harley's office was always in a state of the most complete disorder, and that papers of the gravest import were open to the inspection of every clerk, doorkeeper, or laundress in the establishment.

Antagonism was at its height between Godolphin and Harley at the close of 1707, and the Whigs were plotting to exclude Harley from the Privy Council. Intelligence came from the postmaster at Brussels that a packet of letters had been opened from the secretary's office and addressed to French minister Michel Chamillart, and they contained copies of important state papers; a covering note indicated that the copies were sent by Gregg. Gregg was arrested on 1 Jan. 1708, was examined by Sunderland on 3 January, and forthwith committed to Newgate. He was tried at the Old Bailey on 9 January for treasonable correspondence with France, pleaded guilty, and was sentenced to death.

The culprit pleaded in extenuation of his crime his poverty and heavy debts, but swore positively that he had no accomplice in his crime. He seems to have felt a strong sense of loyalty to Harley, despite his previous betrayal of him, and refused steadfastly to implicate him. The Whig leaders, however, were eager to obtain evidence against Harley, and were in great hopes that the unfortunate man would say something to convict his chief of complicity.

The House of Lords formed a committee of seven to examine Gregg, and placed upon it Charles Seymour, 6th Duke of Somerset and two other dukes, besides Thomas Wharton, 1st Marquess of Wharton, Charles Townshend, 2nd Viscount Townshend, Charles Montagu, 1st Earl of Halifax, and John Somers, 1st Baron Somers. The committee went to Newgate on 7 February and informed Gregg that, if he would make a full confession, he might rely upon the intercession of the house.

In spite of the temptation thus dangled before him, the poor fellow adhered manfully to the truth of his first statement. The committee had the cruelty to keep the condemned man in suspense for three months. At length, they sent Queen Anne a recommendation that the execution should take place, bitterly disappointed at making no other discovery than that the business of the secretary's office was conducted in a strangely lax manner. Gregg was hanged and quartered at Tyburn on 28 April 1708, and his head was placed in Westminster Hall. Before he met his fate, he delivered a paper to the ordinary in which he solemnly exculpated Harley from all participation in his offence. He also left a letter, the contrite tenor of which was warmly commended by Hearne. Harley found it necessary during the second week in February 1708 to resign his secretaryship, but he had the generosity to allow Gregg's widow a pension of fifty pounds annually out of his private purse.
