= Rowland Gwynne =

Welsh Whig politician

Rowland Gwynne FRS (c. 1658 – 24 January 1726) of Llanelwedd, Radnorshire, was a Welsh Whig politician.

Gwynne was born in about 1658, the eldest son of George Gwynne of Llanelwedd, by his wife Sybill, daughter of Roderick Gwynne, also of Llanelwedd. He succeeded to his father's estates in about 1673: at the time he was a very rich young man, but was later to waste his inheritance. He matriculated at St John's College, Oxford in 1674 aged 15, and was a law student at Gray's Inn in 1679.

He was in royal service to Charles II as Gentleman of the Privy Chamber from 1671 to 1683 and was knighted by the king in 1680. He was elected a Fellow of the Royal Society in 1681.

He was a member (MP) of the parliament of England for Radnorshire in March 1679, October 1679, 1681, and 1689, for Breconshire in 1690, 1698, February 1702 and December 1701, and for Bere Alston in 1695. He was a lifelong Whig, a firm opponent of the religious policies of James II, and a strong supporter of the Glorious Revolution, which put an end to his five-year exile in the Netherlands. He was Treasurer of the Chamber, a minor Court office, 1689–93, and in good standing with William III of Orange. After William's death he was one of the first to try to ingratiate himself with the House of Hanover, and spent much of the reign of Queen Anne in Hanover and Hamburg, but his efforts to win the goodwill of the future George I of Great Britain were unsuccessful.

He married Mary, daughter of William Bassett of Broviscan, Glamorganshire, an heiress. They were childless, and she died before him in 1722.

He was heavily in debt on leaving parliament, having wasted his own inheritance and his wife's fortune: "he spent it all in a few years, eating and rioting". He died in Southwark, south London, on 24 January 1726, aged 66, "under the rules of the King's Bench": in other words, he was technically in prison for debt, but the rules of the King's Bench Prison allowed him a certain amount of liberty in practice.
