= Brampton Bryan =

Village and civil parish in Herefordshire, England

Coordinates: 52.3469°N 2.9189°W

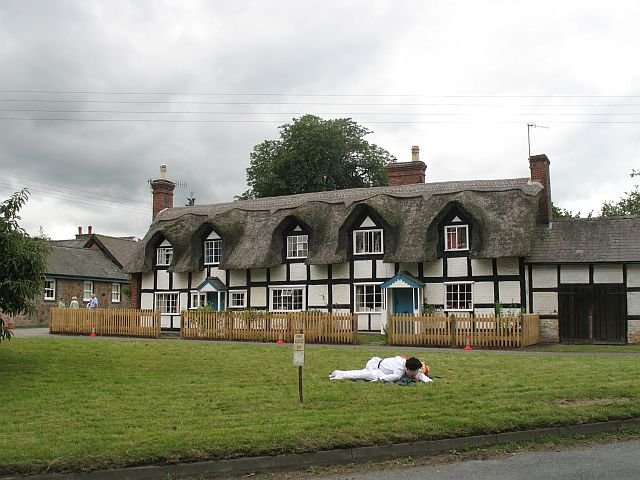

- Location within Herefordshire
- OS grid reference: SO375725
- Civil parish: Brampton Bryan
- Unitary authority: Herefordshire
- Ceremonial county: Herefordshire
- Region: West Midlands
- Country: England
- Sovereign state: United Kingdom
- Post town: BUCKNELL
- Postcode district: SY7
- Dialling code: 01547
- Police: West Mercia
- Fire: Hereford and Worcester
- Ambulance: West Midlands
- UK Parliament: North Herefordshire

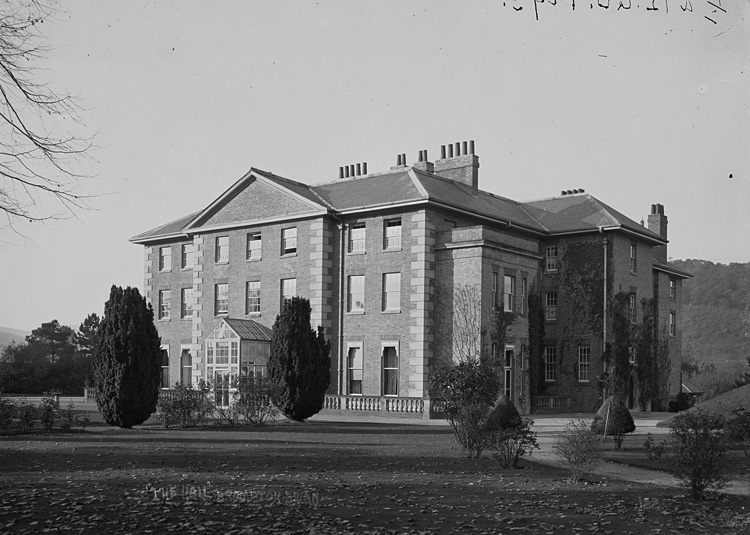
Brampton Bryan Hall; c. 1930s

Brampton Bryan is a small village and civil parish situated in north Herefordshire, England close to the Shropshire and Welsh borders.

Brampton Bryan lies midway between Leintwardine and Knighton on the A4113 road. The nearest station is Bucknell railway station on the Heart of Wales Line. The village has had a complex history and its buildings reflect this. Much of Brampton Bryan is owned by the estate of the Harley family who have controlled the area since the early fourteenth century. They succeeded the powerful Mortimer family.

As well as the main village, the parish contains the hamlets of Boresford and Pedwardine.

== Buildings ==
The ruins of Brampton Bryan Castle are on a floodplain south of the River Teme, 50 metres (160 ft) north of the church. From this site the castle guarded an important route from Ludlow along the Teme Valley to Knighton and on into Central Wales. The area has been important since Roman times and the village is a few miles west of Leintwardine - an important Roman site.

The current buildings include the ruined earthwork and buried remains of the quadrangular castle. The medieval layout consisted of four ranges built around a courtyard, with a gatehouse contained within the southern curtain wall, to which a large outer gatehouse was added. The whole was constructed on a motte and surrounded by a moat, with the approach to the castle being from the south across a bridge to the gatehouse.

The north range contained the hall and service bay, both at first floor level, with the kitchen to the east. Private accommodation was found in the other ranges, with further chambers above the gate passage of the inner gatehouse and on the first floor of the outer gatehouse. The current house was built following the English Civil War and is largely eighteenth century.

St Barnabas Church was built in 1656, during the period of the Commonwealth. It replaces an earlier building that was destroyed during the siege of Brampton Bryan castle in 1643. Whilst from the outside the church has a considerable appeal, once entered the effect is unnerving due to its breadth being entirely out of proportion to its length. Its nave and chancel are one and covered by a very fine double hammerbeam roof. It was thought that the roof may well have been constructed from the ruins of the castle, but recent research as part of the Heritage Lottery bid has tended to rule that possibility out. It contains an early 14th-century monument to Lady Margaret de Brampton, who is shown holding her heart in her hands. It is a Grade I listed building. For more details see the Wigmore Abbey site. Robert Harley, 1st Earl of Oxford and Earl Mortimer, statesman of the late Stuart and early Georgian periods, is buried in the churchyard. The church is on Historic England's list of buildings at risk.

Other buildings within the village include a number of fine Georgian houses and some earlier timber-framed buildings situated around the small triangular green. Parson's Pole Bridge is situated in the civil parish and takes the lane from Brampton Bryan to the hamlets of Buckton and Coxall across the River Teme.

== History ==
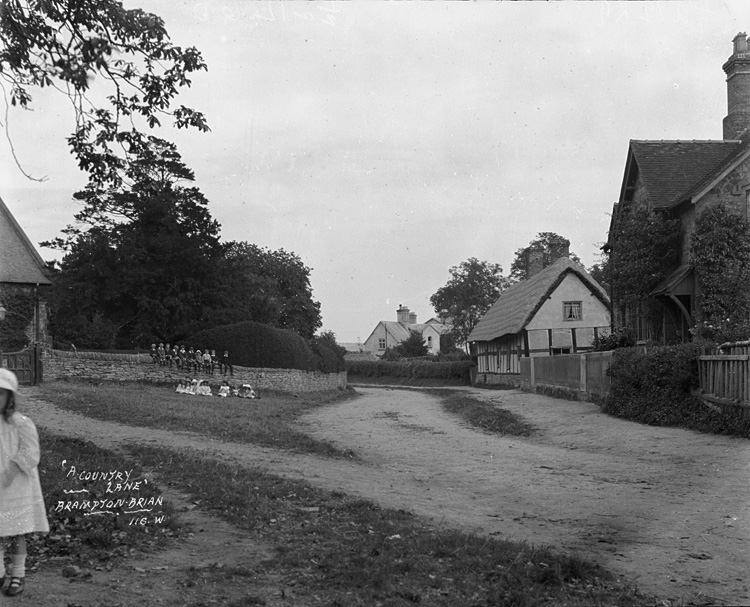
'A country lane' Brampton Bryan

The village is mentioned in the Domesday Survey when it formed part of the estate of Ralph de Mortimer although evidence of occupation extends back to at least Roman times, as the remains of a temporary marching camp lie near the village.

The name means 'Broom farm/settlement'. 'Bryan' probably refers to one Brian Unspac.

During the First English Civil War, Brampton Bryan Castle was held for Parliament by Lady Brilliana Harley during the first of two sieges. The first siege started on 26 July 1643 when Royalists surrounded Brampton Bryan. Although the village was put to the torch (the church, the parsonage, 40 houses and the castle mills were all burnt down), and the castle left without a roof, the Royalists failed to capture the castle, ending the siege on 9 September. Lady Brilliana died later that year, probably due to ill health brought on by the siege. In the spring of 1644, the Royalists began a new siege that lasted for three weeks. This time the castle defences were so weakened by undermining and battering by artillery, that the Parliamentary governor surrendered the castle. It was then sacked and burnt, while the garrison was sent to be imprisoned in Royalist-controlled Shrewsbury.

There was also a castle in Pedwardine, south of the main village, that belonged to the Hay family.

== Today ==
Today the village in addition to its church possesses a tearoom and a large bookshop, "Aardvark Books", which sells over 50,000 titles, and a remarkable and ancient yew hedge.

The Herefordshire Trail long-distance footpath passes through the village.
