= Brilliana, Lady Harley =

English letter writer

Brilliana
- Lady Harley
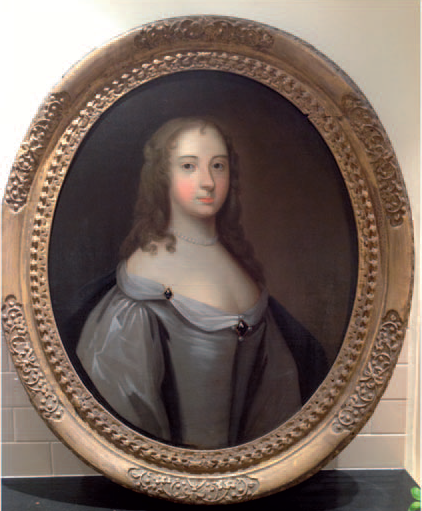
- Known for: letter-writing
- Born: Brilliana Conway; 1598
- Died: 29 October 1643 (aged 44–45)
- Residence: Brampton Bryan Castle
- Wars and battles: English Civil War
- Spouse: Sir Robert Harley
- Issue: 7, including Sir Edward Harley
- Father: Sir Edward Conway

Brilliana, Lady Harley (1598 – 29 October 1643), née Brilliana Conway, was an English letter writer.

Her name was coined by her father, Sir Edward Conway, English governor of Brielle (called Brill in English) in Holland with the suffix -ian as a demonym and the Latin feminine suffix -a.

== Letters ==
Some of Lady Harley's 375 letters to her husband, Sir Robert Harley and her son Sir Edward Harley survive and show her to be an educated literary woman, at home in several languages. She was able to keep her husband informed of local political affairs when he was absent from home at Brampton Bryan in northwest Herefordshire, attending Parliament or for other reasons, and organised the collection of information locally for the Parliamentary Committee on Scandalous Ministers. She was deeply religious, and her letters frequently repeat religious sentiments and encouraged her family in their chosen Puritan practices. The letters also contain passages relating to personal details of their family life.

== English Civil War ==
During the English Civil War, in the absence of her husband and sons, Lady Harley defended her home, Brampton Bryan Castle, during a three-month siege by Royalist troops until the troops withdrew because they were needed at Gloucester. She then compelled her tenants to level the Royalist siege earthworks. She also dispatched 40 troops to raid a local Royalist camp at Knighton.

== Death ==
Lady Harley died of pneumonia on 29 October 1643, probably as a result of the hardships endured during the siege.

By tradition (with a few gaps) the eldest daughters of Lady Harley's female descendants have given each eldest daughter the middle name of Brilliana.

== Bibliography ==
Lady Brilliana Harley's published correspondence can be found in three volumes:

- Harley, Lady Brilliana (1854), Lewis, Thomas Taylor (ed.), Letters of the Lady Brilliana Harley, Wife of Sir Robert Harley, of Brampton Bryan, Knight of the Bath, Camden Society
- Historical Manuscripts Commission (1904), Calendar of the manuscripts of the Marquis of Bath, Preserved at Longleat, Wiltshire, vol. 1, His Majesty's Stationery Office, p. 8–21
- Three letters, two dated August 24 and one August 25, which passed between Lady Harley and Sir J. Scudamore are printed from copies at Welbeck on pp. 114, 115 of the first volume of the report on the Harley papers belonging to the Duke of Portland (Fourteenth Report, Appendix. Part II).

The British Library holds many unpublished letters from Lady Harley.
