= List of Crepidotus species =

This is a list of the species in the fungal genus Crepidotus.

- Crepidotus acanthosyrinus Singer (1952)
- Crepidotus acerinus Vacek (1949)
- Crepidotus affinis E. Horak (2018)
- Crepidotus alabamensis Murrill (1917)
- Crepidotus albatus Hesler & A.H. Sm. (1965)
- Crepidotus albescens (Murrill) Redhead (1984)
- Crepidotus albissimus Murrill (1943)
- Crepidotus albolanatus E. Horak (2018)
- Crepidotus alnicola Hesler & A.H. Sm. (1965)
- Crepidotus alveolus (Lasch) P. Kumm. (1871)
- Crepidotus ampullicystis Singer (1973)
- Crepidotus angustifolius Hesler & A.H. Sm. (1965)
- Crepidotus antillarum (Pat.) Singer (1947)
- Crepidotus apodus Capelari (2006)
- Crepidotus appalachianensis Hesler & A.H. Sm. (1965)
- Crepidotus applanatus (Pers.) P. Kumm. (1871)
- Crepidotus aquosus Murrill (1913)
- Crepidotus argipodus (Singer) Guzm.-Dáv., C.K. Pradeep & Aime (2017)
- Crepidotus aristoteliae Singer (1962)
- Crepidotus asiaticus Guzm.-Dáv., C.K. Pradeep & T.J. Baroni (2017)
- Crepidotus aurantiacus Bres. (1907)
- Crepidotus aureifolius Hesler & A.H. Sm. (1965)
- Crepidotus aureus E. Horak (1978)
- Crepidotus australis Singer (1973)
- Crepidotus austroandinus Singer (1969)
- Crepidotus autochthonus J.E. Lange (1940)
- Crepidotus avellaneus Hesler & A.H. Sm. (1965)
- Crepidotus badiofloccosus S. Imai (1939)
- Crepidotus bakerae Ueki & C.W. Sm. (1973)
- Crepidotus betulae Murrill (1917)
- Crepidotus bicolor Murrill (1913)
- Crepidotus boninensis (Hongo) E. Horak & Desjardin (2004)
- Crepidotus brasiliensis Rick (1930)
- Crepidotus bresadolae Pilát (1948)
- Crepidotus brunneomarginatus E. Horak (2018)
- Crepidotus brunneoroseus Courtec. (1994)
- Crepidotus brunnescens Hesler & A.H. Sm. (1965)
- Crepidotus brunneus Hesler (1975)
- Crepidotus brunswickianus (Speg.) Sacc. (1891)
- Crepidotus bufonius Velen. (1947)
- Crepidotus bullulifer Singer (1965)
- Crepidotus byssinus T. Kasuya & Takah. Kobay. (2011)
- Crepidotus calolepidoides Murrill (1913)
- Crepidotus calolepis (Fr.) P. Karst. (1879)
- Crepidotus campylus Hesler & A.H. Sm. (1965)
- Crepidotus candidus Capelari (2006)
- Crepidotus capreae Velen. (1947)
- Crepidotus carneolus E. Horak (2018)
- Crepidotus carpaticus Pilát (1929)
- Crepidotus carpatorossicus Pilát (1949)
- Crepidotus caspari Velen. (1926)
- Crepidotus catamarcae Singer (1973)
- Crepidotus caveatus (Berk. & M.A. Curtis) Murrill (1916)
- Crepidotus cesatii (Rabenh.) Sacc. (1877)
- Crepidotus chilensis E. Horak (1964)
- Crepidotus cinchonensis Murrill (1913)
- Crepidotus cinereipallens Hesler & A.H. Sm. (1965)
- Crepidotus cinnabarinus Peck (1895)
- Crepidotus cinnamomeus Hesler & A.H. Sm. (1965)
- Crepidotus circinatus Hesler & A.H. Sm. (1965)
- Crepidotus citri Pat. (1902)
- Crepidotus citricolor Singer (1952)
- Crepidotus citrinus Petch (1924)
- Crepidotus coloradensis Hesler & A.H. Sm. (1965)
- Crepidotus commiscibilis (Berk. & M.A. Curtis) Murrill (1916)
- Crepidotus conchatus Hesler & A.H. Sm. (1965)
- Crepidotus confertus Hesler & A.H. Sm. (1965)
- Crepidotus connatus (Berk.) Murrill (1916)
- Crepidotus constans Hesler & A.H. Sm. (1965)
- Crepidotus contortus Hesler & A.H. Sm. (1965)
- Crepidotus crataegi Velen. (1929)
- Crepidotus cristatus Senn-Irlet & Immerzeel (2003)
- Crepidotus croceotinctus Peck (1887)
- Crepidotus crocophyllus (Berk.) Sacc. (1887)
- Crepidotus cuneiformis Pat. (1902)
- Crepidotus cystidiosus Hesler & A.H. Sm. (1965)
- Crepidotus decipiens Singer (1973)
- Crepidotus decurrens States (1973)
- Crepidotus defibulatus Singer (1952)
- Crepidotus dentatus T. Bau & Y.P. Ge (2020)
- Crepidotus dilutus E. Horak (2018)
- Crepidotus distortus Hesler & A.H. Sm. (1965)
- Crepidotus dorsalis Sacc. (1887)
- Crepidotus eburneus Hesler & A.H. Sm. (1965)
- Crepidotus eccentricus Murrill (1917)
- Crepidotus echinosporus Henn. (1895)
- Crepidotus edulis Overeem (1927)
- Crepidotus effusus Pegler (1977)
- Crepidotus ehrendorferi Hauskn. & Krisai (1989)
- Crepidotus epibryus (Fr.) Quél. (1888)
- Crepidotus epigloeus Singer (1973)
- Crepidotus eucalypti (Torrend) Singer (1951)
- Crepidotus eucalypticola Singer (1977)
- Crepidotus eucalyptorum Cleland (1924)
- Crepidotus euterpicola Senn-Irlet & de Meijer (1998)
- Crepidotus exilis A.M. Kumar & C.K. Pradeep (2020)
- Crepidotus exoticus Velen. (1929)
- Crepidotus fimbriatus Hesler & A.H. Sm. (1965)
- Crepidotus flavescens Rick (1961)
- Crepidotus flavus Capelari (2011)
- Crepidotus flexuosus Hesler & A.H. Sm. (1965)
- Crepidotus formosus (Quél.) Sacc. & Traverso (1910)
- Crepidotus forsteri (Speg.) Speg. (1891)
- Crepidotus fraxini Velen. (1940)
- Crepidotus fraxinicola Murrill (1917)
- Crepidotus fulvifibrillosus Murrill (1917)
- Crepidotus fulvotomentosus (Peck) Peck (1887)
- Crepidotus fumosifolius Murrill (1913)
- Crepidotus funalis Rick (1938)
- Crepidotus fungiphilus Hauskn. & Krisai (2010)
- Crepidotus furcatus Hesler & A.H. Sm. (1965)
- Crepidotus fuscovelutinus E. Horak (2018)
- Crepidotus fuscus E. Horak (2018)
- Crepidotus fusisporus Hesler & A.H. Sm. (1965)
- Crepidotus gayi Pilát (1951)
- Crepidotus geophilus (Murrill) Redhead (1984)
- Crepidotus gilvidus E. Horak (2018)
- Crepidotus globisporus A.M. Kumar & C.K. Pradeep (2020)
- Crepidotus graminum Velen. (1921)
- Crepidotus guzmanii Singer (1973)
- Crepidotus haerens (Peck) Sacc. (1887)
- Crepidotus haloxyli Samgina (1982)
- Crepidotus hamulatus Hesler & A.H. Sm. (1965)
- Crepidotus harperi Singer (1960)
- Crepidotus helicus Hesler & A.H. Sm. (1965)
- Crepidotus hemiphlebius (Berk. & M.A. Curtis) Murrill (1916)
- Crepidotus herbarum Peck (1887)
- Crepidotus herrerae Bandala & Montoya (2008)
- Crepidotus heterocystidiosus T. Bau & Y.P. Ge (2020)
- Crepidotus hirsutellus E. Horak (1978)
- Crepidotus hygrophanus Murrill (1917)
- Crepidotus ibericus (G. Moreno & Esteve-Rav.) Bandala, Esteve-Rav. & Montoya (2008)
- Crepidotus icterinus Singer (1973)
- Crepidotus igapoensis Singer (1989)
- Crepidotus improvisus (E. Horak) T.W. May & A.E. Wood (1995)
- Crepidotus inconspicuus E. Horak (2018)
- Crepidotus indicus Manojk. & C.K. Pradeep (2018)
- Crepidotus innuopurpureus McMull.-Fish., T. Lebel & Senn-Irlet (2021)
- Crepidotus iqbalii A. Izhar, Usman & Khalid (2021)
- Crepidotus isabellinus E. Horak (2018)
- Crepidotus juniperi Velen. (1947)
- Crepidotus kangoliformis Desjardin & B.A. Perry (2016)
- Crepidotus kauffmanii Hesler & A.H. Sm. (1965)
- Crepidotus krieglsteineri Singer (1988)
- Crepidotus kubickae Pilát (1949)
- Crepidotus laceratus Pat. (1902)
- Crepidotus lagenicystis Hesler & A.H. Sm. (1965)
- Crepidotus lanuginosus Hesler & A.H. Sm. (1965)
- Crepidotus larsenii Pilát (1948)
- Crepidotus lateralipes E. Horak (2018)
- Crepidotus latifolius Peck (1899)
- Crepidotus lentinoides Earle (1906)
- Crepidotus levisporus Singer (1973)
- Crepidotus lingulatus Velen. (1929)
- Crepidotus longicomatus Har. Takah. (2003)
- Crepidotus longicystidiatus Capelari (2011)
- Crepidotus longicystis (Hesler & A.H. Sm.) Singer (1973)
- Crepidotus longisporus M. Lange (1957)
- Crepidotus longistriatus S. Imai (1938)
- Crepidotus luridus Singer (1973)
- Crepidotus luteicolor Hesler & A.H. Sm. (1965)
- Crepidotus luteolus Sacc. (1887)
- Crepidotus luteoviridis Henn. (1899)
- Crepidotus lutescens T. Bau & Y.P. Ge (2017)
- Crepidotus macedonicus Pilát (1949)
- Crepidotus maculans Hesler & A.H. Sm. (1965)
- Crepidotus malachioides Consiglio, Prydiuk & Setti (2008)
- Crepidotus malachius Sacc. (1887)
- Crepidotus malenconii Courtec. (2009)
- Crepidotus martinii Singer (1955)
- Crepidotus maximus Hesler & A.H. Sm. (1965)
- Crepidotus melleus (Berk. & Broome) Petch (1924)
- Crepidotus mexicanus Singer (1973)
- Crepidotus microcarpus Malençon (1975)
- Crepidotus microsporus (P. Karst.) Pilát (1948)
- Crepidotus milleri Hesler & A.H. Sm. (1965)
- Crepidotus minutus (Peck) Murrill (1916)
- Crepidotus molfinoi Speg. (1926)
- Crepidotus molliformis Singer (1973)
- Crepidotus mollis (Schaeff.) Staude (1857)
- Crepidotus montanensis Hesler & A.H. Sm. (1965)
- Crepidotus montanus Hesler & A.H. Sm. (1965)
- Crepidotus mucidifolius Hesler & A.H. Sm. (1965)
- Crepidotus muscigenus Velen. (1947)
- Crepidotus mutabilis E. Horak (2018)
- Crepidotus nanicus E. Horak (1978)
- Crepidotus neocystidiosus P.G. Liu (1995)
- Crepidotus neotrichocystis Consiglio & Setti (2008)
- Crepidotus nephrodes (Berk. & M.A. Curtis) Sacc. (1887)
- Crepidotus niveus Velen. (1947)
- Crepidotus novae-zelandiae Pilát (1951)
- Crepidotus nyssicola (Murrill) Singer (1973)
- Crepidotus obfuscens Hesler & A.H. Sm. (1965)
- Crepidotus obscurus Hesler & A.H. Sm. (1965)
- Crepidotus occidentalis Hesler & A.H. Sm. (1965)
- Crepidotus occultus E. Horak (2018)
- Crepidotus ochraceus Hesler & A.H. Sm. (1965)
- Crepidotus odoratus Velen. (1947)
- Crepidotus ostreatoides Henn. & E. Nyman (1899)
- Crepidotus pactolus Cooke ex Pilát (1951)
- Crepidotus pallidobrunneus Hesler & A.H. Sm. (1965)
- Crepidotus pallidoluteus Hesler & A.H. Sm. (1965)
- Crepidotus palmarum Singer (1952)
- Crepidotus palodensis C.K. Pradeep & A.M. Kumar (2018)
- Crepidotus parasiticus Massee ex Pilát (1951)
- Crepidotus parietalis E. Horak (1978)
- Crepidotus parlatorei Singer (1952)
- Crepidotus parvulus Murrill (1913)
- Crepidotus paxilloides Singer (1951)
- Crepidotus payettensis Hesler & A.H. Sm. (1965)
- Crepidotus pedicellatus Velen. (1940)
- Crepidotus phaeton (Cooke & Massee) Sacc. (1891)
- Crepidotus phaseoliformis Hesler & A.H. Sm. (1965)
- Crepidotus pilatii Velen. (1929)
- Crepidotus pilosiceps Singer (1989)
- Crepidotus pinicola M. Zang (1999)
- Crepidotus plumulosus E. Horak (2018)
- Crepidotus podocarpi Singer (1952)
- Crepidotus poincola Velen. (1940)
- Crepidotus polylepidis Singer (1962)
- Crepidotus pouceensis Pilát (1951)
- Crepidotus praecipuus E. Horak (2018)
- Crepidotus praelatifolius Murrill (1940)
- Crepidotus prostratus Cleland (1934)
- Crepidotus pruni Velen. (1921)
- Crepidotus pseudoantillarum Bandala, Montoya & M. Mata (2008)
- Crepidotus pseudoflammeus Hesler & A.H. Sm. (1965)
- Crepidotus pseudomollis T. Bau & Y.P. Ge (2020)
- Crepidotus psychotriae Pat. (1902)
- Crepidotus quitensis Pat. (1893)
- Crepidotus rainierensis Hesler & A.H. Sm. (1965)
- Crepidotus ramosus Hesler & A.H. Sm. (1965)
- Crepidotus regularis Hesler & A.H. Sm. (1965)
- Crepidotus reniformis Velen. (1921)
- Crepidotus reticulatus T. Bau & Y.P. Ge (2020)
- Crepidotus rhizomorphus Burt (1923)
- Crepidotus ridleyi Massee (1899)
- Crepidotus roseibrunneus Hesler & A.H. Sm. (1965)
- Crepidotus roseolus Singer (1974)
- Crepidotus roseoornatus Pöder & E. Ferrari (1984)
- Crepidotus roseus Singer (1947)
- Crepidotus rubriceps Singer (1973)
- Crepidotus rubrovinosus Bandala, Montoya & E. Horak (2006)
- Crepidotus rufidulus E. Horak (2018)
- Crepidotus rufofloccosus E. Horak (2018)
- Crepidotus salicinus Velen. (1947)
- Crepidotus salmonicolor Cleland & Cheel (1918)
- Crepidotus sambuci Velen. (1922)
- Crepidotus sarawakensis Pilát (1951)
- Crepidotus schizophylloides Henn. (1899)
- Crepidotus schusteri Singer (1989)
- Crepidotus semiorbatus E. Horak (2018)
- Crepidotus sepiarius Peck (1898)
- Crepidotus septicoides (Singer) Singer (1973)
- Crepidotus serotinus Singer (1962)
- Crepidotus sikkimensis Locq. & Sarwal (1983)
- Crepidotus sinuosus Hesler & A.H. Sm. (1965)
- Crepidotus smithii Hesler (1975)
- Crepidotus spathulatus Bres. (1894)
- Crepidotus stenocystis Pouzar (2005)
- Crepidotus stercorarius Singer (1952)
- Crepidotus stipitatus Kauffman (1918)
- Crepidotus stratosus Hesler & A.H. Sm. (1965)
- Crepidotus striatus T. Bau & Y.P. Ge (2020)
- Crepidotus stromaticus (Cooke & Massee) Sacc. (1887)
- Crepidotus subaffinis Pilát (1951)
- Crepidotus subapplanatus Hesler & A.H. Sm. (1965)
- Crepidotus subaureifolius Hesler & A.H. Sm. (1965)
- Crepidotus subcroceitinctus Hesler & A.H. Sm. (1965)
- Crepidotus subcuneiformis Murrill (1913)
- Crepidotus subelatinus (Murrill) Pegler (1987)
- Crepidotus subepibryus Pilát (1949)
- Crepidotus subepicrocinus Pilát (1951)
- Crepidotus subfibrillosus Hesler & A.H. Sm. (1965)
- Crepidotus subfulviceps (Murrill) Aime, Vila & P.-A. Moreau (2009)
- Crepidotus subhaustellaris Cleland (1924)
- Crepidotus sublatifolius Hesler & A.H. Sm. (1965)
- Crepidotus sublevisporus Singer (1952)
- Crepidotus subluteus Hesler & A.H. Sm. (1965)
- Crepidotus submollis Murrill (1912)
- Crepidotus substipitatus Murrill (1913)
- Crepidotus sububer Hesler & A.H. Sm. (1965)
- Crepidotus subverrucisporus Pilát (1949)
- Crepidotus sulcatus Murrill (1913)
- Crepidotus sulphurinus Imazeki & Toki (1954)
- Crepidotus tahquamenonensis Hesler & A.H. Sm. (1965)
- Crepidotus tener Henn. (1896)
- Crepidotus tennesseensis Hesler (1975)
- Crepidotus terrestris S. Imai (1938)
- Crepidotus thermophilus (Singer) Aime, T.J. Baroni & O.K. Mill. (2002)
- Crepidotus tirolensis Pilát (1939)
- Crepidotus tjibodensis Henn. (1899)
- Crepidotus tobolensis Kapitonov, Biketova & Zmitr. (2019)
- Crepidotus togoensis Henn. (1895)
- Crepidotus trichocraspedotus T. Bau & Y.P. Ge (2020)
- Crepidotus trulliformis E. Horak (2018)
- Crepidotus trullisporus Pegler (1977)
- Crepidotus truncatus Petch (1924)
- Crepidotus tucumanus E. Horak (1964)
- Crepidotus tuxtlae Singer (1973)
- Crepidotus unicus Hesler & A.H. Sm. (1965)
- Crepidotus valdivianus E. Horak (1964)
- Crepidotus valvatus Velen. (1947)
- Crepidotus variabilis (Pers.) P. Kumm. (1871)
- Crepidotus variegatus E. Horak (2018)
- Crepidotus variicolor Hesler & A.H. Sm. (1965)
- Crepidotus variisporus Singer (1952)
- Crepidotus velenovskyi Pilát (1949)
- Crepidotus versutus Peck (1887)
- Crepidotus villosus Hesler & A.H. Sm. (1965)
- Crepidotus virgineus Har. Takah. (2003)
- Crepidotus viridipyllus Hesler (1975)
- Crepidotus viscidiphyllus Hesler (1975)
- Crepidotus viticola S. Imai (1938)
- Crepidotus volubilis C.K. Pradeep & A.M. Kumar (2018)
- Crepidotus vulgaris Hesler & A.H. Sm. (1965)
- Crepidotus wasseri Kapitonov, Biketova, Zmitr. & Á. Kovács (2021)
- Crepidotus xanthocephalus Singer (1973)
- Crepidotus xanthophaeus Singer (1973)
- Crepidotus xerotoides Speg. (1921)
- Crepidotus yungicola Singer (1973)
- Crepidotus zingiberaceicola Henn. (1897)
