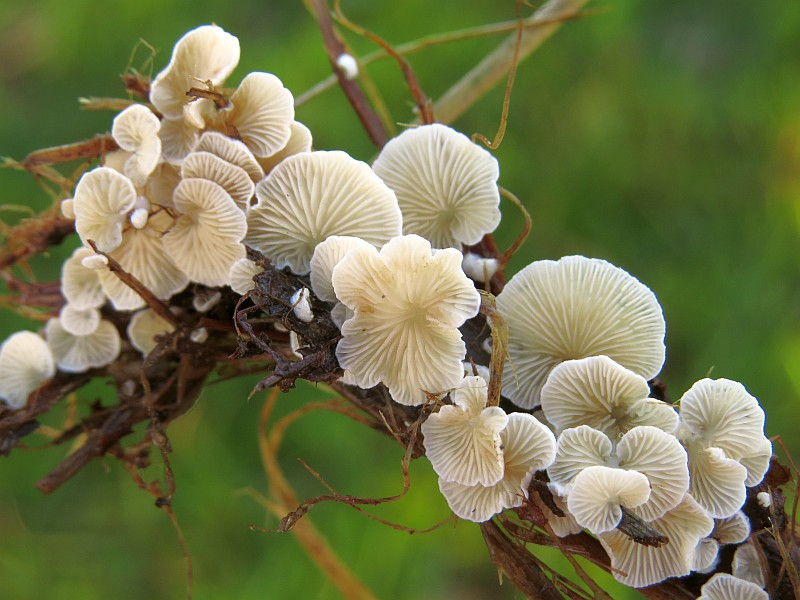
- Crepidotus epibryus

Scientific classification
- Kingdom: Fungi
- Division: Basidiomycota
- Class: Agaricomycetes
- Order: Agaricales
- Family: Crepidotaceae
- Genus: Crepidotus
- Species: C. epibryus

Binomial name
- Crepidotus epibryus Quél, (1888)

Synonyms
- Agaricus epibryus Fr., 1821; Crepidotus hypnophilus (Pers.) Nordstein, 1990; Dendrosarcus hypnophilus (Pers.) Kuntze, 1898; Dochmiopus commixtus (Bres.) Singer, 1936; Dochmiopus epibryus (Fr.) Romagn., 1937; Derminus herbarum Henn., 1898; Phialocybe epibrya (Fr.) P. Karst., 1879; Pleurotellus epibryus (Fr.) Zmitr., 2004

= Crepidotus epibryus =

Species of fungus

Crepidotus epibryus
- Mycological characteristics
- Gills on hymenium
- Cap is convex
- Hymenium is free
- Lacks a stipe
- Spore print is buff
- Ecology is saprotrophic
- Edibility is inedible

Crepidotus epibryus, also known as the grass oysterling, is a species of saprophytic fungi in the family Crepidotaceae. It is seen in late summer and autumn.

== Description ==
- Cap: The cap (pileus) of C. epibryus is generally about 0.4 to 1.5 cm in diameter and is convex kidney shaped fanned, coloured white or pale buff with upper tomentose (finely felted) surface.
- Gills: On the underside, the gills (lamellae) are crowded and are classified as free with no stipe to connect to. The colour of the gills depends on maturity ranging from white when young to pinkish brown as the spores mature.
- Spores: The spore print is pale buff. The ellipsoid-shaped basidiospore of C. epibryus are 7-9 by 3-3.5 µm in size.
- Absent features- No stipe (stem) or annulus (ring).

== Similar species ==
- Crepidotus variabilis is typically larger, has a smoother cap surface and does not have an inrolled cap margin.

== Distribution ==
Common in Britain and Ireland, this fungi occurs in mainland Europe and North America.
