= Vincenzo de Cesati =

Italian botanist (1806–1883)

Portrait of Vincenzo Cesati de Vigadore.

Vincenzo de Cesati (1806–1883), baron of Vigadore, was an Italian botanist from Milan.

He studied natural history and law at the University of Vienna, and afterwards worked as a volunteer at the Collegium Nacionale de Vercelli. From 1868 to 1883 he was director of the botanical garden at Naples. The majority of his plant collection is now preserved at the botanical institute of the University of Rome.

The plant genus Cesatia from the family Apiaceae and fungi species Crepidotus cesatii are named after him.

== Works ==
With Giovanni Passerini (1816–1893) and Giuseppe Gibelli (1831–1898), he was author of "Compendio della flora italiana", a compendium of Italian flora. With Francesco Baglietto and Giuseppe De Notaris he edited the exsiccata series Erbario crittogamico Italiano.

Other works by Cesati include:

- Stirpes Italicae: iconografia universale delle piante italiane (Pyrole, Milan, 1840)
- Saggio di una bibliografia algologica italiana (Accademia reale delle Scienze, Naples, 1882)
