= Neopaxillus =

Scientific classification
- Kingdom: Fungi
- Division: Basidiomycota
- Class: Agaricomycetes
- Order: Agaricales
- Family: Crepidotaceae
- Genus: Neopaxillus; Singer (1948)

Type species
- Neopaxillus echinosporus Singer (1948)

Species
- N. bryogenus N. dominicanus N. echinospermus N. echinosporus N. plumbeus N. reticulatus

Genus of fungi

Neopaxillus is a genus of fungi in the family Crepidotaceae. According to the Dictionary of the Fungi (10th edition, 2008), the family contains five species found in Central and South America; a sixth, N. dominicanus, was reported in 2011. It was formerly considered to belong in the family Serpulaceae in the order Boletales, but molecular analysis showed that Neopaxillus is better placed in the Agaricales as a sister group to Crepidotus (of the family Crepidotaceae).

== See also ==
- List of Agaricales genera
