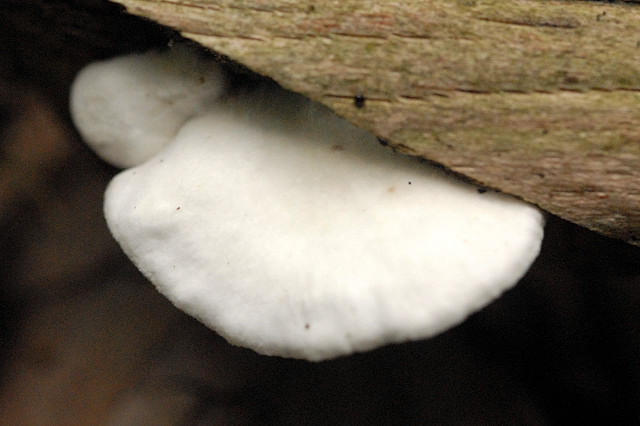

Scientific classification
- Kingdom: Fungi
- Division: Basidiomycota
- Class: Agaricomycetes
- Order: Agaricales
- Family: Crepidotaceae
- Genus: Crepidotus
- Species: C. mollis

Binomial name
- Crepidotus mollis (Schaeff.) Staude

= Crepidotus mollis =

Species of mushroom

Crepidotus mollis Mycological characteristics
- Gills on hymenium
- Cap is convex or flat
- Hymenium attachment is not applicable
- Lacks a stipe
- Spore print is brown to yellow-brown
- Ecology is saprotrophic
- Edibility is unknown or inedible

Crepidotus mollis, commonly known as the peeling oysterling, soft slipper, jelly crep, or flabby crepidotus, is a species of mushroom. It is regarded as inedible.

== Description ==
The cap is 1–5 cm wide and kidney shaped. The cap is white when it is young and when it gets older, it turns ochre. The flesh of the cap is white and flabby, and can be broken easily. It has brown fibrils and scales which wear away, leaving a smooth surface. The upper layer of the cap is elastic and can be stretched slightly at the margin. The gills are pale brown and soft. The spores are elliptical and smooth, producing a brown spore print. The stalk is rudimentary or lacking.

The species resemble a globe in moist weather. The species has a relative large size compared to other species in the genus Crepidotus. The fungus Hypomyces tremellicola is a parasite that deforms this species' cap.

=== Similar species ===
Similar species include Crepidotus applanatus, C. crocophyllus, and Pleurotus ostreatus. A key distinguishing feature is the scales, which may be lost, requiring microscopy for identification.

== Habitat and distribution ==
The species grows in groups or overlapping tiers on hardwood. The hardwood includes tree trunks, fallen branches, and sawdust. Rarely, the species grows on coniferous trees. The species is widely distributed and very common. The species can commonly be found in temperate zones of North and South America and Europe, from July to September in the northern hemisphere.

== Edibility ==
The species is reportedly inedible and possibly poisonous. It is also too small to consider worthwhile. Since very little is known about the edibility of the mushrooms in the genus Crepidotus, none should be eaten.
