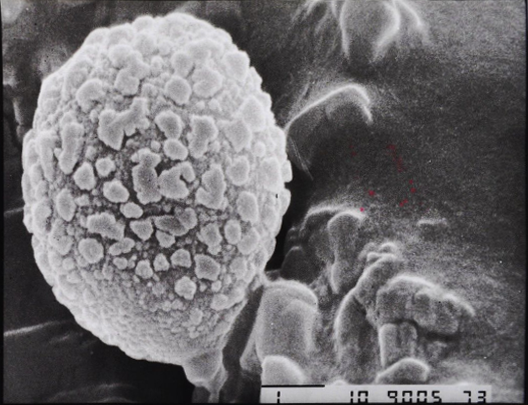
- Crepidotus carpaticus

Scientific classification
- Domain: Eukaryota
- Kingdom: Fungi
- Division: Basidiomycota
- Class: Agaricomycetes
- Order: Agaricales
- Family: Crepidotaceae
- Genus: Crepidotus
- Species: C. carpaticus

Binomial name
- Crepidotus carpaticus Pilát (Pers.) P. Kumm. 1871

Synonyms
- Crepidotus wakefieldiae Pilát,

= Crepidotus carpaticus =

Species of fungus

Crepidotus carpaticus, is a species of saprophytic fungus in the family Crepidotaceae with a stipeless sessile cap. The fungus was described by Albert Pilát in 1929 and is commonly found in France, the United Kingdom, and Ireland. The GBIF database indicates this species may be an orthographic variant.

== Identification works ==
The BioImages field guide lists the following works for identification of C. carpaticus.

- "Zottiges Krüppelfüßchen:Crepidotus carpaticus". Der Tintling (67).
- Pearson, A.A. (1952). "New Records and Observations V.". Transactions of the British Mycological Society. 35 (2): 97–122. doi:10.1016/S0007-1536(52)80017-8.
- Reid, D.A. (1965). "New or Interesting records of British Hymenomycetes. III". Transactions of the British Mycological Society. 48 (4): 513–537. doi:10.1016/S0007-1536(65)80027-4.
