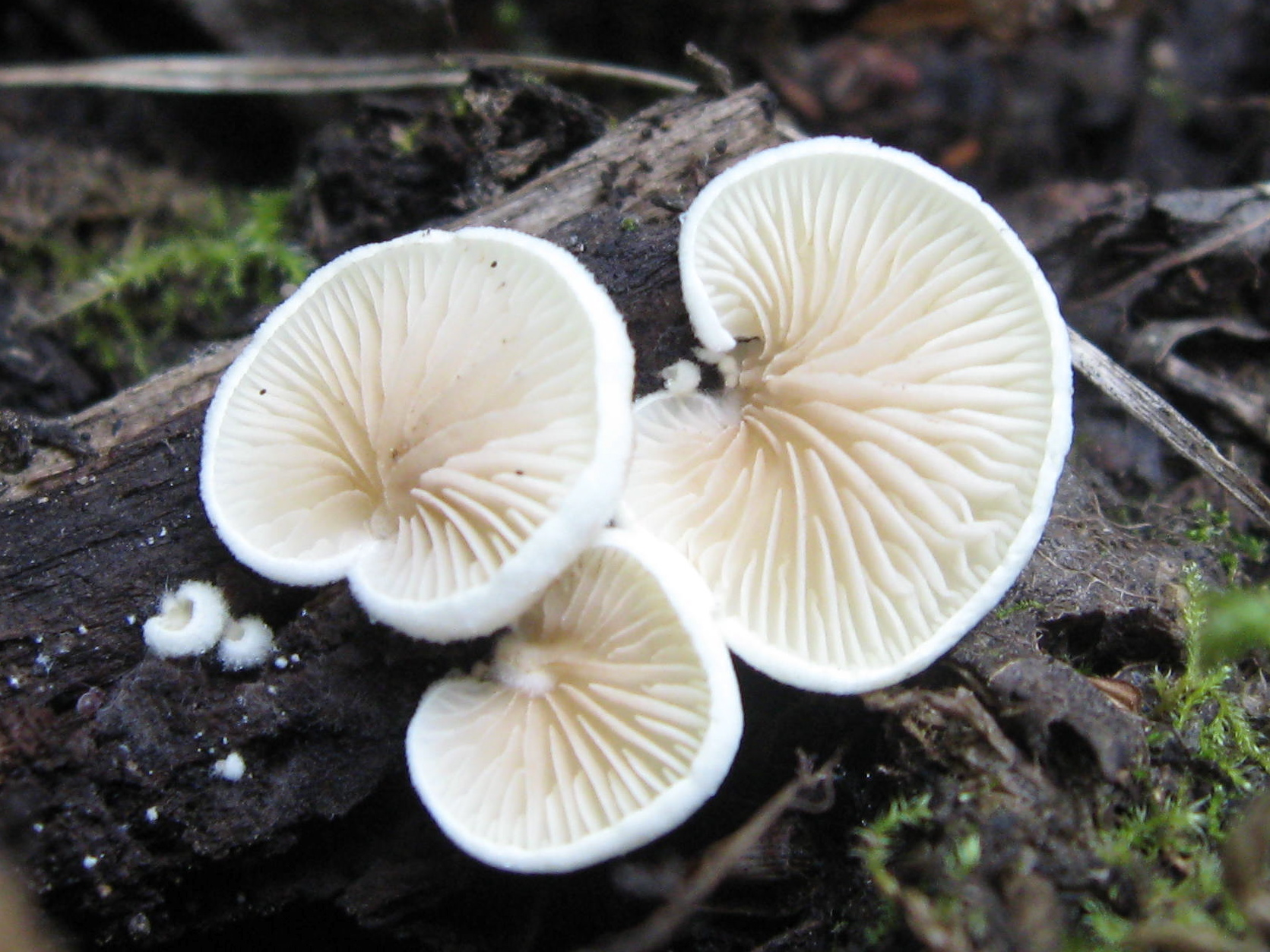
- Crepidotus versutus growing on rotten wood in northern Saskatchewan, Canada. The dense velvety layer of white hairs (actually fungal hyphae) on the outer surface is characteristic of this species.

Scientific classification
- Kingdom: Fungi
- Division: Basidiomycota
- Class: Agaricomycetes
- Order: Agaricales
- Family: Crepidotaceae
- Genus: Crepidotus
- Species: C. versutus

Binomial name
- Crepidotus versutus (Peck) Sacc.

Synonyms
- Agaricus versutus Peck; Crepidotus bresadolae Pilát; Crepidotus pubescens Bres.

= Crepidotus versutus =

Species of fungus

Crepidotus versutus Mycological characteristics
- Gills on hymenium
- Cap is convex
- Hymenium attachment is not applicable
- Lacks a stipe
- Spore print is reddish-brown
- Ecology is saprotrophic
- Edibility is unknown

Crepidotus versutus, commonly known as the evasive agaric, is a species of fungus in the family Crepidotaceae. It is saprobic on wood, like other Crepidotus species, but it can also decompose herbaceous forest litter. The species is characterized by large, punctate, ellipsoid spores, and the white, hairy pileus.

The specific epithet versutus is derived from the Latin word versut (clever), which may be a reference to the ability of the fungus to correctly orient itself for growth depending on the position of its growing surface. The basionym of this species is Agaricus versutus Peck 1878. Older, obsolete synonyms include Crepidotus bresadolae and Crepidotus pubescens.

== Description ==
The pileus is typically 5–14 mm in diameter, initially resupinate, then later turned up. It is attached dorsally or laterally to the substrate. Fan- or kidney-shaped, it is dry, white, and covered with a layer of soft hairs which may or may not be matted. The outer edge is rolled slightly inwards. The context is thin, soft, and white. Both the odor and taste of this mushroom are mild.

The gills radiate from an eccentric or lateral point of attachment, medium broad, and tend to swell in the middle. The gill spacing is sub-distant, with many short gills (lamellulae) that do not reach the attachment point. The gills are initially white, then later tinged a rusty-brown color. The spore print is cinnamon-brown in color.

This species has no stipe, although it may have a small tubercle attaching it to its growing surface.

=== Microscopic features ===
The basidiospores are 7–11 x 4.5–6 μm in size, ellipsoid in shape, marked with very small spots, and yellowish to yellowish-brown under microscopic view. Basidia are 27–32 x 6–7 μm and 4-spored. Pleurocystidia are absent. The cheilocystidia are 22–63 x 3–12 μm, cylindric, and either swelling in the middle, or bottle-shaped. The gill trama are interwoven or at times subparallel, the hyphae 4–7 μm in diameter. The generative tissue below the hymenium (subhymenium) is arranged in a parallel fashion. The cuticle (the outer layer of the fruiting body) is made of dense interwoven hyphae, connected to a tuft of colorless, long, slender (2.5–5 μm diameter) hyphae. There are no clamp connections in the epicuticular hyphae, but there are on the hyphae of the tomentum at the base of the pileus.

(Description adapted from Hesler & Smith, 1965)

== Habitat and distribution ==
This species may usually be found on the bark of deciduous wood in damp, shaded places. In the Pacific Northwest, it is known to grow on Abies, Acer and Populus trees.

== Similar species ==
Crepidotus applanatus, the so-called "flat crep", is larger, with a shell-shaped cap, more closely spaced gills, and has conspicuous white mycelial threads at the point of attachment. C. herbarum has smaller spores and a pale-yellowish spore print.
