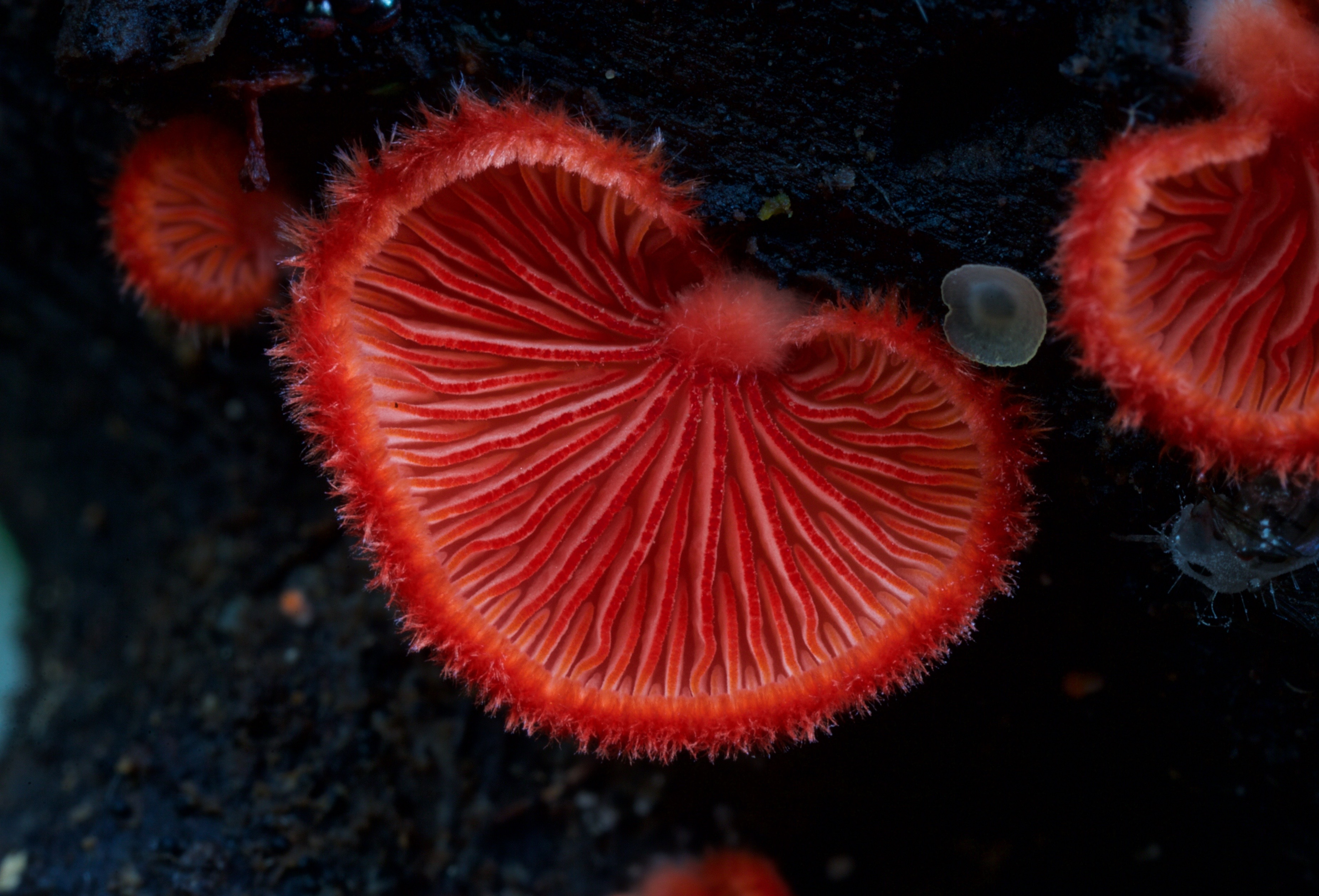
- Crepidotus cinnabarinus

Scientific classification
- Domain: Eukaryota
- Kingdom: Fungi
- Division: Basidiomycota
- Class: Agaricomycetes
- Order: Agaricales
- Family: Crepidotaceae
- Genus: Crepidotus
- Species: C. cinnabarinus

Binomial name
- Crepidotus cinnabarinus Peck 1895

Synonyms
- Crepidotus decurrens

= Crepidotus cinnabarinus =

Species of fungus

Crepidotus cinnabarinus is a species of saprophytic fungus in the family Crepidotaceae with a stipeless sessile cap distributed in North America and Europe. It is highly conspicuous and often found on fallen branches and rotting trunks of broad leafed trees. In England it appears from late summer to autumn.

== Description ==
- Cap: Bright orangish red, the cap (pileus) of C. cinnabarinus is generally about 2 to 18mm in diameter and is convex, shell or fan shaped with a finely down felted surface when fresh, especially at its base, becoming minutely pitted or more or less bald and dry. The margin is irregular to fibrous and initially inrolled.
- Stipe (stem): Absent, but a pale, lateral pseudostem is sometimes present.
- Gills: Coloured pale brown with a red-orange edge, are crowded and adnexed.
- Spores: The spore print is buff. Spore shape is broadly elliptical to subspherical with a finely spiny to warty surface, measuring 8-8.5–8.5

× 5.5–6/5 μm in size.

- Absent features- No annulus (ring).

Mycological characteristics
- Gills on hymenium
- Cap is convex
- Hymenium is adnexed
- Lacks a stipe
- Spore print is buff
- Ecology is saprotrophic
- Edibility is inedible
