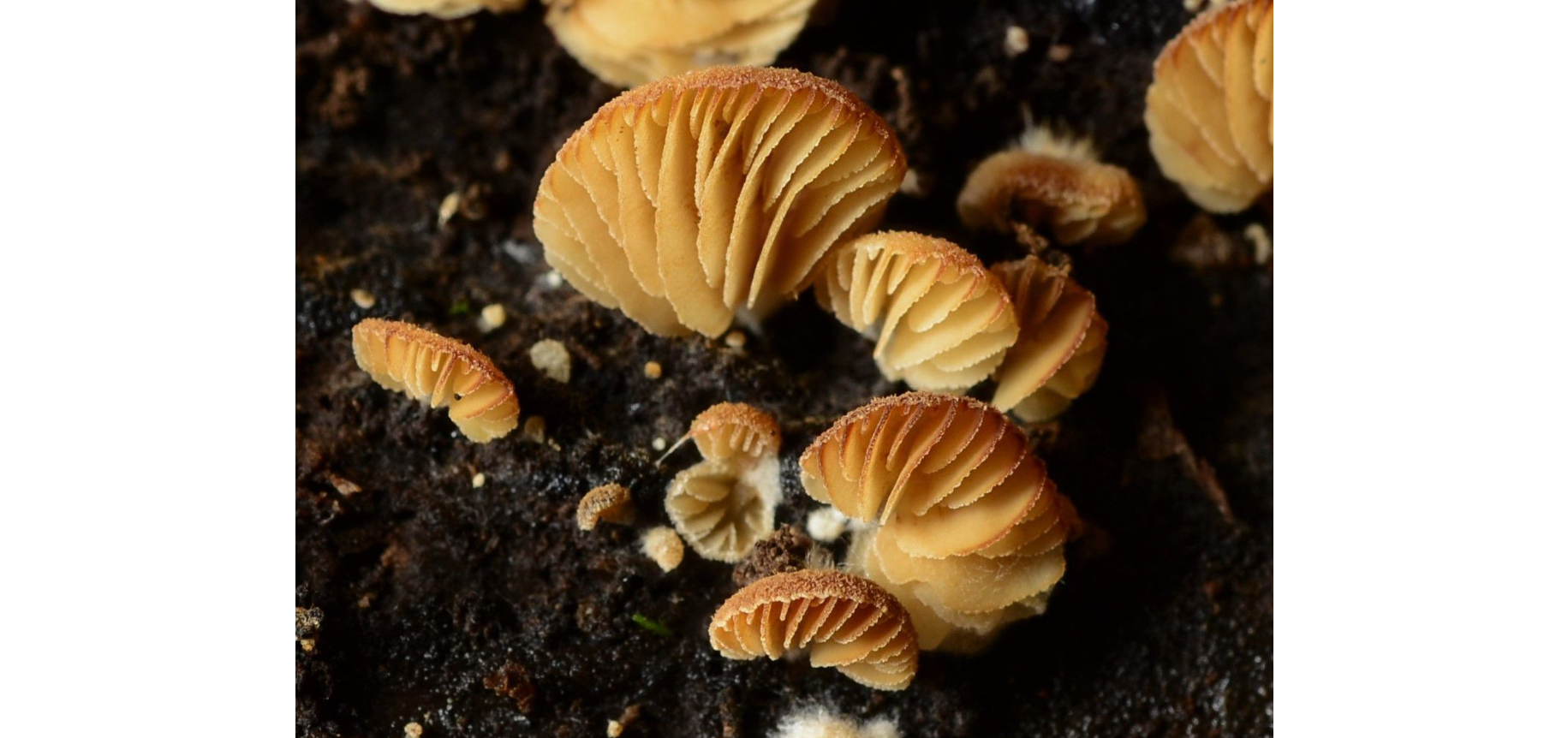
- Crepidotus brunnescens

Scientific classification
- Domain: Eukaryota
- Kingdom: Fungi
- Division: Basidiomycota
- Class: Agaricomycetes
- Order: Agaricales
- Family: Crepidotaceae
- Genus: Crepidotus
- Species: C. brunnescens

Binomial name
- Crepidotus brunnescens Hesler & A.H.Sm.

= Crepidotus brunnescens =

Species of fungus

Crepidotus brunnescens, is a species of saprophytic fungus in the family Crepidotaceae with a stipeless sessile cap which is smooth and yellowish-brown. It is often found on hardwood logs such as Quercus.

== Description ==
Caps with a basal tomentum. Odor not distinctive. Clamps present in the pileipellis and the lamellar trama. Cheilocystidia is hyaline and capitate. Basidia have four sterigmata. Spores brown, thick-walled, apparently smooth and subglobose. Spores: (5.4) 5.6 – 6.2 (6.8) × (4.9) 5.1 – 5.7 (6.2) μm.
