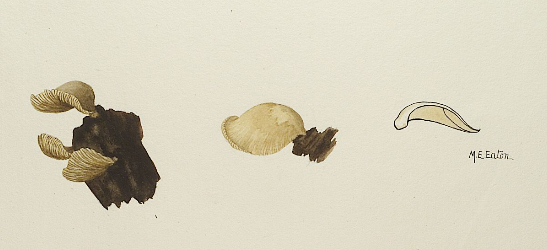

Scientific classification
- Domain: Eukaryota
- Kingdom: Fungi
- Division: Basidiomycota
- Class: Agaricomycetes
- Order: Agaricales
- Family: Crepidotaceae
- Genus: Crepidotus
- Species: C. albescens

Binomial name
- Crepidotus albescens (Murrill) Redhead

Synonyms
- Pleurotus albescens (Murrill); Geopetalum albescens

= Crepidotus albescens =

Species of fungus

Crepidotus albescens is a species of saprophytic fungus in the family Crepidotaceae with a stipeless sessile cap.

== Description ==
Crepidotus albescens is distinguished by its remarkably elongate cheilocystidia which is subcylindric to more or less narrowly flask shaped (lageniform). The pileipellis is made up of filamentous, undifferentiated terminal elements.
