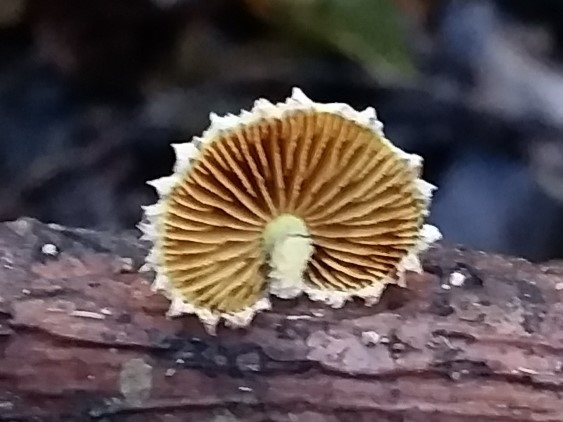
- Pleuroflammula praestans

Scientific classification
- Domain: Eukaryota
- Kingdom: Fungi
- Division: Basidiomycota
- Class: Agaricomycetes
- Order: Agaricales
- Family: Crepidotaceae
- Genus: Pleuroflammula; Singer

Type species
- Pleuroflammula dussii (Pat.) Singer

= Pleuroflammula =

Genus of fungi

Pleuroflammula is a genus of fungi in the family Crepidotaceae. The genus contains ten species found in America and Asia.
