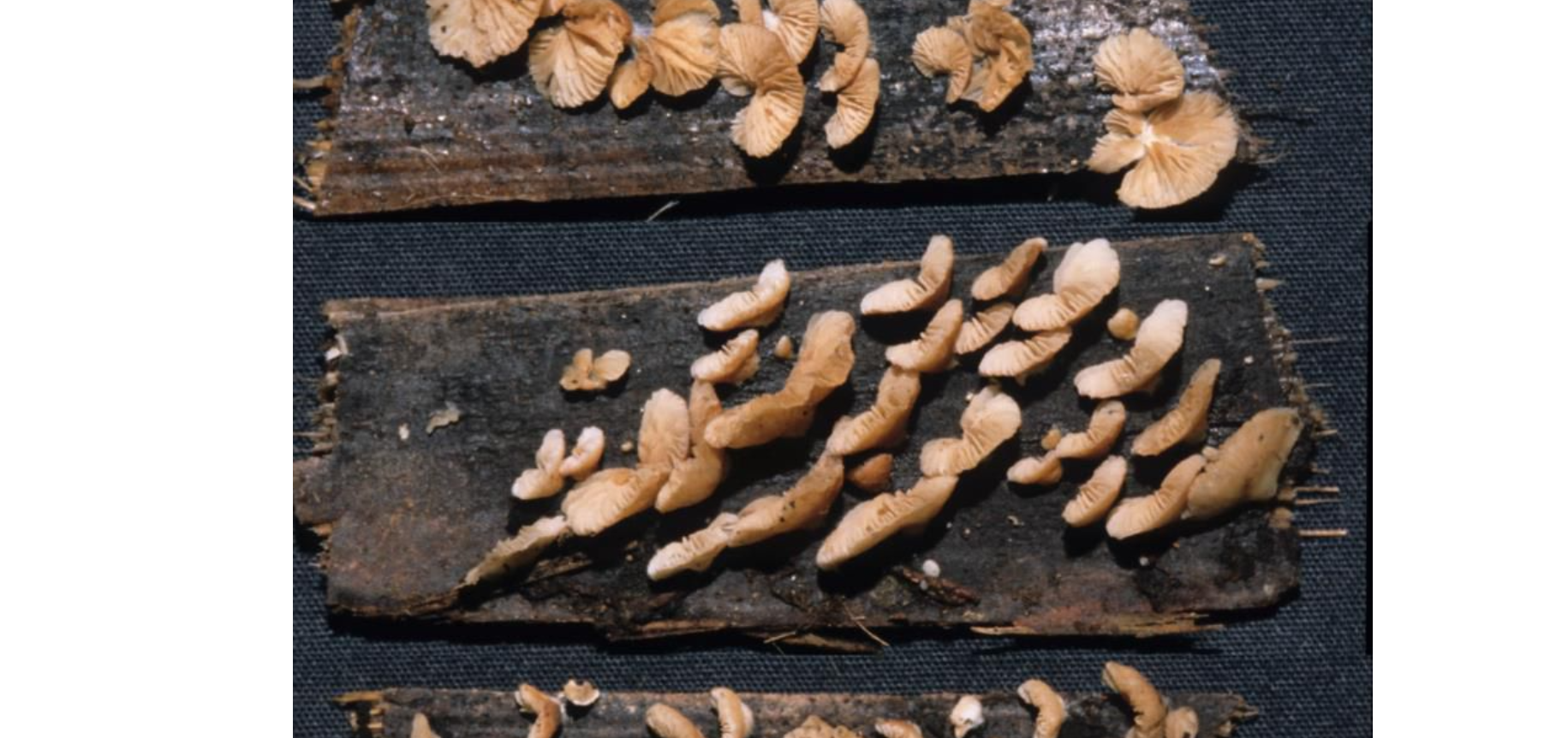
- Crepidotus affinis

Scientific classification
- Domain: Eukaryota
- Kingdom: Fungi
- Division: Basidiomycota
- Class: Agaricomycetes
- Order: Agaricales
- Family: Crepidotaceae
- Genus: Crepidotus
- Species: C. affinis

Binomial name
- Crepidotus affinis E. Horak. In: CBS Biodiversity Series 16: 17. (2018).

= Crepidotus affinis =

Species of fungus

Crepidotus affinis is a species of saprophytic fungus in the family Crepidotaceae with a stipeless sessile cap. The fungus was described by Egon Horak in 2018 and has been found in New Zealand, Panama, and the Philippines.

== Description ==
Crepidotus affinis has a similar gross morphology with C. exilis, though it has larger basidiospores and clavate cheilocystidia with a small capitate apex. The cap is fan shaped (flabelliform) with a straight margin. Colour is light brown becoming lighter towards the margin with a fine grained wrinkled (rugulose) surface.

== Bibliography ==
- Horak, Egon (2018). Fungi of New Zealand. Volume 6: Agaricales (Basidiomycota) of New Zealand (e-book ed.).
- Brown spored genera p.p. Crepidotus, Flammulaster, Inocybe, Phaeocollybia, Phaeomarasmius, Pleuroflammula, Pyrrhoglossum, Simocybe, Tubaria and Tympanella. Fungi of New Zealand Nga Hekaheka o Aotearoa Volume 6. Utrecht, The Netherlands: Westerdijk Fungal Biodiversity Institute.
