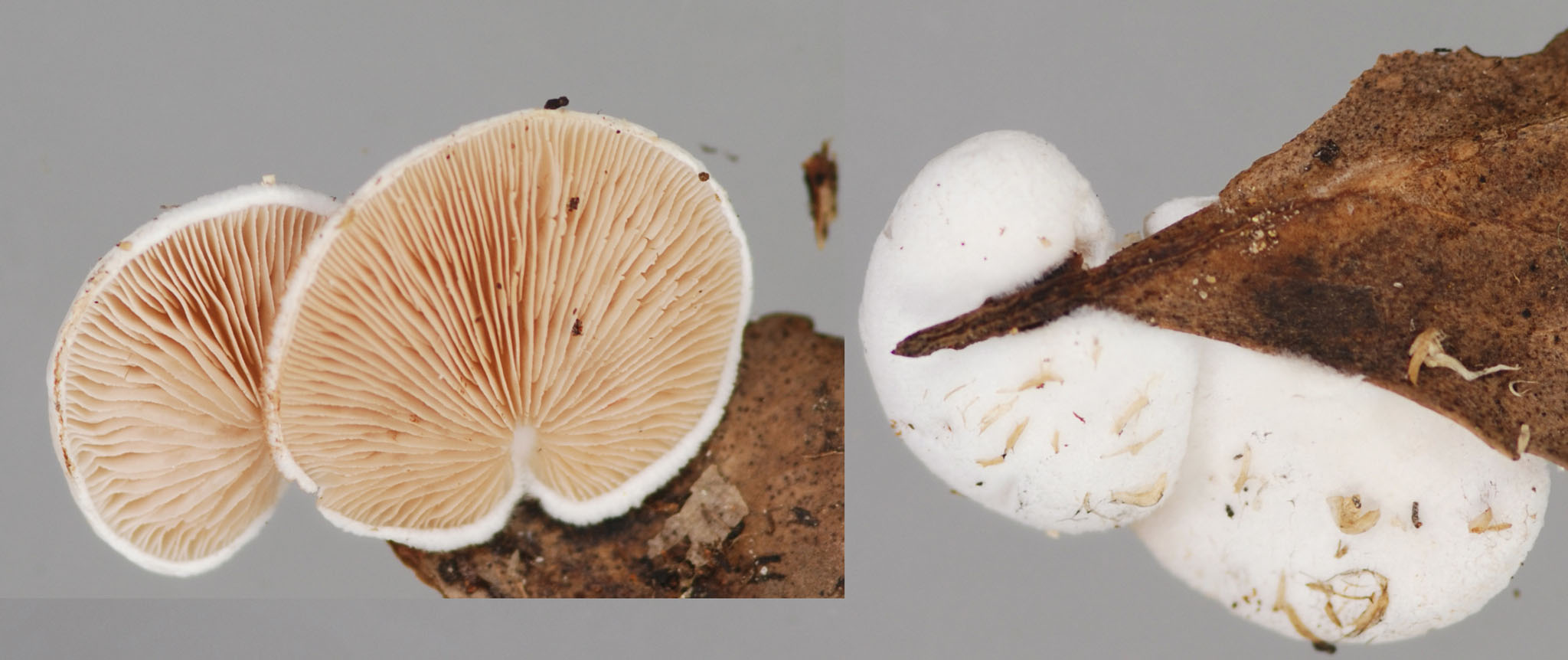

Scientific classification
- Domain: Eukaryota
- Kingdom: Fungi
- Division: Basidiomycota
- Class: Agaricomycetes
- Order: Agaricales
- Family: Crepidotaceae
- Genus: Crepidotus
- Species: C. albolanatus

Binomial name
- Crepidotus albolanatus E.Horak

= Crepidotus albolanatus =

Species of fungus

Crepidotus albolanatus, is a species of saprophytic fungus in the family Crepidotaceae with a stipeless sessile finely felted cap. Colour is pure white, cap diameter 10–35 mm and has been found in New Zealand on the debris of the nikau palm (Rhopalostylis sapida).
