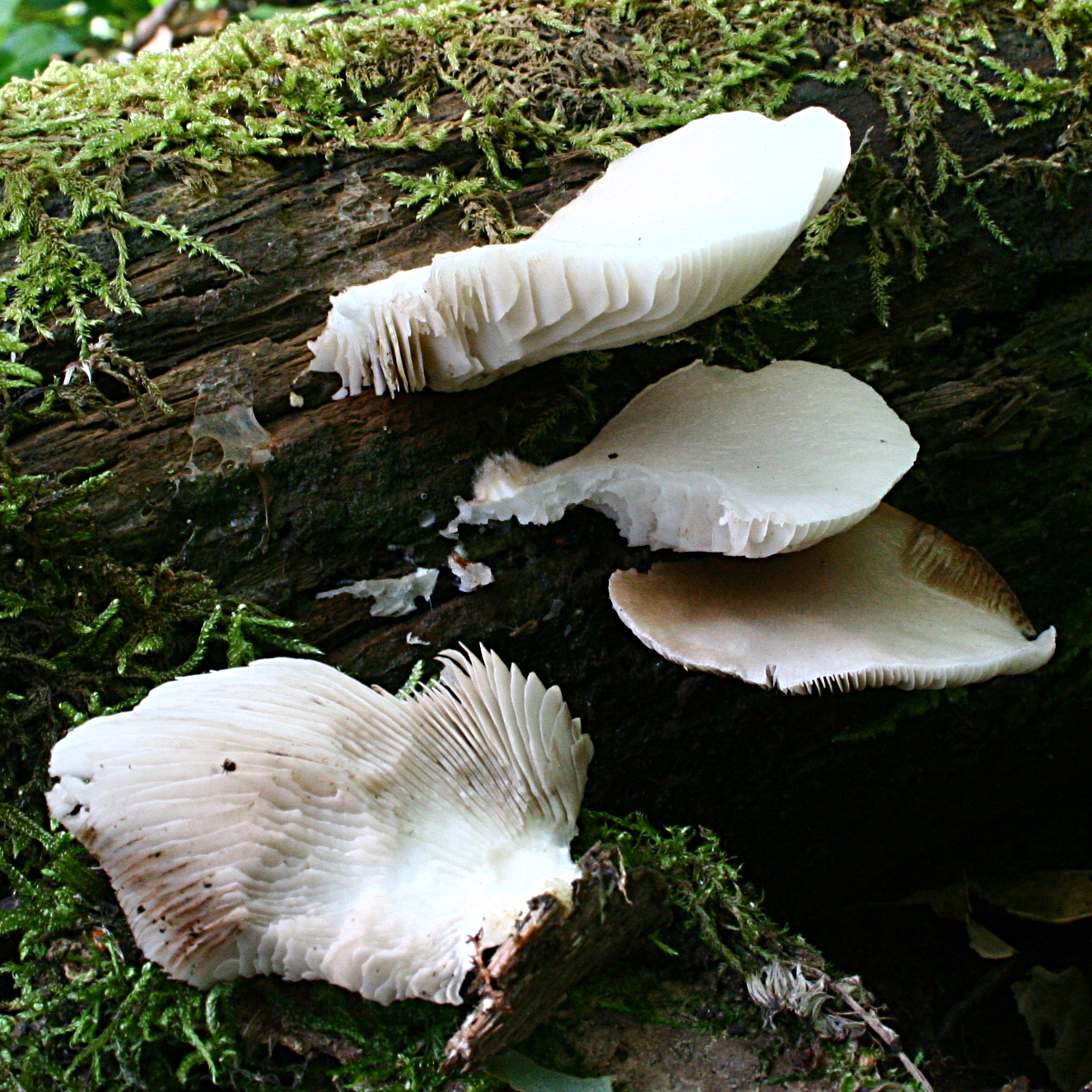

Scientific classification
- Kingdom: Fungi
- Division: Basidiomycota
- Class: Agaricomycetes
- Order: Agaricales
- Family: Crepidotaceae
- Genus: Crepidotus
- Species: C. applanatus

Binomial name
- Crepidotus applanatus (Pers.) P.Kumm.

Synonyms
- Agaricus applanatus Pers.

= Crepidotus applanatus =

Species of fungus

Crepidotus applanatus is a species of fungus in the family Crepidotaceae. It was first described in 1796 by Christiaan Hendrik Persoon and renamed by Paul Kummer in 1871.

== Description ==
It grows on deciduous wood, to which it is attached at the side by at most only a rudimentary stem (it is "pleurotoid"). The cap grows up to 4 centimetres (1 1/2 in) wide and is hygrophanous, white to ochraceous when damp and drying whitish. The spores, around 5–6 μm, are almost spherical and warty. It has a brown spore print.

There are many lookalikes. It is distinguished from the very similar Crepidotus stenocystis by the shape of the cheilocystidia (clavate and unbranched) and the habitat on broad-leaf timber.

== Inedibility ==
It is inedible.

Crepidotus applanatus
- Mycological characteristics
- Gills on hymenium
- Hymenium attachment is not applicable
- Lacks a stipe
- Spore print is brown
- Ecology is parasitic
- Edibility is inedible
