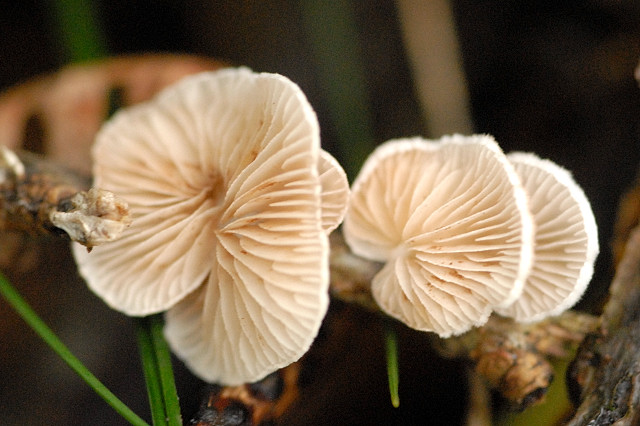

Scientific classification
- Kingdom: Fungi
- Division: Basidiomycota
- Class: Agaricomycetes
- Order: Agaricales
- Family: Crepidotaceae
- Genus: Crepidotus
- Species: C. variabilis

Binomial name
- Crepidotus variabilis (Pers.) P. Kumm. 1871

Synonyms
- Agaricus albidus Balb., (1804); Agaricus variabilis Pers., 1794; Claudopus variabilis (Pers.) 1876; Dochmiopus variabilis (Pers.) 1887; Hyporrhodius variabilis (Pers.) 1898; Octojuga variabilis (Pers.) 1889

= Crepidotus variabilis =

Species of fungus

Crepidotus variabilis
- Mycological characteristics
- Gills on hymenium
- Cap is convex
- Hymenium is free
- Lacks a stipe
- Spore print is buff to pink
- Ecology is saprotrophic
- Edibility is unknown

Crepidotus variabilis is a species of saprophytic fungi in the family Crepidotaceae. It is commonly known as a variable oysterling in the United Kingdom and is seen there in autumn. May occur solitary, but more often in small scattered groups from summer to autumn on twigs and other woody debris of broad-leaved trees. Very common but often confused with Crepidotus cesatii.

== Description ==
- Cap: The cap (pileus) of C. variabilis is generally about 0.5 to 2 cm in diameter is white and emerges kidney shaped soon becoming irregular and wavy forming patches of overlapping fruit bodies. The surface is very finely downy to velvety with a more or less smooth margin.
- Gills: On the underside, the gills (lamellae) appear somewhat fringed and are classified as free with no stipe to connect to. The colour of the gills depends on maturity ranging from off-white when young to ochraceous flesh-coloured as the spores mature.
- Spores: The spore print is pinkish-buff, reflecting the colour of the gills. The ellipsoid-shaped basidiospore of C. variabilis are 5–7 by 3–3.5 μm in size.
- Absent features: No stipe (stem) or annulus (ring).
