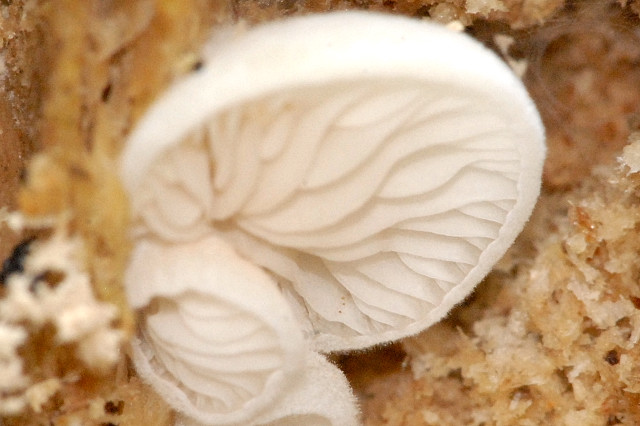

Scientific classification
- Domain: Eukaryota
- Kingdom: Fungi
- Division: Basidiomycota
- Class: Agaricomycetes
- Order: Agaricales
- Family: Crepidotaceae
- Genus: Crepidotus
- Species: C. cesatii

Binomial name
- Crepidotus cesatii (Sacc. 1877)

Synonyms
- Agaricus variabilis var.'sphaerosporus; Crepidotus sphaerosporus; Dochmiopus sphaerosporus

= Crepidotus cesatii =

Species of fungus

Crepidotus cesatii, commonly known as the roundspored oysterling, is a species of saprophytic fungus in the family Crepidotaceae with a stipeless sessile cap. It is often found on woody and herbaceous plant debris from many different hosts including conifers, appearing from late summer to winter usually in small scattered groups. Often confused with Crepidotus variabilis, it can be distinguished by its different spores.

== Description ==
- Cap: The cap (pileus) of C. variabilis is generally about 0.4 to 2 cm in diameter is white and emerges kidney shaped soon becoming irregular and wavy forming patches of overlapping fruit bodies. The surface is very finely downy to velvety with a margin more or less inrolled.
- Gills: Colour is whitish, then buff-brown with pink flush, fairly distant, decurrent to base.
- Spores: The spore print is pinkish-buff, more pink than C. variabilis. Their shape is subspherical and minutely warty, measuring 6.5–8.5 × 5–7 μm in size.
- Absent features: No stipe (stem) or annulus (ring).

Crepidotus cesatii Mycological characteristics
- Gills on hymenium
- No distinct cap
- Hymenium attachment is not applicable
- Lacks a stipe
- Spore print is buff
- Ecology is saprotrophic

== Bibliography ==
- Saccardo, P.A. 1887. Sylloge Hymenomycetum, Vol. I. Agaricineae. Sylloge Fungorum. 5:1-1146
