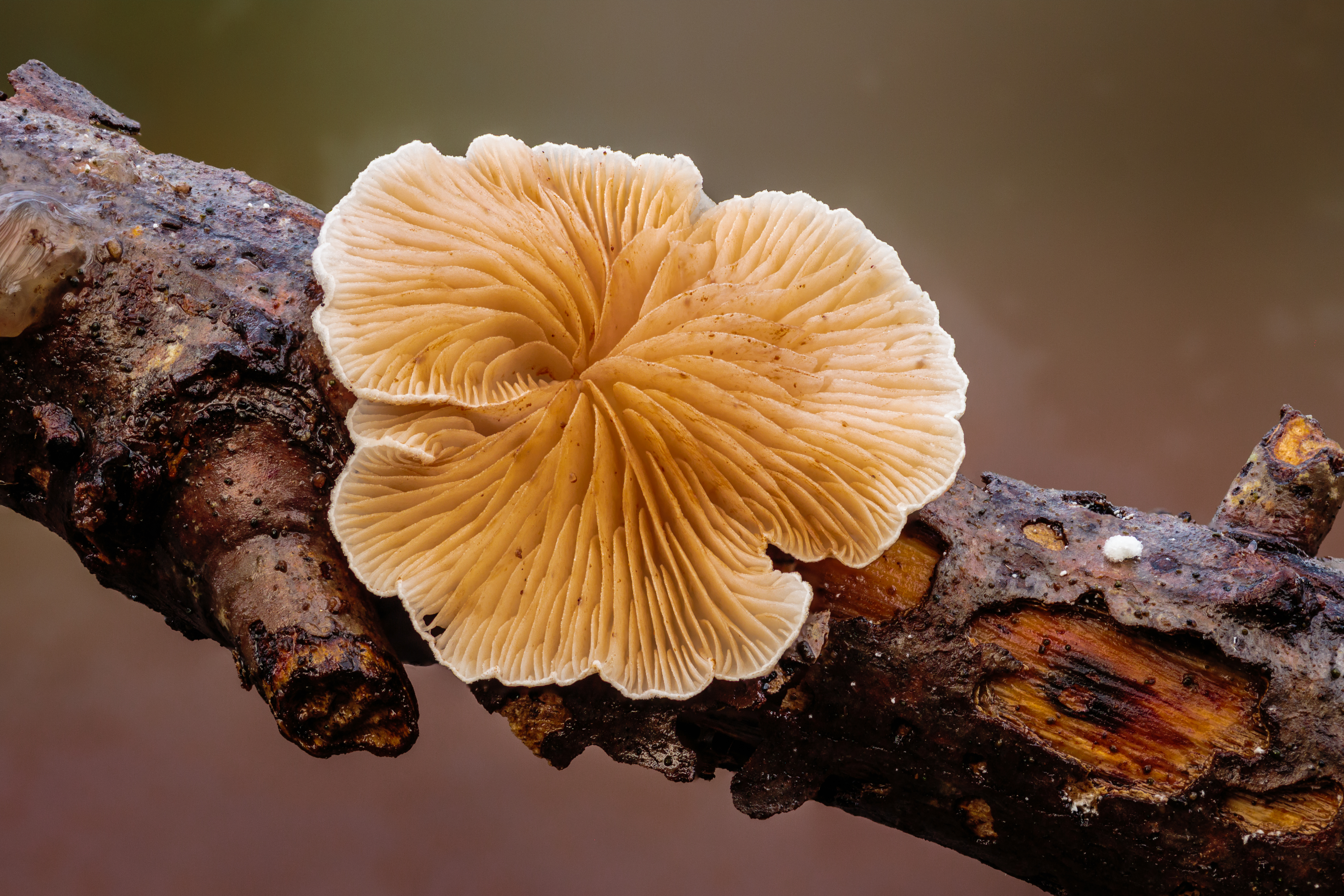
- Crepidotus variabilis

Scientific classification
- Kingdom: Fungi
- Division: Basidiomycota
- Class: Agaricomycetes
- Order: Agaricales
- Family: Crepidotaceae
- Genus: Crepidotus (Fr.) Staude

Type species
- Crepidotus mollis (Schaeff.) Staude

Synonyms
- List: Phialocybe P.Karst. (1879); Calathinus Quél. (1886); Dochmiopus Pat. (1887); Octojuga Fayod (1889); Pleurotellus Fayod (1889); Tremellopsis Pat. (1903); Tremellastrum Clem. (1909); Pellidiscus Donk (1959)

= Crepidotus =

Genus of fungi

Crepidotus is a genus of fungi in the family Crepidotaceae. Species of Crepidotus all have small, convex to fan-shaped sessile caps and grow on wood or plant debris. The genus has been studied extensively, and monographs of the North American, European, and Neotropical species have been published.

== Taxonomy ==
Elias Magnus Fries first circumscribed Crepidotus in 1821 as a tribe in the genus Agaricus, although he later (1836–1838) revised his concept. In 1857, Staude elevated Tribus Crepidotus to a genus, with Agaricus mollis (Schaeff) as the type species. Early descriptions of the genus contained between six and forty-six species, depending on the author.

In 1947, Rolf Singer wrote a monograph about the genus, and unlike prior treatments, used microscopic characters to help delineate infrageneric (i.e., below genus-level classification) relationships. Based on his revisions, the genus included 30 species. Soon after, Pilát (1950) extended Singer's monograph, including additional species to bring the total species to 75. However, many of his Crepidotus taxa would later be transferred to other genera. Currently, over 320 species are accepted.

=== Phylogeny ===
Modern phylogenetic analysis using sequencing data from the 28S rRNA gene region shows that Crepidotus is monophyletic, and that Singer's original concept for the genus may be too narrowly defined. This research showed that a natural evolutionary lineage results if some Pleurotellus species and several taxa formerly aligned with Melanomphalia are included in the generic description.

=== Species ===
Historically, many species of the genus Crepidotus have been described due to differences in single morphological character traits. Phylogenetic analysis is showing that these morphological differences are often due to phenotypic plasticity—species may adapt to different environments by assuming variations in growth forms. Recent taxonomic revisions have shown that several species formerly considered unique are conspecific. Further study is required to more accurately delineate infrageneric relationships in this taxa.

==== Selected species ====
- C. affinis
- C. albescens
- C. albolanatus
- C. applanatus – "flat crep"
- C. brunnescens
- C. carpaticus
- C. cesatii
- C. cinnabarinus
- C. epibryus
- C. mollis – "soft crepidotus", "soft slipper toadstool"
- C. praecipuus
- C. variabilis
- C. versutus – "evasive agaric"

=== Etymology ===
Crepidotus means 'cracked ear' in Latin.

== Description ==
Members of this genus are small, convex to fan-shaped, and sessile. Species have cheilocystidia Spore prints are yellow-brown to brown. All species of Crepidotus are known to be secondary decomposers of plant matter; most are saprobic on wood. Little is known about the edibility of various species; the usually small and insubstantial specimens discourage mycophagy.

== Distribution ==
Crepidotus species are cosmopolitan in distribution, and are well-documented from the northern temperate and South American regions.

== Gallery ==
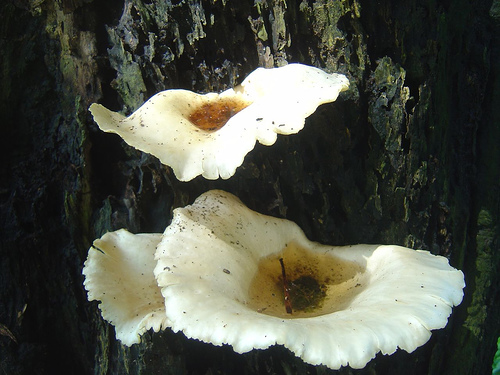
C. applanatus

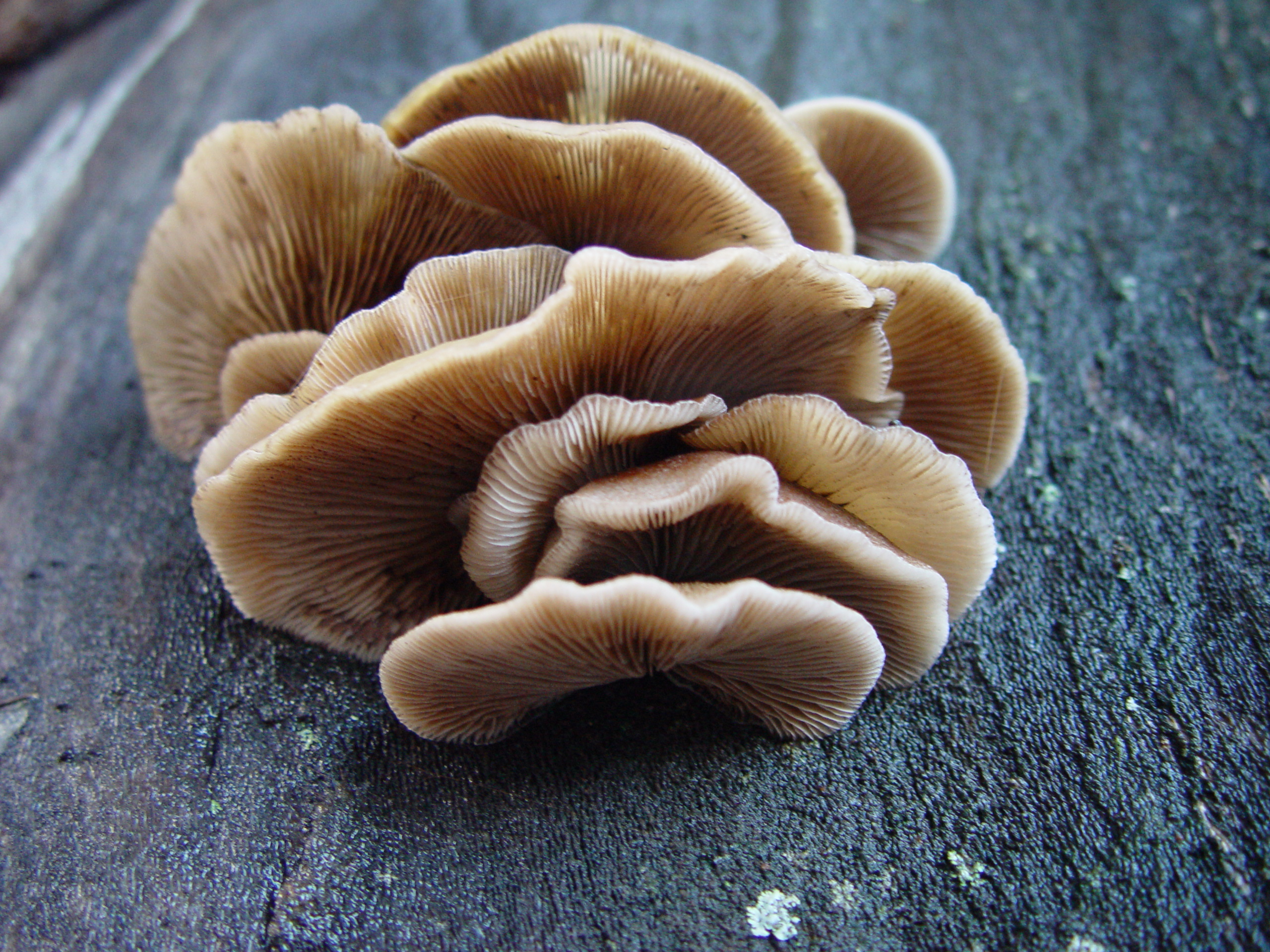
C. calolepis

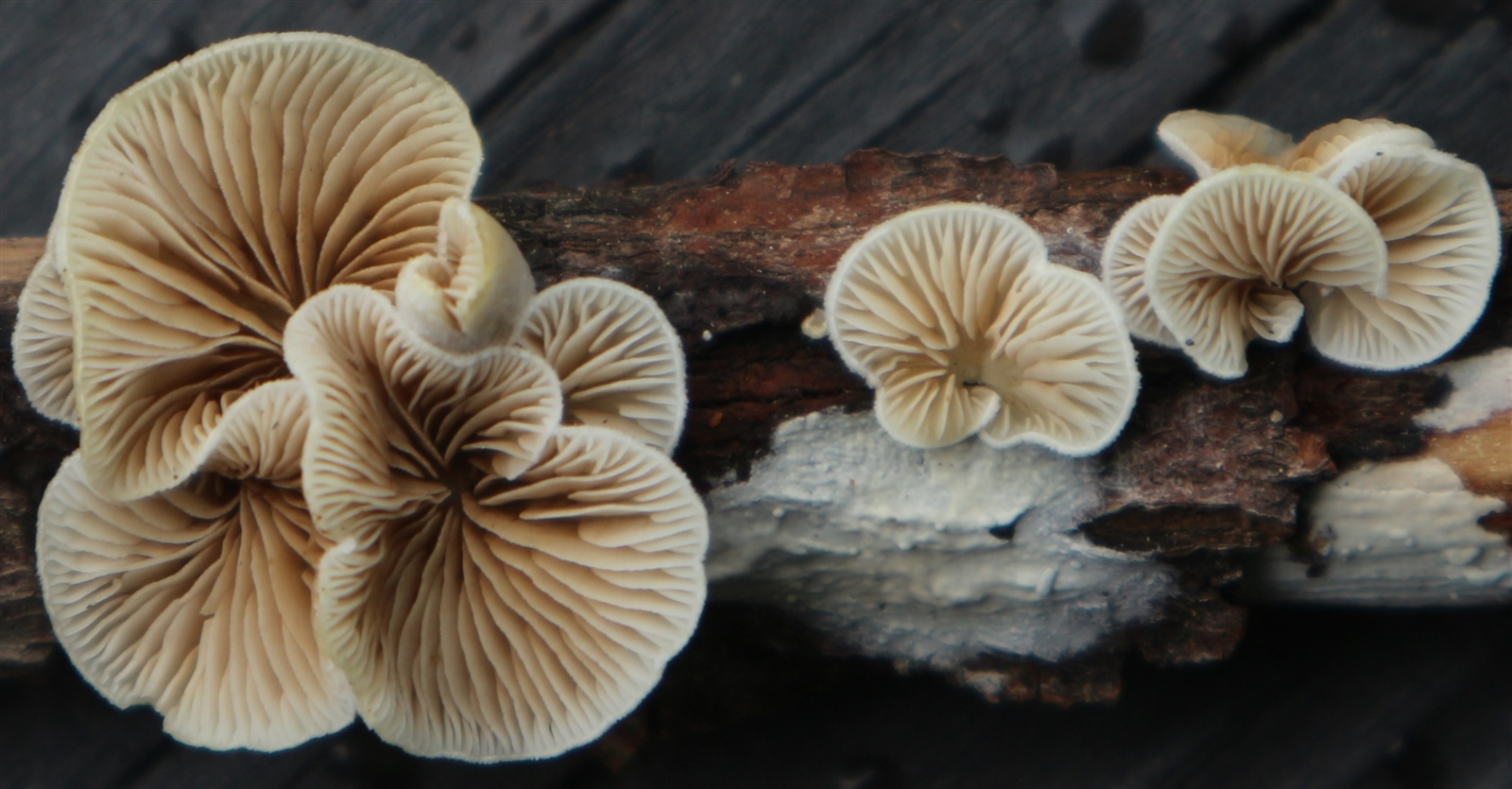
C. caspari

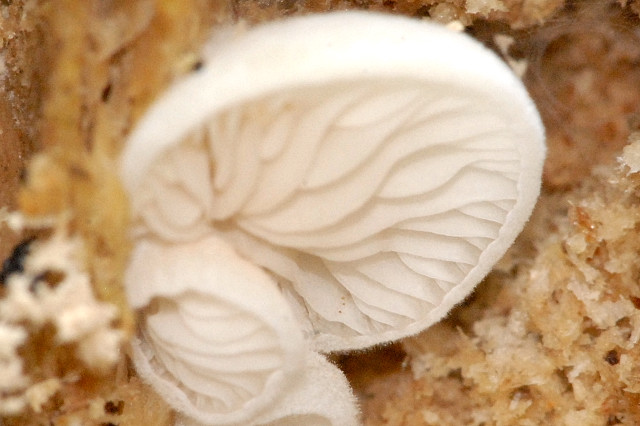
C. cesatii

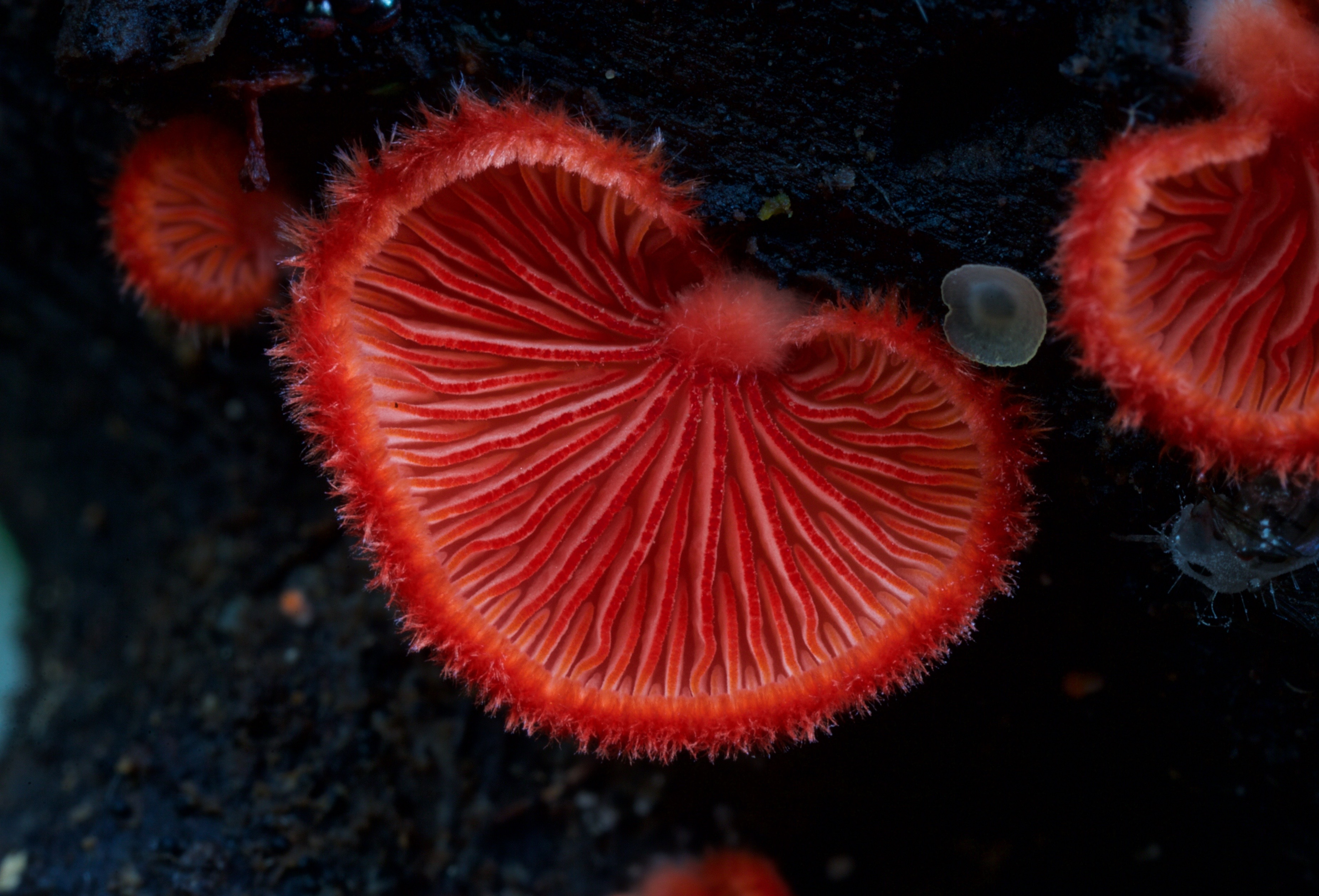
C. cinnabarinus

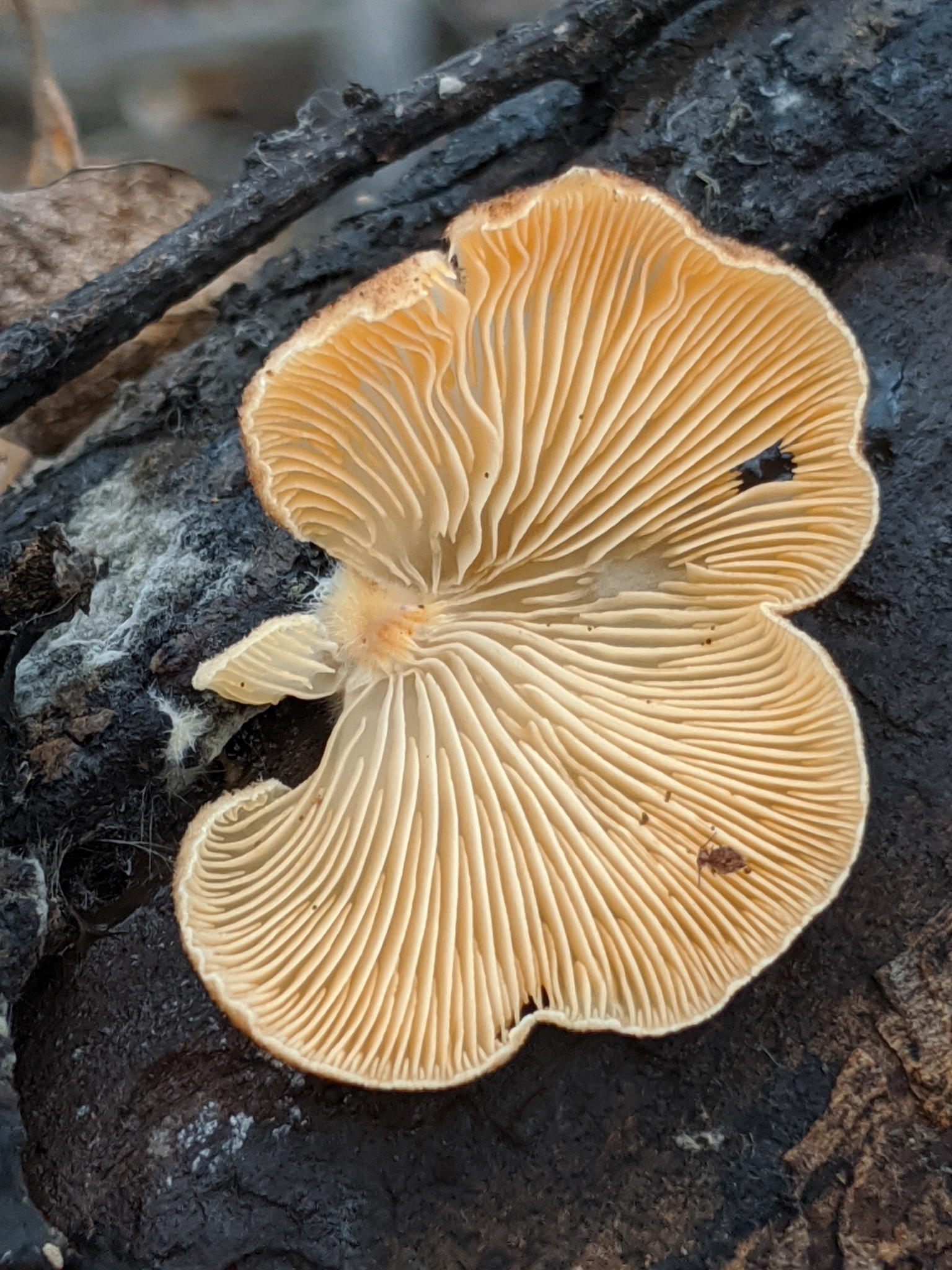
C. crocophyllus

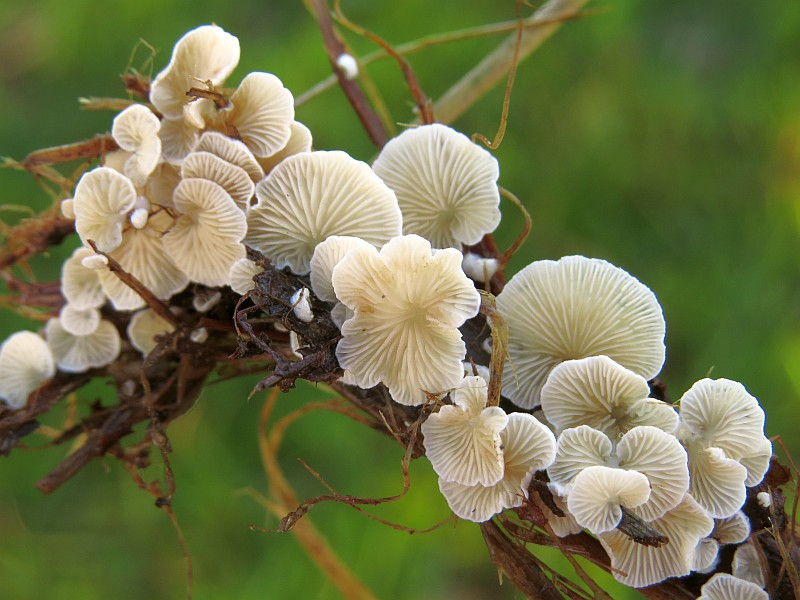
C. epibryus

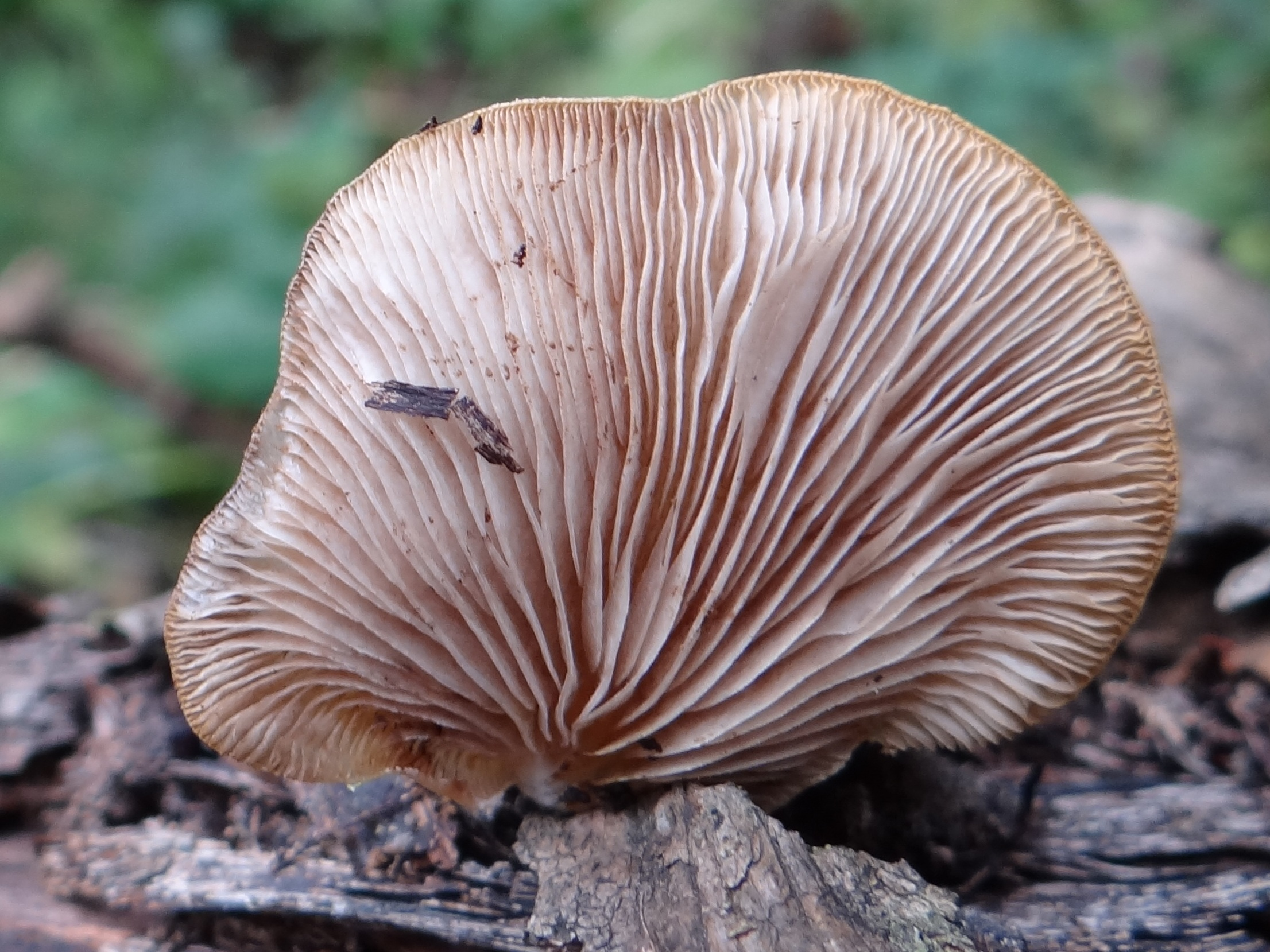
C. luteolus

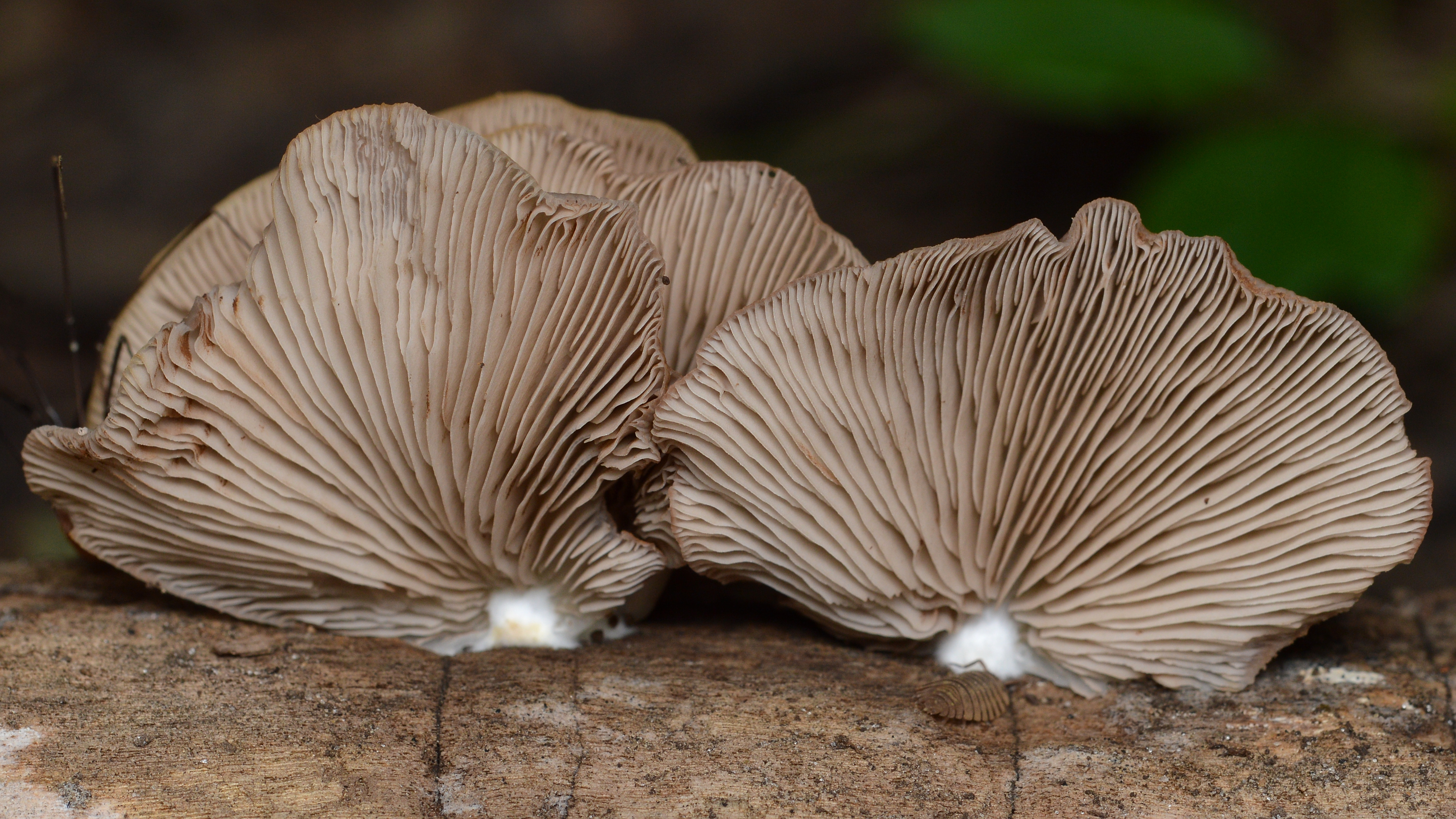
C. malachius

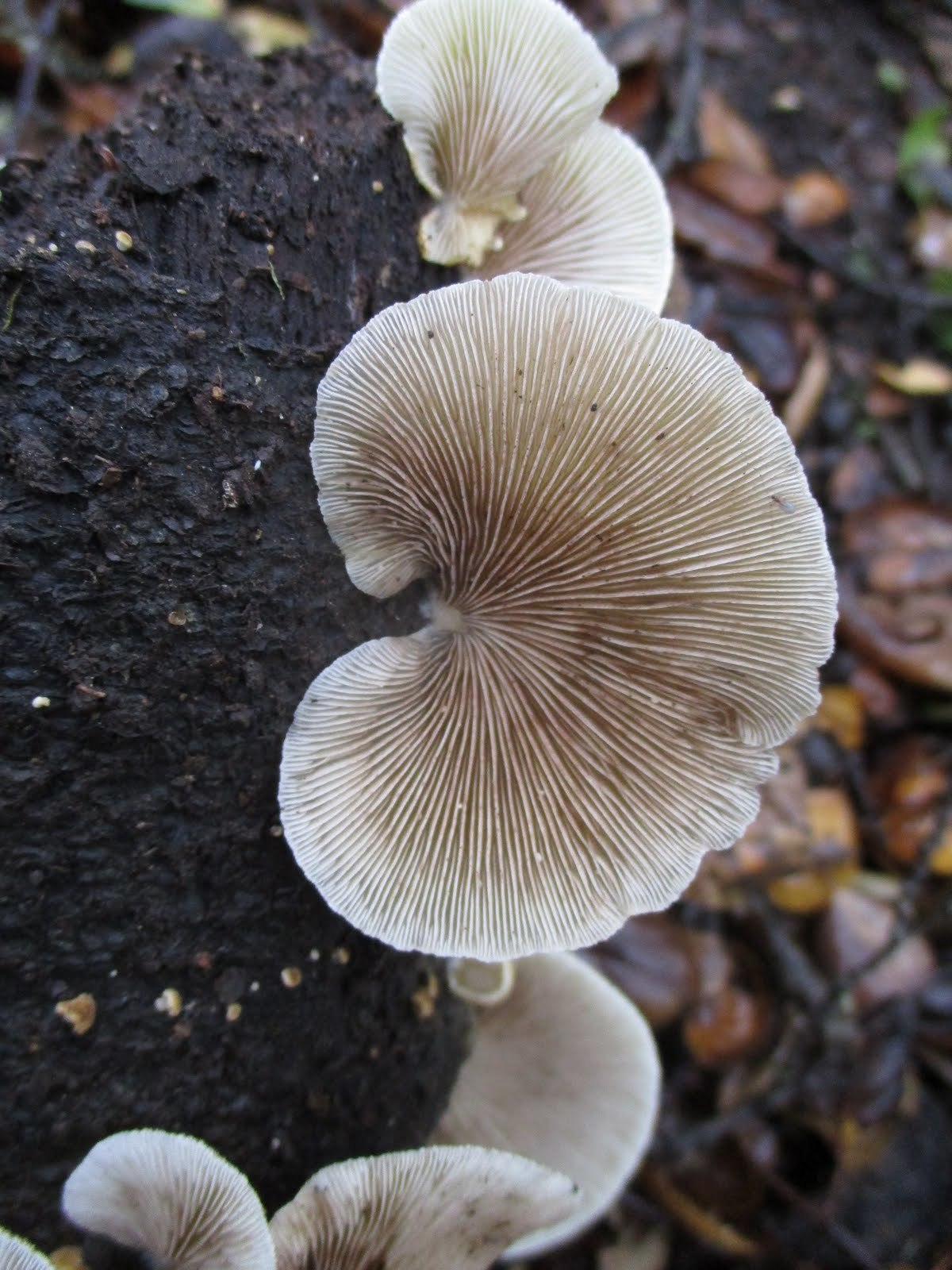
C. mollis

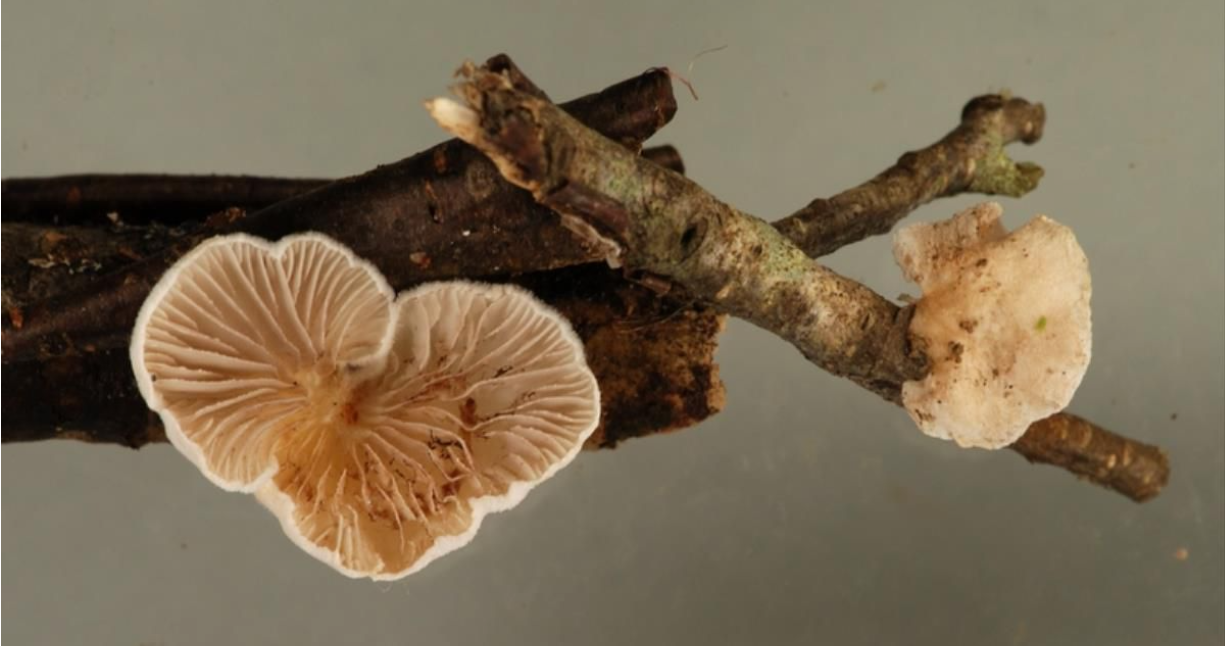
C. novae-zelandiae

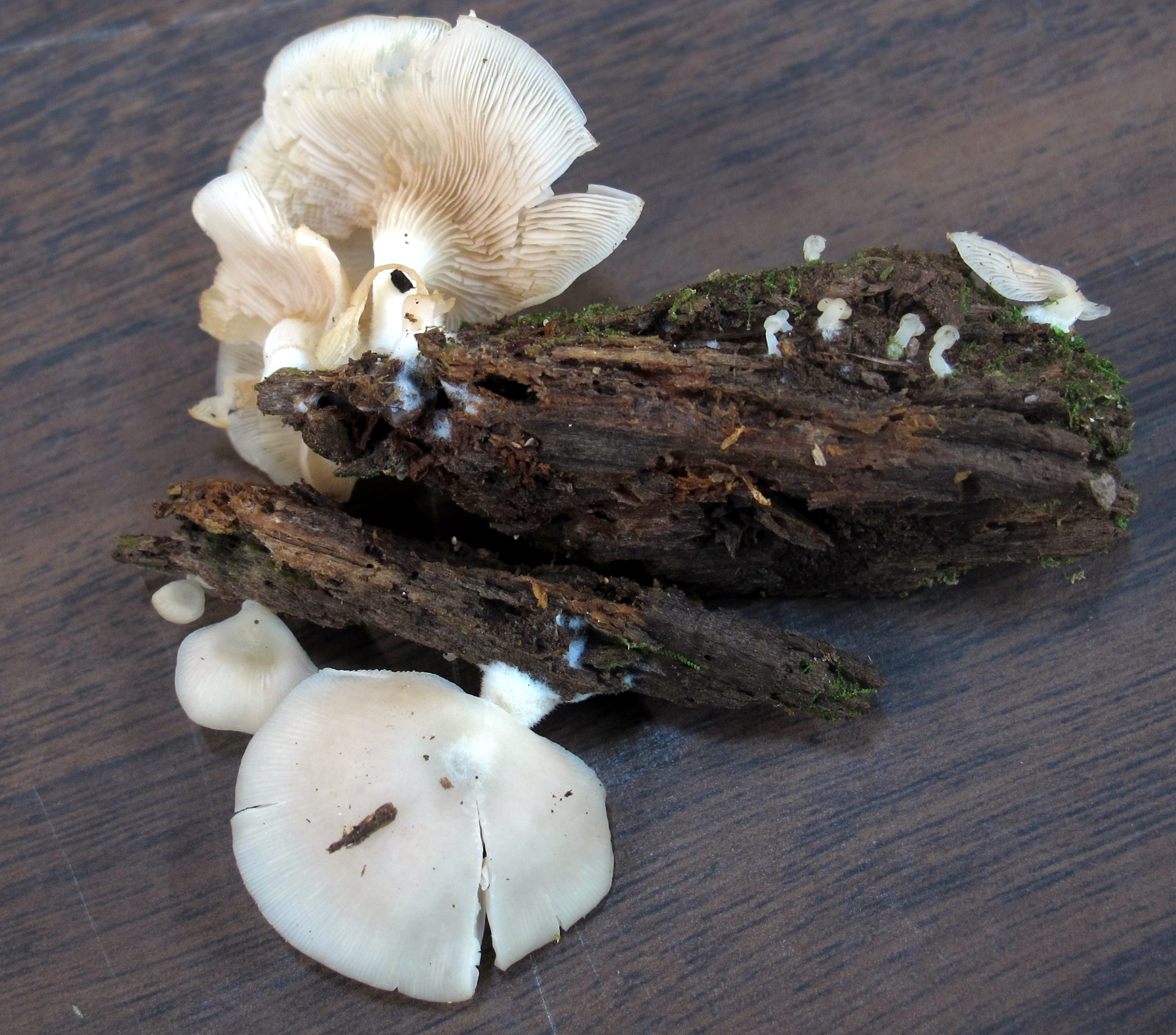
C. nyssicola

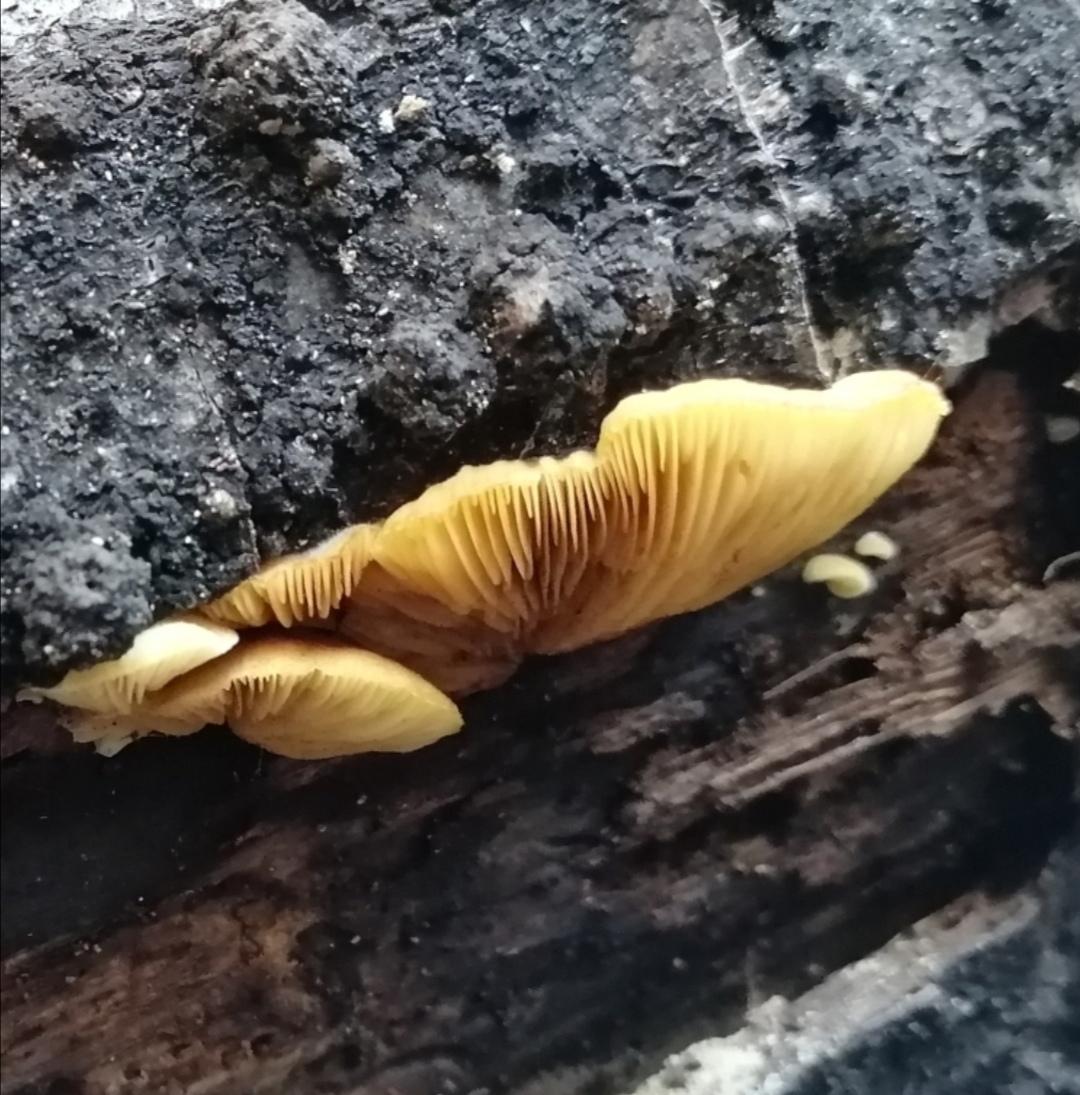
C. praecipuus

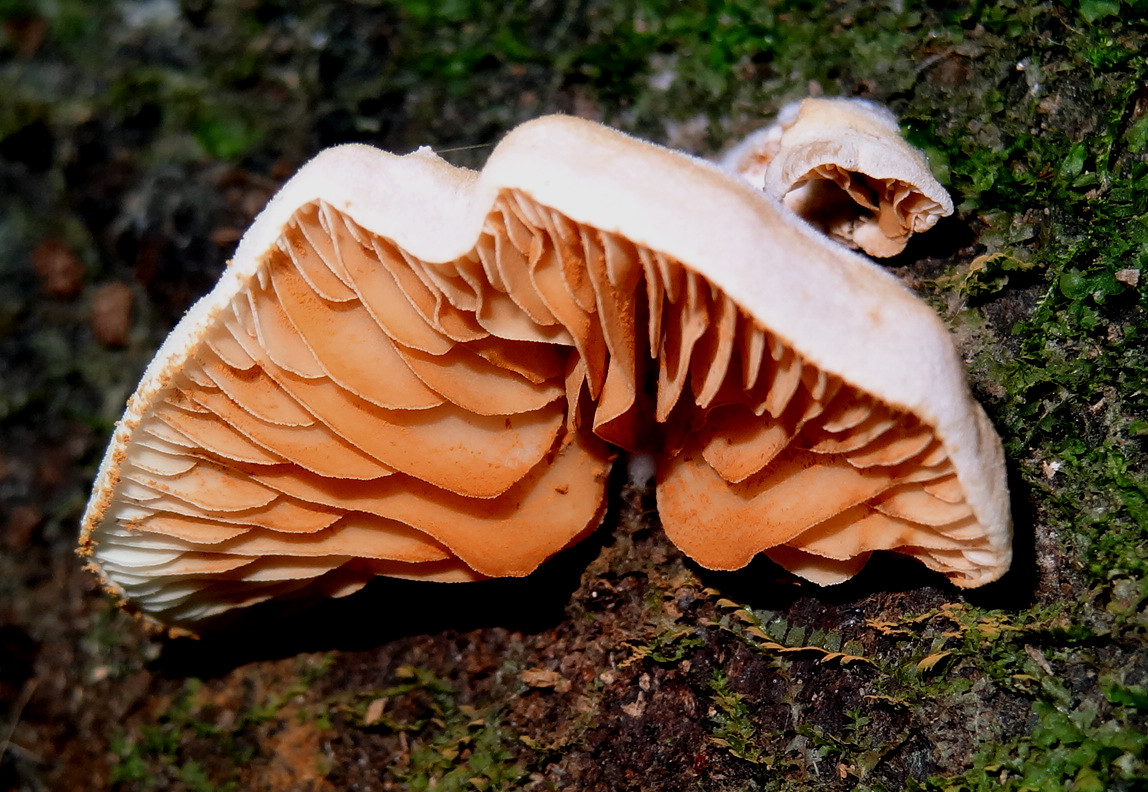
C. roseus

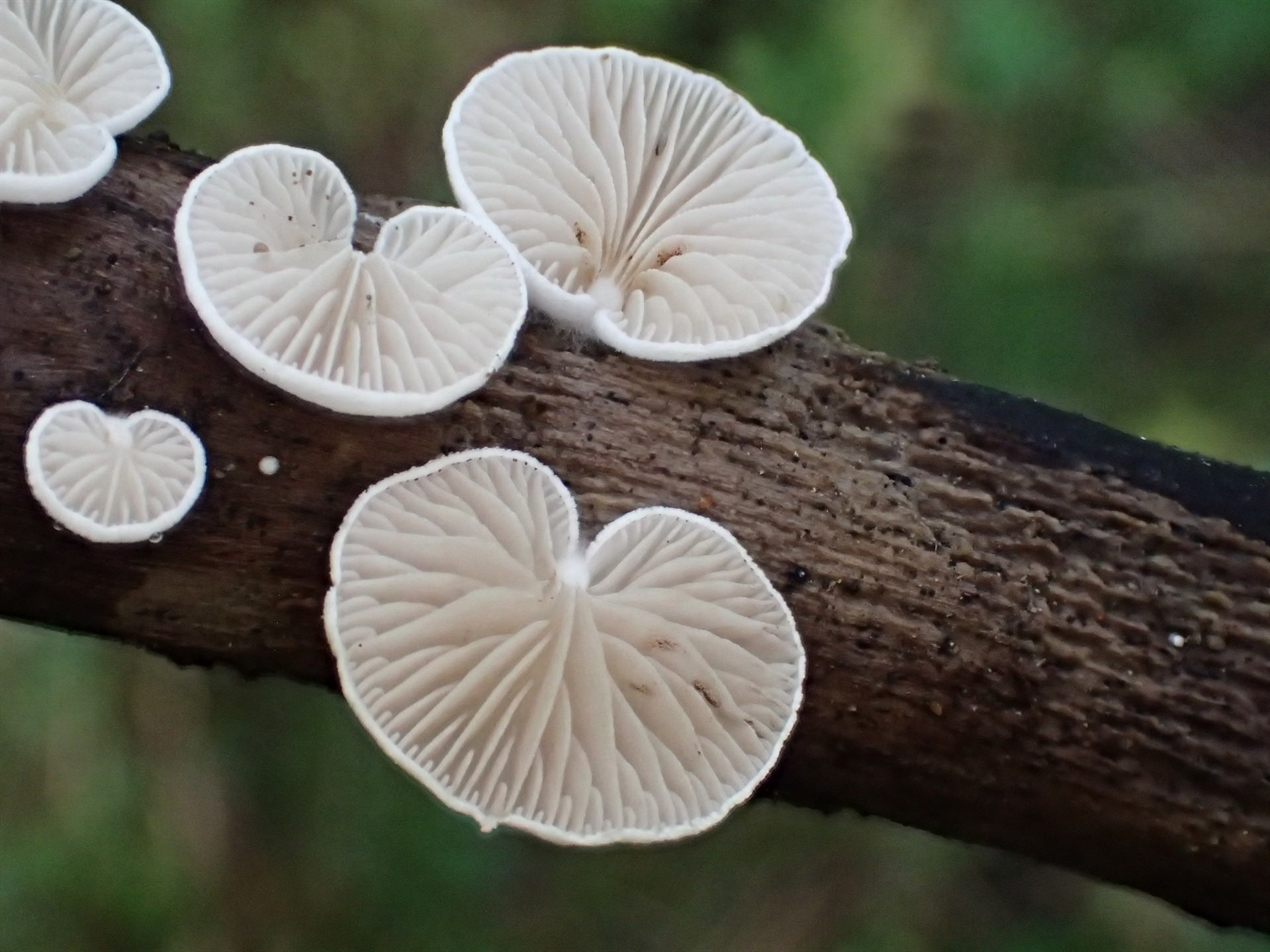
C. subverrucisporus

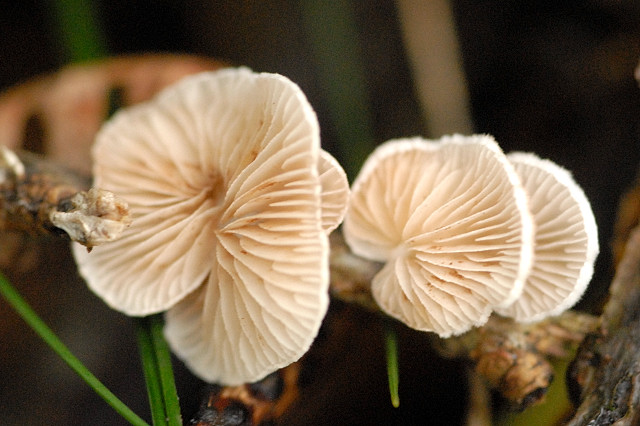
C. variabilis

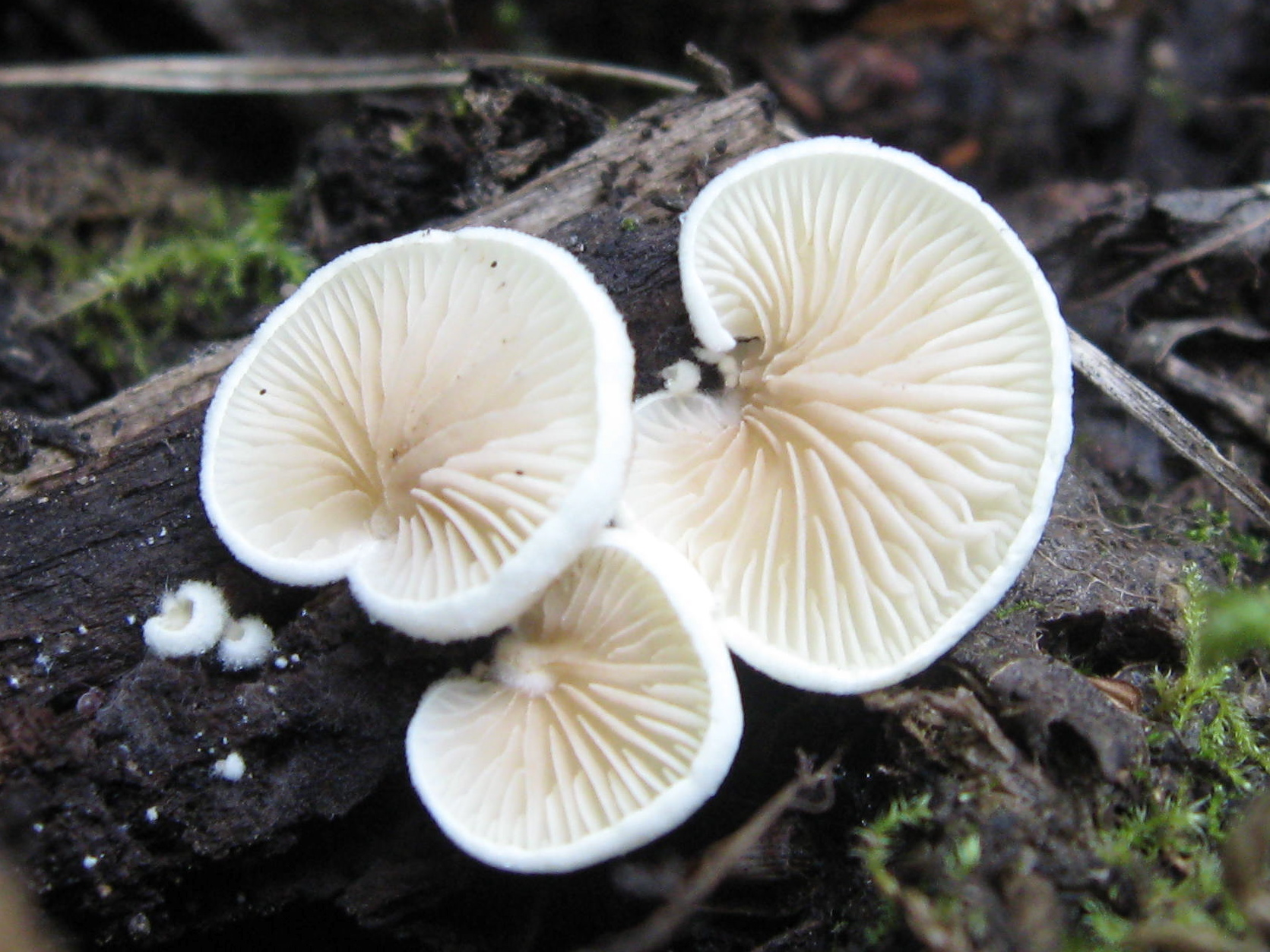
C. versutus
