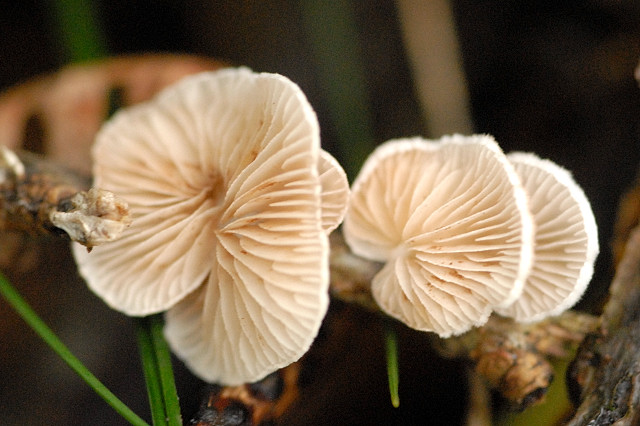
- Crepidotus variabilis

Scientific classification
- Kingdom: Fungi
- Division: Basidiomycota
- Class: Agaricomycetes
- Order: Agaricales
- Family: Crepidotaceae (S. Imai) Singer

Genera
- Crepidotus; Episphaeria; Neopaxillus; Pleuroflammula; Ramicola; Simocybe

= Crepidotaceae =

Family of fungi

The Crepidotaceae are a family of basidiomycete fungi.

== Taxonomic details ==
The Crepidotaceae have recently undergone a revision based on phylogenetic analyses. The following characters are typical of this family:

- saprotrophic on woody or herbaceous matter
- gymnocarpic (having the hymenium open and attached to the surface of the thallus)
- spore prints that are pale yellow to brown
- simple cuticle (although some may have pileocystidia)
- cheilocystidia always present
- spores entire, smooth or ornamented but never angular or reticulate
