= List of Star Wars filming locations =

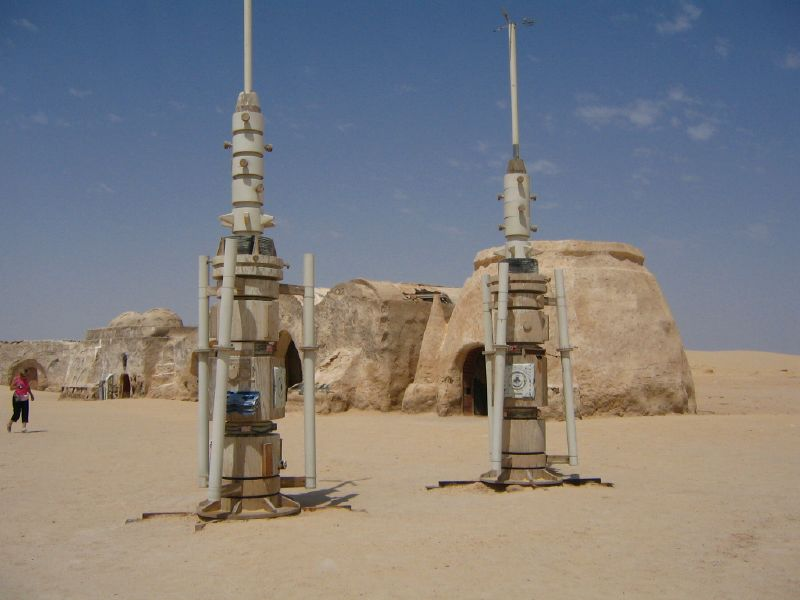
Mos Espa marketplace film set, located in the Eriguet dunes north of Nefta in southwestern Tunisia

Multiple global locations were used for filming locations during the production of the Star Wars films to provide the setting for alien planets in the Star Wars Universe.

Most locations were used to shoot principal photography with actors; more recently as digital filmmaking has become more common, some prequel and sequel trilogy locations were shot with no actors present and digitally composited into the films to provide a backdrop of a story setting.

In addition to filming locations, a list of film studios is also included for reference.

== Locations ==
Listed below are locations used for filming of the following Star Wars films and series:

- Star Wars: Episode IV – A New Hope (1977)
- Star Wars: Episode V – The Empire Strikes Back (1980)
- Star Wars: Episode VI – Return of the Jedi (1983)
- Star Wars: Episode I – The Phantom Menace (1999)
- Star Wars: Episode II – Attack of the Clones (2002)
- Star Wars: Episode III – Revenge of the Sith (2005)
- Star Wars: Episode VII – The Force Awakens (2015)
- Rogue One: A Star Wars Story (2016)
- Star Wars: Episode VIII – The Last Jedi (2017)
- Solo: A Star Wars Story (2018)
- Star Wars: Episode IX - The Rise of Skywalker (2019)
- Andor (2022)
- The Acolyte (2024)

=== Map ===
Map of Star Wars filming locations

=== Location filming ===
Image	Location	Country	Episode	Setting	Notes
Salt flat in Bolivia	Salar de Uyuni	Bolivia	VIII	Crait	This salt flat served as the filming location for the Battle of Crait
Tall karst mountains in the mist seen from the Li river	Guilin	China (Guangxi)	III	Kashyyyk	Footage of limestone karst mountains which was later composited into the film for the backdrop of Kashyyyk
Main street of Dubrovnik	Dubrovnik	Croatia	VIII	Cantonica	The city served for the city of Canto Bight
View of Tikal over rainforest trees	Tikal	Guatemala	IV	Yavin 4 Rebel Base	Exterior panoramic shots over the Yavin 4 jungle towards the Massassi Temple
Ice-covered mountain Eyjafjallajökull	Eyjafjallajökull	Iceland	VII	Starkiller Base	Snow scenes on the surface of Starkiller Base
The cliffs by Vík í Mýrdal, Iceland	Reynisfjara	Iceland	R1	Planet Lah'mu	A 20-minute drive from Vík í Mýrdal, Reynisfjara served as the setting for the planet Lah'mu.
Skellig Michael island in the Atlantic Ocean	Skellig Michael	Ireland	VII, VIII, IX	Ahch-To: Luke's refuge	Final scenes: Rey meeting Luke Skywalker for the first time VIII: Scenes of Luke's hideout and Rey's Jedi training
Eruption of lava from Etna in 2002	Mount Etna	Italy	III	Mustafar	The volcano erupted during filming of Episode III and Lucasfilm sent camera crews to shoot several angles of the eruption; footage was later composited into the background of the scenes set on Mustafar including the lightsaber duel of Obi-Wan Kenobi and Anakin Skywalker.
Sweeping marble staircase inside the Palace of Caserta	Palace of Caserta	Italy	I, II	Naboo Royal Palace	
Villa del Balbianello on Lake Como	Villa del Balbianello	Italy	II	Naboo lakeside	Used for Anakin and Padmé's wedding scene overlooking Lake Como
A mountain near the entrance to Wadi Rum	Wadi Rum	Jordan	R1, IX	Planet Jedha and Planet Pasaana	Wadi Rum is a popular desert location, also used in Lawrence of Arabia. This location earned the Royal Film Commission – Jordan the Location Managers Guild Award for best Film Commission in 2017.
Islands on the north eastern fringes of Laamu Atoll	Laamu Atoll	Maldives	R1	Planet Scarif	The Laamu Atoll makes up 82 of the 1,192 Maldivian islands. The atoll's Gan, which is one of the Maldives' largest islands, stood in for planet Scarif.
Hardangerjøkulen Glacier	Hardangerjøkulen Glacier and Finse 1222 Hotel	Norway	V	Hoth	Exterior scenes during the battle of Hoth filmed on the glacier, and other scenes filmed from the hotel and surrounding area
	Ciudad de las Artes y las Ciencias in Valencia	Spain	Andor	Coruscant	Upper reaches of the planet Coruscant from season 2
	Montserrat in Catalonia	Spain	Andor	Chandrila	Background images and the trailing scene from episode 2 of the second season.
	Fuerteventura in Canary Islands	Spain	Solo	Savareen	Desert scenes on the surface of Savareen
	Dolomites and Misurina	Italy	Solo	Vandor-1	Footage of the snowy landscape of Vandor-1
Curved colonnade of the Plaza de España	Plaza de España in Seville	Spain	II	Naboo: City of Theed	
snow-covered peak of the Jungfraujoch, Grindelwald	Grindelwald	Switzerland	III	Alderaan	Footage of mountain scenery which was later composited into the film for the backdrop of the planet Alderaan
	Phang Nga Bay, near Phuket	Thailand	III	Kashyyyk	Aerial footage of limestone karst mountains which was later composited into the film for the approach over the Battle of Kashyyyk
domed a mud building	Ajim	Tunisia	IV	Tatooine | Mos Eisley Spaceport: Cantina (exterior), plaza, stormtrooper checkpoint, Docking Bay 94 alley	Ajim city center neighborhood (Al-Hunit Mosque district). Djerba island.
	Amghar Mosque	Tunisia	IV	Tatooine | Obi-Wan Kenobi's house (exterior)	Ibadi mosque (10th century CE). Ajim coastal outskirts. Médenine Governorate. Decommissioned place of worship. Amghar Mosque footage replaced in Episode IV Special Edition (1997).
remains of the Lars Homestead in the desert	Chott el-Djerid	Tunisia	IV, II, III	Tatooine | Lars Homestead (exterior)	Salt flats between the Kebili and Tozeur governorates. Film site area in northwest sector of Chott el-Djerid. West of Nefta.
Sand dunes near Nefta	Gour Beni Mzab	Tunisia	IV	Tatooine | dune sea (lifepod crash site & krayt dragon skeleton)	Linear dunes system. Tozeur Governorate. West of Nefta. Film site location formerly associated with the name "La Grande Dune."
	Eriguet dunes (Mos Espa large set area)	Tunisia	I, II	Tatooine | Mos Espa marketplace & Mos Espa arena elements (grandstand, pit area, starting grid, viewing platform)	Eriguet dune system. Salt-saturated barchanoid dunes south of Chott el-Gharsa. North of Nefta. Tozeur Governorate. Mos Espa arena elements are located north and west of the Mos Espa marketplace set (known also as the Mos Espa large set).
	Eriguet dunes (Mos Espa small set area)	Tunisia	I	Tatooine | Mos Espa slave quarters backyards & Mos Espa outskirts	Eriguet dune system. Salt-saturated barchanoid dunes south of Chott el-Gharsa. North of Nefta. Tozeur Governorate. Located one dune east of the Mos Espa large set. Mos Espa small set remains are buried by dunes. Mos Espa small set was a reproduction of key elements found in the northwest corner of Ksar Hadada. Yardang field featured as film site area for Qui-Gon Jinn vs. Darth Maul lightsaber duel & Naboo spacecraft ramp scenes.
Hotel Sididriss, Matmata	Hotel Sidi Idriss	Tunisia	IV, II	Tatooine | Lars Homestead (interior)	Located in Matmata al-Qadimal. Gabès Governorate. Hotel established in 1968. Consists of five interconnected subterranean (troglodyte) pit dwellings. Pit 2 is the film site location. Cave 9 in pit 2 is the Lars Homestead dining room.
	Ksar Hadada	Tunisia	I	Tatooine | Mos Espa slave quarters backyards & street	Amazigh fortified granary village (mid-19th century CE). Tataouine Governorate. One of the largest remaining ksour in southeastern Tunisia. Film site area located in northwest corner of the ksar.
	Ksar Ommarsia	Tunisia	I	Tatooine | Mos Espa slave quarters street & Anakin Skywalker's hovel (exterior)	Amazigh fortified granary (early 19th century CE). One of three remaining ksour in Médenine city center. Médenine Governorate. Film site location often erroneously identified as Ksar Médenine.
Closeup of a rocky outcrop in Sidi Bouhlel canyon	Maguer Gorge	Tunisia	IV, I	Tatooine | Jundland Wastes, desert wasteland bluff overlooking Mos Eisley, Canyon Dune Turn (Mos Espa podrace circuit)	Maguer Gorge located in Jebel Sidi Bouhlel mountain region. Dghoumès National Park. Tozeur Governorate. Often identified as Sidi Bouhlel Canyon due to the prominent shrine (Sidi Bouhlel Marabout) situated above the western ridge of the gorge. Nicknamed "Star Wars Canyon" by Lucasfilm crews. Numerous iconic scenes filmed inside, above, and at the entrance of the gorge. Lucasfilm returned to the gorge more than 20 years after filming Episode IV to shoot Episode I Tusken Raider sniper sequences for the Boonta Eve Classic podrace.
	Ong Jemel outcrop	Tunisia	I	Tatooine | Sith landing desert mesa, Canyon Dune Turn (Mos Espa podrace circuit)	Ong Jemel (Arabic: "camel's neck"). Meteorized rock zooform. Chott el-Gharsa salt flats. Directly near the Eriguet dunes boundary. Tozeur Governorate. North/northwest side of the outcrop loosely resembles a camel's neck. No footage of this portion of the outcrop was featured in the film.
	Sidi Jemour Mosque	Tunisia	IV	Tatooine | Anchorhead main road, Tosche Station (exterior), Mos Eisley perimeter	Ibadi mosque complex (16th century CE). Sidi Jemour coastal area. Groa outskirts. Médenine Governorate. Not a functioning mosque during Episode IV filming. Revived as a place of worship in 2013/2014. Extensive deleted Anchorhead/Tosche Station content filmed at this location involving Luke Skywalker, Biggs Darklighter, Camie, and The Fixer. Only Episode IV footage featuring this location is the Mos Eisley perimeter transition plate.
Sunset over the Rub' al Khali sand dunes	Rub' al Khali	United Arab Emirates	VII	Jakku	Desert scenes on the planet Jakku
	Barbican Estate	United Kingdom (England)	Andor	Coruscant	Used for multiple scenes of Coruscant in both seasons.
	Beedon Common	United Kingdom (England)	Andor	Frezno	Location of Doctor Quadpaw's hut.
	Black Park, Buckinghamshire	United Kingdom (England)	VII, IX, Andor	Takodana, Kenari	In the sequel trilogy, Black Park doubled as Takodana. In Andor, it was used in flashback scenes for Cassian Andor's home planet Kenari.
Empty expanse of tarmac at Bovingdon Airfield	Bovingdon Airfield, Hertfordshire	United Kingdom (England)	R1	Scarif	Battle scenes on the surface of Scarif
	Brunswick Centre	United Kingdom (England)	Andor	Coruscant	Doubled as an apartment complex in Coruscant. This is where Eedy Karn's, Syril Karn's mother, apartment is.
Interior of Canary Wharf	Canary Wharf	United Kingdom (England)	R1, Andor	Imperial Base, Coruscant	London's Canary Wharf tube station was used as the setting for the Imperial security complex on Scarif. The Norman Foster-designed station's escalators and glass safety doors are particularly noticeable in the film. Adams Plaza Bridge doubles as the ISB entrance in the planet Coruscant, in Andor.
	Carmel College, Oxfordshire	United Kingdom (England)	Andor	Niamos	Served as the Niamos Courthouse where Cassian Andor is sentenced.
	Cleveleys, Lancashire	United Kingdom (England)	Andor	Niamos	
	Coryton Refinery, Essex	United Kingdom (England)	Andor	Imperial Facilities, Morlana One	
View over Derwentwater towards Maiden Moor	Derwentwater, Cumbria	United Kingdom (England)	VII	Takodana	Lakeside setting of Maz Kanata's Castle on Takodana; some Lakeland Fells in the background are altered with CGI
	Dunsfold Aerodrome	United Kingdom (England)	Solo	Corellia | Coronet City Spaceport	Used for stunts and Han Solo's chase sequence.
	Englefield, Berkshire	United Kingdom (England)	The Acolyte	Khofar	Location for forest scenes
	Fawley Power Station, Hampshire	United Kingdom (England)	Solo	Corellia	The disused power station was used to represent Han Solo's homeworld of Corellia.
	Guildhall	United Kingdom (England)	Andor	Ghorman	
	Hever Castle, Kent	United Kingdom (England)	I, Andor	Naboo	Used during 'the Waterfall Sequence' in the phantom menace. In Andor, the Castle was used during a flashback sequence, doubling as Naboo again.
Ivinghoe Beacon seen from The Ridgeway	Ivinghoe Beacon, Buckinghamshire	United Kingdom (England)	IX	Kef Bir	Hill location covered in grassland
	Kynance Cove	United Kingdom (England)	VIII	Ahch-To	Additional footage for Ahch-To.
	Lloyd's building	United Kingdom (England)	Andor	Coruscant	Confrontation between Cassian Andor and Luthen Rael.
	Little Marlow	United Kingdom (England)	Andor	Ferrix	Temporary set built
	McLaren Technology Centre	United Kingdom (England)	Andor	Coruscant	In season 1, the main lobby used as Coruscant's transportation hub. In season 2, the OKX Thought Leadership Center doubled as the ISB's operations room.
	Middle Peak Quarry, Wirksworth, Derbyshire	United Kingdom (England)	Andor	Narkina 5	Doubled as the small water moon Narkina 5 in episode 11.
moss-covered rocks in Puzzlewood Forest	Puzzlewood, Forest of Dean	United Kingdom (England)	VII	Takodana	Forest scenes on the surface of Takodana
Cardington 2003	RAF Cardington, Bedfordshire	United Kingdom (England)	IV, R1	Yavin 4 Rebel Base	Interior of disused WWII airship sheds were used for the Rebel Base hangar scenes inside the Massassi Temple on the Fourth Moon of Yavin IV; Shed 1 was used in Ep.IV and Shed 2 was used for Rogue One.
Disused missile silo at RAF Greenham Common	RAF Greenham Common, Berkshire	United Kingdom (England)	VII, VIII, Andor	D'Qar	Disused aircraft revetments formed the backdrop for the Resistance Base. Doubled as Saw Gerrera's D'Qar base in Andor season 2.
Thirlmere Reservoir	Thirlmere, Cumbria	United Kingdom (England)	VII	Takodana	Low-level X-Wing flight sequences over Takodana; the background was apparently flipped horizontally
Glade in Whippendell Wood	Whippendell Wood, Cassiobury Park, Watford	United Kingdom (England)	I	Naboo | forest scene	First meeting of Qui-Gon Jinn and Obi-Wan Kenobi with Jar Jar Binks.
	Winspit, Dorset	United Kingdom (England)	Andor	Segra Milo	Location of Saw Gerrera's secret base in Andor.
Imperial Sand Dunes ni the Yuma Desert	Buttercup Valley (Imperial Sand Dunes)	United States (California)	VI	Tatooine | dune sea	Buttercup Valley is located in southeastern California ca. 10 miles from the Arizona border. Yuma (Arizona) is the closest town to the film site. Location used for the Great Pit of Carkoon scene. Lucasfilm returned to this area in August 1995 to shoot additional action for the Episode IV Special Edition (1997). Footage of stormtroopers roaming the dune sea in search of droids was fused with the original content filmed in the Gour Beni Mzab dunes (Tunisia) in March 1976.
Mesquite Sand Dunes in Death Valley Dante's View looking North C-3PO and NPS ranger	Death Valley National Park	United States (California)	IV	Tatooine desert	Several Tatooine scenes: Mesquite Flat Sand Dunes - scene where R2-D2 goes his separate way after he and C-3PO crash their escape pod on Tatooine (spliced with footage shot in Tunisia); Artists Palette & Golden Canyon - Canyon where R2-D2 is abducted by Jawas (spliced with footage shot at Sidi Bouhlel, Tunisia); Artist's Drive - Where the miniature Sandcrawler was filmed for the shot of R2-D2 being carried up to it by Jawas; Desolation Canyon - Canyon where Tusken Raiders mount Bantha before Luke Skywalker is attacked (spliced with Sidi Bouhlel footage); Dante's View - panoramic establishing shot of Mos Eisley (spliced with Sidi Bouhlel footage of Luke and Obi-Wan standing on rocky outcrop)
dense redwood forest in the Redwood National Park	Del Norte County, CA	United States (California)	VI	Endor	Forest scenes on the moon of Endor
Wide, rocky sandy canyon with path	Twenty-Mule Team Canyon, Death Valley, California	United States (California)	VI	Tatooine: Road to Jabba's Palace	Two Tatooine scenes: C-3PO and R2-D2 walk up to the Palace of Jabba the Hutt on Tatooine.; "Lost scene" of Luke Skywalker working on a new lightsaber in a cave overlooking the Millennium Falcon and his X-wing, followed by R2-D2 and C-3PO starting their trek to Jabba's palace.

== Studios ==
Image	Location	Country	Episode	Setting	Notes
Fox Studios Sydney	Fox Studios, Sydney	Australia (New South Wales)	II, CW, III, R, VII, IX		
The white lodge at Ealing Film Studios	Arborfield Studios	United Kingdom (England)	The Acolyte		
The white lodge at Ealing Film Studios	Ealing Studios	United Kingdom (England)	II		
Stage 7 at Elstree Studios	Elstree Studios	United Kingdom (England)	II, III, R1, IV, V, VI		The largest Stage 6 was built specifically for The Empire Strikes Back in 1979 (since demolished)
Leavesden Studios	Leavesden Studios	United Kingdom (England)	I		
File:Entrance to Pinewood Studios	Pinewood Studios	United Kingdom (England)	VII, R1, VIII, Solo, IX, Andor		
File:Entrance to Shepperton Studios	Shepperton Studios	United Kingdom (England)	III, IV		Stage H was used for the final awards ceremony at the end of Episode IV
	Shinfield Studios	United Kingdom (England)	The Acolyte		

== See also ==
Behind-the-scenes documentaries:

- The Making of Star Wars
- SP FX: The Empire Strikes Back
- Classic Creatures: Return of the Jedi
- From Star Wars to Jedi: The Making of a Saga
- Empire of Dreams: The Story of the Star Wars Trilogy
- Star Wars: The Legacy Revealed
