= Cassiobury Park =

Park in Watford, Hertfordshire, England

Coordinates: 51°39′35″N 0°25′0″W

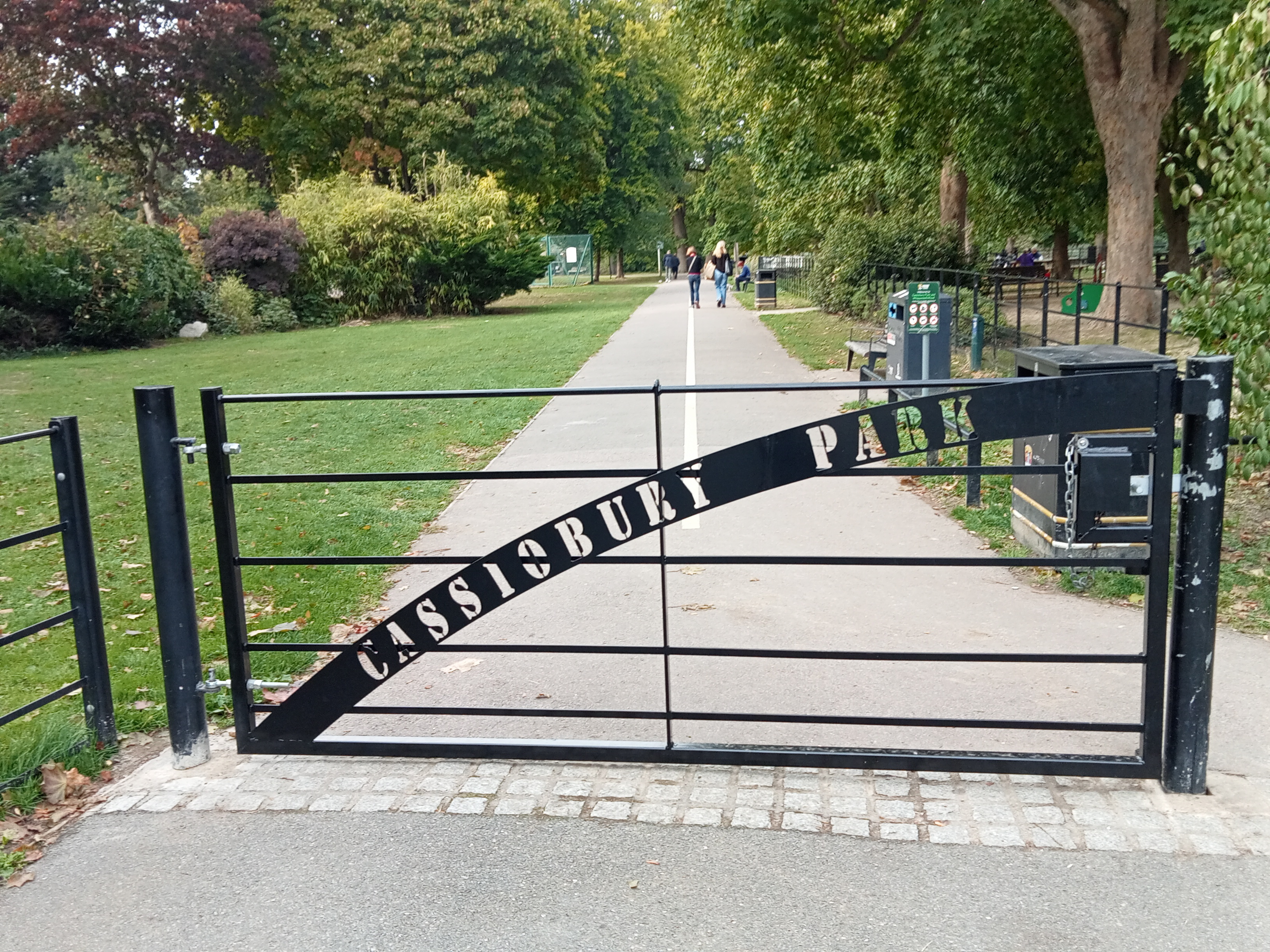
- Interactive map of Cassiobury Park
- Type: Public park
- Location: Watford, Hertfordshire, England
- Area: 190 acres (0.77 km^{2})
- Operator: Watford Borough Council
- Status: Open year round
- Website: watford.gov.uk/cassioburypark

Cassiobury Park is the principal public park in Watford, Hertfordshire, in England. It was created in 1909 from the purchase by Watford Borough Council of part of the estate of the Earls of Essex around Cassiobury House which was subsequently demolished in 1927. It comprises over 190 acres (77 ha) and extends from the A412 Rickmansworth Road in the east to the Grand Union Canal in the west, and lies to the south of the Watford suburb of Cassiobury, which was also created from the estate. The western part is a 62-acre (25.1 ha) Local Nature Reserve managed by the Herts and Middlesex Wildlife Trust. The park hosts the free, weekly timed parkrun 5 km event every Saturday morning at 9 am, starting on the field near the Shepherds Road entrance to the park, and finishing by the bandstand.

== History ==
=== 14th to 19th century ===
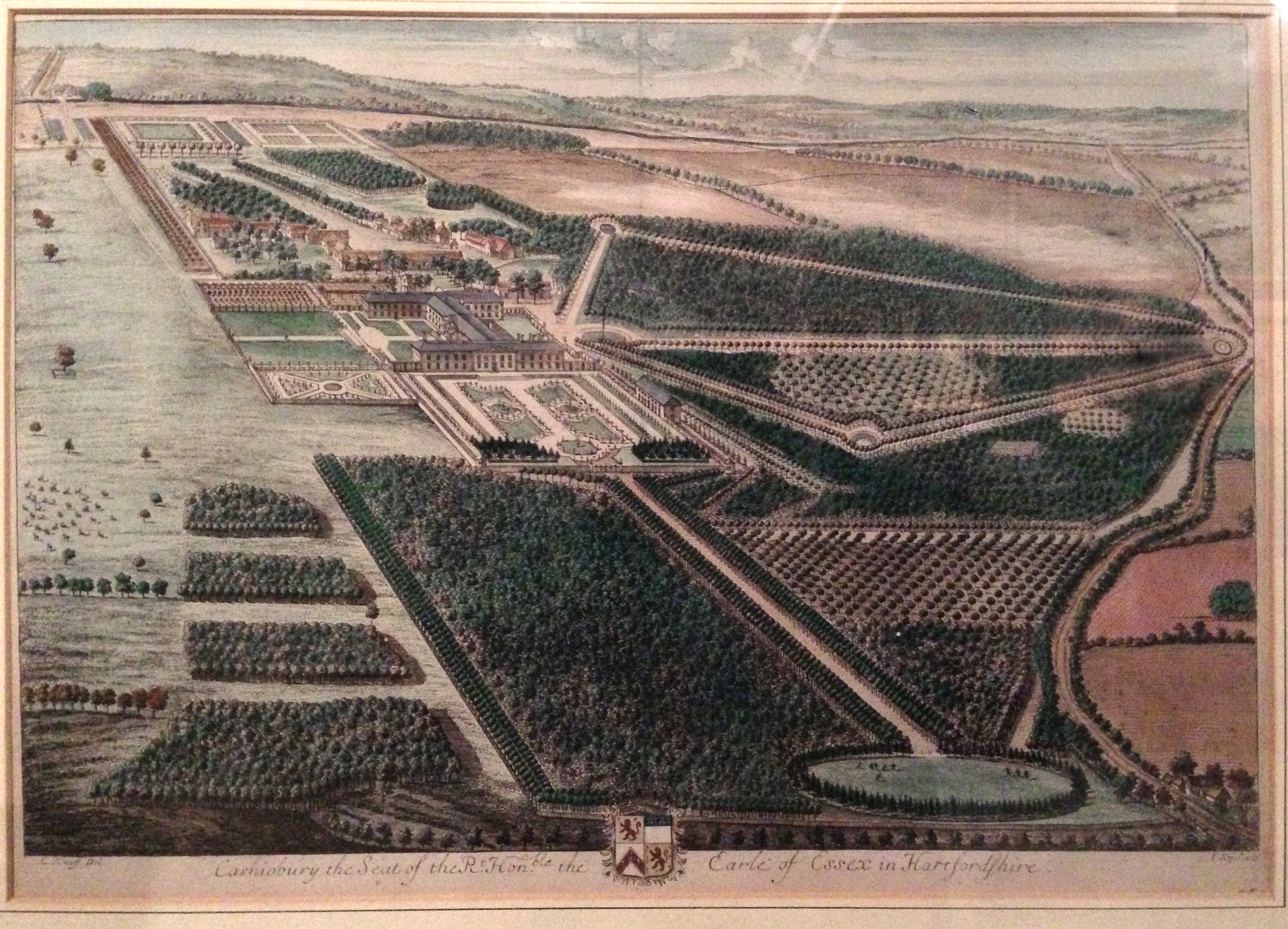
1707 engraving of Lord Essex's Cassiobury Park, by Kip and Knyff

St Albans Abbey claimed rights to the manor of Cashio (then called "Albanestou"), which included Watford, dating from a grant by King Offa in 793. When Henry VIII dissolved the monasteries in 1539, Watford was divided from Cashio and Henry assumed the lordship of the manor of Cassiobury. In 1546 he granted the manor to Sir Richard Morrison, who started building Cassiobury House with the extensive grounds which were much larger than they are today, reaching as far as North Watford and southwards almost to Moor Park. The Tudor mansion was completed by his son, Sir Charles Morrison, and boasted 56 rooms, a long gallery, stables, a dairy and a brewhouse.

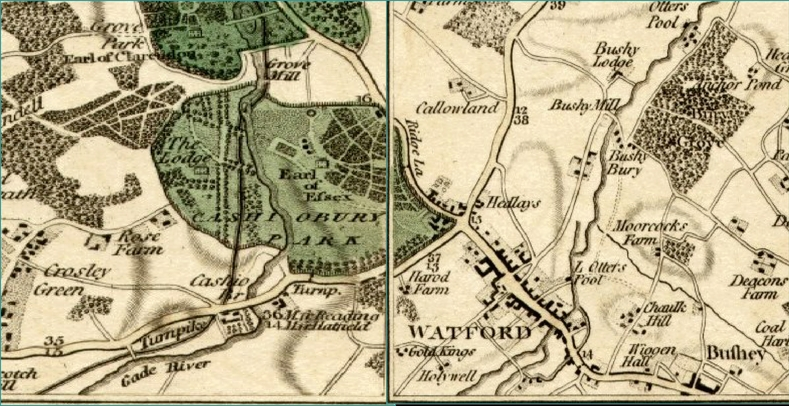
A map by John Cary showing the grounds of the park in 1800

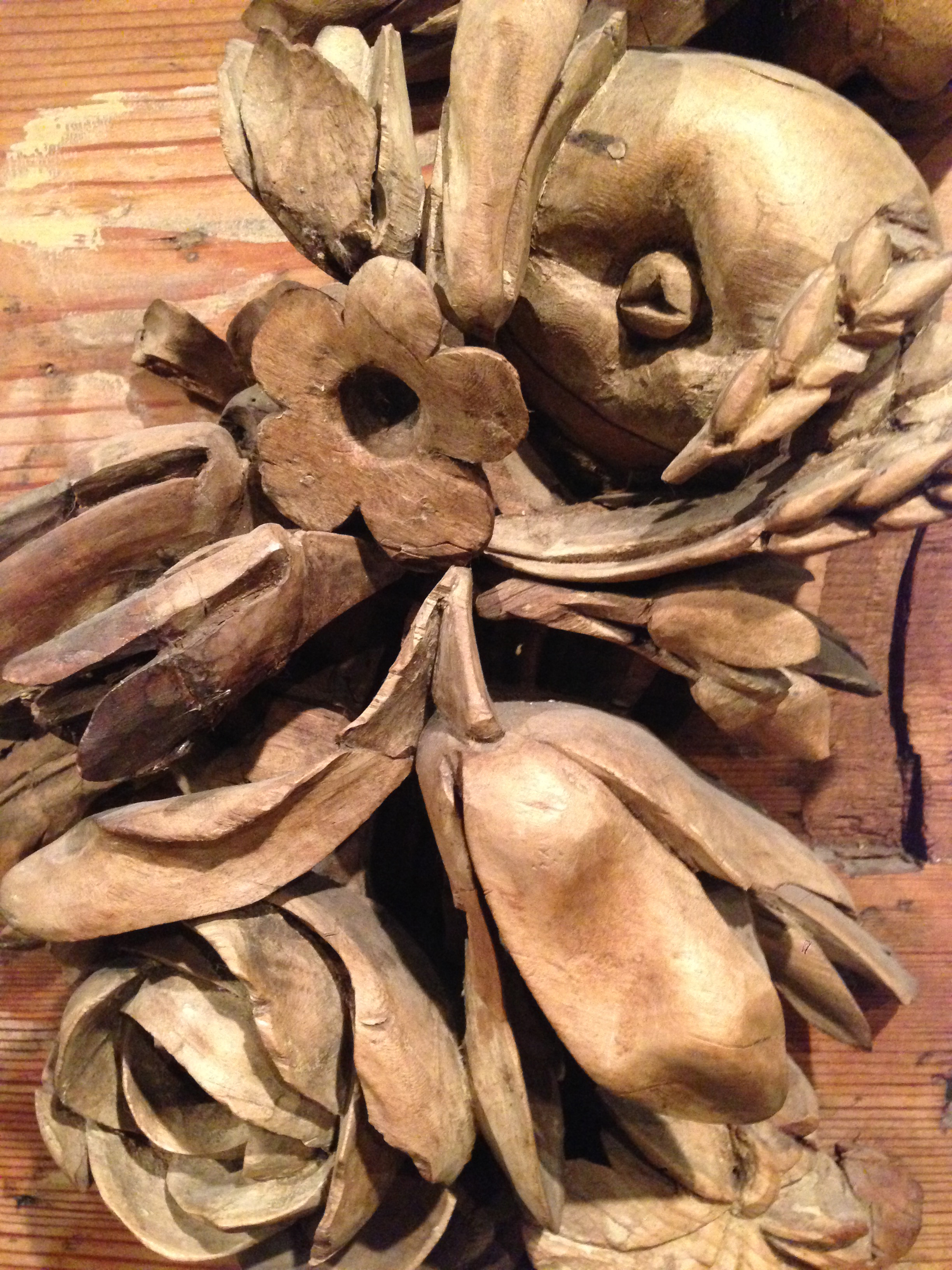
Clock surround built for Cassiobury House, c.1678

In 1627 the estate passed into the Capel family through marriage. Arthur Capell, 1st Earl of Essex, commissioned Hugh May to rebuild the Tudor house, c.1677–80, with sumptuous interiors created in collaboration with the wood carver Grinling Gibbons and the painter Antonio Verrio. The park and gardens were laid out by Moses Cooke who devised woodland walks and avenues, and provided "an excellent collection of the choicest fruits". Later, the gardeners George London and Charles Bridgeman also worked at Cassiobury. Between 1672 and 1720 an avenue of 296 lime trees was planted, linking the gardens to Whippendell Wood; remnants can still be seen today.

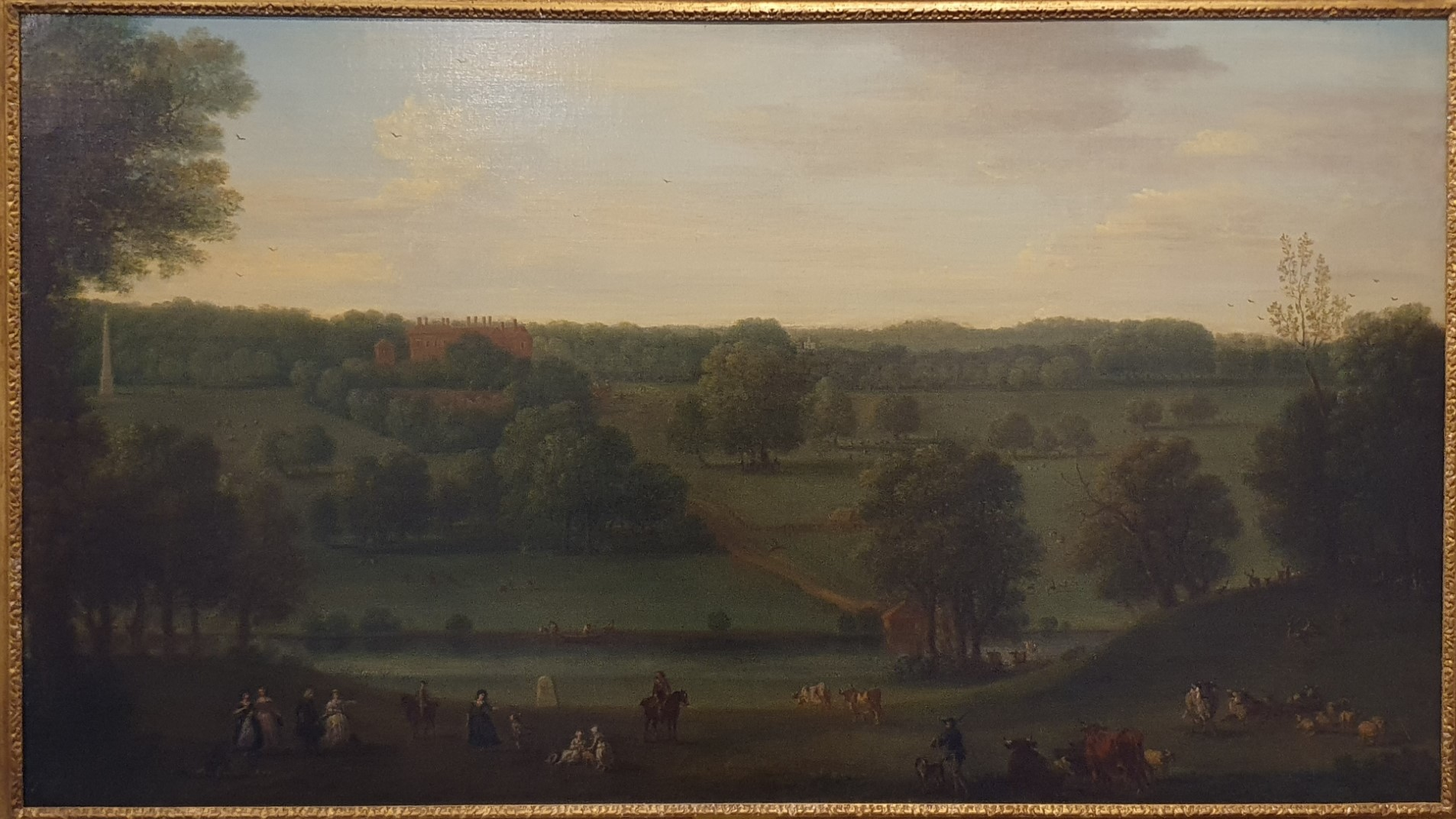
A vista of Cassiobury Park, painted by John Wooton during the time of the 4th Earl, whose family can be seen in the foreground along with their servants.

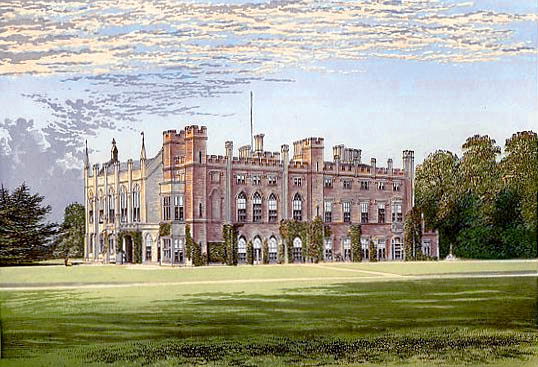
A chromolithograph of Cassiobury, published around 1880

In the late eighteenth century, parts of the Grand Union Canal passing through the property were widened and landscaped on the insistence of William Capell, 4th Earl of Essex, who sat on the board of the canal company.

C. 1799–1805, the 5th Earl of Essex commissioned James Wyatt to remodel the house in the Gothic style, and Humphry Repton to overhaul the park. Later, a number of lodges and other buildings were constructed by Wyatt's nephew, Jeffry Wyatville; of these, only Cassiobury Lodge in Gade Avenue survives. At this time the park comprised 693 acres (280 ha), the Home Park and the Upper Park being separated by the River Gade. The Upper Park became the West Herts Golf Course.

In 1841 a fire destroyed the orangery, which was filled with newly collected plants and fine orange trees, some of which had been presented to the 6th Earl by Louis XVIII. Herds of deer roamed the park. Parties were a regular feature at the weekends. The public were allowed to ride and walk through the grounds, but had to apply for a ticket in advance.

=== 20th century ===
George Capell, 7th Earl of Essex married an American heiress, helping to maintain the estate. The parties and entertainments at Cassiobury House continued into the new century: in 1902 it was visited by the young Winston Churchill and King Edward VII. But at about this time the Essex family planned to let the house and live in London. The upkeep was becoming increasingly expensive. In 1909, 184 acres (0.74 km^{2}) of parkland were sold, most to Watford Borough Council for housing and the public park. After the 7th Earl's death (1916), his widow and her son, the 8th Earl, sold up in 1922 to pay death duties, and the house was demolished for its materials in 1927. More land for the public park was purchased by Watford Borough Council in 1930.

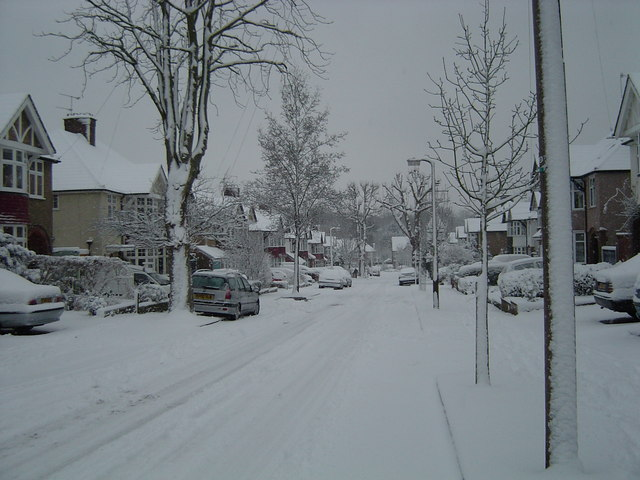
Cassiobury Park Avenue, typical suburbia built on former parkland

Construction of the residential Cassiobury Estate began. The land was made subject to restrictive covenants stipulating that only good quality detached or semi-detached houses would be allowed. Most activity was in the 1930s, though building still continues, mostly of "infill" housing on former back gardens. The park is bounded by Parkside Drive and Coningsby Drive on the north, and Cassiobury Park Avenue on the south.

On Thursday 8 June 1922, at 2.30 p.m. at 20 Hanover Square, "By direction of the Right Honourable Adèle, Countess Dowager of Essex", "Cassiobury Park estate including the historical family mansion, Little Cassiobury, and the West Herts Golf Links, embracing in all an Area of about 870 acres (3.5 km^{2})" was auctioned by Humbert & Flint, in conjunction with Knight, Frank & Rutley.

Having remained unoccupied and unsold, the house itself was demolished in 1927. Only the stable block remains: this has been converted to Cassiobury Court, a rehab centre for addicts, still extant in Richmond Drive. The grand staircase (said to be designed by Gibbons but since attributed to Edmund Pearce) was removed to the Metropolitan Museum of Art in New York. Other materials from the house were used to restore Monmouth House in Watford High Street. Posters advertised "To lovers of the antique, architects, builders, etc., 300 tons of old oak: 100 very fine old oak beams and 10,000 Tudor period bricks".

"English country house in New York" in Country Life on Tuesday, 21 July 2009, by Arabella Youens says that salvaged material from the old mansion was used to build a new Cassiobury House in the US:-

"When Cassiobury House in Hertfordshire, home to the Earls of Essex for more than 250 years, was dismantled in 1927 much of the masonry was used in the construction of a new house of the same name in Bedford, New York."

In 1967, the quaint, castellated entrance gates on the Rickmansworth Road were demolished to make way for a new traffic system.

Little Cassiobury (Grade II* listed), the Cassiobury Estate dower house, still exists in Hempstead Road, Watford. It was sold separately from the rest of the estate. While it was in private ownership it was extended and renovated, in 1937, by the Portmeirion architect Clough Williams-Ellis. Soon after that it was compulsorily purchased by Hertfordshire County Council, who built Watford College (latterly West Herts College) on part of the site. Herts County Council used Little Cassiobury as an education office for most of the 20th century.

== Etymology ==
The name "Caegesho" referred to a larger area of land granted by Offa to the Abbey of St Albans in 793. "Caeg" (Old English cæg) may have been a man's name, while Old English ho means "a spur of land". It was spelled "Caissou" or "Chaissou" in the 11th century and gradually evolved into "Cassio". The suffix "-bury" occurs in many English place names. It comes from the Old English word for a fortified place, burh, whose dative, byrig, means "by the fort", or "by the manor".

== Layout ==
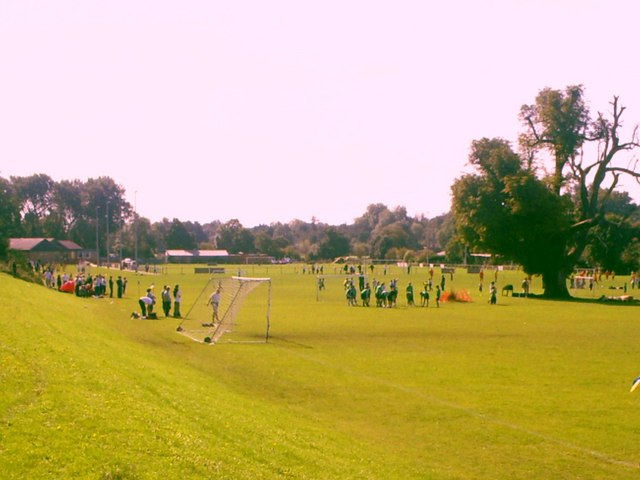
Amateur football

Much of the park is covered by mown grass and scattered trees. There are notable specimens of American oaks such as the pin oak Quercus palustris Muenchh. and the scarlet oak Q. coccinea Muenchh. The cedar of Lebanon Cedrus libani A. Richard is a prominent feature, though some of the older and unsafe specimens have been removed. Many more recent plantings of exotics have been made, such as swamp cypress Taxodium distichum (L.) Richards and various Asian rowans Sorbus spp.

The park slopes generally downhill from east to west, into the alluvial valley of the River Gade. The broadly meandering river and its bridges add much charm; the canal takes a more direct route. The direction of flow is north to south. The Gade is a tributary of the Colne, which ultimately flows into the Thames at Staines.

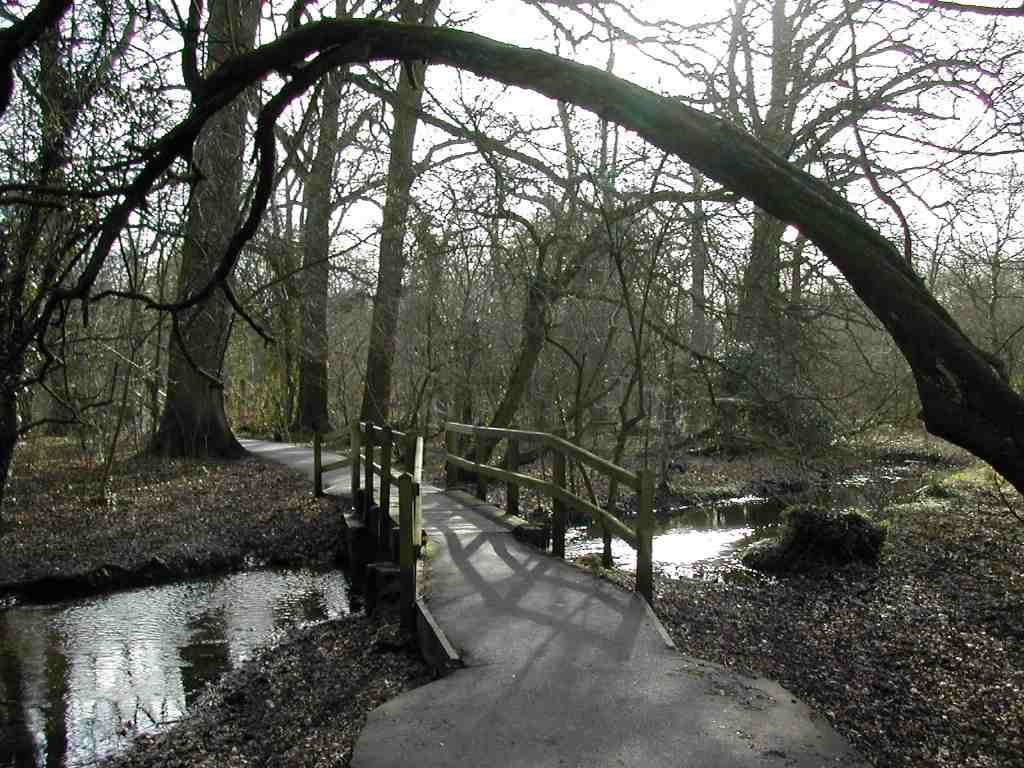
A stream near the River Gade

The valley is partly wooded. Some of the woodland is rather wet and gloomy, but very beautiful; alder Alnus glutinosa (L.) Gaertn. is frequent beside the streams. Here also may be found the remains of beds and ditches for growing watercress Rorippa nasturtium-aquaticum (L.) Hayek. These are largely silted up and overgrown, but the original springs are still flowing. Beyond the river and canal the ground rises quite steeply to the West Herts Golf Course, beyond which lies Whippendell Wood. The whole area is freely accessible and surprisingly unspoilt, given its proximity to London, about 20 miles away.

Man-made structures in the park include a complex of paddling-pools and an adjacent miniature railway near the Gade, tennis-courts, a bowling green, a system of all-weather asphalt paths, and a number of shelters. The Watford Miniature Railway has a gauge of 10 1/4" and runs for 1010 yards around part of the park. Steam and diesel locomotives are used on passenger trains.

== Fauna and flora ==
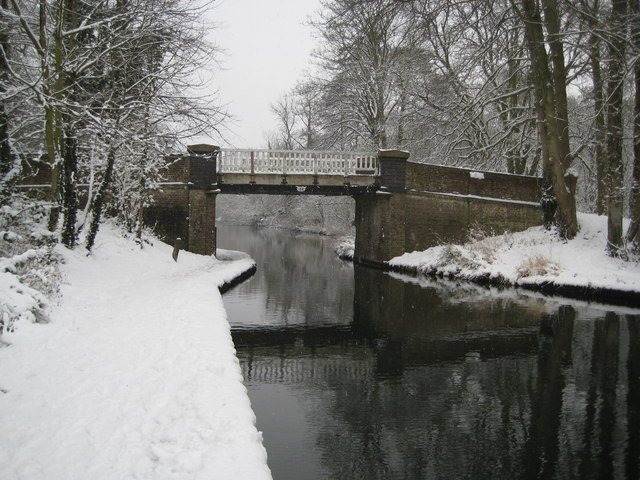
The Grand Union Canal

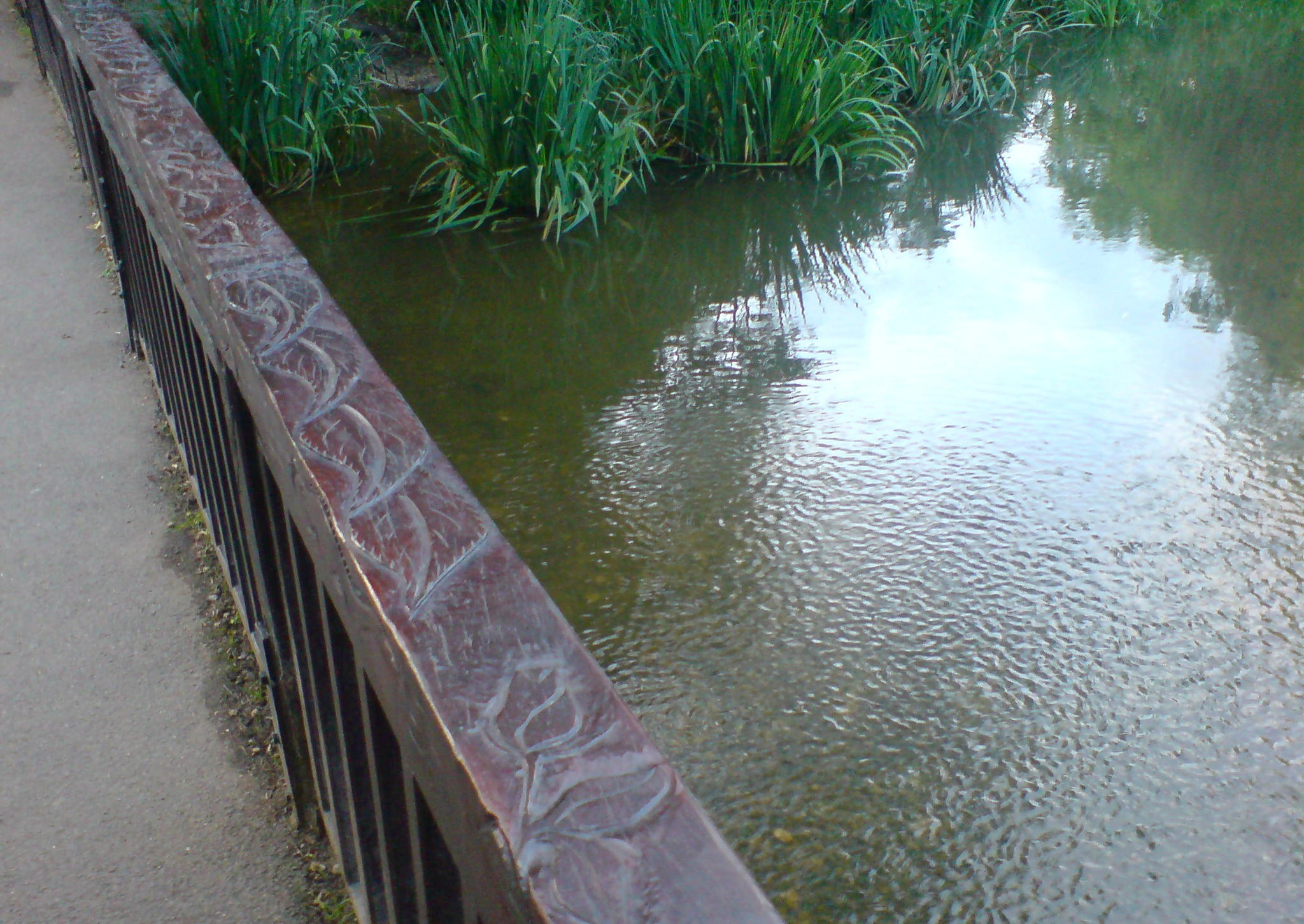
The "Carved Bridge" with the River Gade flowing under

The bird-life of the formal areas is typical of parkland in southern England. Nuthatches like the old timber; spotted flycatchers the more open ground; and redwings and fieldfares the more open ground yet. Common and black-headed, and sometimes lesser black-backed and herring, gulls form loose flocks on the lower reaches towards the Gade.

The canal, the river and its associated streams provide more interest for the bird-watcher. Teal (Anas crecca), water rail (Rallus aquaticus), grey wagtail (Motacilla cinerea), grey heron (Ardea cinerea) and kingfisher (Alcedo atthis) are regular visitors or resident. Especially in freezing weather, the disused cress-beds can yield waders: most often snipe (Gallinago gallinago), but also redshank (Tringa totanus) and green sandpiper (Tringa ochropus) and, more rarely, jack snipe (Lymnocryptes minimus) and dunlin (Calidris alpina). Water pipit (Anthus spinoletta) may also be found here in winter, and in January 1965, on some cress-ditches which have now been filled in, up to four spotted crakes (Porzana porzana) were present. The valley is a good place to see willow tit (Parus montanus), reed bunting (Emberiza schoeniclus), and sedge warbler (Acrocephalus schoenobaenus). The alders attract flocks of siskin (Carduelis spinus) and redpoll (C. flammea). Lesser spotted woodpecker (Dendrocopos minor) is frequent. Some of the old ditches and surrounding woodland have been made into a local nature reserve. Marsh marigold (Caltha palustris) grows here, and there is a fairly large bed of great reed-mace (Typha latifolia).

An obvious feature of the riverside flora are three species of balsams: small balsam (Impatiens parviflora), jewel-weed (I. capensis), and policeman's helmet (I. glandulifera). These are said to be escapes from the canal-wharves, where they arrived with consignments of imported timber.

== Filming location ==
Cassiobury Park has been used as a filming location in a number of cinema films and television programmes due to its proximity to several major film studios such as Elstree Studios. In 1997 Whippendell Wood served as a Star Wars filming location when it provided the backdrop of a forest on the planet Naboo which featured in the scene in Star Wars: Episode I – The Phantom Menace, in which Qui-Gon Jinn (Liam Neeson) and his Jedi apprentice Obi-Wan Kenobi (Ewan McGregor) first meet Jar Jar Binks (Ahmed Best).
