= The Apotheosis of Catherine of Braganza =

Ceiling painting by Antonio Verrio

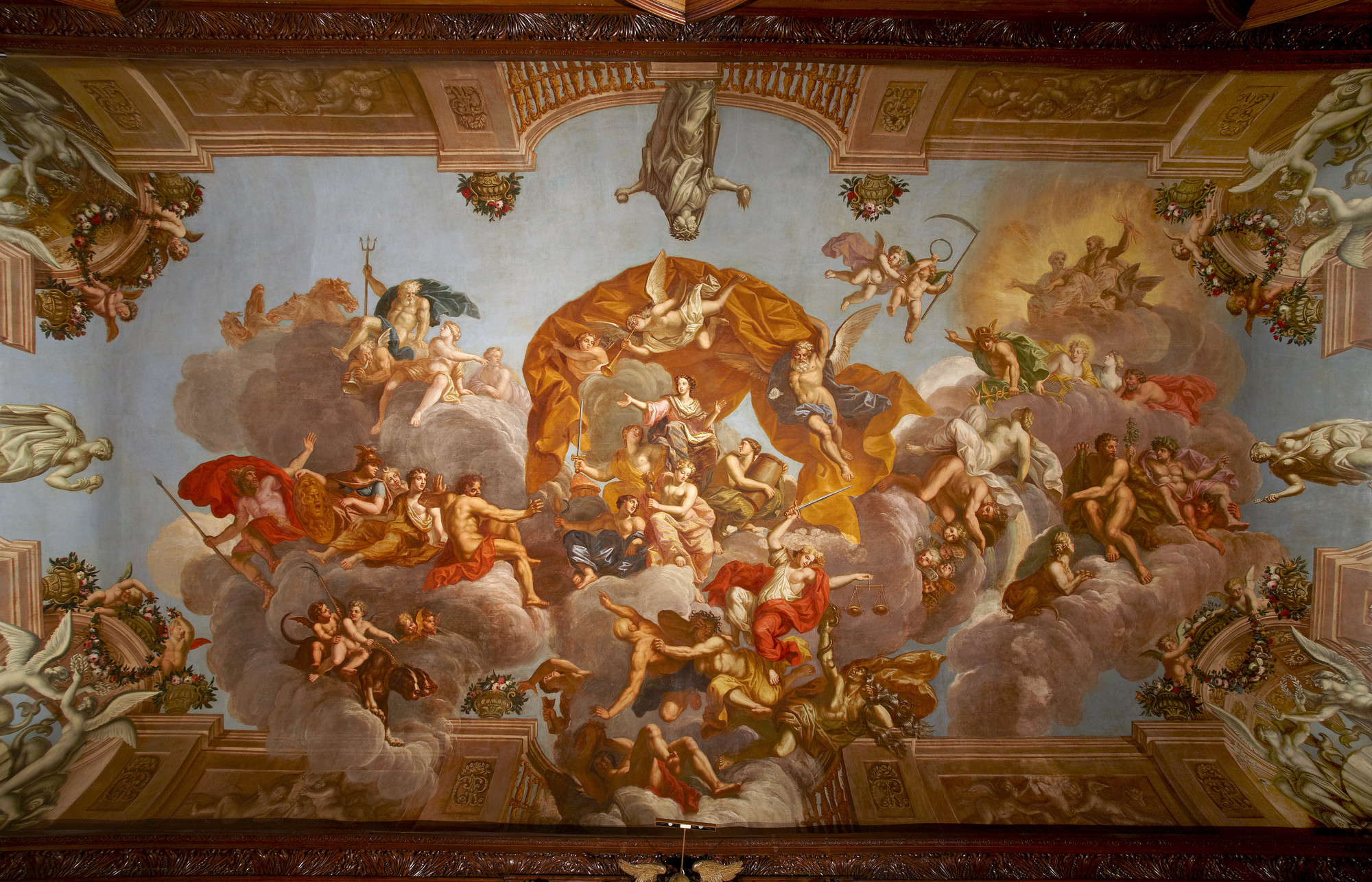
- Artist: Antonio Verrio
- Year: 1675-c.1684
- Medium: Fresco
- Subject: Catherine of Braganza
- Location: Windsor Castle, Windsor
- Owner: Royal Collection
- Accession: RCIN 408427
- Website: Royal Collection

The Apotheosis of Catherine of Braganza is a ceiling painting by Antonio Verrio, at Windsor Castle. It is one of three that survived, of the original twenty, mostly destroyed during George IV's nineteenth century reconstruction of the castle.

== The painting ==
The painting depicts Catherine of Braganza, the wife of Charles II, seated under a billowing canopy, and surrounded by allegorical figures.

It is located in the Queen's Presence Chamber in Windsor Castle.
