= Whippendell Wood =

Ancient woodland in Watford, England

Coordinates: 51.67°N 0.445°W

- Site of Special Scientific Interest
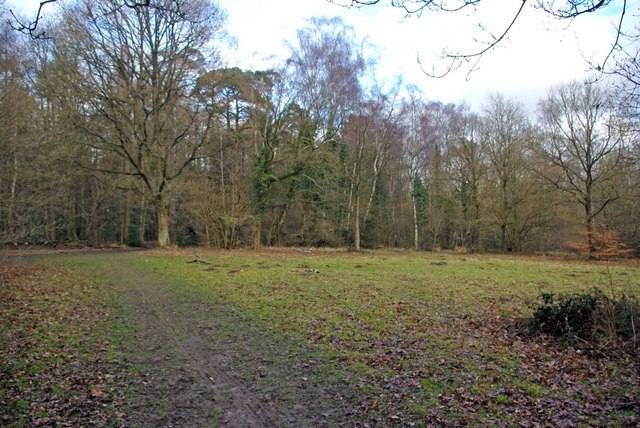
- Glade in Whippendell Wood
- Location of Whippendell Wood.
- Area of search: Hertfordshire
- Grid reference: TQ076978
- Interest: Biological
- Area: 66.9 ha (165 acres)
- Notification date: 1984
- Location map: Magic Map

Whippendell Wood (or Whippendell Woods) is an ancient woodland on the edges of Watford, England, covering an area of 165.3 acres (66.9 ha). It is owned and managed by Watford Borough Council. It is a Site of Special Scientific Interest, and has held this status since 1954. Its present name comes from the Anglo-Saxon name "Wippa denu", meaning "Wippa's valley".

== History ==
Whippendell Wood is an ancient woodland, meaning it has been continuously wooded since at least 1600. The wood was formerly part of the Cassiobury estate. There is an avenue of lime trees dating back to 1672, which runs diagonally through the wood. The northern section of the wood was replanted at some point in the 18th or 19th century. Other phases of clearing and replanting followed in the 1940s and 1960s. In 1987, a storm damaged many of the trees in the wood.

== Wildlife ==
Whippendell Wood has been designated a Site of Special Scientific Interest, due to its diverse range of fungi and invertebrates. Originally, it was listed in 1954 with Harrocks Wood, but was declared as an SSSI on its own in 1986.

=== Flora ===
A range of trees can be found in the wood, which is predominantly composed of oak, beech, ash and silver birch. There are also a significant number of cherry, hawthorn, hazel, holly and hornbeam trees. Sycamore trees are also found in the wood, but these are being felled as part of a management plan, as they are not native to the area.

The wood is known for its bluebells, which are particularly prominent in April–May. There are also a few rare species of fungus, including Crepidotus cinnabarinus, which has only been recorded on three other occasions in the whole of Europe. First noted in the wood in 1995, samples are now kept at Kew Gardens.

=== Fauna ===
The wood is home to a number of bird species, including great spotted, lesser spotted and green woodpeckers, tawny owls and sparrow hawks. Mammals found in the wood include bats, badgers, and deer, namely muntjac and possibly roe deer.

== Present use ==
The wood is open to the public, and there are several footpaths and orienteering routes through the wood. The wood is popular with dog walkers, and is also used as a shortcut to Cassiobury Park. Horses are not permitted into the wood, but a track for horse riders runs around the perimeter.

Whippendell Wood has been used as a filming location for Star Wars; exterior shots for scenes set on the planet Naboo were filmed here for the 1999 prequel, The Phantom Menace. This was also a filming location for Return to Oz, being the site of Dorothy's old house and the ruins of the yellow brick road. Whippendell has also featured in television series such as Holby City and Silent Witness.

Watford Borough Council own the wood, with their maintenance funded by income from filming and the Forestry Commission.

== See also ==
- List of Sites of Special Scientific Interest in Hertfordshire
