= Mos Eisley =

Fictional city in Star Wars

- Interior set of the Mos Eisley Cantina with cast of aliens, as seen in Star Wars (1977)
- First appearance: Star Wars: From the Adventures of Luke Skywalker (novel); Star Wars (film)
- Last appearance: The Book of Boba Fett (TV series)
- Created by: George Lucas; John Mollo
- Genre: Space opera

In-universe information
- Type: Spaceport
- Races: Humans; various non-human species
- Location: Planet Tatooine
- Characters: Wuher, Han Solo, Chewbacca, Greedo, Ponda Baba, Doctor Evazan, Figrin D'an and the Modal Nodes, The Mandalorian, Garindan

Mos Eisley is a spaceport town in the fictional Star Wars universe. Located on the planet Tatooine, it first appeared in the 1977 film Star Wars, described by the character Obi-Wan Kenobi (played by Alec Guinness) as a "wretched hive of scum and villainy".

A scene set in a seedy Mos Eisley cantina crowded with numerous alien races made a particular impact on audiences. Location filming for the spaceport took place from 1975 to 1976 in Tunisia, with interiors filmed at Elstree Studios near London.

== Depiction ==
=== Film ===
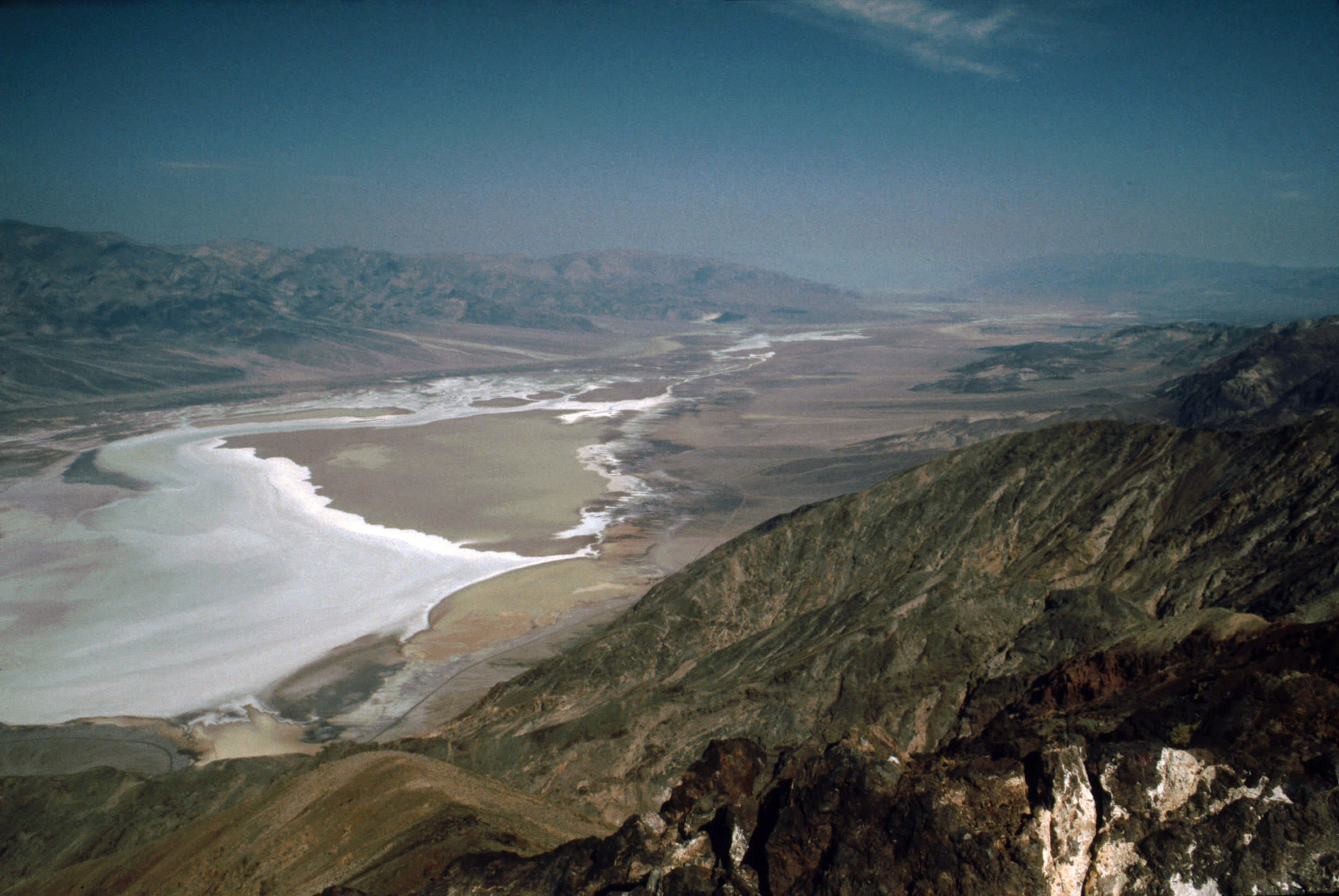
Dante's View, overlooking Death Valley, was used as the establishing shot for Mos Eisley in Star Wars (1977).

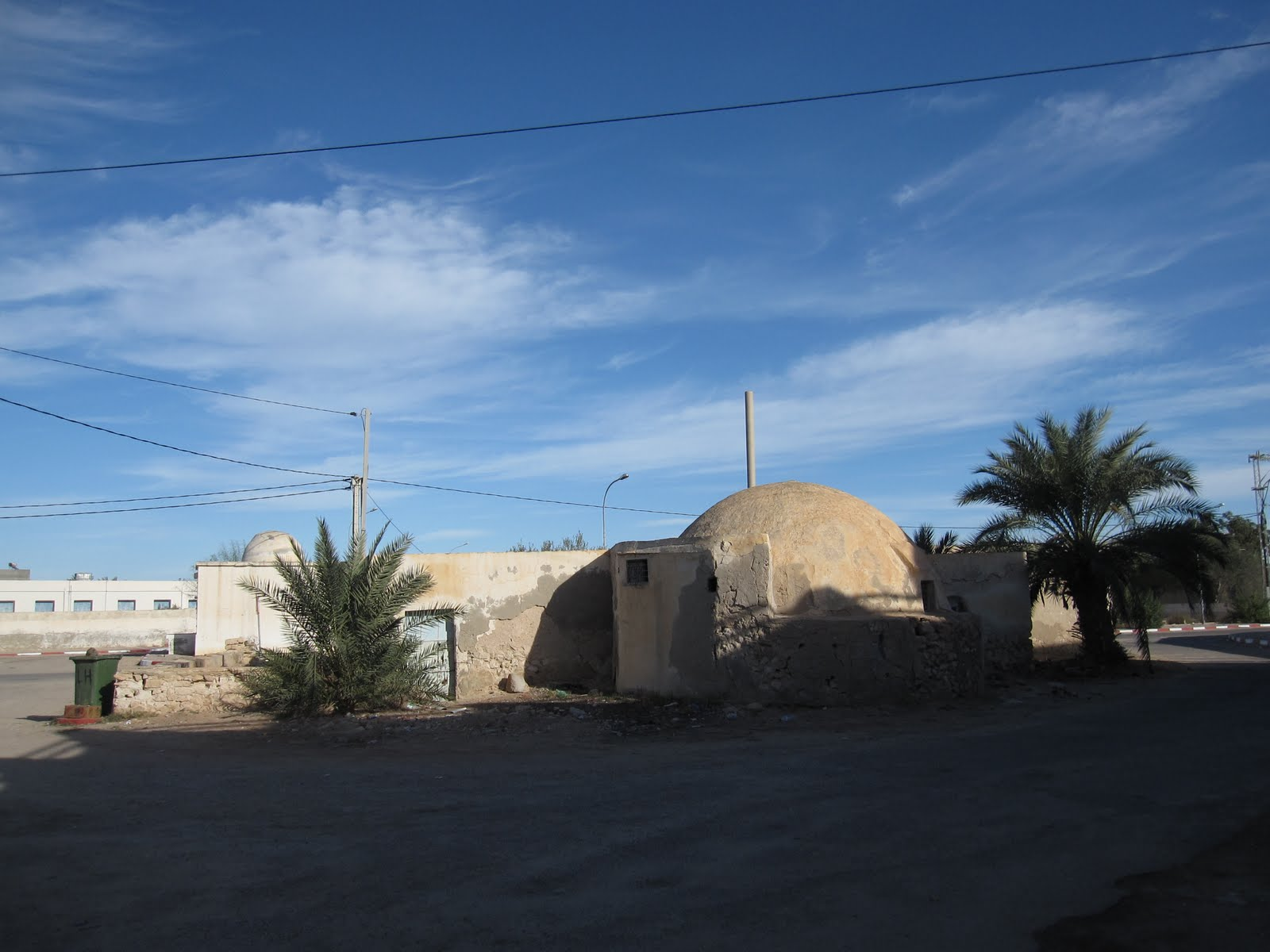
Filming location in Ajim, Tunisia for the Mos Eisley Cantina for Star Wars (1977)

Mos Eisley made its first appearance in the original 1977 film, Star Wars. It is depicted as a busy, bustling port city situated in a desert plain, populated with transients of all species. The lawless spaceport attracts criminals, smugglers and fugitives. Spacecraft land at docking bays dotted across the city.

The Mos Eisley scenes occur early in Star Wars, when the young hero Luke Skywalker and his mentor Obi-Wan Kenobi travel to the spaceport in Luke's landspeeder in search of a pilot, accompanied by the droids, C-3PO and R2-D2. Obi-Wan warns Luke that the spaceport may be dangerous. Upon arrival, Luke and Obi-Wan enter Chalmun's Cantina, a dimly-lit tavern patronised by visiting starship pilots. Strong drink is on sale at the bar and there are frequent outbreaks of violence among the clientele. The cantina attracts a range of exotic alien species, although droids are not permitted to enter; the bartender orders them to leave, saying "We don't serve their kind in here". A band of dome-headed aliens plays a set of jazz-style music. Luke is threatened with violence by two of the customers, Ponda Baba, an Aqualish, and Doctor Evazan, a deformed human and mentally unstable surgeon, but Obi-Wan intervenes with his lightsaber, severing Ponda's right arm in the fight. This is the first time a lightsaber is used in combat on-screen in the Star Wars franchise. Obi-Wan introduces Luke to a pair of smugglers, Chewbacca and Han Solo, and they negotiate terms for passage to the planet Alderaan, which prompts Luke to sell his landspeeder to get the money they need to pay Han. After Luke and Obi-Wan have departed, Han is involved in a brief confrontation with Greedo, a green-skinned gangster; the exchange ends violently when Han shoots and kills Greedo. As the group prepare to leave, they are followed to Docking Bay 94 by Garindan, a spy working for the Empire. Following a brief gunfight with Imperial stormtroopers, they board the Millennium Falcon spaceship and take off from Tatooine.

=== Books ===
In the novelization of the film, Star Wars: From the Adventures of Luke Skywalker by George Lucas (ghostwritten by Alan Dean Foster), Mos Eisley is described as a haphazard, run-down settlement built of concrete and sandstone, a large part of it built underground to escape the heat of Tatooine's twin suns. The cantina is described as a dark, sinister bar full of "one-eyed creatures and thousand-eyed, creatures with scales, creatures with fur". The narrative describes "Tentacles, claws and hands... wrapped around drinking utensils".

The Expanded Universe anthology of intertwined short stories, Tales from the Mos Eisley Cantina, edited by Kevin J. Anderson, explores the cantina and its clientele further. The book names the establishment as "Chalmun's Cantina", introducing its proprietor as a Wookiee named Chalmun; it also reveals that the bartender is named Wuher. The book also explores the reasons for the cantina's ban on droids: the bartender claims to dislike everyone, but lashes out at droids because they are the only thing that will not try to fight back; the proprietor Chalmun does not tolerate droids because they do not drink, and therefore occupy valuable space. The backstory of the cantina's resident swing band is also expanded in the short stories "We Don't Do Weddings: The Band's Tale" by Kathy Tyers and "Empire Blues" by Daniel Keys Moran. The band is named as Figrin D'an and the Modal Nodes and it is revealed that the players belong to a race called Bith. Their main musical number is also given a title, "Mad About Me".

=== Television ===
Mos Eisley appears in the 2019 Star Wars television series, The Mandalorian. In "Chapter 5: The Gunslinger", the Mandalorian is forced to set down in Mos Eisley for repairs after a space battle with another bounty hunter. In order to pay for the repairs, the Mandalorian goes to a local cantina to look for a bounty. There, he meets a rookie bounty hunter, Toro Calican, who hires him to help locate Fennec Shand, a dangerous mercenary. The pair locate Shand just beyond the Dune Sea and apprehend her. However, when the Mandalorian goes to retrieve transport for them, Shand tries to turn Calican against him by telling Calican about the Mandalorian turning against the bounty hunter guild to rescue the child. Calican mortally wounds Shand and decides to capture the Mandalorian and the child and collect all three bounties. The Mandalorian, however, is able to overcome Calican and rescue the child and Peli, a mechanic that was repairing his ship and watching the child. The Mandalorian gives Peli the reward for Shand as payment for the repairs and he and the child depart Tatooine.

== Production ==
=== Filming ===
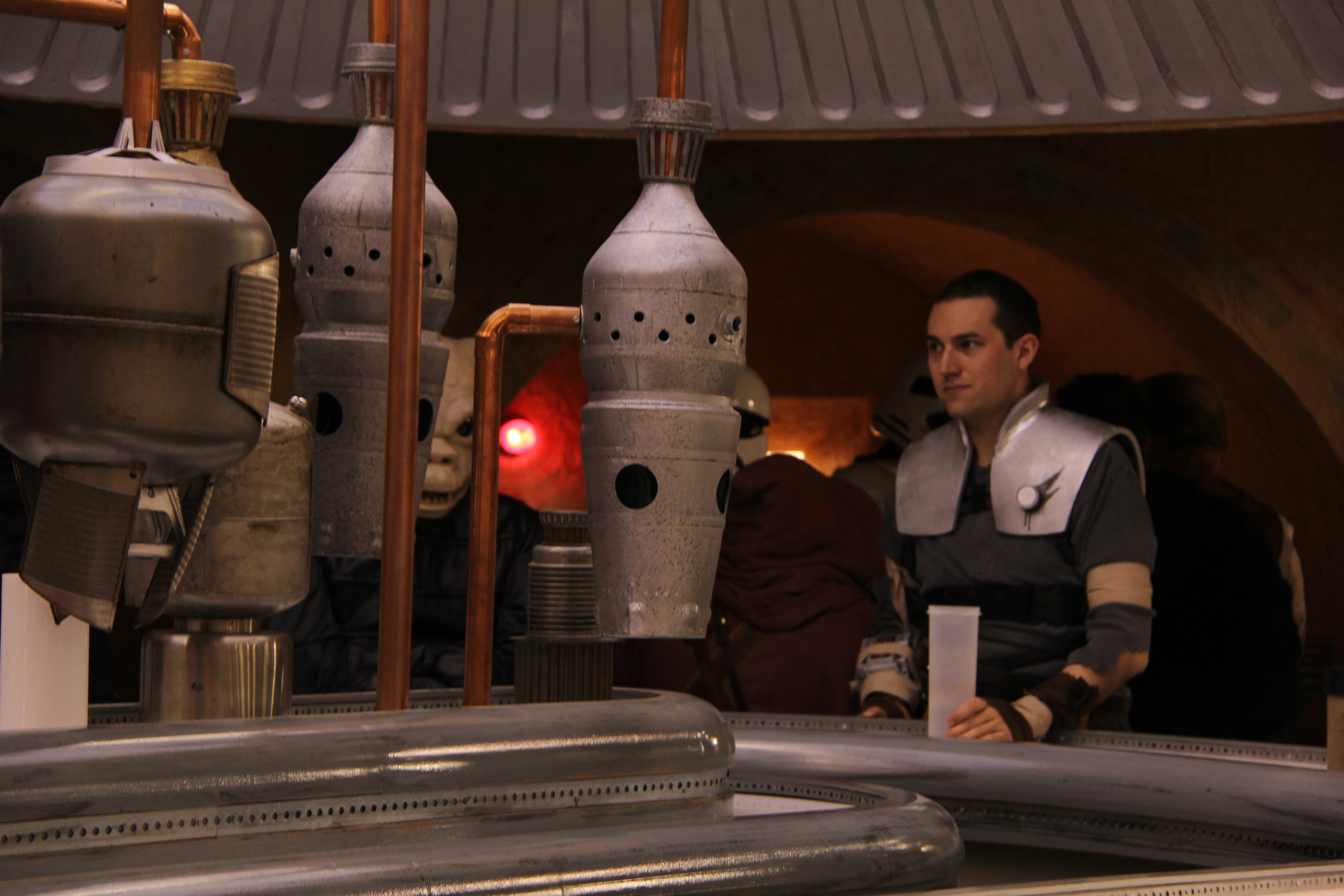
Reproduction of the Cantina set at Star Wars Celebration, Anaheim (Note: The hanging props seen depict those which were reused in the design of IG-88 in The Empire Strikes Back (1980).)

The first view of Mos Eisley in Star Wars is a shot of Death Valley in California from the Dante's View lookout, with a matte painting added in the distance. The actual filming on location took place on the Tunisian island of Djerba.

In 1975, during the early stages of production on Star Wars, the appearance of the Mos Eisley cantina and its clientele was realized through the work of concept arts Ron Cobb, Rick Baker and Ralph McQuarrie and costume designer John Mollo. Mollo worked with George Lucas to compile a chart of visual designs for a range of character types. In collaboration with Mollo, make-up artist Stuart Freeborn designed the masks and prosthetics to match each of the costumes, along with Doug Beswick, Rick Baker, Phil Tippett, Nick Maley, and Christopher Tucker. Freeborn has remarked that the cantina scene was specifically set up to be a "shock" scene; until this point in the film, there had been few appearances of non-human creatures, and the entrance into the cantina suddenly presented the audience with an array of outlandish species. Working from Lucas's direction and a maquette, set designer John Barry created the cantina set complete with circular bar and shady alcoves. Mollo included a few costumes borrowed from Westerns, and based some other costumes on characters from the 1950 film Destination Moon and the 1960s television series Lost in Space. The alien musicians in the band were played by a number of the Industrial Light & Magic crew, including Phil Tippett, Jon Berg, Rick Baker, who all mimed to the Benny Goodman tune "Sing, Sing, Sing" at George Lucas's suggestion.

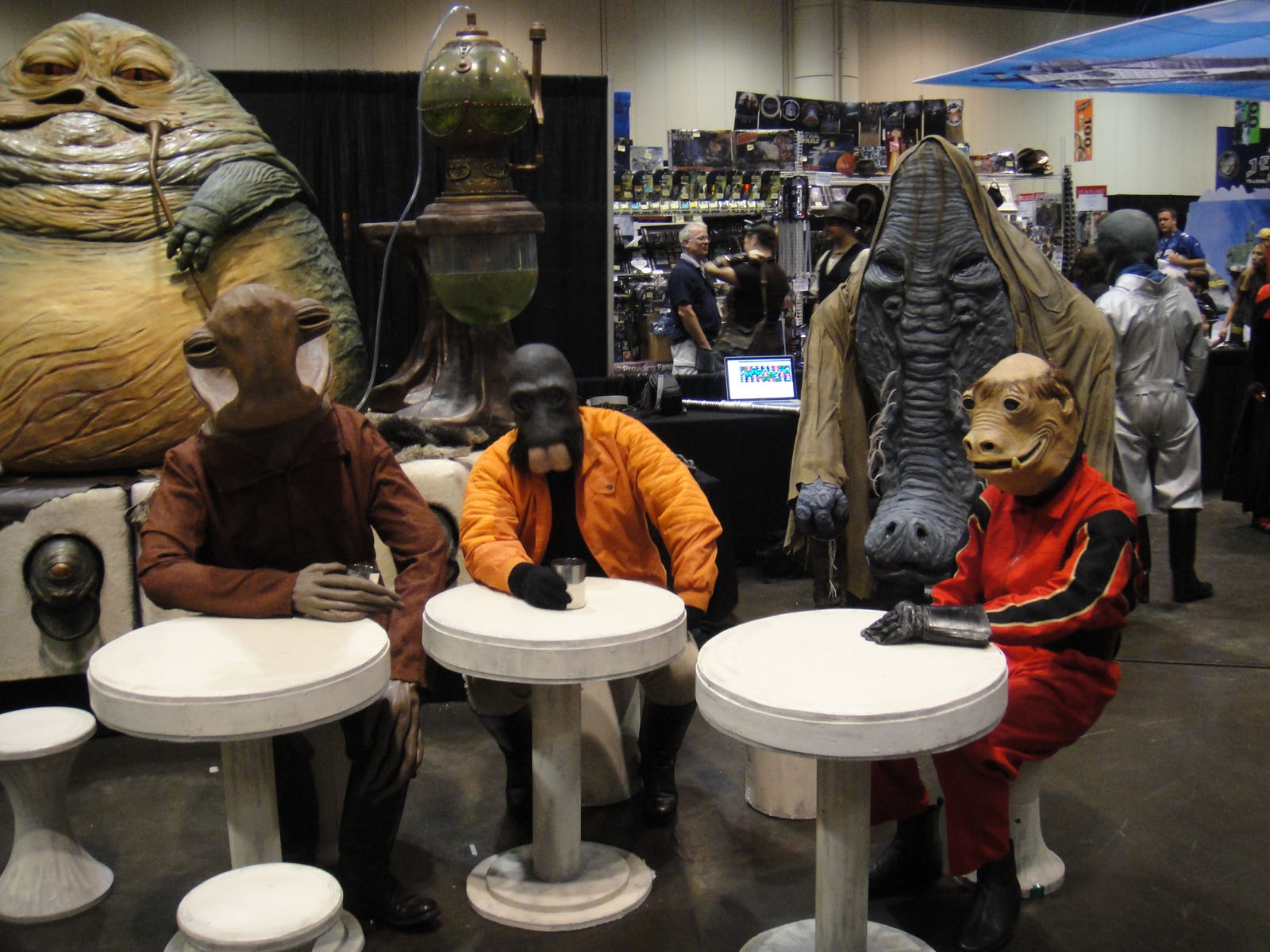
In the foreground, a selection of creatures who appeared in the cantina

The exterior scene was initially filmed in 1976 at the little town of Ajim, which is a fishing port on the Isle of Djerba, Tunisia. The film crew added some false frontage to the structure, which has seen no refurbishment since 1976. The local owner was reimbursed eight dollars a day. The interior set was constructed and filmed on Stage 6, Elstree Studios near London. Harrison Ford filmed his first scene with Alec Guinness; Ford later remarked that the prospect of working with Guinness "scared the shit out of me". As filming progressed, Lucas encountered many problems; the production was running over-budget and both cast and crew were suffering health problems. Stuart Freeborn fell ill and was unable to complete his work on the cantina creature masks.

In early 1977, under pressure to complete his movie (now more than $2 million over budget), Lucas negotiated limited additional funding from 20th Century Studios executives to support second unit filming. Some of the most important additional footage shot was to enhance the cantina scene at Hollywood Center Studios. Lucas had been dissatisfied with the make-up in previous shots due to Freeborn's illness, and was now able to fully realize the scene with several close-ups of alien creatures, complete with Freeborn's masks. Lucas also supplemented the limited coverage he had from the Tunisia footage with footage from Death Valley. The new material was cut into the film by Lucas's editors, including Lucas's then-wife, Marcia Lucas.

Lucas remained dissatisfied with the final cut of the cantina scene, and beginning with Lucasfilm's release of the Special Edition of Star Wars in 1997, made a number of changes to it. He adjusted the confrontation between Han Solo and Greedo, to portray Greedo firing at Han first. This change was repeatedly further altered and has proved one of the most controversial among Star Wars fans, giving rise to the popular slogan "Han shot first" in protest of it. For the 2004 DVD, the opening sequence of the cantina scene was modified to replace some practical creatures with completely new computer-generated aliens. This includes, for example, a sinister werewolf-like creature, which was replaced by a pipe-smoking reptile.

=== Music ===
Throughout the cantina scenes in Star Wars, there is constant background music played by an alien band. This diegetic music was composed for the film by John Williams, and consisted of two pieces written for trumpet, three saxophones, clarinet, Rhodes piano and percussion, along with steelpan and synthesizer. George Lucas briefed Williams to imagine "several creatures in a future century finding some 1930s Benny Goodman swing band music ... and how they might attempt to interpret it". Williams combined traditional jazz instruments with instruments associated with Afro-Caribbean music in order to create a sound that was "both alien and yet familiar at the same time."

== Spin-off merchandise ==
=== Toys ===
In 1978, the toy manufacturer Kenner Products released a Cantina Adventure Set as part of its range of Star Wars action figures. The playset consisted of a miniature plastic bar with a cardboard backdrop depicting various cantina creatures and an Imperial stormtrooper. A second version of the playset was brought to market in 1979, named the Creature Cantina Action Playset.

In September 2020, LEGO Released a Master Builder Series (MBS) Mos Eisley Cantina (set number: 75290). It featured 3,187 pieces, 21 Minifigures and cost USD/EUR 349.99.

=== Music releases ===
The first piece of music from the Cantina scene was released in 1977 on the Star Wars Original Motion Picture Soundtrack, entitled simply "Cantina Band". Later CD re-releases of the soundtrack album included the second piece, which was titled "Cantina Band #2". The first "Cantina Band" number has since been retitled "Mad About Me".

That same year, the record producer Meco released a space disco version of the Star Wars title theme and "Cantina Band" on his single "Star Wars Theme/Cantina Band". Since then, numerous popular cover versions and parodies have been released which feature the "Cantina Band" melody, including "Cantina Band" (1995) by the rock band Ash, as the B-side of their single "Girl from Mars"; "Digga Digga Doo" (2004) by the Asylum Street Spankers, from their 2004 album Mercurial; and "Cantina" (2007) by Aurelio Voltaire from his album Ooky Spooky; A bluegrass version of the theme is heard during the bar scene in the 2011 film Paul, recorded by Syd Masters and The Swing Riders.

== Legacy ==
In 1979, the cantina was the setting of a drunk driving PSA produced by the U.S. Department of Transportation's National Highway and Safety Administration. In the PSA, Muftak's friends help him stagger out of the cantina and the message "Friends Don't Let Friends Drive Drunk" is shown.

In 2010, clothing company Adidas created a FIFA World Cup advertisement featuring electronic music duo Daft Punk, Snoop Dogg, David Beckham, and others inserted into a reimagined version of the 1977 scene. The ad won a Golden Pencil award at the 2011 One Show Interactive.
