= Ajim =

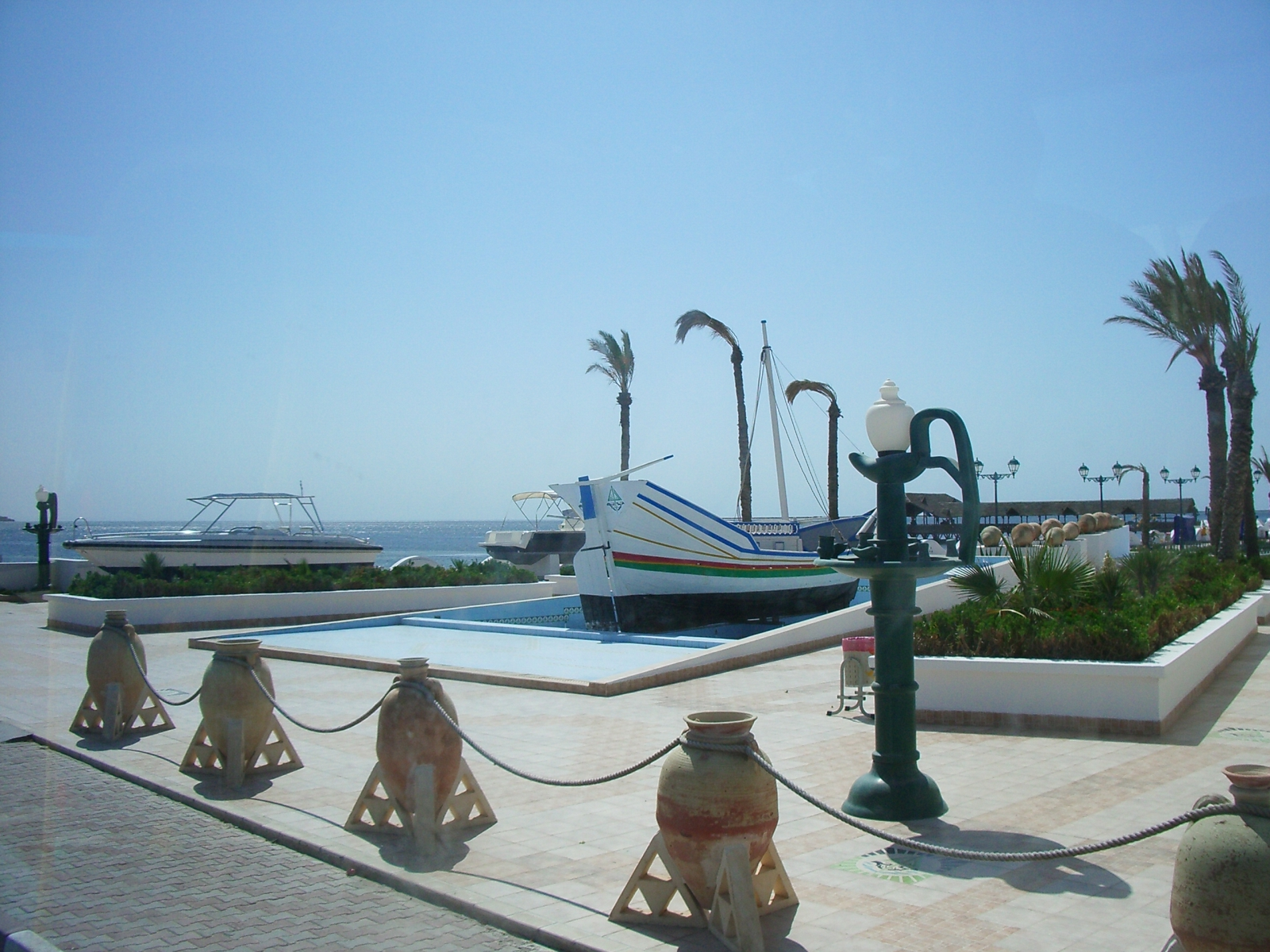
- Nickname: Ajim
- Location in Tunisia
- Coordinates: 33°43′N 10°45′E
- Country: Tunisia
- Governorate: Medenine Governorate

Population (2014)
  - Total: 24,294
- Time zone: UTC1 (CET)

Ajim (Arabic: أجيم Aǧīm) is a commune and port located on the Island of Djerba off the coast of Tunisia. It is Djerba's main fishing port and the closest city to the African continent. It had a population of 24,294 at the 2014 census.

== Star Wars filming location ==
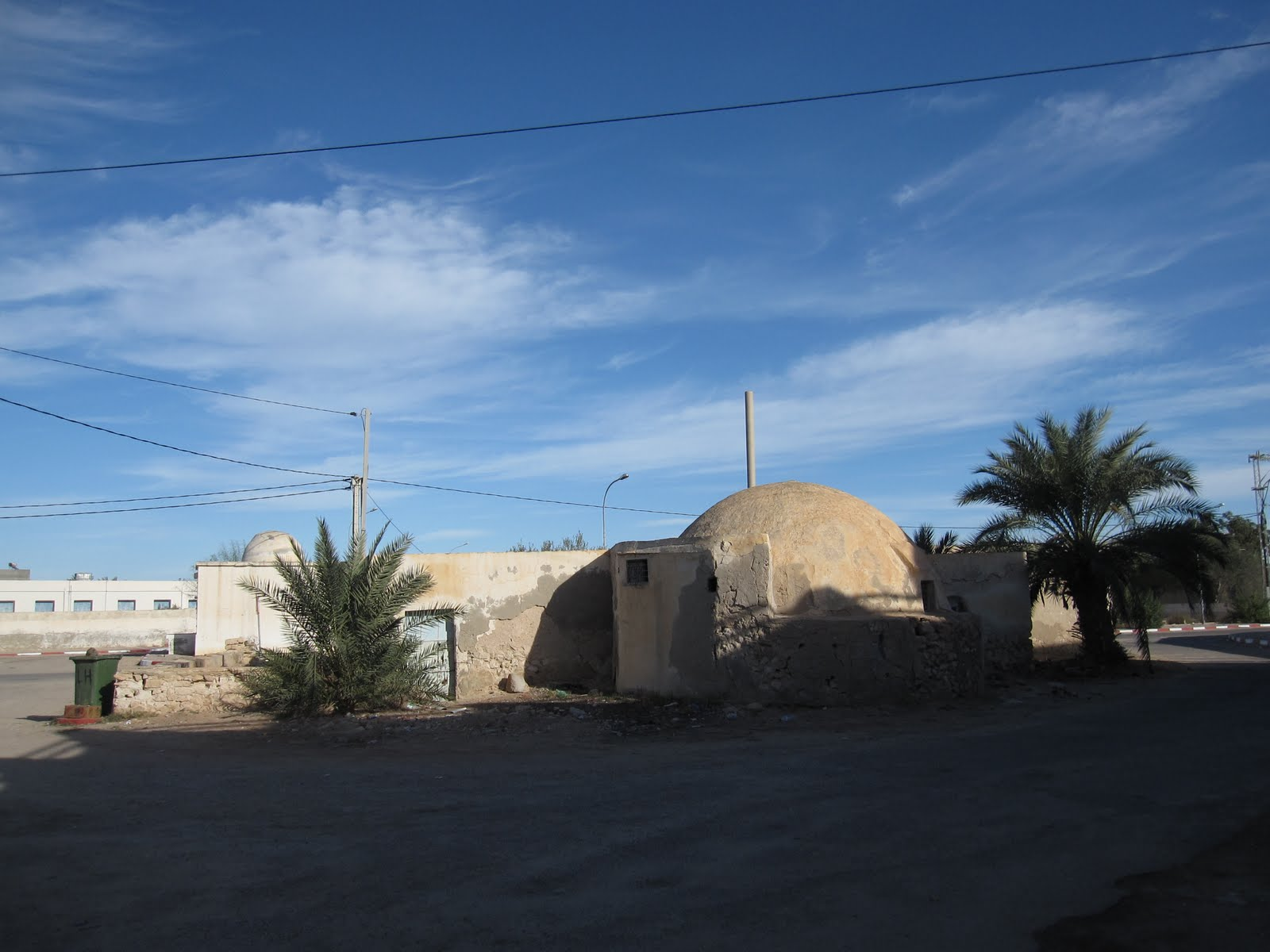
Filming location for the "Mos Eisley Cantina" for Star Wars (1977) in Ajm.

The city and surrounding areas were used as filming locations for Star Wars. Tourists can visit buildings featured in the original movie, including Obi-Wan Kenobi's house and the Mos Eisley cantina.

== Topographic map and satellite view ==
Djerba topographic map in French.

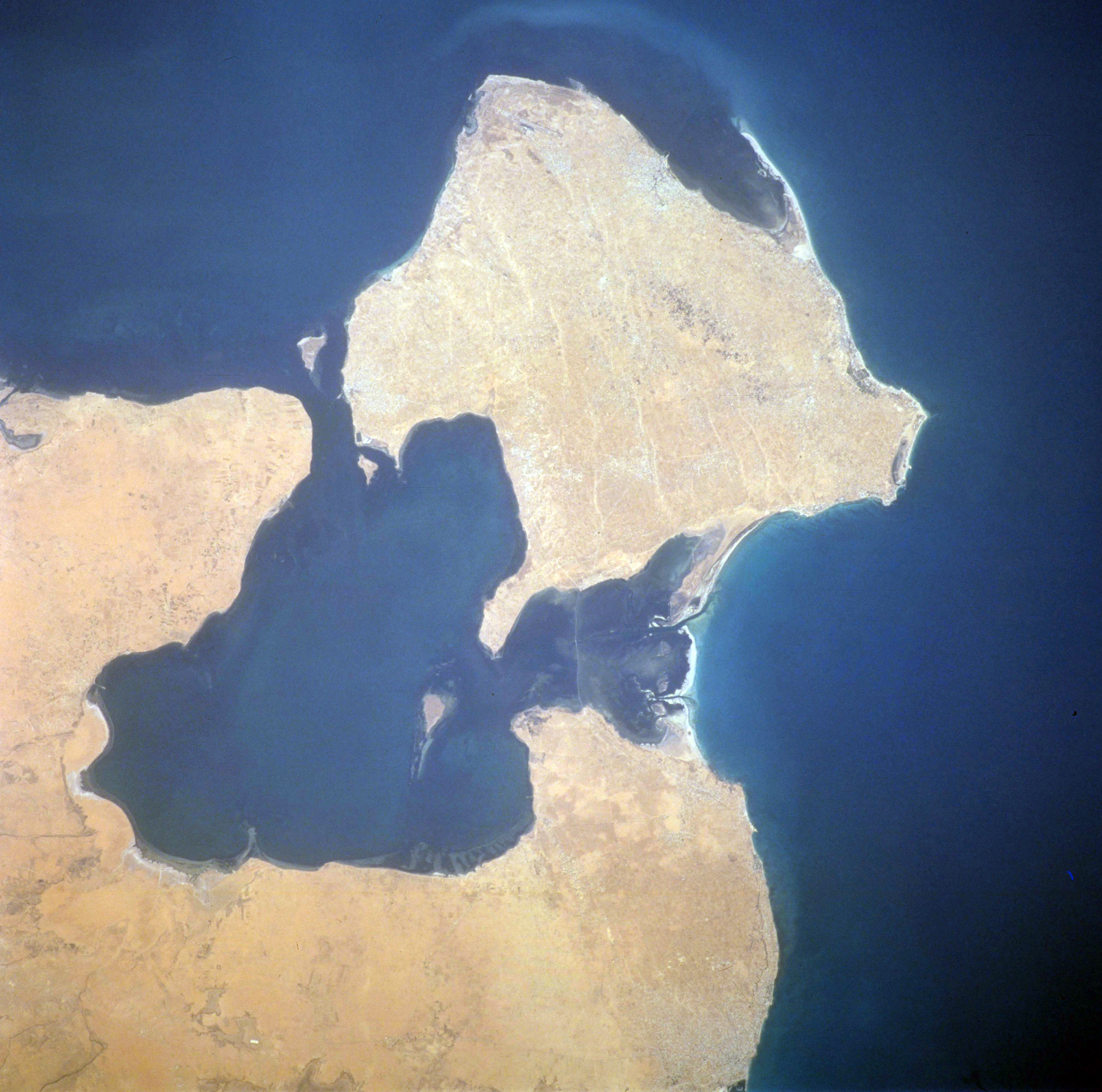
Djerba satellite view.
