= Antonio Verrio =

Italian painter

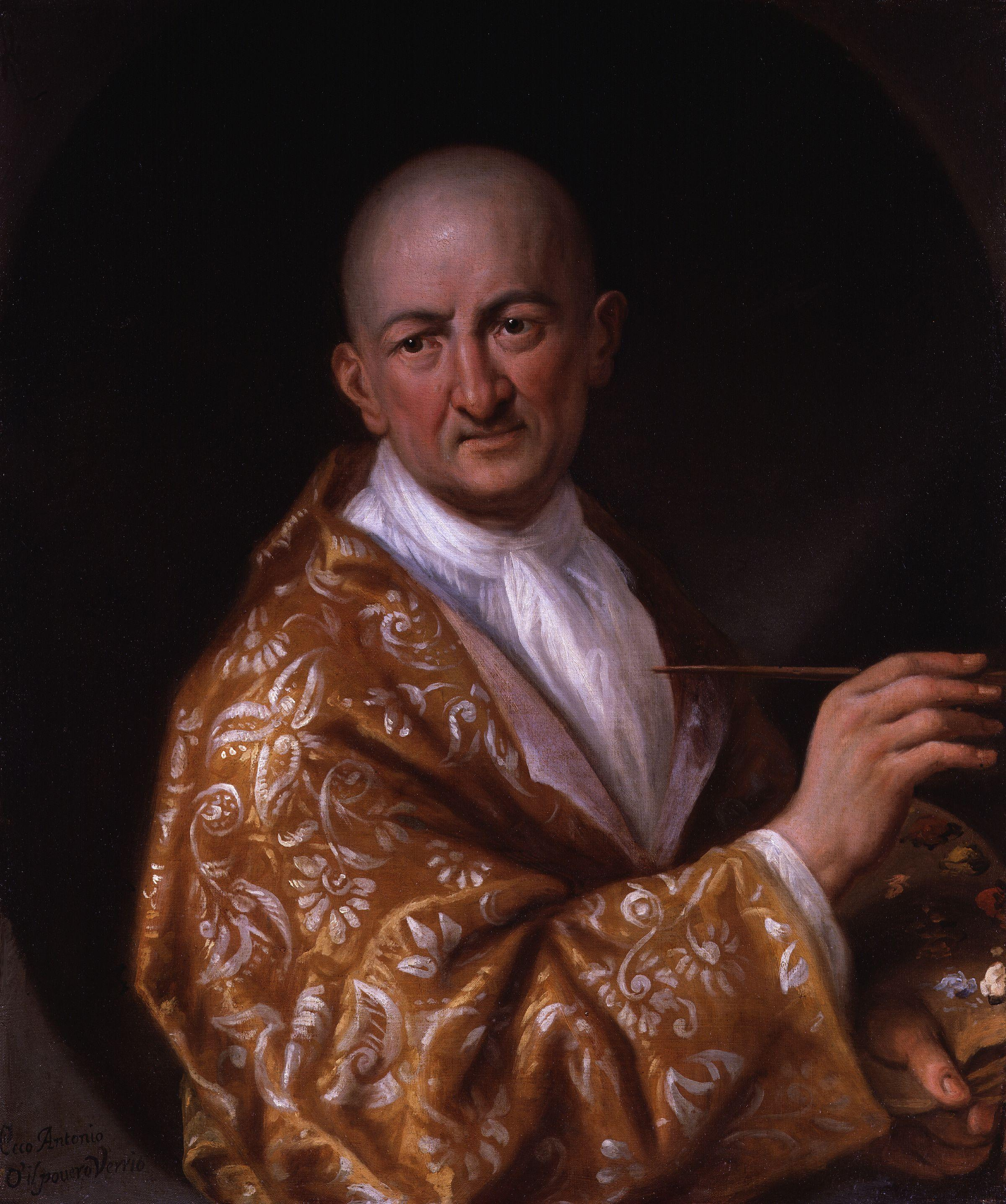
- Self-portrait of Antonio Verrio circa 1705/6
- Born: 1636; Lecce
- Died: 15 June 1707; Hampton Court, England
- Known for: Painting
- Movement: Baroque

Antonio Verrio (c. 1636 – 15 June 1707) was an Italian Baroque painter. He was responsible for introducing Baroque mural painting into England and served the Crown over a thirty-year period.

== Career ==
Verrio, born in Lecce, Kingdom of Naples, started his career in Lecce and was a pupil of Giovanni Andrea Coppola (1597–1659). Several works by Verrio still exist in the Apulian city, including S. Francesco Saverio appare al Beato Marcello Mastrilli – his first known signed work.

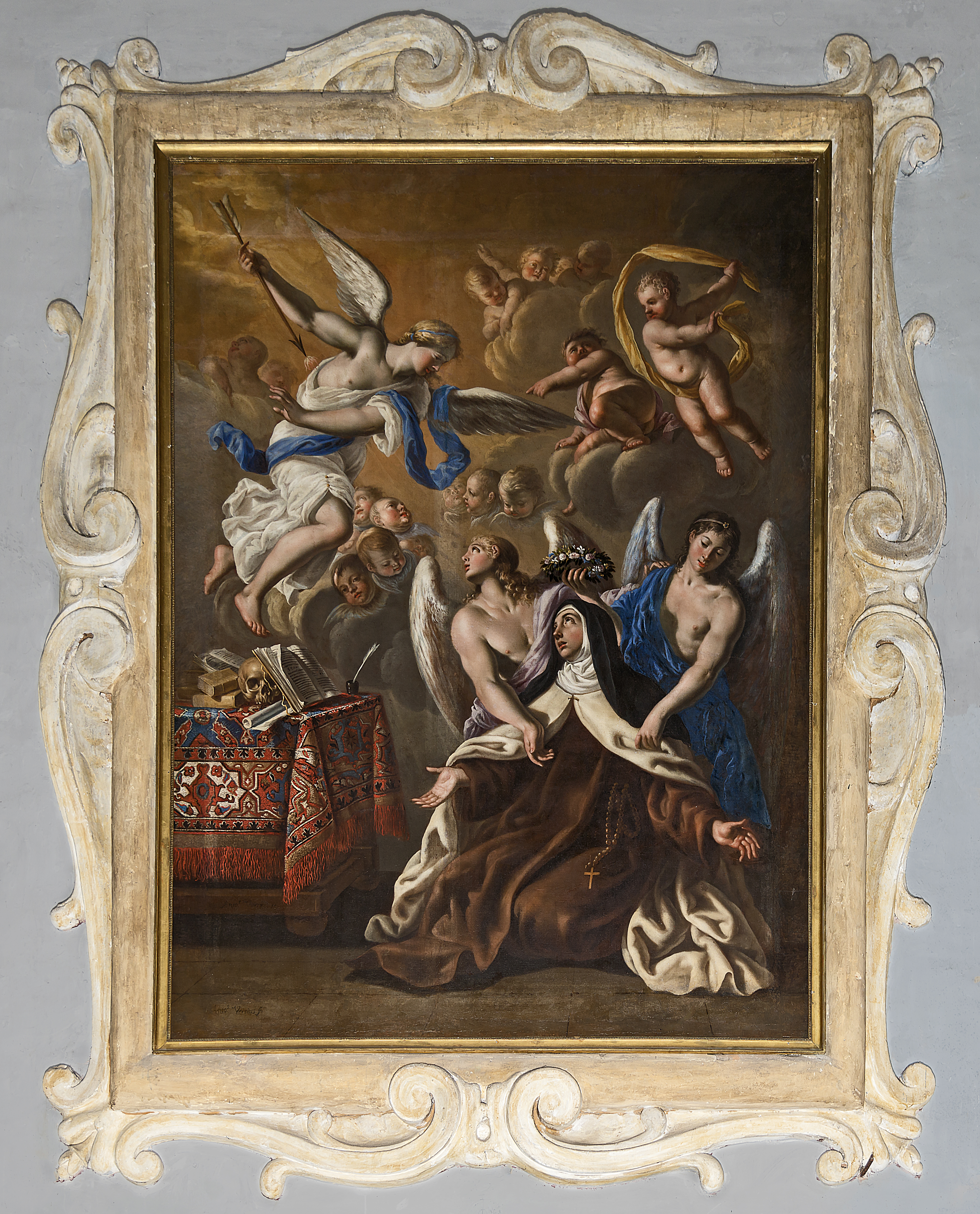
La Transverbération de sainte Thérèse, Church Saint-Exupère, in Toulouse

Around 1665, Verrio moved to the region of Toulouse where he was commissioned to decorate the Château de Bonrepos, the property of Pierre-Paul Riquet, promoter of the Canal du Midi. He then settled in Toulouse itself where he worked for the Discalced Carmelites and the Capuchins. Today two of his paintings, Le Mariage de la Vierge and Saint-Félix de Cantalice, are in the collection of the Musée des Augustins there. Around 1670, Verrio moved to Paris where he developed an aristocratic clientele and decorated three private houses including the Hotel Brûlart – the only one that still exists today (in private hands).

In March 1672, Verrio crossed the English Channel on the recommendation of Ralph Montagu (later Duke of Montagu), who had been English Ambassador Extraordinary in Paris since 1669. Thanks to Montagu, Verrio made his English debut working for aristocrats such as Henry Bennet, 1st Earl of Arlington (Euston Hall and Arlington House, now destroyed) and John Maitland, 1st Duke of Lauderdale (Ham House, now a property of the National Trust), and rapidly acquired the royal patronage of Charles II.

By 1675, Verrio had painted the exquisite allegorical portrait of the King known as The Sea Triumph of Charles II, and was 'denizened' on 5 May of that year. Soon afterwards he was engaged to decorate the North Range of Windsor Castle, where he collaborated with the architect Hugh May and the sculptor Grinling Gibbons. This was the most important commission of his entire career: twenty ceilings, three staircases, the King's Chapel and St George's Hall for which he was paid the colossal sum of £10195 8s 4d. On its completion, in 1684, Verrio was appointed Chief First Painter. Only three ceilings have survived the redecoration of the castle commissioned by George IV during the 1820s.

On the succession of James II, Verrio continued his royal service and decorated Whitehall Palace (burnt in 1698) and Henry VIII's Chapel at Windsor (destroyed). In March 1685, he was also appointed "Keeper of the Great Garden in St James's Park". At the Glorious Revolution, Verrio received no royal protection from William III and had to leave the court.

Verrio, who had worked for the nobility while he was employed by Charles and James, returned to his aristocratic clientele. He spent the next decade at Burghley House, the property of John Cecil, 5th Earl of Exeter, and Chatsworth House, the property of William Cavendish, 4th Earl of Devonshire. Both are very fine examples of English Baroque decoration, and Burghley contains Verrio's masterpiece, the Heaven Room. By 1699, William finally overrode the Test Act and invited Verrio back to court. After having worked at Windsor again, Verrio undertook the decoration of Hampton Court Palace for William. At his death, in 1702, Verrio continued his royal service and painted for Queen Anne his last royal commission in the Queen's Drawing Room. In 1705, Verrio was granted by the Queen an annual pension of £200 and allowed to keep his lodgings at Hampton Court. Before his death, on 15 June 1707, Verrio painted a series of portraits including his self-portrait, now in the National Portrait Gallery, London.

Verrio influenced younger artists such as Louis Laguerre and James Thornhill, and his Hampton Court Palace frescoes (now under the care of Historic Royal Palaces) constitute a priceless legacy.

== Personal life ==
Verrio was noted for being a notorious womaniser who chased cooks and maids around Burghley where he lived.

== Verrio's work ==
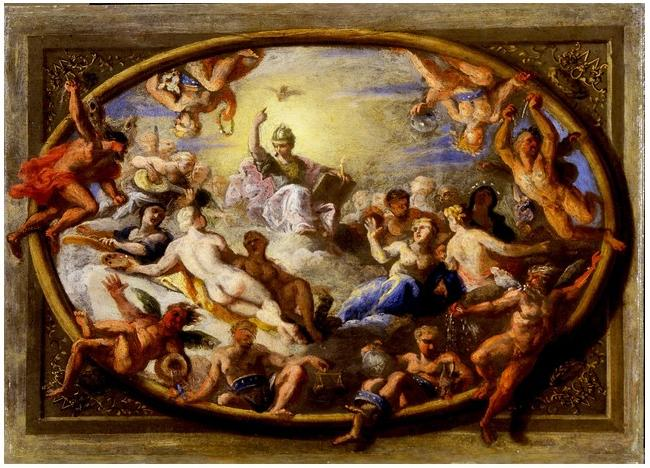
Sketch for the Ceiling of the Banqueting House, Hampton Court Palace, about 1700, Antonio Verrio, Victoria and Albert Museum, London (E.1085–1916)

Verrio's surviving decorative work in England and Wales can be seen at Burghley House, Chatsworth House, Reigate Priory, Royal Hospital Chelsea, Christ's Hospital, Ham House, Hampton Court Palace, Moor Park, Powis Castle, Snape Castle (although in very bad condition) and Windsor Castle. Some of his paintings, sketches and drawings belong to various collections including the British Museum, Fitzwilliam Museum, Cambridge, National Portrait Gallery, London, Northampton Museum and Art Gallery, Royal Collection and the Victoria and Albert Museum. In France, his work can be seen in Toulouse at the musée des Augustins and at Saint Exupère's church and in Paris, where he painted some of the vaults of the Hôtel Brûlart. In Italy, his paintings can be found in various churches and in the provincial museum of Lecce, his native city.

=== Gallery of Verrio's work ===
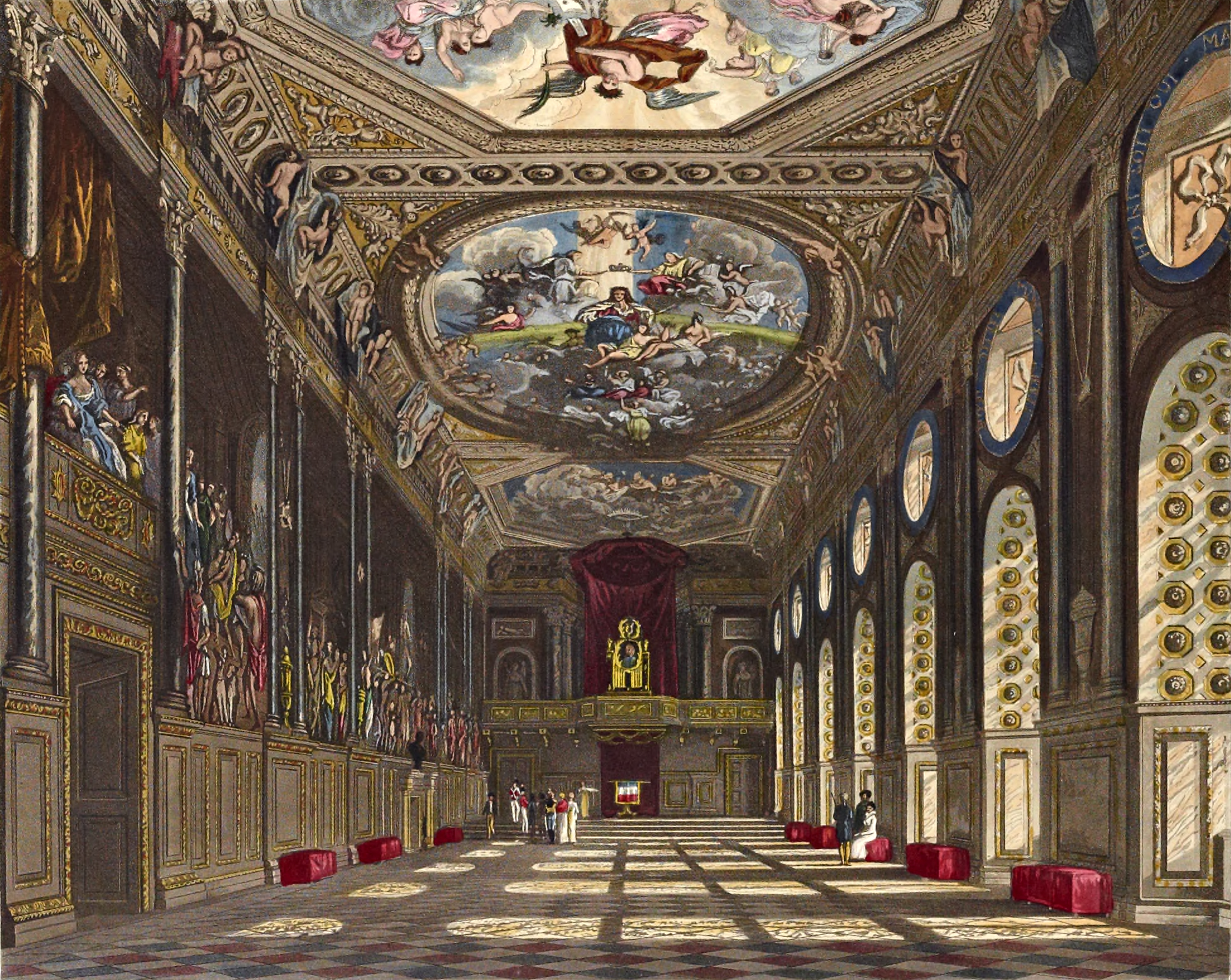
St. George's Hall, Windsor Castle, showing Verrio's murals of the 1680s, destroyed in the early nineteenth century

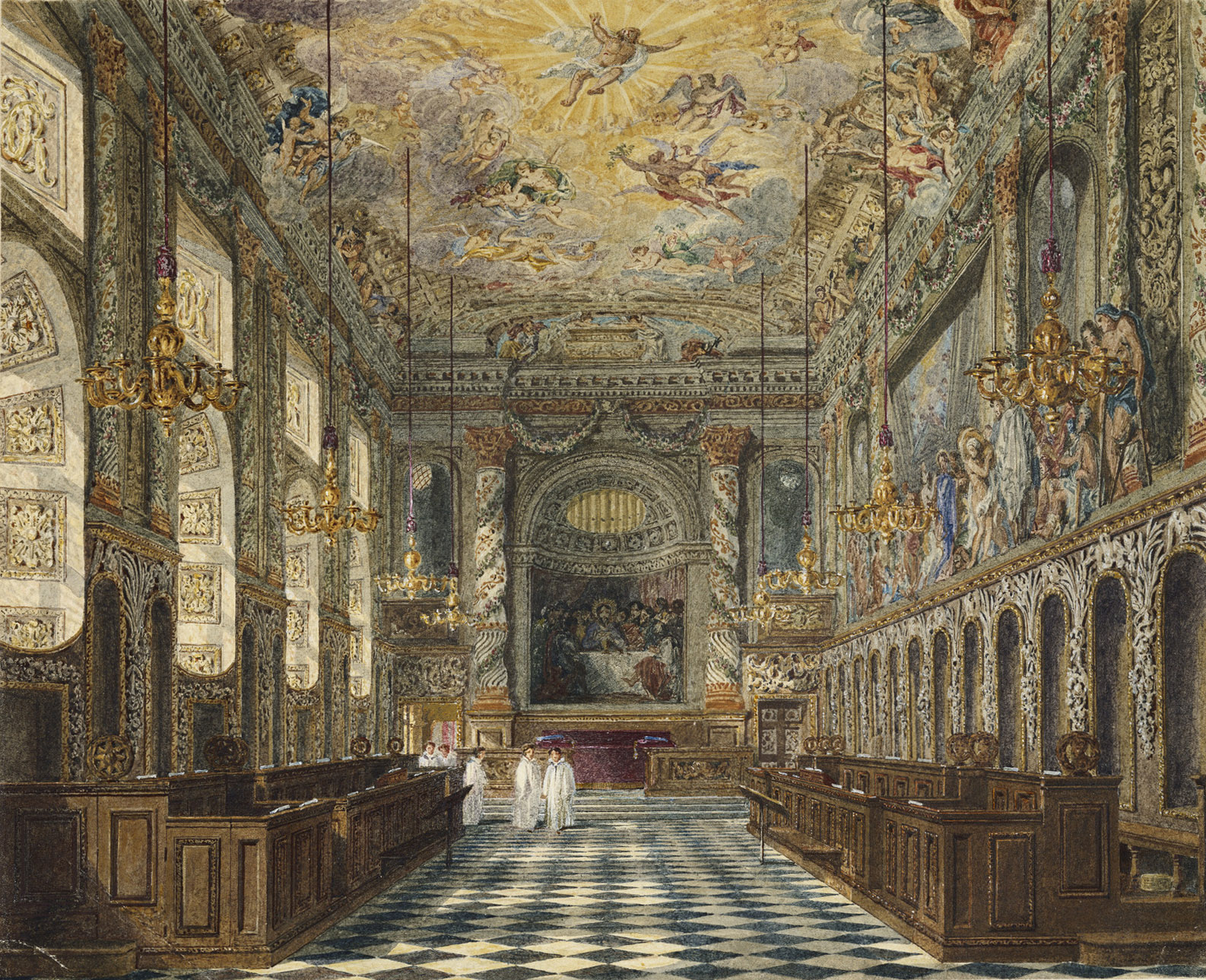
The Chapel Royal, Windsor Castle, showing Verrio's murals of the 1680s, destroyed in the early nineteenth century

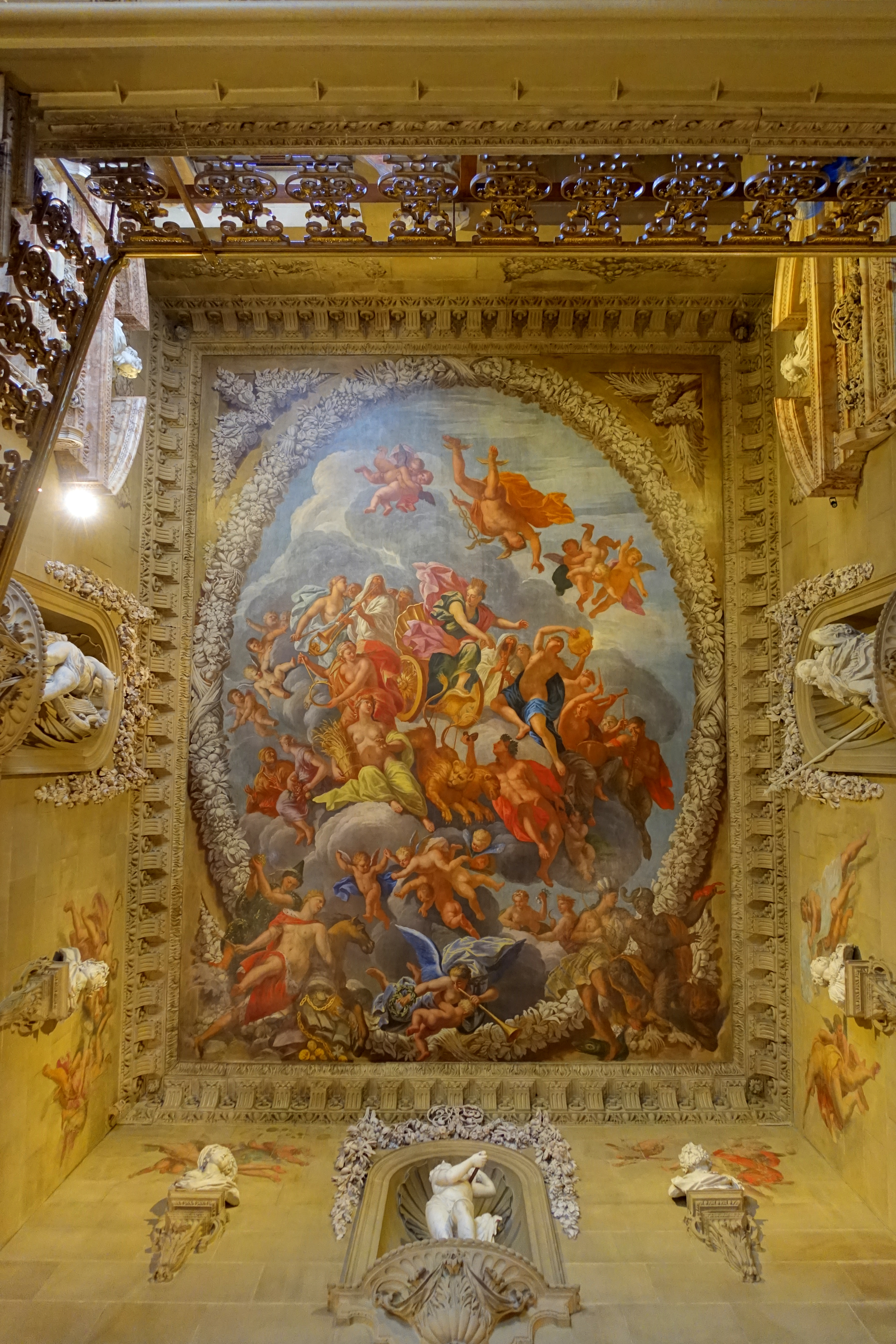
Great Staircase, Chatsworth House, Triumph of Semele, ceiling painted 1691

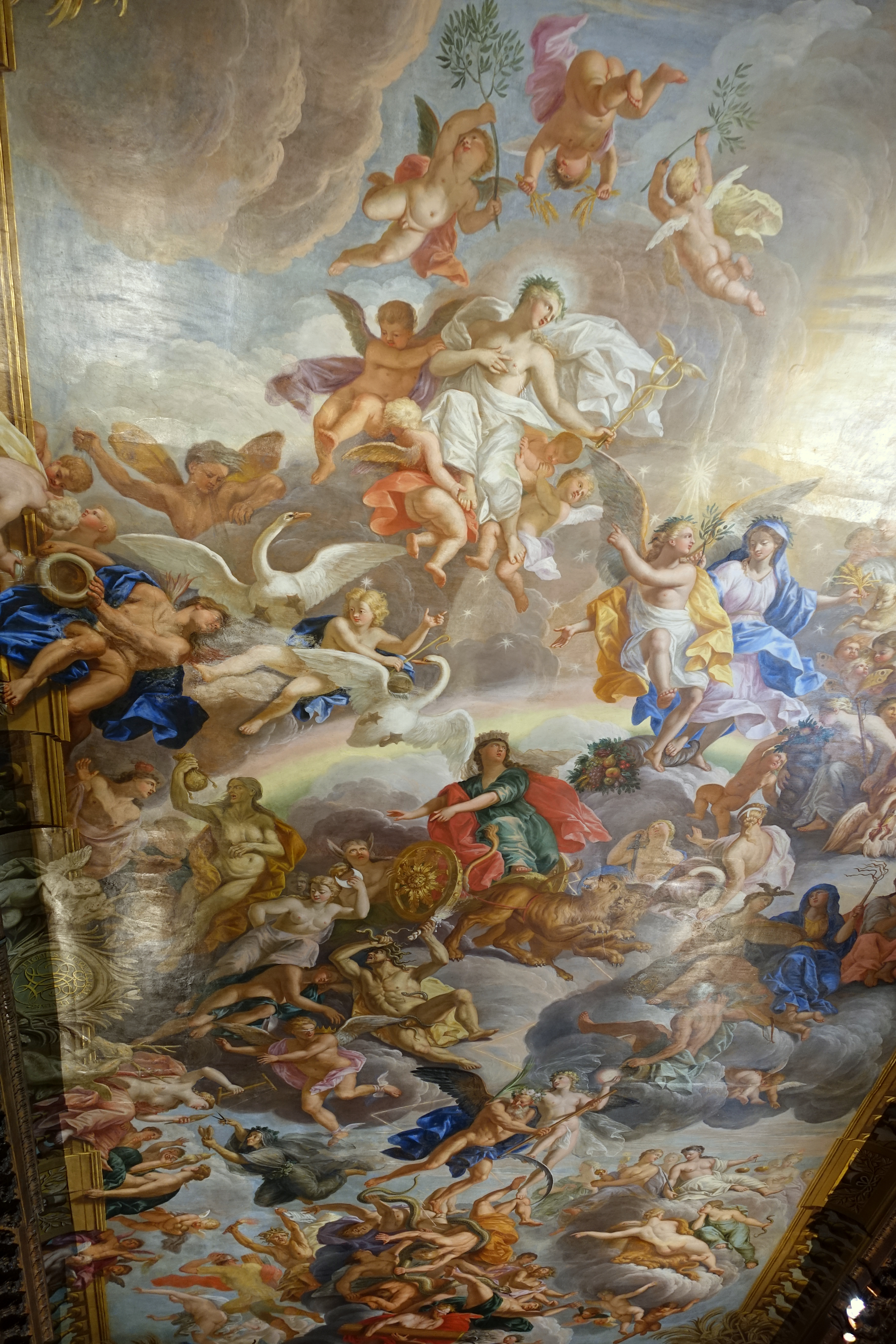
Great Chamber, Chatsworth House, Return of the Golden Age (Assembly of the Gods), 1691–1692

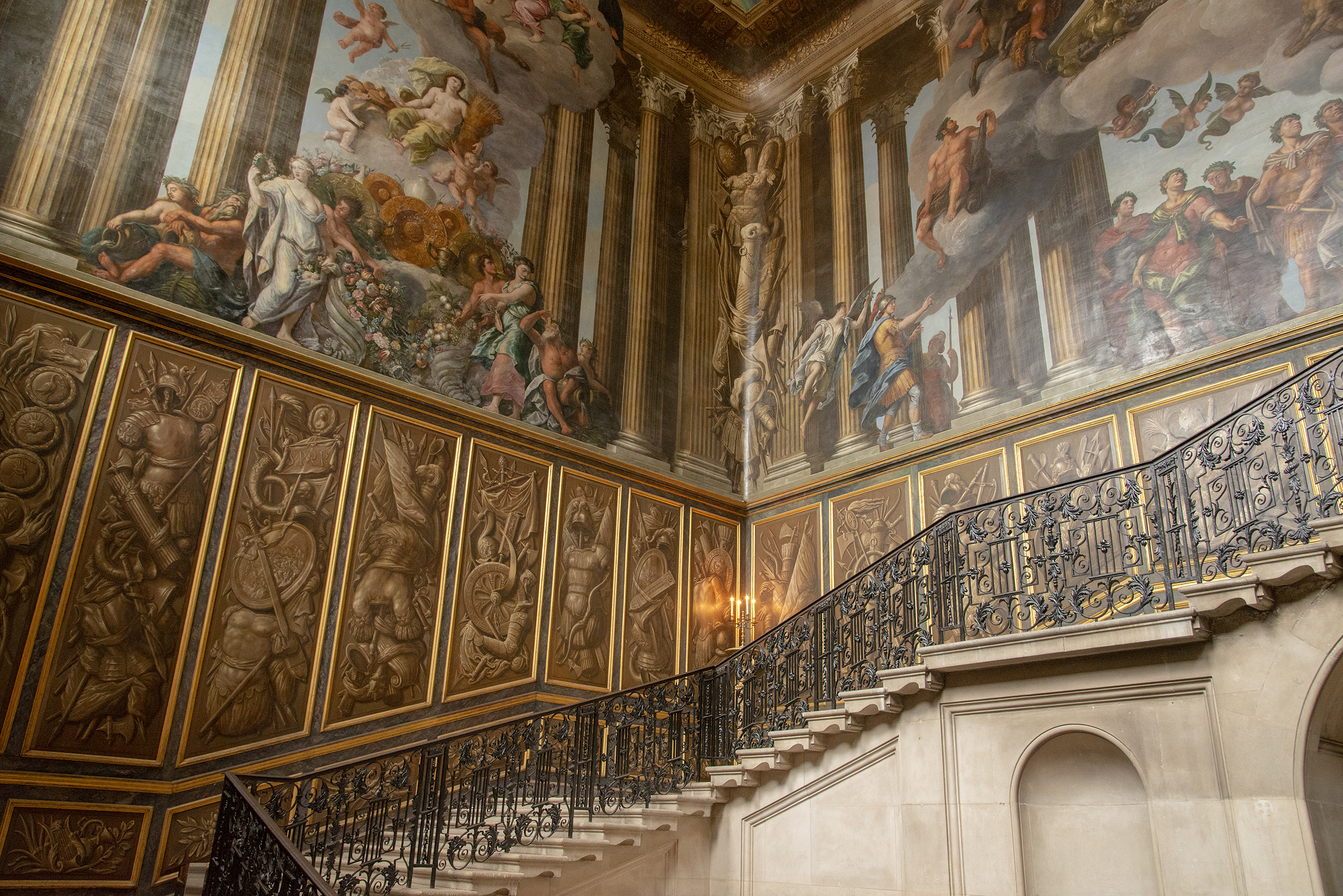
The King's Staircase, Hampton Court Palace, murals 1701–02

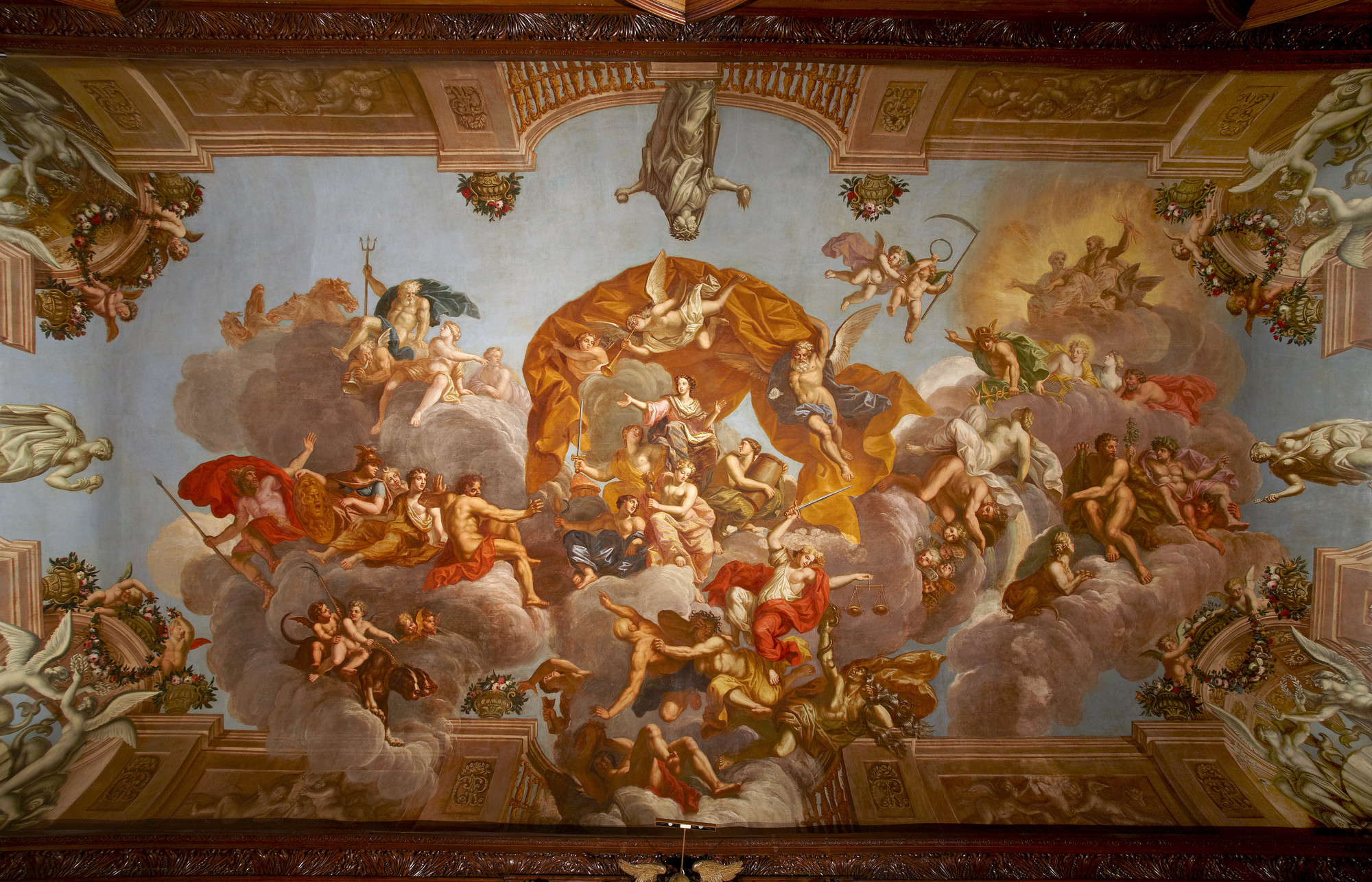
The Apotheosis of Catherine of Braganza, at Windsor Castle
