= Cassiobury House =

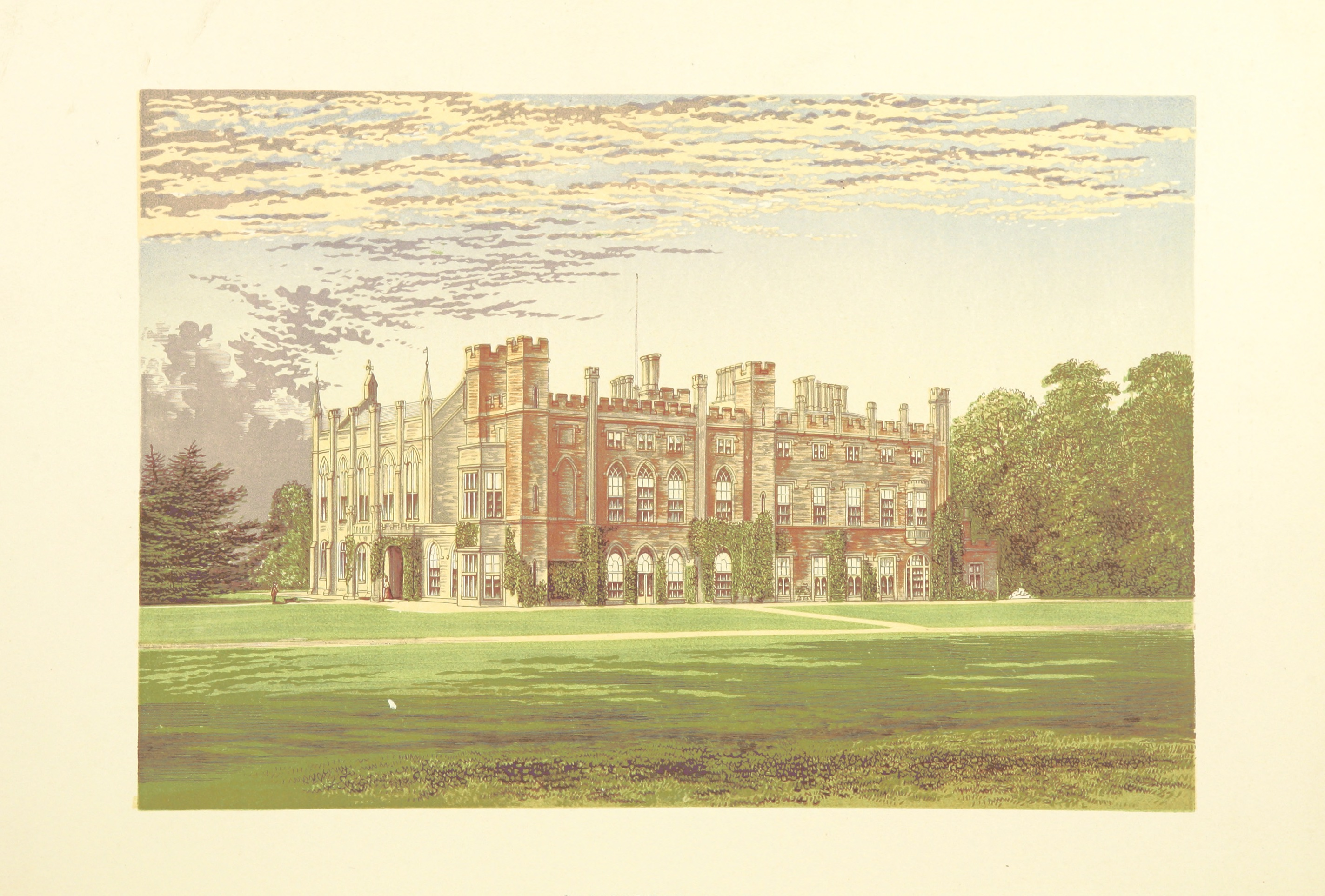
- Cassiobury House (The County Seats of the Noblemen and Gentlemen of Great Britain and Ireland, by Francis Orpen Morris)

- Location within Hertfordshire
- Former names: Manor of Cashio

General information
- Status: Demolished
- Type: English country house
- Architectural style: Neoclassical, later renovated in the Gothic Revival style
- Location: Watford, Hertfordshire, United Kingdom
- Coordinates: 51°39′54″N 00°25′08″W
- Construction started: 1546
- Completed: 1556
- Renovated: c.1677–80; 1805
- Closed: 1922
- Demolished: 1927

Technical details
- Grounds: 693 acres (2.80 km^{2})

Design and construction
- Other designers: Grinling Gibbons, Antonio Verrio, Moses Cook Humphry Repton Jeffry Wyatville

Renovating team
- Architects: Hugh May; James Wyatt

Other information
- Number of rooms: 56

Website
- Cassiobury Park - house history

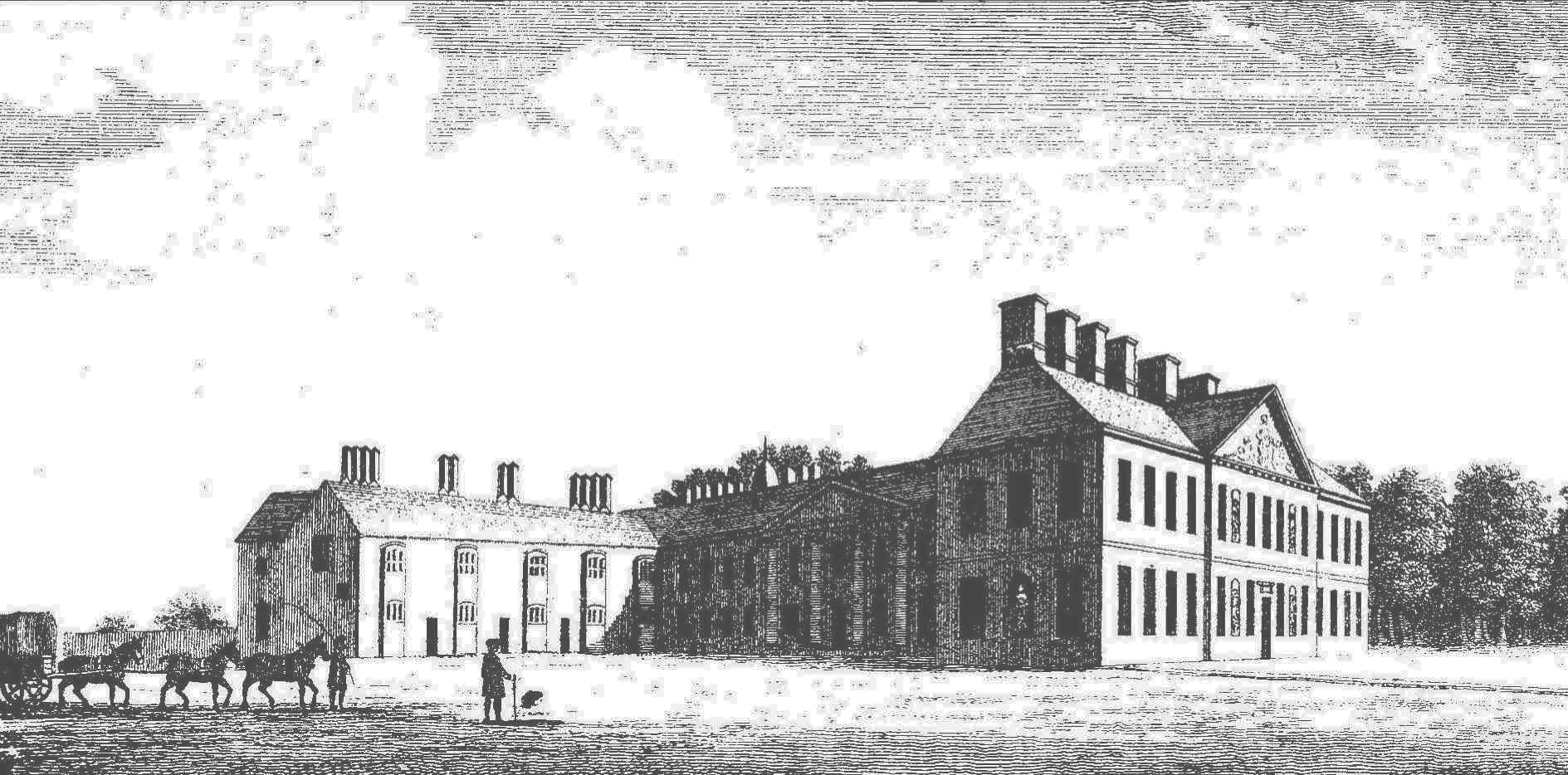
A woodcut of Cassiobury House as it was in 1707.

Cassiobury House was a country house in Cassiobury Park, Watford, England. It was the ancestral seat of the Earls of Essex. Originally a Tudor building, dating from 1546 for Sir Richard Morrison, it was substantially remodelled in the 17th and 19th centuries and ultimately demolished in 1927. The surrounding Cassiobury Park was turned into the main public open space for Watford.

== History ==
=== Beginnings ===
St Albans Abbey claimed rights to the manor of Cashio (then called "Albanestou"), which included Watford, dating from a grant by King Offa of Mercia in AD 793. When King Henry VIII of England dissolved the monasteries in 1539, Watford was divided from Cashio, and the King made himself lord of the manor of Cassiobury. In 1546, he granted the manor to Sir Richard Morrison, who started to build Cassiobury House in the extensive gardens, but had not made much progress by 1553, when he went into exile abroad. The estate grounds were much larger than they are today, reaching as far as North Watford and southwards almost to Moor Park. After the death of his father in 1556, Sir Charles Morrison (1549–1599) continued building and completed the mansion, which had 56 rooms, a long gallery, stables, a dairy, and a brewhouse. Sir Charles was succeeded by his son, Sir Charles Morrison, 1st Baronet (1587–1628); the younger Charles had a daughter, Elizabeth Morrison (1610–1660).

=== 17th century ===
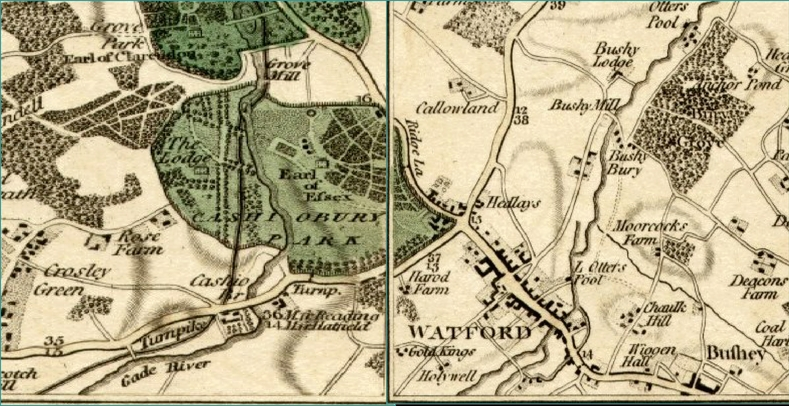
A map by John Cary showing the grounds of the park in 1800

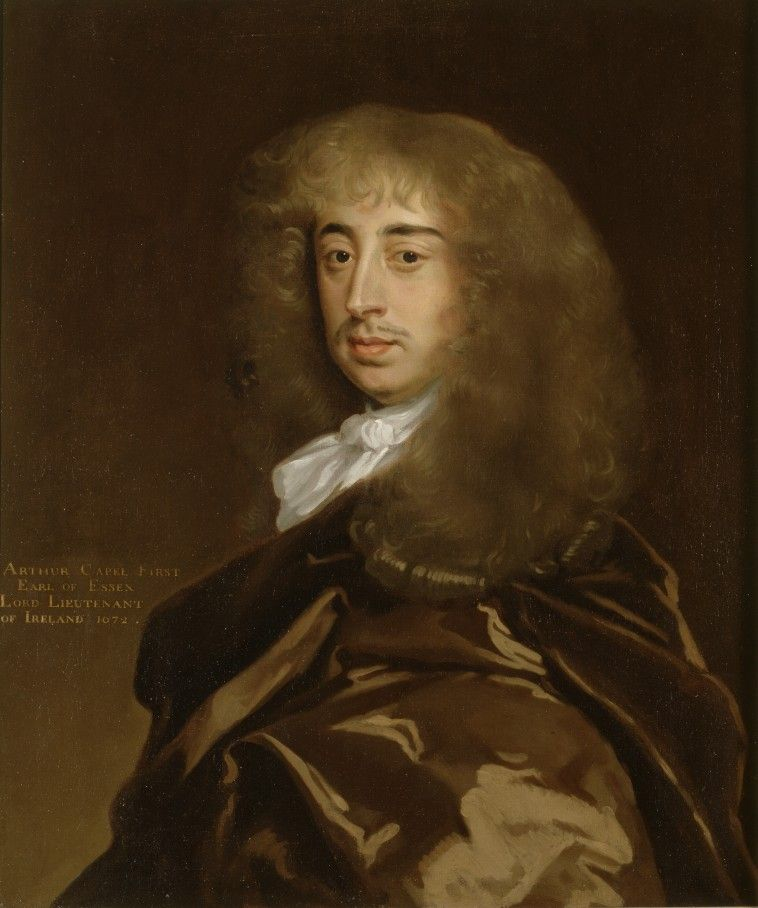
Arthur Capell, rebuilder of Cassiobury 1677–80

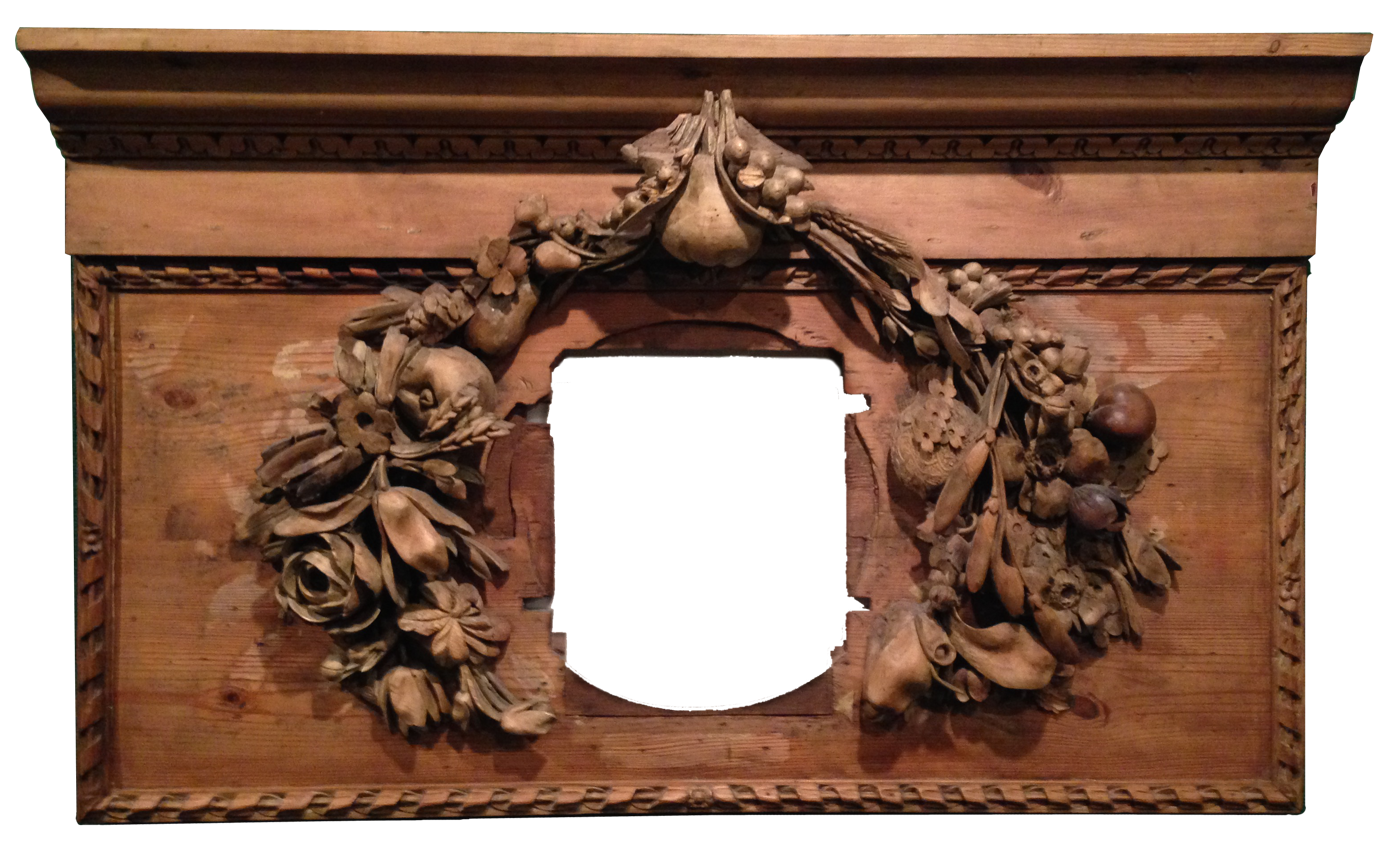
Clock surround, c.1676: an example of Gibbons's interior decoration for Cassiobury

Peers at Cassiobury
Date	Event
1546–1556	Sir Richard Morrison
1556–1599	Sir Charles Morison
1599–1628	Sir Charles Morrison, 1st Baronet
1628–1649	Elizabeth Morrison m. Arthur Capell, 1st Baron Capell of Hadham
1649–1660	The Interregnum
1661–1683	Arthur Capell, 1st Earl of Essex
1683–1710	Algernon Capell, 2nd Earl of Essex
1710–1743	William Capell, 3rd Earl of Essex
1743–1799	William Capell, 4th Earl of Essex
1799–1839	George Capel-Coningsby, 5th Earl of Essex
1839–1892	Arthur Algernon Capell, 6th Earl of Essex
1892–1916	George Capell, 7th Earl of Essex
1927	Cassiobury House demolished

In 1627 Sir Charles Morrison's daughter, Elizabeth (the heir to Cassiobury), married Arthur Capell, 1st Baron Capell of Hadham (1610–1649) and the estate passed into the Capel family. The Capels were settled at Little Hadham in Hertfordshire, but after the marriage they became closely associated with Cassiobury. Arthur Capel was a politician and a supporter of the Royalist cause in the English Civil War; during Cromwell's rise to power, Capel was tried and condemned to death by the Parliamentarians, and beheaded in May 1649. Cassiobury had been sequestrated by Parliament. Arthur Capell's widow Lady Elizabeth Capell successfully petitioned Parliament for Cassiobury (and the other lands she had inherited from her father Charles Morrison) to be returned to her on (7–8 May 1649).

After Capell's execution, his son Arthur Capell, 1st Earl of Essex, inherited his estates. Following the Restoration of the Monarchy, the younger Arthur Capell rose to become Lord Lieutenant of Ireland in the reign of Charles II. He moved the Capell family seat from Hadham to Cassiobury, commissioning a lavish reconstruction of his father's Tudor mansion from the architect Hugh May. The new house was built c.1677–80 and laid out on an "H" ground-plan, popular during that period, incorporating the original north-west wing. As he had already done at Windsor Castle, May teamed up with the wood carver of the day, Grinling Gibbons, and the painter Antonio Verrio to create a sumptuous interior. Capell was an ambitious courtier, and by fitting out his mansion with richly decorated state rooms in the style of Windsor, he hoped to attract a visit from the King to Cassiobury — he was not successful.

The diarist John Evelyn visited Cassiobury on 16 April 1680 "On the earnest invitation of the Earl of Essex," and dedicated an insightful passage to the merits and disadvantages of the house and grounds, describing some of the interior fittings and decorations.

The house, is new, a plain fabric, built by my friend, Mr. Hugh May. There are divers fair and good rooms, and excellent carving by Gibbons, especially the chimney-piece of the library. There is in the porch, or entrance, a painting by Verrio, of Apollo and the Liberal Arts. One room pargetted with yew I liked well. Some of the chimney mantels are of Irish marble, brought by my Lord from Ireland, when he was Lord Lieutenant, and not much inferior to Italian. The tympanum, or gable, at the front is a bass-relievo of Diana hunting, cut in Portland stone, handsomely enough ... The library is large and very nobly furnished.

— John Evelyn, Diary and Correspondence

Among the internal decorations was the ornately carved main staircase, a work attributed to Gibbons (although more recently attributed to Edward Pearce) which featured flower and fruit formations, oak leaves and acorns, acanthus flowers and foliation, bursting seed pods and pine-cones on the bannister finials. The staircase was built of oak wood, with the balustrade and decorations and executed in pine and ash.

The park and gardens were laid out by Moses Cook who devised woodland walks and avenues, and provided "an excellent collection of the choicest fruits". Later, the gardeners George London and Charles Bridgeman also worked at Cassiobury. Between 1672 and 1720 an avenue of 296 lime trees was planted, linking the gardens to Whippendell Wood. Remnants of this can still be seen today.

The building of Little Cassiobury (the dower house) also dates from this period and still exists in Hempstead Road, Watford.

=== Late 18th and 19th centuries ===
The Grand Union Canal dates from the late eighteenth century. The 4th Earl was one of the noblemen on the board of the canal company; at his insistence the canal was widened and landscaped where it passed through his property.

The 5th Earl of Essex arrived at Cassiobury in 1799 and commissioned James Wyatt to add a Gothic exterior and an orangery. Most of the rebuilding was finished by 1805. The new house comprised a large number of rooms, the main ones being the Winter Drawing Room, with family portraits by Peter Lely and Van Dyck; the Crimson Drawing Room, with Canaletto, Gainsborough, Morland, and Reynolds; the Inner Library, which also had portraits by Reynolds; and the Great Library, in which were busts of the Duke of Bedford, the Duke of Wellington, Napoleon and Charles I. The furniture of the Best Drawing Room was said to be "of the latest fashion and displays superior taste". Another spectacular room was the State Bedroom, with blue and white furnishings, a Gobelin tapestry (The Village Feast), and a ceiling in blue and gilt. In 1816, the socialite Frances Calvert visited and commented that Cassiobury was "a very pretty house, and more full of comforts, curiosities and pretty things than any house I ever saw", and that the flower gardens were the "most complete in England".

Humphry Repton was commissioned to landscape the park. A number of lodges and other buildings for the estate were constructed. These were designed by Wyatt's nephew, Jeffry Wyatville (1766–1840). Only one now survives: Cassiobury Lodge, in Gade Avenue, "... the most elaborate in execution — its whole exterior being covered or cased with sticks of various sizes split in two", wrote a Victorian visitor. At this time the park comprised 693 acres (2.80 km^{2}), the Home Park and the Upper Park being separated by the River Gade. The Upper Park became the West Herts Golf Course.

From 1846 to 1848, Cassiobury House temporarily became a royal residence when the Dowager Queen Adelaide, widow of King William IV, took up residence here. Suffering from chronic illness, Adelaide often moved her place of residence in a vain search for health, staying at the country houses of various British aristocracy. After living for a short time at Witley Court in Worcestershire, she came to Watford and rented Cassiobury. During her time here, she played host to Queen Victoria and Prince Albert. Within three years, Adelaide had moved on again, taking up residence at Bentley Priory in Stanmore.

In 1841 a fire destroyed the orangery, which was filled with newly collected plants and fine orange trees, some of which had been presented to the 6th Earl by Louis XVIII. Herds of deer roamed the park. Parties were a regular feature at the weekends. The public were allowed to ride and walk through the grounds, but had to apply for a ticket in advance.

=== 20th century ===
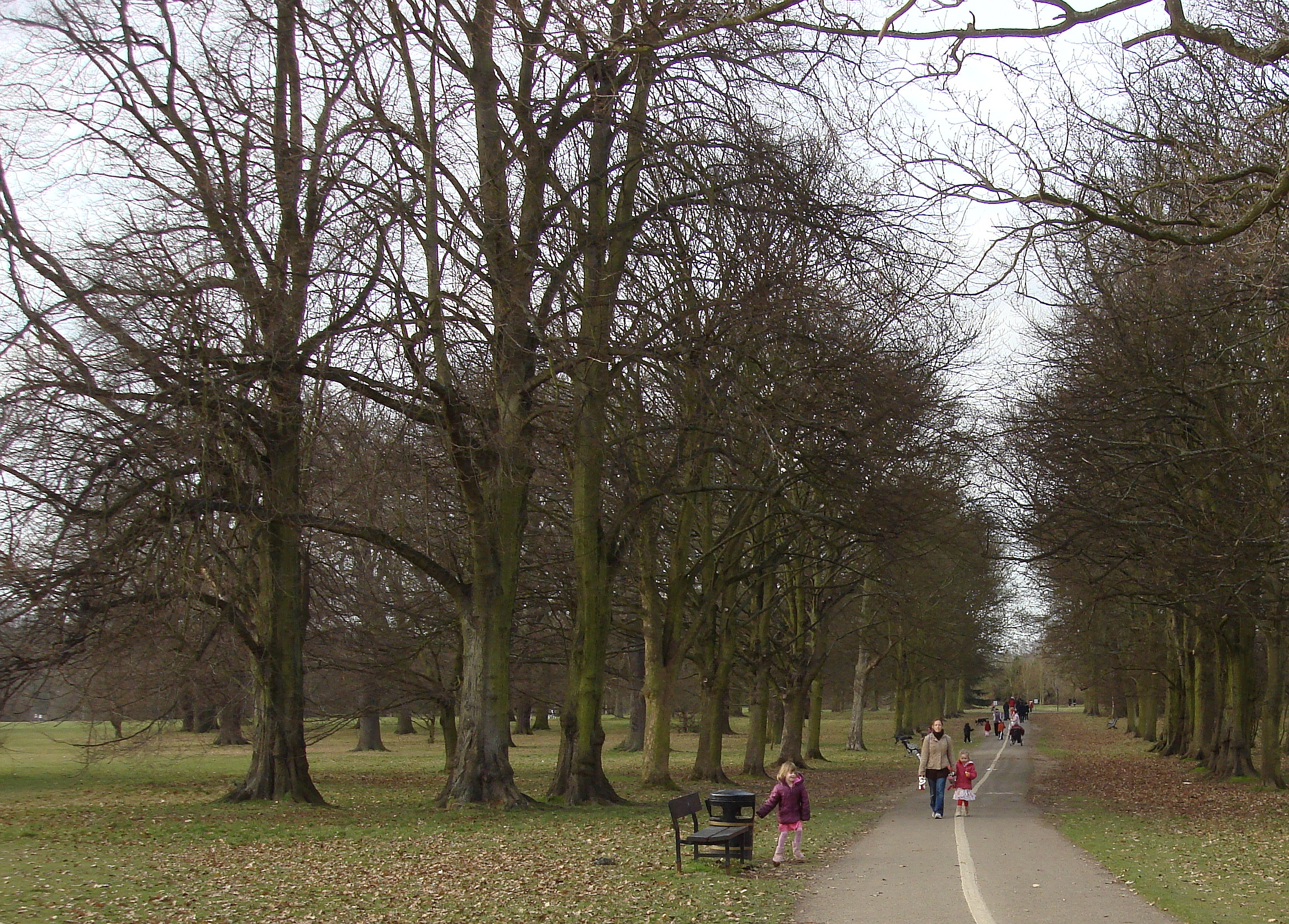
The public park today

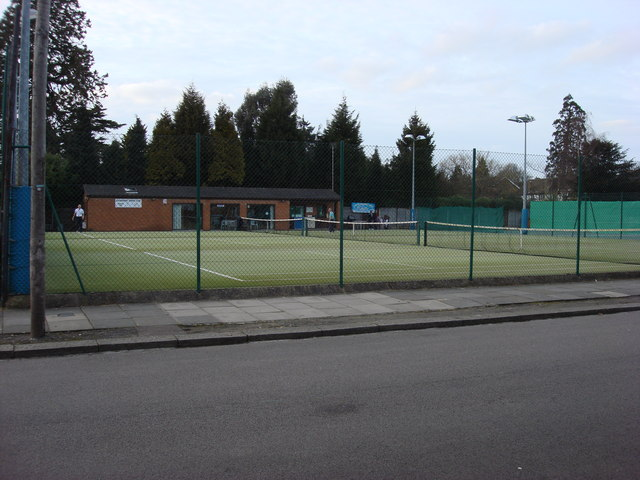
A 2009 view of the former site of Cassiobury House, just behind the Cassiobury Tennis Club

In 1893 the 7th Earl of Essex, George Capell, married an American heiress, Adele Grant, the daughter of the New York steam locomotive magnate, David Beach Grant. The Earl's wealth was, by the standards of the day, not especially great, and it was Adele's money that supported the estate in the early years of the 20th century. The parties and entertainments at Cassiobury House continued into the new century: in 1902 it was visited by the young Winston Churchill and King Edward VII. However, about this time the Essex family planned to let the house and live in London as the upkeep was becoming increasingly expensive. In 1909, 184 acres (0.74 km^{2}) of parkland were sold, most to Watford Borough Council for housing and the public park.

George Capell died in 1916 aged 59, after being knocked down by a taxi. The death of the 7th Earl of Essex set in motion events that were to bring about the demise of Cassiobury House and change the town of Watford. Death duties, a form of taxation introduced in 1894 by the Liberal Government, was placing an increasing financial burden on landed gentry at this time and was responsible for the breaking up of many large estates across Britain. The considerable death duties resulting from the 7th Earl's death affected the family fortunes, and after six years, his widow and their son, the 8th Earl, decided to put Cassiobury House and its assets on the market. On Thursday 8 June 1922, at 2.30 p.m. at 20 Hanover Square, "By direction of the Right Honourable Adèle, Countess Dowager of Essex", "Cassiobury Park estate including the historical family mansion, Little Cassiobury, and the West Herts Golf Links, embracing in all an Area of about 870 acres (3.5 km^{2})" was auctioned by Humbert & Flint, in conjunction with Knight, Frank & Rutley.

A large sale of the contents was held over a period of ten days in June 1922. The lavish interior fixtures and fittings, furniture and fine art collection were split up and sold to private collectors and museums around the world, mainly in the United States (see below). Adele did not, however, find a buyer for Cassiobury House; in July 1922 she died of a heart attack in her bath, and the house remained unoccupied for a further five years. Finally, in 1927 it was demolished and sold for its materials. Posters advertised "To lovers of the antique, architects, builders, etc., 300 tons of old oak: 100 very fine old oak beams and 10,000 Tudor period bricks". Much of the building material salvaged from the house, along with some interior fittings, were used to build a new house of the same name in Bedford, New York.

The expansion of London's railways played a significant part in the demise of Cassiobury House. The incursion of the Metropolitan Railway into Hertfordshire reached Watford in 1926 with the opening of Watford tube station and the Metro-land building programme was at its peak. Developers such as William King & Co and Charles Brightman acquired valuable land around Cassiobury to lay out new streets and build new houses in the vicinity of the new station. The former site of Cassiobury House was eventually built over by a suburban housing development. In 1930, more land for the public park was purchased by Watford Borough Council. A set of grand castellated Tudor-style gates survived at the Rickmansworth Road entrance to the park for several decades, but were finally demolished in 1970 by Watford Borough Council to allow road widening along the A412 road.

== Sale of estate assets ==
As with many British country houses, when the Cassiobury estate was sold off in 1923, museums in America and elsewhere bought the fixtures and much of the art collection. As a result of the disposal of the Earl's assets, valuable remnants of Cassiobury House can now be seen in various museum collections around the world.

The Metropolitan Museum of Art in New York acquired a number of notable Cassiobury pieces, including the ornately carved wooden staircase by Grinling Gibbons/Edward Pearce, as well as three paintings from the house: a double portrait by Sir Joshua Reynolds of George Capel, Viscount Malden (the Fifth Earl of Essex) as a boy of ten with his sister, Lady Elizabeth Capel; a double portrait of Mary and Elizabeth Capel painted by the Dutch artist Sir Peter Lely; and a portrait of their brother Sir Henry Capel, also by Lely.

Other interior wood carvings by Gibbons were salvaged from the house and sold to wealthy buyers around the world to adorn private residences. Some carvings were acquired by the art collector Julius Wernher for the private dining room of the mansion house at Luton Hoo (the Wernher art collection is now at Ranger's House in Greenwich, London). An overmantel enframement was sold to the Crane family and was fitted into the Castle Hill mansion in Ipswich, Massachusetts. A fireplace and panelling were acquired by Frederick Charles and Muriel Blomfield (a cousin of Lord Essex) for their drawing room at nearby Waterdale House. A large selection of Gibbons panels and overmantels, including the entire panelling from Lord Essex's 1680 state bedroom at Cassiobury, were purchased by the American newspaper publisher William Randolph Hearst to install at his Hearst Castle property; he used them at his Ocean House mansion, now the Annenberg Community Beach House, in Santa Monica, California. When Ocean House was demolished, the bedroom panelling and cabinets were purchased by the Edward-Dean Museum & Gardens in Cherry Valley, California where they now form the museum's Pine Room.

The Gilded Age American architect Horace Trumbauer also acquired a Gibbons carving for his own house in Wynnefield, Philadelphia, Pennsylvania. The Cassiobury House in Bedford, New York, which was constructed from bricks salvaged from the demolished Watford mansion, may also have been fitted with interior panelling from Lord Essex's rooms. The American property featured in a short television report on NBC New York in 2011, which shows extensive wood panelling, some carved chimney pieces and 18th-century Chinese silk wallpaper. Other materials from Cassiobury were used to restore Monmouth House in Watford High Street.

The mechanism of the clock which was designed in 1610 by Leonard Tenant was removed from the turret of Cassiobury House and is now on public display in the British Museum as an example of a seventeenth century tower clock. A set of 12 late medieval stained-glass roundels depicting the Labours of the Months which had been installed in Cassiobury House during the 19th century was purchased by the Victoria and Albert Museum. The V&A also possesses a carved limewood overdoor/picture surround and cornice portion by Grinling Gibbons. The Watford Museum has acquired a number of paintings from the collection of the Earl of Essex, including a view of Cassiobury House by J. M. W. Turner, a landscape painting of the estate by John Wootton and an interior painting of the Winter Dining Room by William Henry Hunt, along with several portraits of Earls of Essex and their family members painted by Sir Peter Lely, the school of William Wissing, Enoch Seeman, Sir Godfrey Kneller, Andrea Soldi, Sir Joshua Reynolds and Sir Thomas Lawrence, among others. The Capel family by Cornelius Johnson, formerly at Cassiobury is now on display at the National Portrait Gallery in London.

A bureau plat by the Dutch-French maker Bernard II van Risamburgh which once stood in Cassiobury's Inner Library was acquired by the Elisabeth Severance Prentiss Collection of the Cleveland Museum of Art; the museum also holds decorated fittings from the house by Grinling Gibbons.

Treasures & Artworks of Cassiobury House
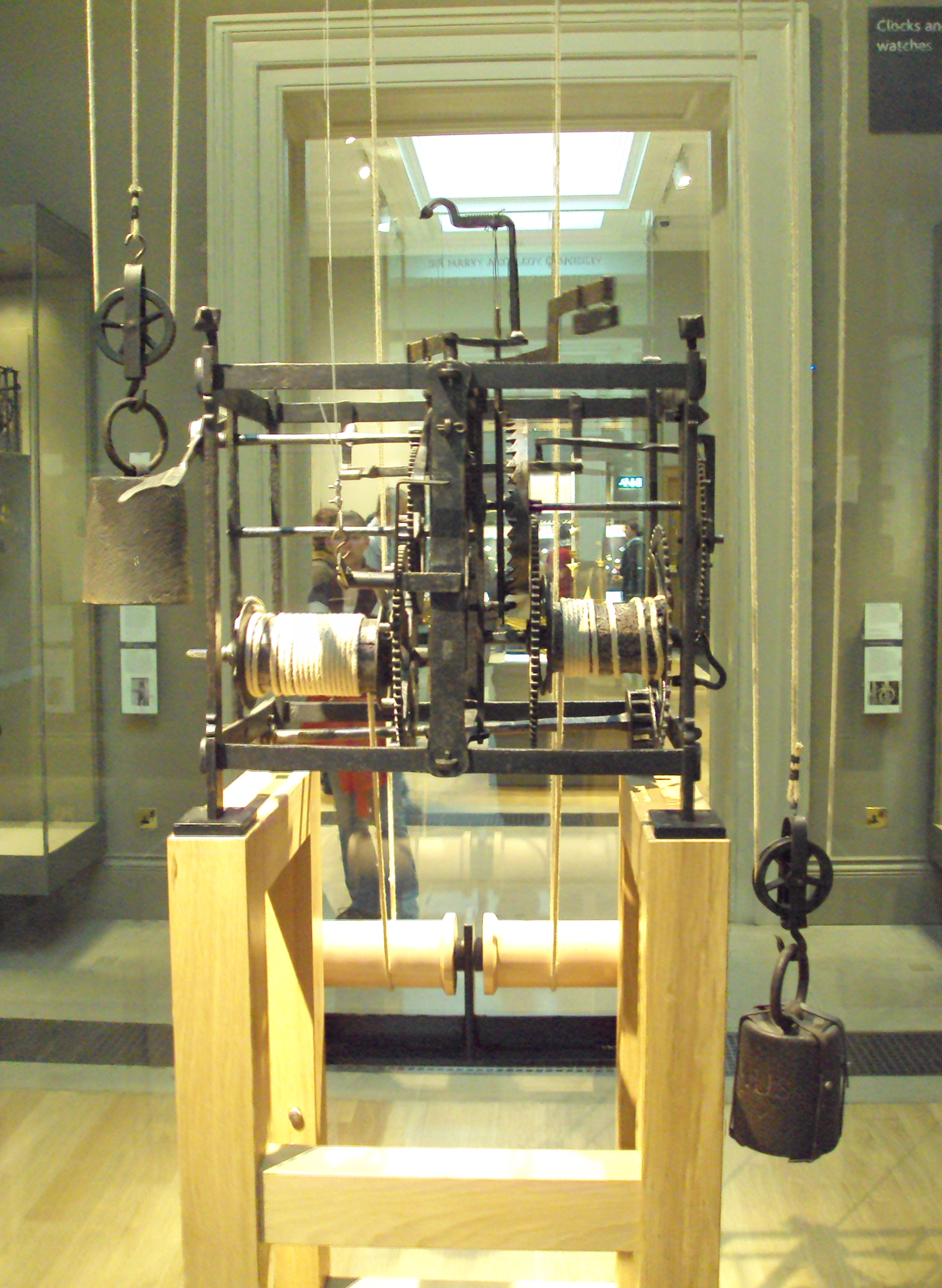
The Cassiobury turret clock (British Museum)

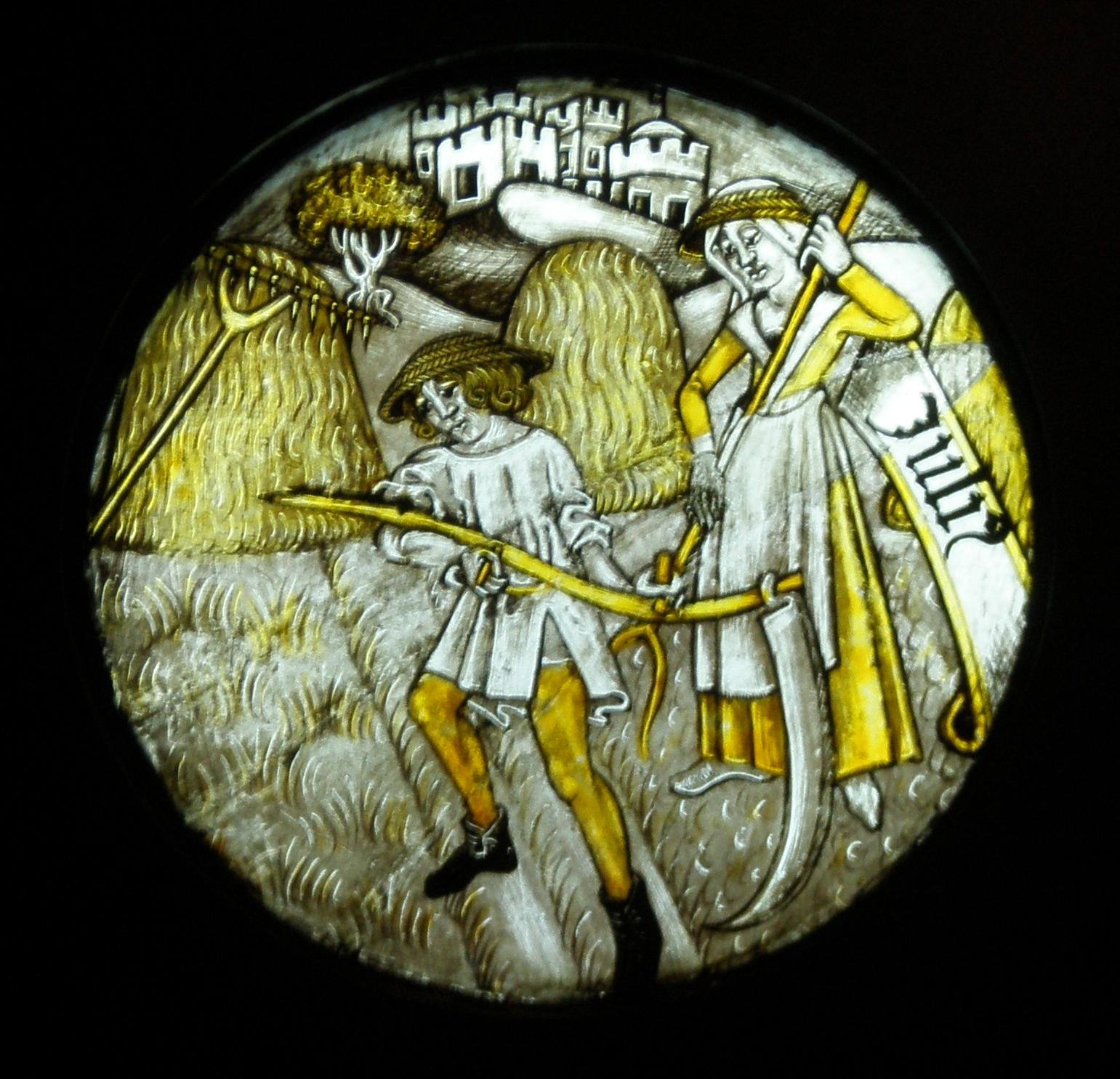
One of the Cassiobury stained-glass panels (V&A)

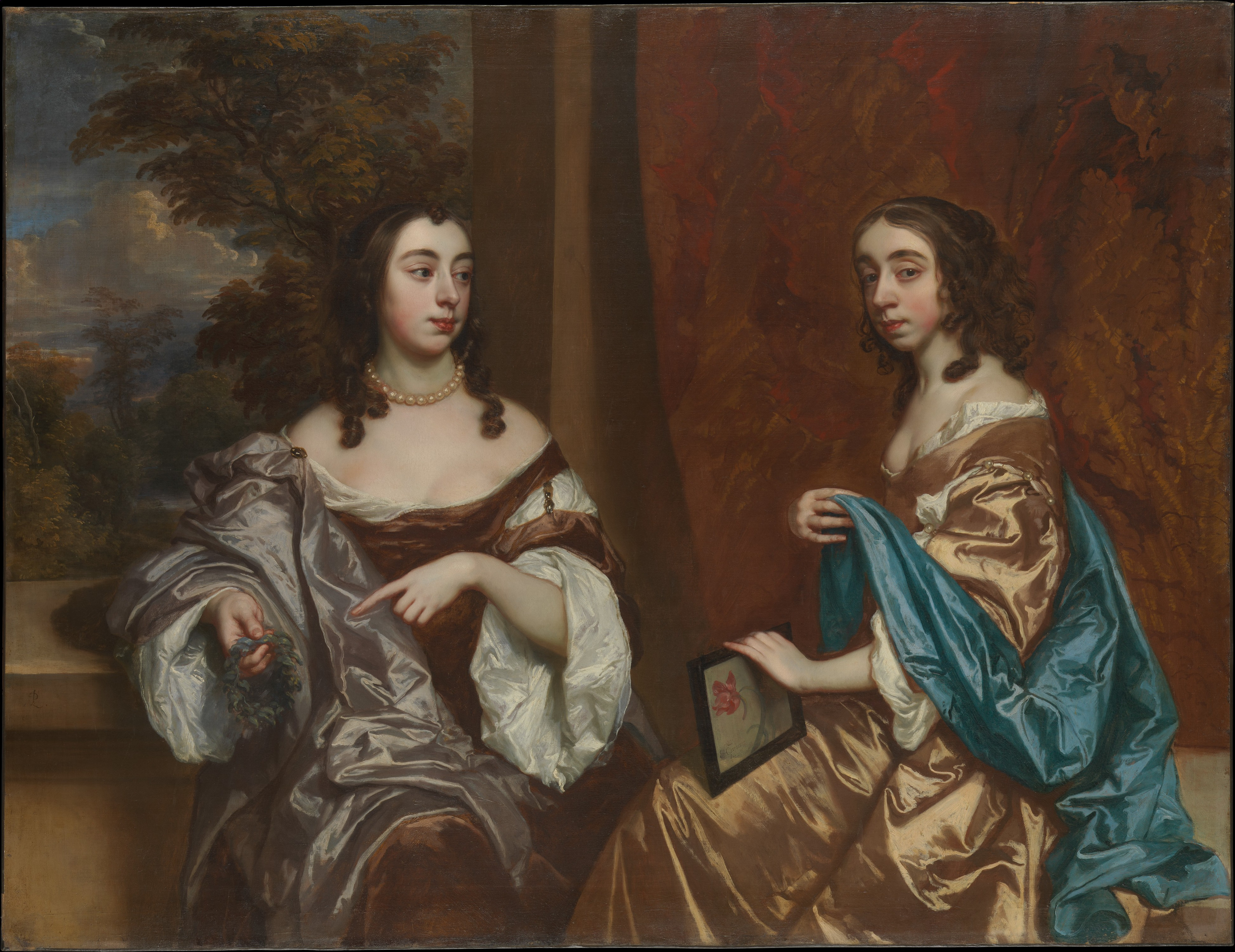
1670s portrait by Sir Peter Lely of Mary & Elizabeth Capel (Metropolitan Museum of Art)

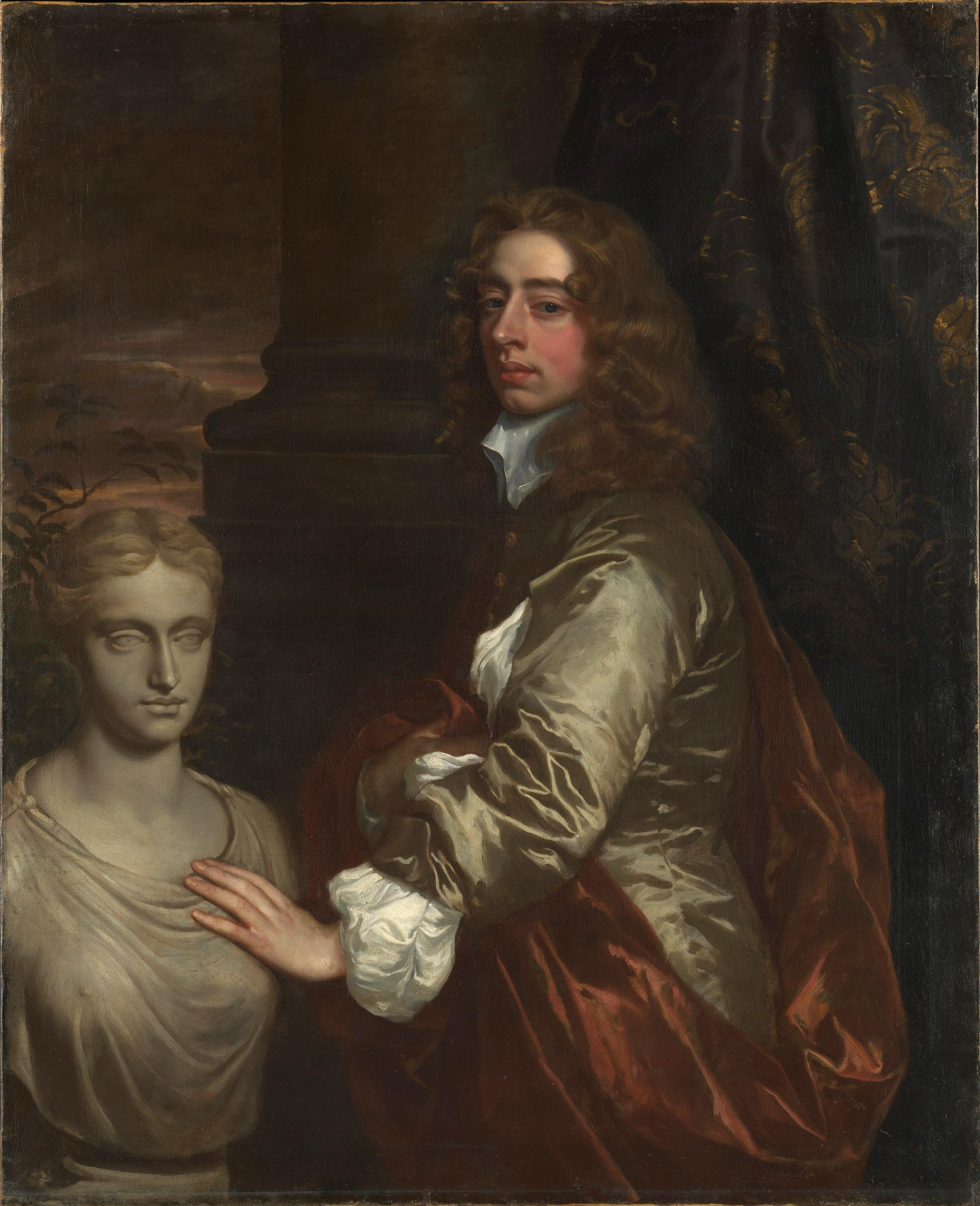
1659 portrait by Sir Peter Lely of Henry Capel (Metropolitan Museum of Art)

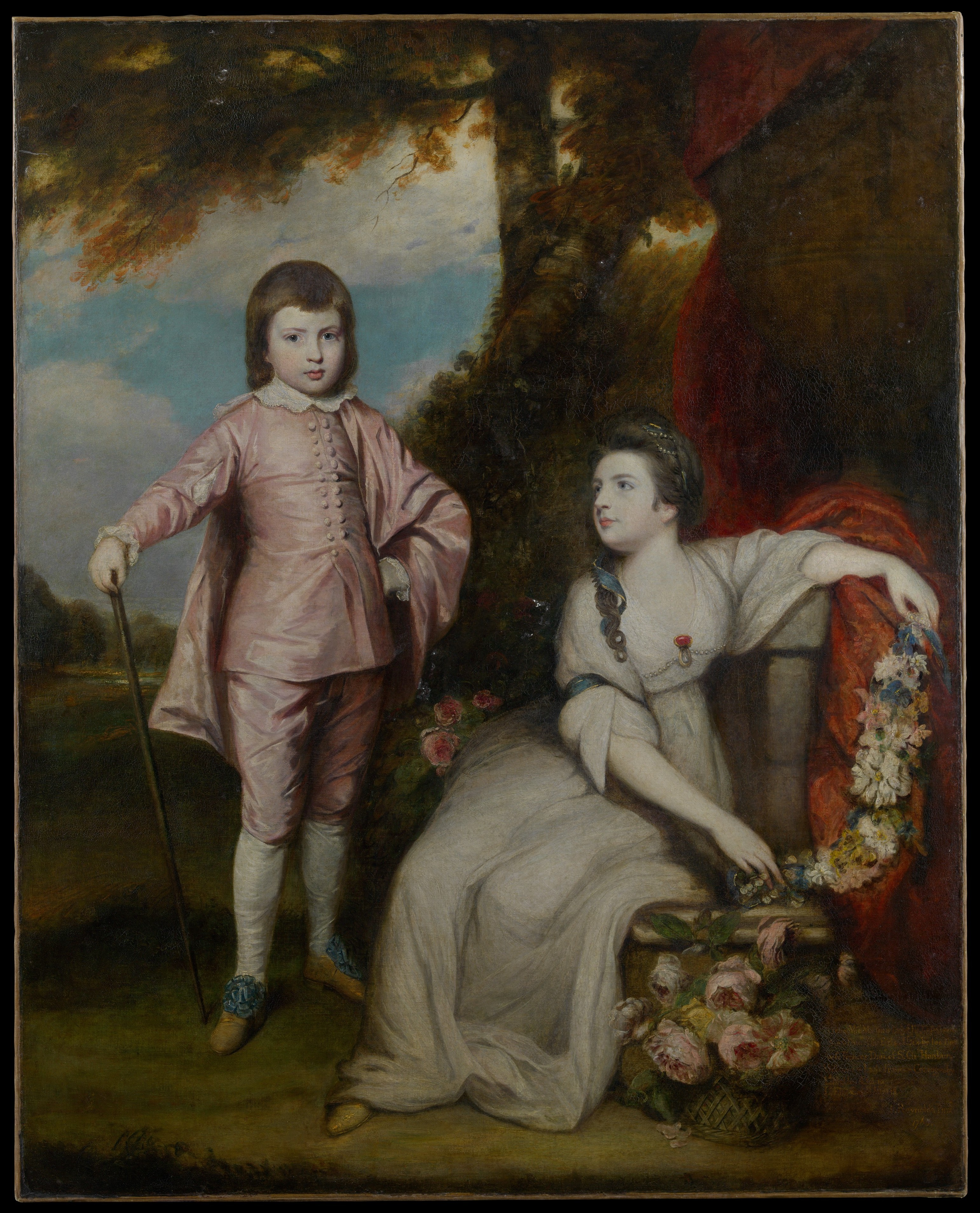
1768 portrait by Sir Joshua Reynolds portrait of George and Elizabeth Capel (Metropolitan Museum of Art)

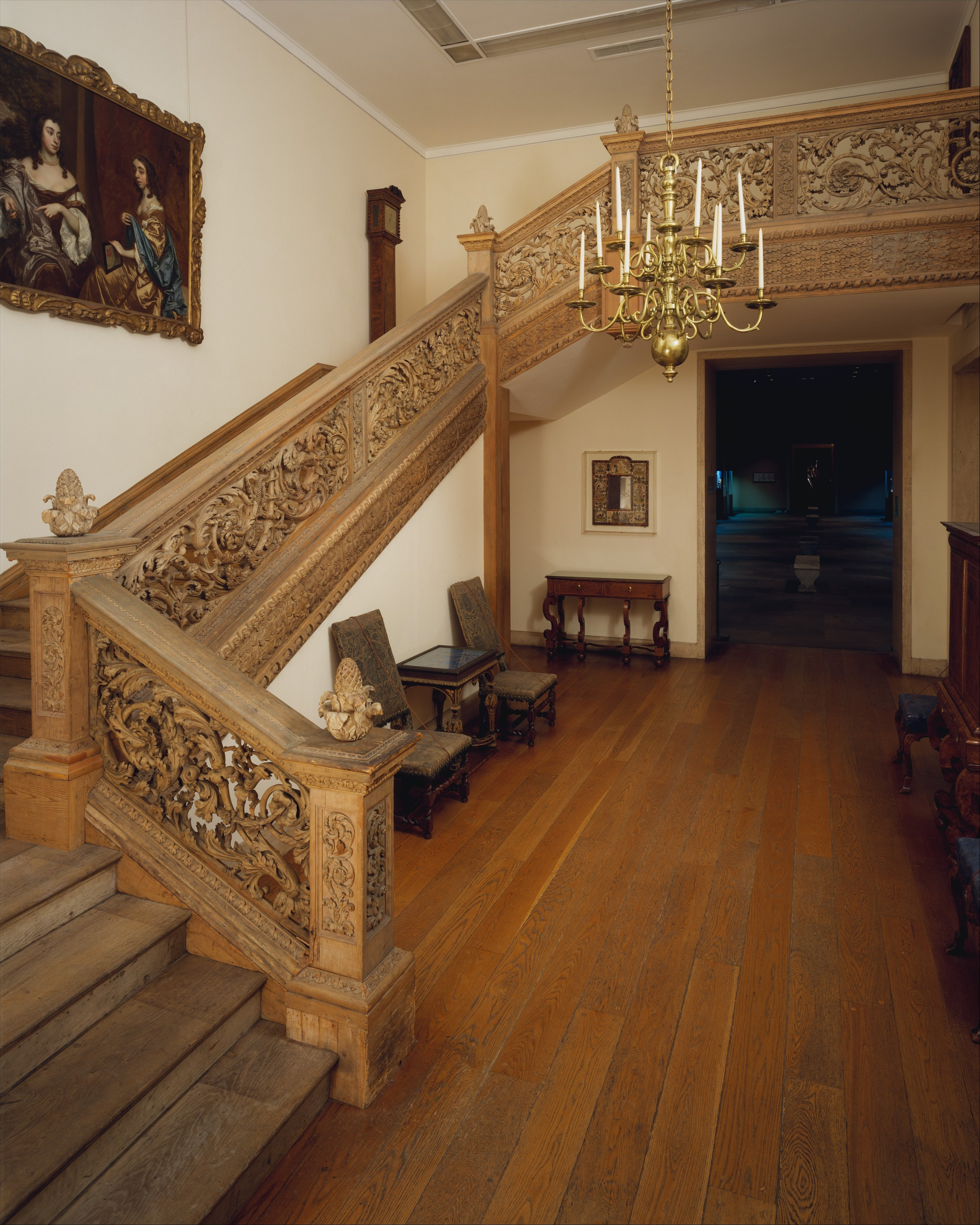
The Cassiobury grand staircase (Metropolitan Museum of Art, New york)

== Cassiobury today ==
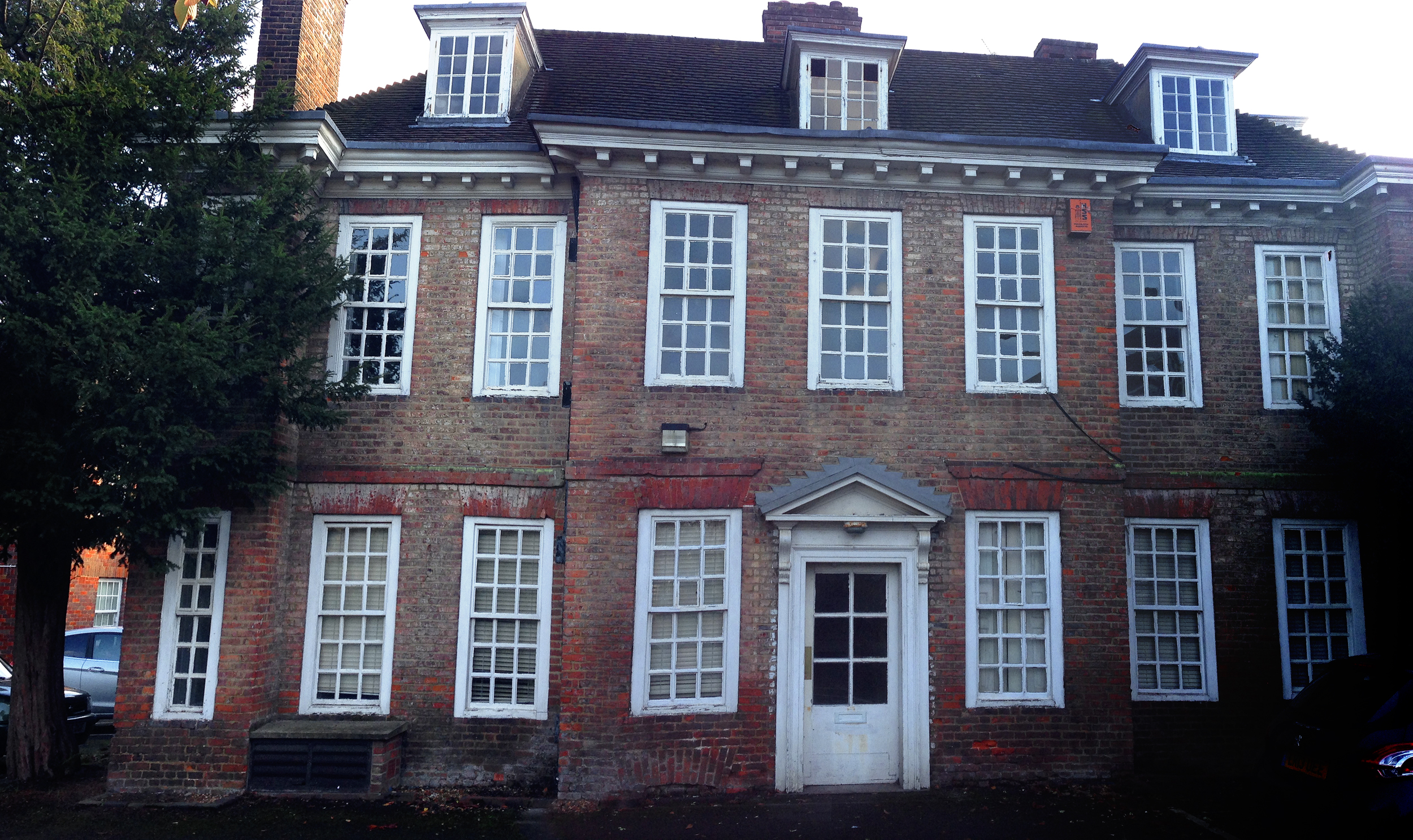
The former Dower House, Little Cassiobury

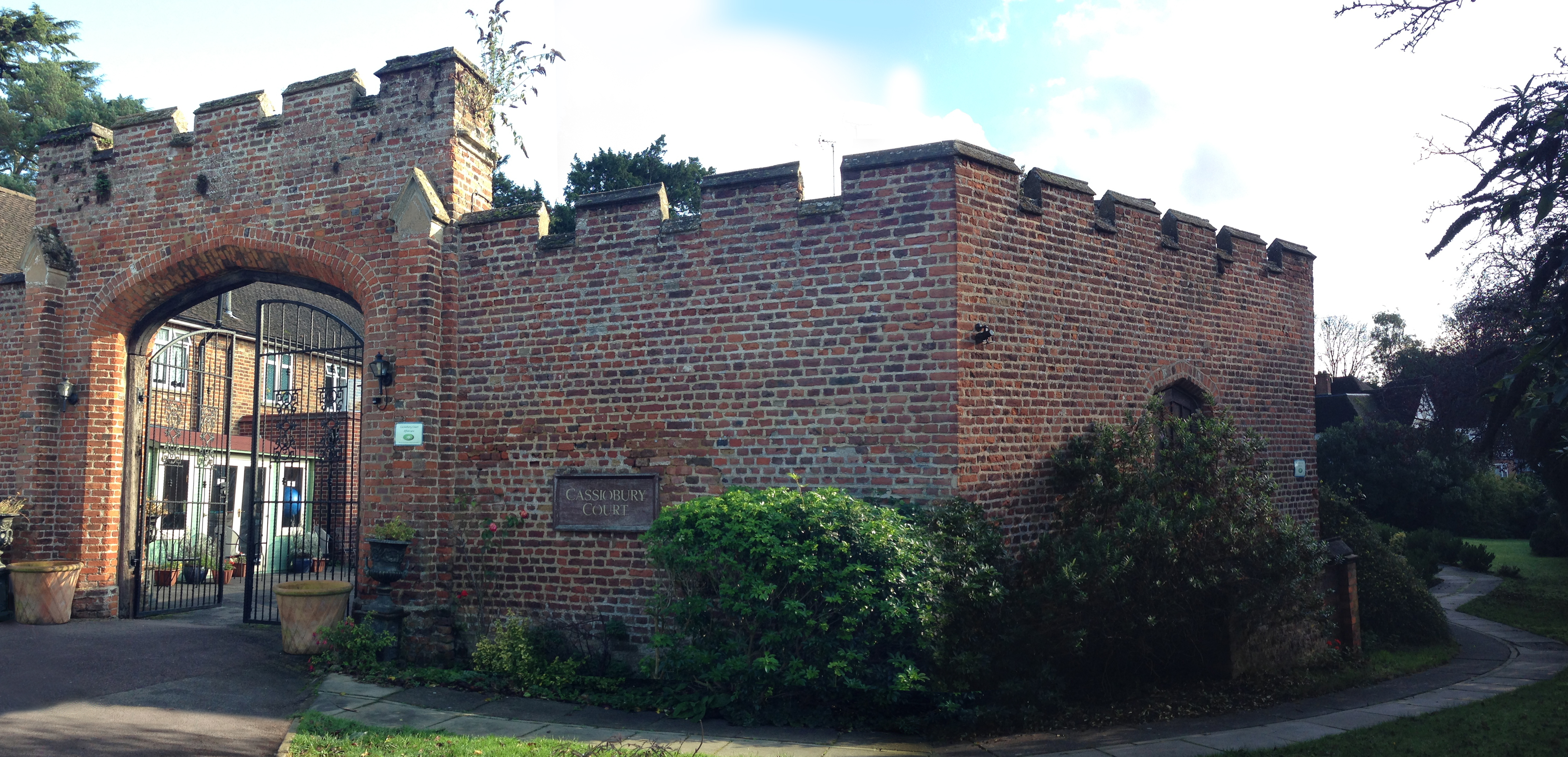
Cassiobury Court, the former stables

When the Cassiobury Estate was put up for sale, Watford Borough Council purchased the park land to use for public amenities, and today a large area of the Cassiobury grounds now form the public Cassiobury Park. The site of the house lay in the area of land which was sold for housing development and is now occupied by the residential properties which lie between Temple Close and Parkside Drive.

Although Cassiobury House was demolished in 1927, some minor associated buildings have survived to the present day. The Cassiobury House stables (built c.1805–15) survived and were converted into a retirement home. Now called Cassiobury Court, the buildings have been Grade II listed and are now used as a drug rehabilitation centre.

The Cassiobury Estate also included a dower house, Little Cassiobury, which has also survived to the present day. It may have been designed by Lady Elizabeth Wilbraham (the first woman architect), and is estimated to have been built in 1690. Under the supervision of the Portmeirion architect Clough Williams-Ellis there were renovations and extensions to the house in 1937–38. Soon after that Hertfordshire County Council bought Little Cassiobury in 1939 under a compulsory purchase order. They used part of its land to build Watford College and the house was used as an education office for most of the 20th century. Now vacant, Little Cassiobury is listed as "grade II*" and, due to its deteriorating condition, is classed as "at risk" by the English Heritage Buildings at Risk Register.

The Cassiobury Estate past & present

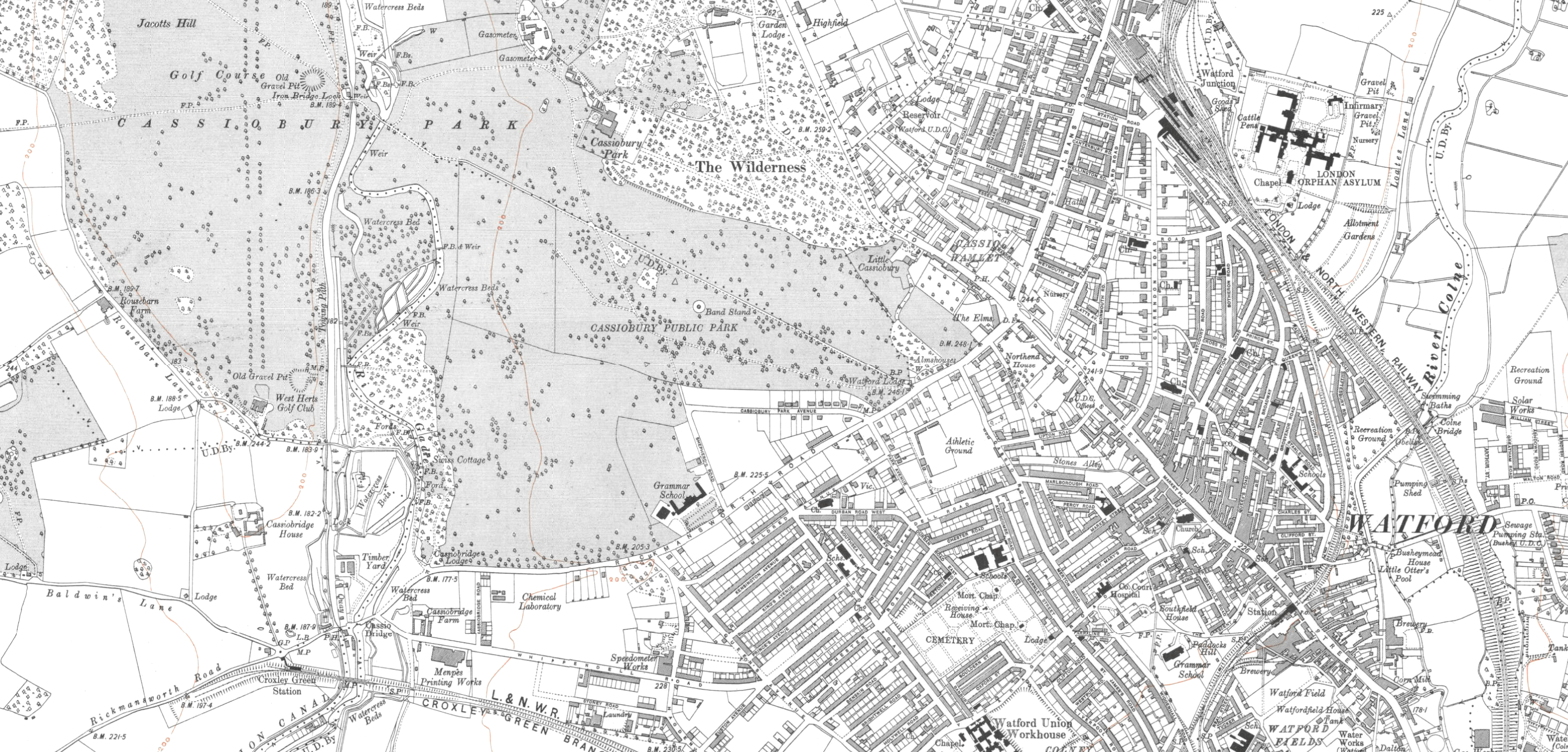
1920 OS map of Watford showing the Cassiobury Estate

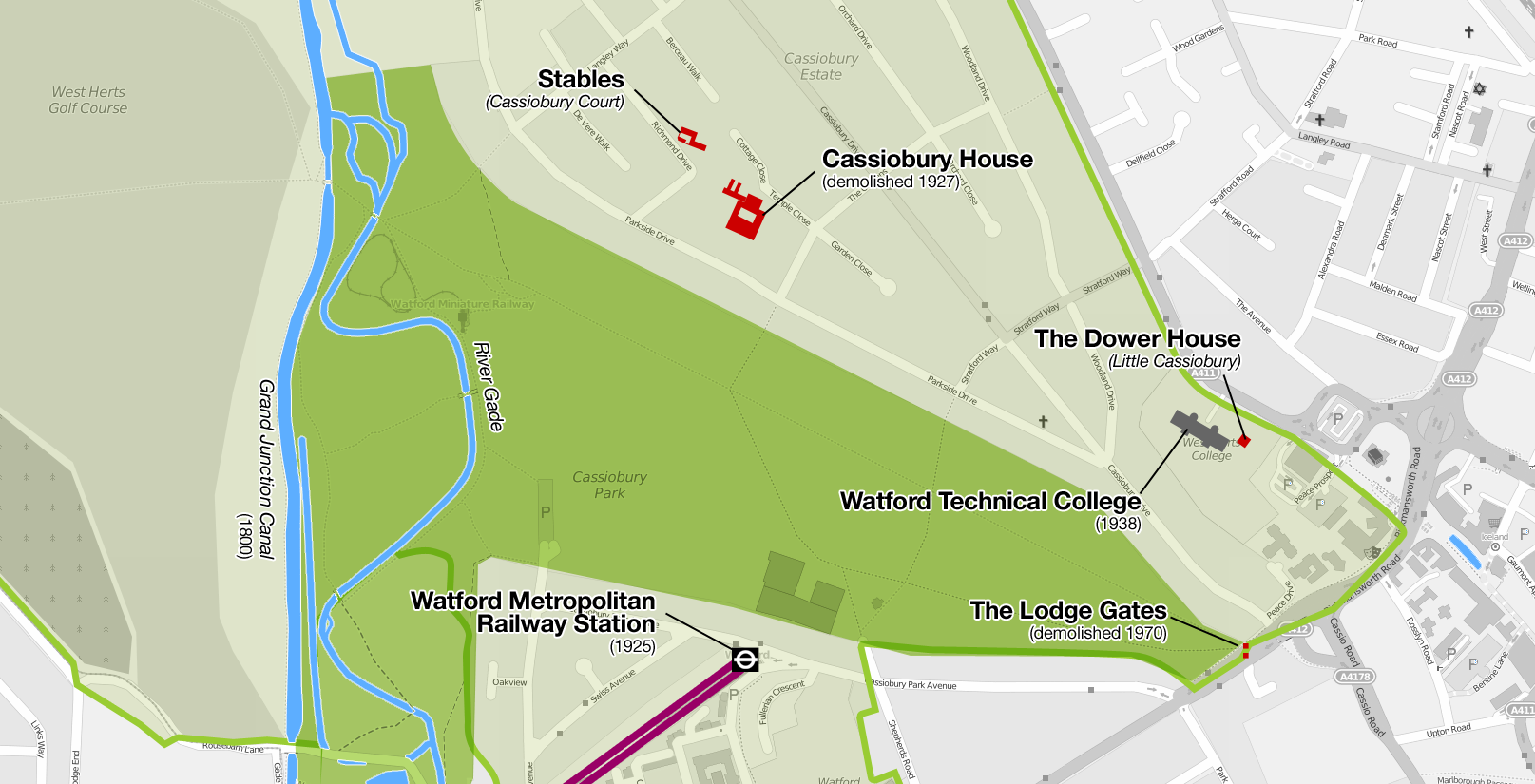
Modern map of Watford showing the site of Cassiobury House, now covered by suburban homes

== The Essex Chapel ==
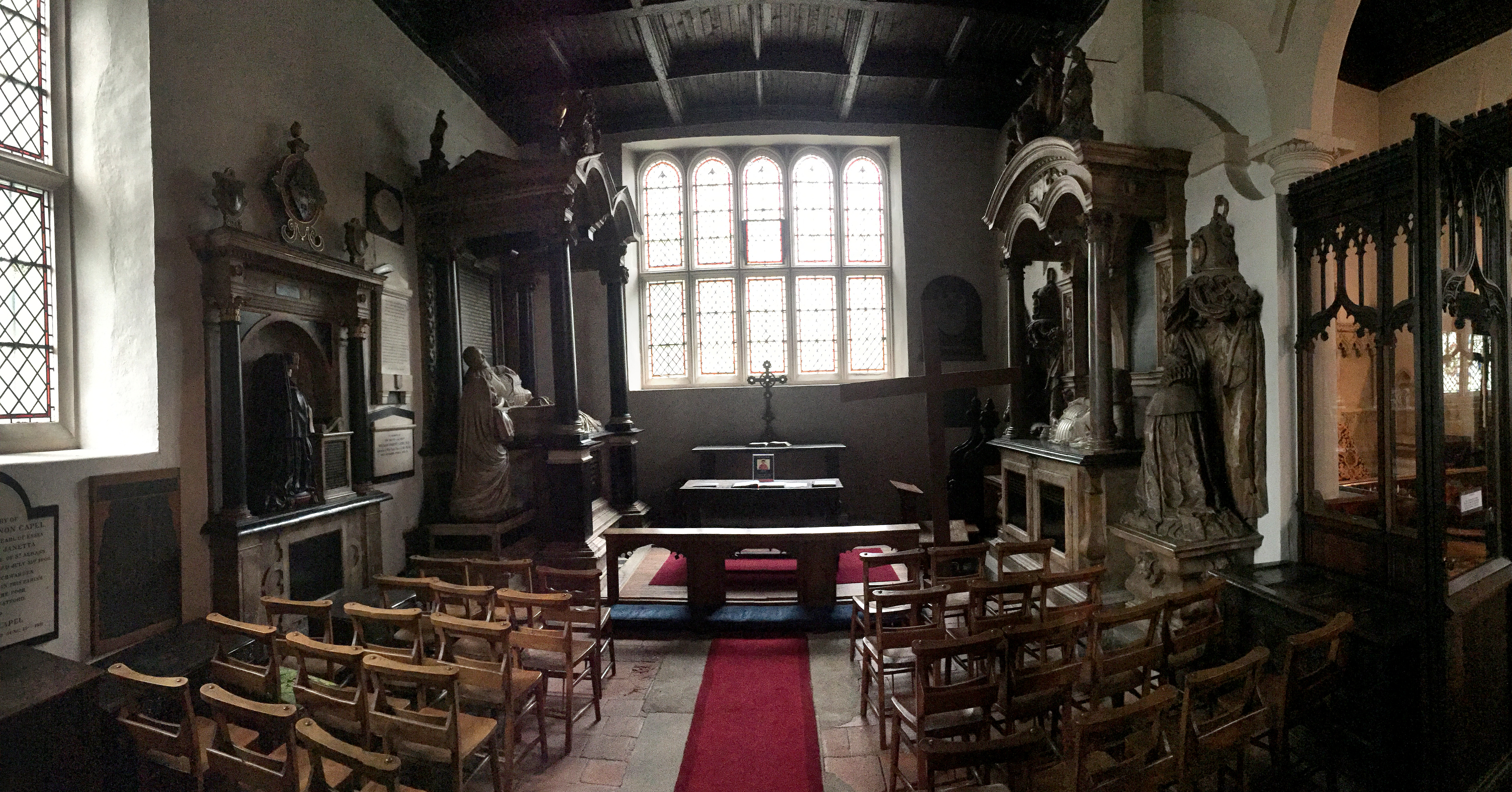
The Essex Chapel in Saint Mary's

The Parish Church of St Mary, Watford, 1.24 miles (2.00 km) south-east of Cassiobury House, was the burial place for the Morison and Capel families. In 1595, the church vestry was converted into a memorial chapel by Bridget, Dowager Countess of Bedford and widow of Sir Richard Morison, and Francis Russell, 2nd Earl of Bedford.

The Essex Chapel (originally known as the Morison Chapel) can be seen in Saint Mary's today. Described by Pevsner as "the chief glory of Watford Church", the chapel is noted for its large, ornate wall monuments by the sculptor Nicholas Stone. On the south side is the memorial to Sir Charles Morison (d.1599), and opposite is another to his son and heir, Sir Charles Morrison, 1st Baronet (d.1628). Both are lavishly decorated and feature sculpted effigies of the deceased and their family members. Monuments to various Earls of Essex are mounted on the chapel walls.

In Saint Mary's churchyard can be found the grave of George Edward Doney, a servant at Cassiobury House, who originated in the Gambia. He was captured and sold in to the slave trade as child. After he was brought to Cassiobury he was granted his freedom and remained as a paid servant at the house for 44 years.

== See also ==
- Cassiobury
- British country house contents auctions
- Destruction of country houses in 20th-century Britain
