= Capel family =

Painting by Cornelius Johnson

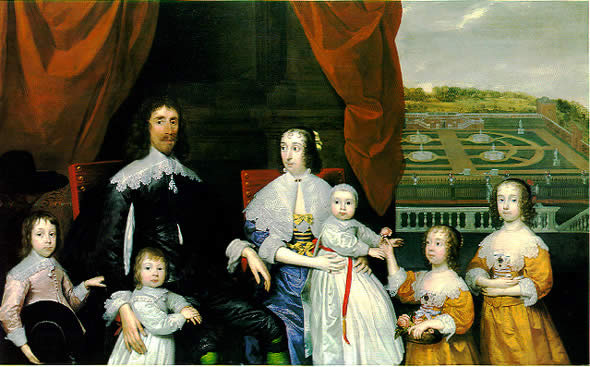
Arthur Capel, 1st Baron Capel of Hadham, and his Family, by Cornelius Johnson.

The Capel Family is one of the few group portraits by Cornelius Johnson, who is better known for head and shoulders portraits.

== The Portrait ==
The portrait was painted in oil on canvas around 1641 and is 63 inches (160 cm) by 102 inches (260 cm).

It shows Arthur Capel, his wife, Elizabeth Morrison and their children, Mary, Henry, Charles, Elizabeth and Arthur. In the background is the garden at Little Hadham.

It is on display at the National Portrait Gallery in London. The portrait was probably commissioned to mark Capel's appointment as Baron Capel in 1641.

== Provenance ==
It was bought from Leggatt Brothers in 1970 for £28,350, £3,000 of which was contributed by ArtFund. The provenance was given as Cassiobury, the family home of the earls of Essex. C. H. Collins Baker notes that it was at Cassiobury in 1912.

== The Literature ==
The arrangement of the figures is greatly influenced by Van Dyck's portrait of the family of King Charles I and by Honthorst's portrait of the Buckingham family.

It has been used to illustrate differences in gender status in England in the 16th and 17th century.
