= Arthur Capell, 1st Earl of Essex =

English noble

The Right Honourable The Earl of Essex PC
- Portrait by Peter Lely

First Lord of the Treasury
- In office 1679–1679
- Preceded by: The Earl of Danby
- Succeeded by: The Earl of Rochester

Lord Lieutenant of Ireland
- In office 1672–1677
- Preceded by: The Lord Berkeley of Stratton
- Succeeded by: The Duke of Ormonde

Personal details
- Born: c. 1631 Hadham Hall, Little Hadham, Hertfordshire.
- Died: 13 July 1683 Tower of London, London, England.
- Spouse: Lady Elizabeth Percy
- Children: Algernon Capell, 2nd Earl of Essex; Anne Capell, Countess of Carlisle
- Parent(s): Arthur Capell, 1st Baron Capell of Hadham; Elizabeth Morrison

Arms of Capell: Gules, a lion rampant between three cross-crosslets fitcheé or

Arthur Capell, 1st Earl of Essex (c. 1631 – 13 July 1683), also spelt Capel, of Cassiobury House, Watford, Hertfordshire, was an English statesman.

== Early life ==
He was the son of Arthur Capell, 1st Baron Capell of Hadham (executed in 1649) by his wife Elizabeth Morrison, daughter and heiress of Sir Charles Morrison, 1st Baronet (1587–1628) of Cashiobury House, Watford, Hertfordshire. He was baptised on 2 January 1632.

== Youth ==
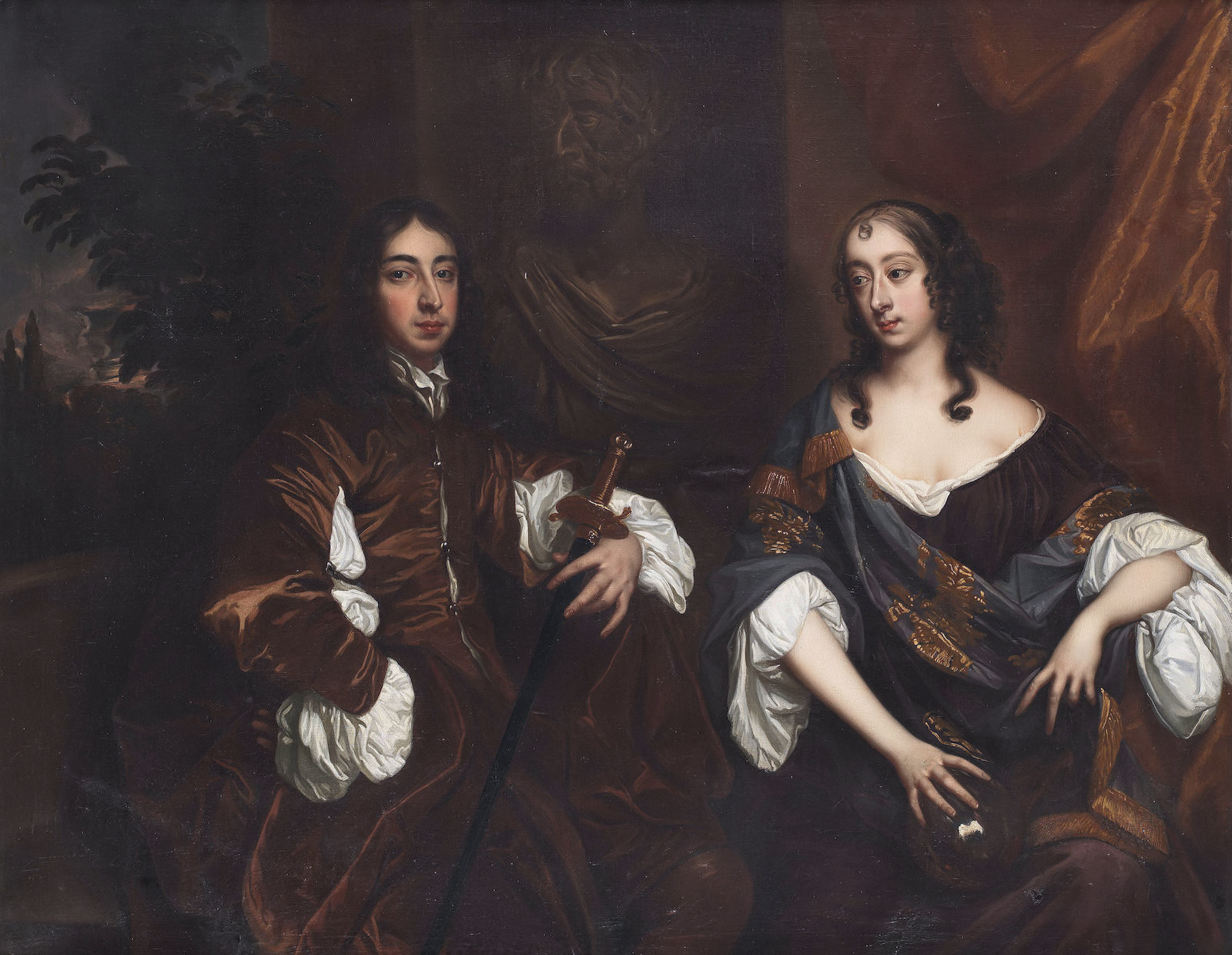
Arthur Capel, 1st Earl of Essex and his wife Elizabeth, Countess of Essex, by studio of Peter Lely

In June 1648, then a sickly boy of sixteen, he was taken by Lord Fairfax's soldiers from Hadham to Colchester in Essex, which town his father was defending, and was carried every day around the works with the hope of inducing Lord Capell to surrender the town.

== Political career ==
At the Restoration of the Monarchy, he was created on 20 April 1661 Viscount Malden and Earl of Essex, the latter earldom having become extinct on the death of Robert Devereux, 3rd Earl of Essex. It was granted with special remainder to the male issue of his father. Capell was also appointed Lord Lieutenant of Hertfordshire and a few years later Lord Lieutenant of Wiltshire.

Early on he showed himself antagonistic to the court, to Roman Catholicism, and to the extension of the royal prerogative. Denzil Holles and Capell were deemed by King Charles II "stiff and sullen men," who would not yield against their convictions to his solicitations. In 1669 he was sent as ambassador to King Christian V of Denmark, in which capacity he gained credit by refusing to strike his flag to the governor of Kronborg.

In 1672 he was made a Privy Councillor and Lord Lieutenant of Ireland. It is clear that he was aligned to Charles's policy in 1672 and supported the Declaration of Indulgence especially in so far as it affected dissenters (and potentially extending this to Catholics, but this was always an ambiguous point).

Essex had already developed a well-known tolerance towards and association with dissenters of all types, but subsequent events showed that this latitude did not apply to Catholics. He remained in office until 1677, and his administration was greatly commended by Burnet and James Butler, 1st Duke of Ormonde, the former describing it "as a pattern to all that come after him". Burnet's viewpoint was not however unbiased, and whilst the administration of Essex's brother as Lord Deputy in 1696 followed such a high-minded approach, his predecessors, such as Clarendon, Tyrconnel and Ormond's own last period as viceroy could not be said to have followed Essex's model. He paid close attention to Irish interests, and took immense pains to understand the constitution and the political necessities of the country, appointing men of real merit to office, and maintaining exceptional independence from solicitation and influence.

He proved to be a conscientious viceroy and, unlike so many other politicians of his age, he quickly showed an acumen for understanding accounts which was to lead to all kinds of challenges with the undertaking of Lord Ranelagh and his partners and with the same lord when he became vice-treasurer of Ireland in 1675. His conflict with Lord Ranelagh, to whom had been assigned the Irish revenues on condition of his supplying the requirements of the crown up to 1675, and whose accounts Essex refused to pass, was in many ways the principled struggle which was ultimately to lead to his recall – it was also an early sign as to how out of step Essex's rectitude was with his contemporaries. He also strongly opposed the lavish gifts of forfeited estates to court favourites and mistresses, prevented the grant of Phoenix Park to the Duchess of Cleveland, and refused to encumber the administration by granting reversions. Finally, the intrigues of his enemies at home, and Charles's continual demands for money, which Ranelagh undertook to satisfy, brought about his recall in April 1677.

He immediately joined the country party and the opposition to Lord Danby's government, and on the latter's fall in 1679 was appointed a commissioner of the treasury, and the same year a member of Sir William Temple's new-modelled Council. Essex is often looked upon as a surprise appointment to his key treasury role, but, based on his experience in Ireland and his ability to go 'toe to toe' with Danby on financial matters, it was in fact a sensible choice for Charles, and gave him the best option for balancing his financial options as the events leading to the Popish plot and Exclusion began to unfold. Essex followed the lead of Lord Halifax, who advocated not the exclusion of James, but the limitation of his sovereign powers, and looked to the Prince of Orange rather than to the Duke of Monmouth as the leader of Protestantism, incurring thereby the hostility of Lord Shaftesbury, but at the same time gaining the confidence of Charles.

He was appointed by Charles together with Halifax to hear the charges against the Duke of Lauderdale. In July 1679 he wrote a wise and statesmanlike letter to the king, advising him to renounce his project of raising a new company of guards. Together with Halifax, he urged Charles to summon the parliament, and after his refusal resigned the treasury in November, the real cause being, according to one account, a demand upon the treasury by the duchess of Cleveland for £25,000, according to another "the niceness of touching French money," "that makes my Lord Essex's squeasy stomach that it can no longer digest his employment." This again is no surprise, for Essex's high principles and sense of personal integrity, and probably his experience of the previous seven years, had made him less pliable and tolerant of the ambiguities in royal policy that made him able to support the Stop of the Exchequer and Royal Declaration of Indulgence in early 1672.

Subsequently, his political attitude underwent a change, the exact cause of which is not clear—probably a growing conviction of the dangers threatened by a Roman Catholic sovereign of the character of James. He now, in 1680, joined Shaftesbury's party and supported the Exclusion Bill, and on its rejection by the Lords carried a motion for an association to execute the scheme of expedients promoted by Halifax. On 25 January 1681 at the head of fifteen peers he presented a petition to the king, couched in exaggerated language, requesting the abandonment of the session of parliament at Oxford. He was a jealous prosecutor of the Roman Catholics in the Popish Plot, and voted for Lord Stafford's attainder. On the other hand, he interceded for Archbishop Plunkett, implicated in the pretended Irish Plot, but the King angrily replied that in view of Essex's closeness to Shaftesbury, Plunkett's blood was on his head: "you could have saved him but would not, I cannot save him for I dare not". Essex, however, refused to follow Shaftesbury in his extreme courses, declined participation in the latter's design to seize the Tower in 1682, and on Shaftesbury's consequent departure from England became the leader of Monmouth's faction, in which were now included Lord Russell, Algernon Sidney, and Lord Howard of Escrick.

Essex took no part in the wilder schemes of the party, but after the discovery of the Rye House Plot in June 1683, and the capture of the leaders, he was arrested at Cassiobury and imprisoned in the Tower.

== Rebuilds Cassiobury House ==
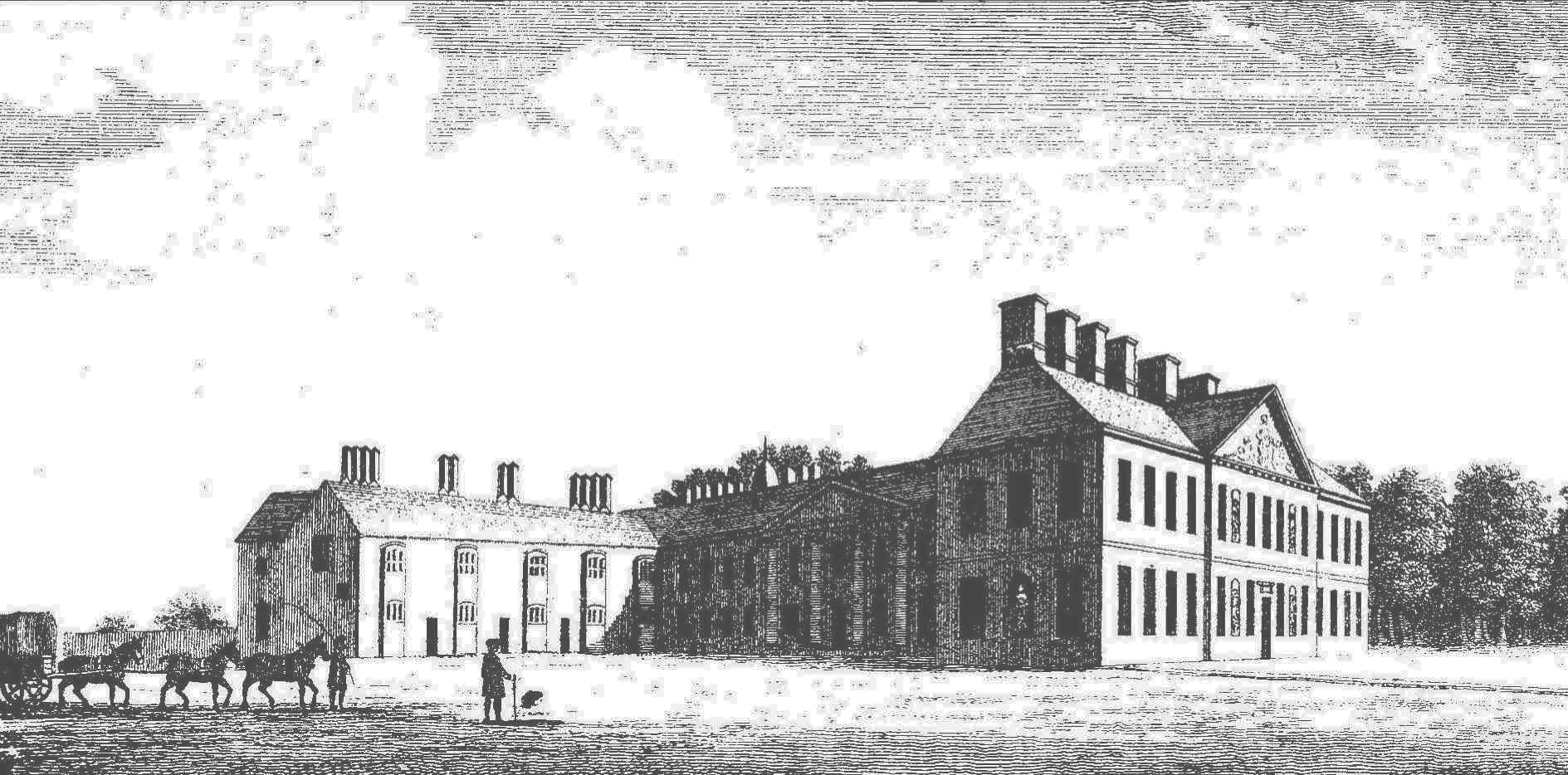
A 1707 woodcut of Cassiobury House, Watford

Between about 1677 and 1680, Arthur Capell rebuilt Cassiobury House in Watford, an ancient Tudor house inherited from his mother, Elizabeth Morrison, daughter and heiress of Sir Charles Morrison, 1st Baronet (1587–1628). At this time, Capell had moved the family seat from Hadham Hall to Cassiobury. The lavish reconstruction was undertaken by the architect, Hugh May. Capell also engaged the services of the leading wood carver of the day, Grinling Gibbons, and of the painter, Antonio Verrio, to create a sumptuous interior. The gardener, Moses Cook, also worked on the estate and dedicated his book The Manner of Raising, Ordering and Improving Forrest Trees (1679) to Capell.

This noted country house, stood for 250 years, until 1927, when like many other British country houses, it was demolished.

== Marriage and children ==
Arthur Capell married Lady Elizabeth Percy, daughter of Algernon Percy, 10th Earl of Northumberland and Lady Anne Cecil, by whom he had children:

- Algernon Capell, 2nd Earl of Essex (1670–1710), only son and heir, who succeeded him in the earldom.
- Lady Anne Capell, wife of Charles Howard, 3rd Earl of Carlisle.

== Death ==
The Earl of Essex died in the Tower of London on 13 July 1683, having been convicted of participation in the Rye House Plot against the King and his brother, and was said to have been discovered in his chamber with his throat cut whilst a prisoner awaiting execution for treason. According to Britton, the Earl of Essex's death, by suicide, was controversial:

Lawrence Braddon., Gent of the Middle Temple states himself 'upwards of 5 years persecuted or imprisoned for endeavouring to discover this murther the third day after the same was committed' The Dictionary of National Biography entry for Braddon says:-

"When the Earl of Essex died in the Tower in 1683, Braddon adopted the belief that he had been murdered, and worked actively to collect sufficient evidence to prove the murder. He set on foot inquiries on the subject in London, and when a rumour reached him that the news of the earl's death was known at Marlborough on the very day of, if not before, the occurrence, he posted off thither. When his action became known at court, he was arrested and put under restraint. For a time he was let out on bail, but on 7 Feb. 1683–4 he was tried with Mr. Hugh Speke at the king's bench on the accusation of conspiring to spread the belief that the Earl of Essex was murdered by some persons about him, and of endeavouring to suborn witnesses to testify the same. Braddon was found guilty on all the counts, but Speke was acquitted of the latter charge. The one was fined 1,000l. and the other 2,000l., with sureties for good behaviour during their lives. Braddon remained in prison until the landing of William III, when he was liberated."

His death was attributed, quite groundlessly, to Charles and James, and the evidence points clearly if not conclusively to suicide, his motive being possibly to prevent an attainder and preserve his estate for his family. Gilbert Burnet, who knew Essex well, accepted that his death was suicide since Essex had often spoken of suicide as an honourable course. Lord Ailesbury wrote: "The Earl asked very coldly for a razor to cut his nails, and being accustomed so to do gave no manner of suspicion. He went into a small closet," where his servant afterwards found him "dead and wallowing in blood"... the assumption being that the reason he "cutt his own throat with a knife" was because of his knowledge of the Rye House Plot. The King, who seemed genuinely distressed at the news of his death, remarked that Essex should have known that he would spare him, "for I owe him a life", Essex's father having died in the service of Charles I.

== Legacy ==
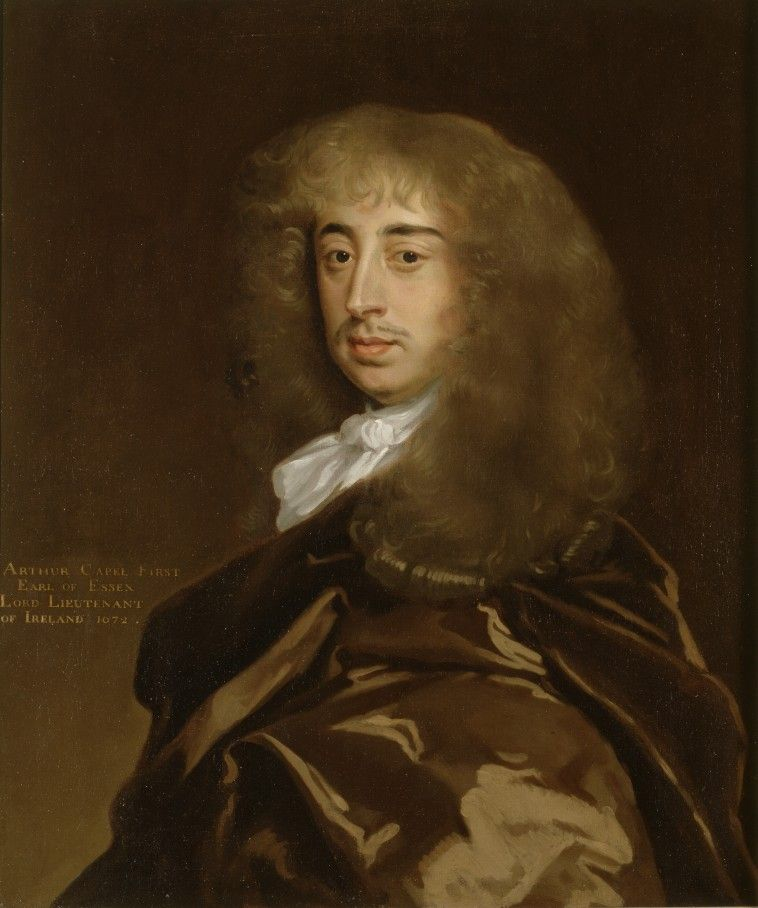
Portrait by Peter Lely

He was known as a statesman of strong and sincere patriotism, just and unselfish, conscientious and laborious in the fulfilment of public duties, and blameless in his official and private life. John Evelyn describes him as "a sober, wise, judicious and pondering person, not illiterate beyond the rule of most noblemen in this age, very well versed in English history and affairs, industrious, frugal, methodical and every way accomplished"; and declares he was much deplored, few believing he had ever harboured any seditious designs. Capel Street in Dublin's north inner city is named after him.

Political offices
Preceded by The Lord Berkeley of Stratton	Lord Lieutenant of Ireland; 1672–1677	Succeeded by The Duke of Ormonde
Preceded by The Earl of Danby (Lord High Treasurer)	First Lord of the Treasury; 1679	Succeeded by Laurence Hyde
Honorary titles
English Interregnum	Lord Lieutenant of Hertfordshire; 1660–1681	Succeeded by The Earl of Bridgewater
Preceded by The Earl of Clarendon	Lord Lieutenant of Wiltshire; 1668–1672	Succeeded by The Duke of Somerset
Peerage of England
New creation	Earl of Essex; 1661–1683	Succeeded by Algernon Capell
Preceded by Arthur Capell	Baron Capell of Hadham; 1649–1683	Succeeded by Algernon Capell
