= Moses Cook =

Moses Cook (d. 1715) was an English landscape gardener who worked for Arthur Capell, 1st Earl of Essex designing the park and gardens at Cassiobury House.

== Gardening career ==
In 1661, after the Stuart restoration, Arthur Capell was created Earl of Essex and regained Hadham Hall, which had been at the home of his father, Arthur Capell, 1st Baron Capell of Hadham. He had been executed by the parliamentarians in 1649. Moses Cook worked as a gardener here at least until 1666. However, despite spending some time developing Hadham Hall, the Earl of Essex turned his attention to Cassiobury House – which had also belonged to his father – taking Cook along as his gardener. Here he made his mark designing the park and gardens at Cassiobury House. The bookseller, Peter Parker, published his The Manner of Raising, Ordering; And Improving Forest and Fruit-Trees in 1676, with a second edition published alongside Gabriel Plattes A Discovery of Subterranean Treasure in 1679. The diarist John Evelyn remarked of Cassiobury in 1680:

"The gardens are very rare, and cannot be otherwise, having so skilful an artist to govern them as Mr. Cooke, who is, as to the mechanic part, not ignorant in mathematics, and pretends to astrology. There is an excellent collection of the choicest fruit."

In 1681 Cook was one of the original partners who joined George London in founding Brompton Park Nursery in Kensington. He withdrew from this partnership in 1689.

== Family life ==
Moses had a son – also called Moses – who was born in 1665 and attended Christ's College, Cambridge in 1679. He subsequently became rector of Sible Hedingham.
