= George Edward Doney =

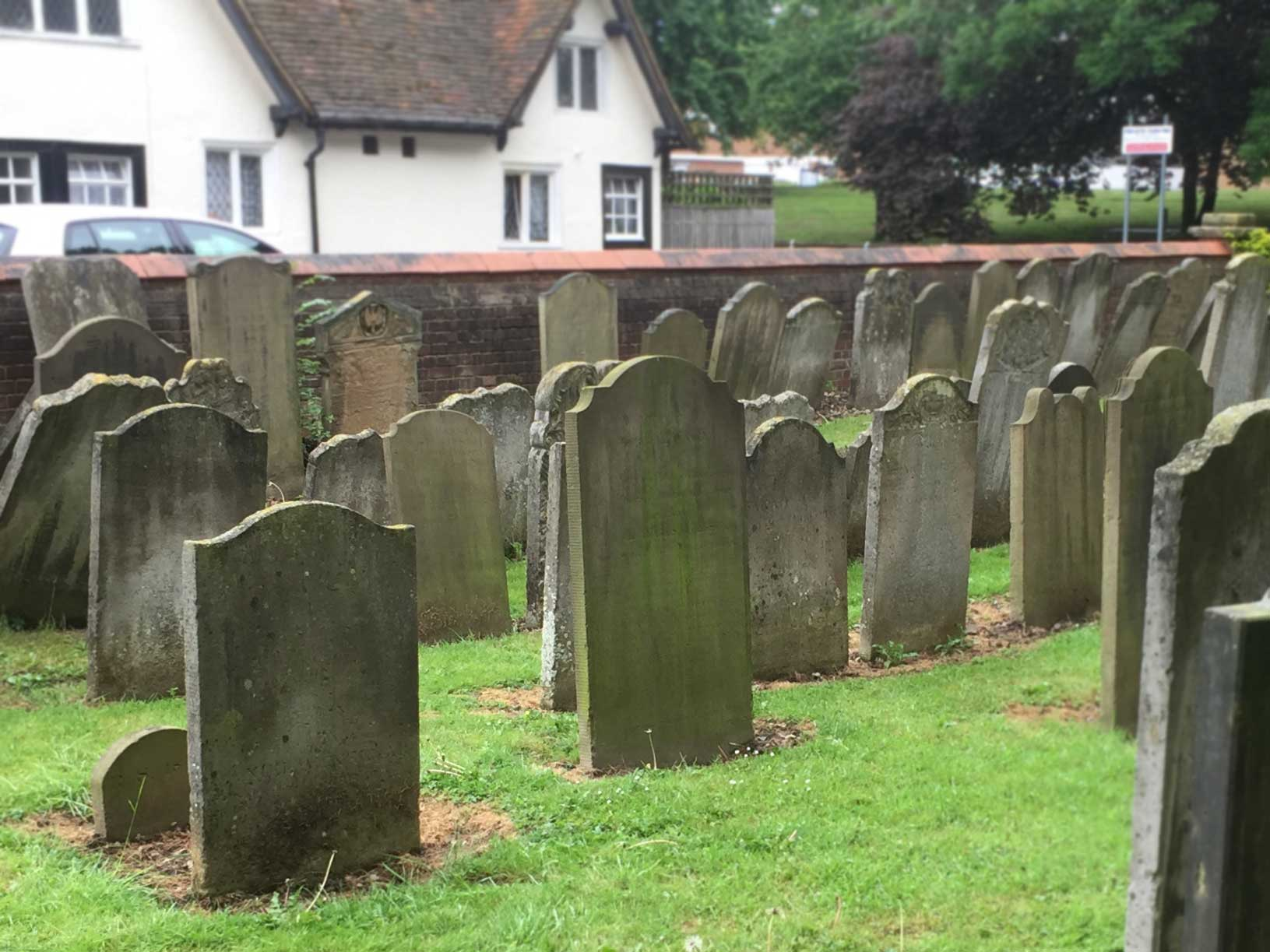
George Edward Doney's grave in St Mary's Churchyard, Watford

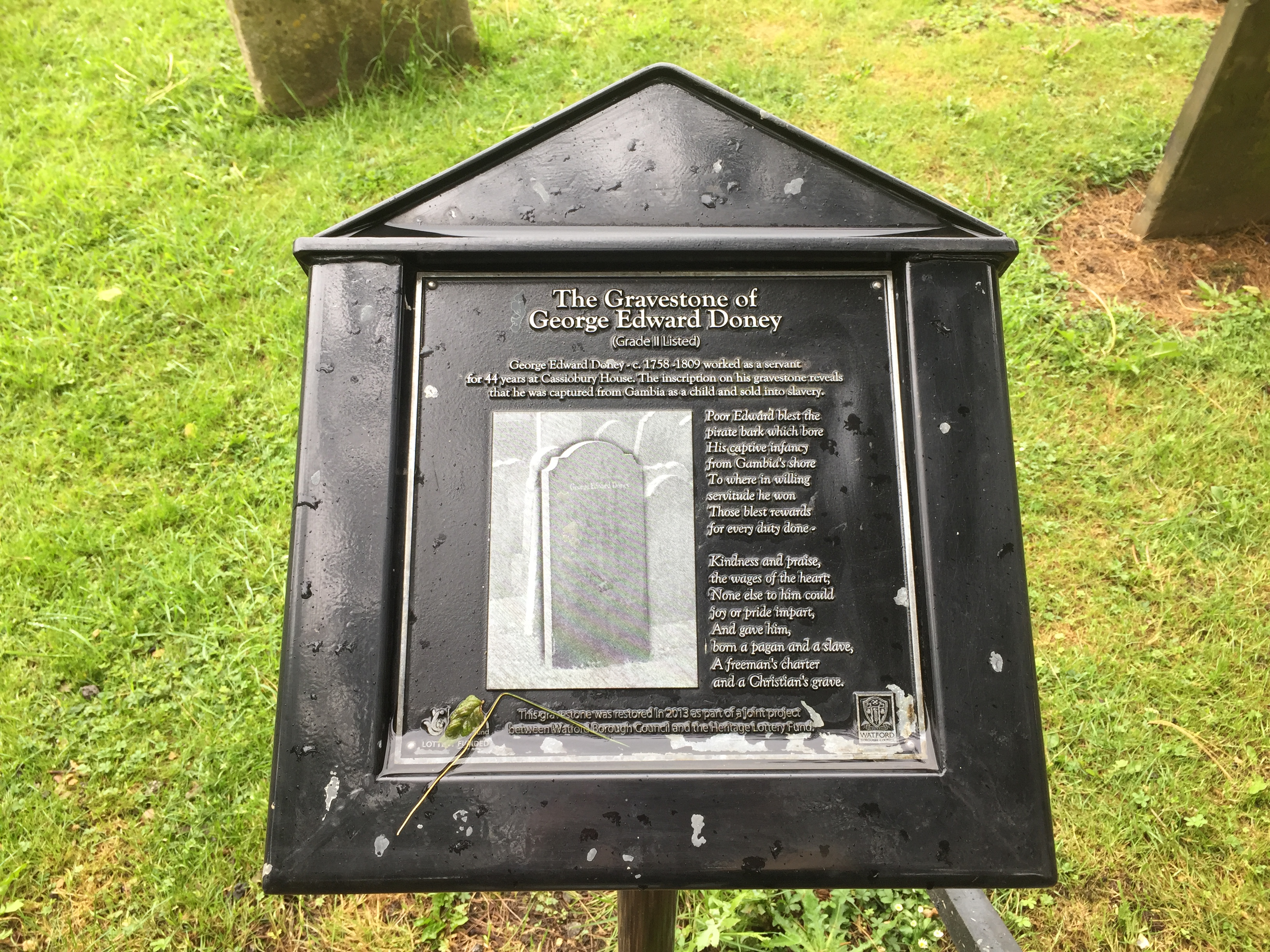
Information about Doney's gravestone at St Mary's Church

George Edward Doney (~1758–1809) is believed to have been born in Gambia (then claased as part of Guinea (region)) around 1758. He was transported to Virginia as a young boy and sold into slavery. He came to Watford, Hertfordshire in around 1765 as a servant for the Earl of Essex at Cassiobury House, continuing to serve the family for 44 years.

He achieved respect and status at Cassiobury House and was baptized at St Mary's Church, Watford on 1 August 1774. George Capel-Coningsby, 5th Earl of Essex and the Countess of Essex were among the list of subscribers to the autobiography of Olaudah Equiano, a formerly enslaved person who was influential in the abolitionist movement.

== Depiction in art ==
An unfinished painting from c.1809, Harvest Home, by J. M. W. Turner on his second visit to Cassiobury, depicts a black servant at a harvest dinner in one of the barns at Cassiobury House. Black figures have featured in many Western paintings but were typically shown at the edge of the canvas as peripheral, subordinate characters; Turner's positioning of the servant in the main group of people is thought to indicate that this was a high-ranking servant in the Cassiobury household, and this is likely Doney himself.

== Death and burial ==
Doney died a freeman in 1809, two years after the British abolition of the Atlantic slave trade. His burial at St Mary's Church occurred on 8 September 1809, and a handsome headstone with an original poetic epigraph was erected in the churchyard. The gravestone was given Grade II listed status in 2008.
