= Hugh May =

English architect (1621–1684)

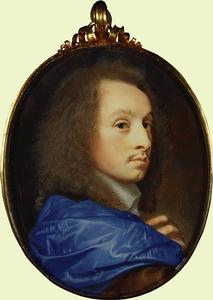
Hugh May

Hugh May (1621 – 21 February 1684) was an English architect in the period after the Restoration of King Charles II. He worked in the era which fell between the first introduction of Palladianism into England by Inigo Jones, and the full flowering of English Baroque under John Vanbrugh and Nicholas Hawksmoor. His own work was influenced by both Jones' work, and by Dutch architecture. Although May's only surviving works are Eltham Lodge, and the east front, stables and chapel at Cornbury Park, his designs were influential. Together with his contemporary, Sir Roger Pratt, May was responsible for introducing and popularising an Anglo-Dutch type of house, which was widely imitated.

== Biography ==
Hugh May was the seventh son of John May of Rawmere, in Mid Lavant, West Sussex, by his wife, Elizabeth Hill, and was baptised on 2 October 1621. He was a first cousin of Baptist May, Charles II's Keeper of the Privy Purse. As a member of a Royalist family, Hugh May spent the years of Oliver Cromwell's Commonwealth in the service of George Villiers, 2nd Duke of Buckingham. May arranged the transport of artworks from the Duke's York House to Holland, where the Duke was in exile. Here, May was exposed to recent developments in Dutch Classical architecture, and the simple but refined brick-built houses designed by Jacob van Campen and Pieter Post. May was a friend of the painter Peter Lely, and in 1656 the two of them travelled to Charles II's court in exile. Besides Lely, May's circle included Samuel Pepys, who called May a "very ingenious man", Roger North and John Evelyn, whom May assisted in translating Roland Fréart's Parallel of Architecture. No drawings by May survive, and he perhaps relied on draughtsmen instead. He died at the age of 63, and was buried in the church at Mid Lavant.

== Houses ==
At the Restoration of Charles II, May was rewarded for his loyalty by being appointed Paymaster of the King's Works on 29 June 1660. His architectural commissions came from Court acquaintances, and his first completed work was Eltham Lodge, Kent (1663–1664), for Sir John Shaw, 1st Baronet. Built in brick, with a stone pediment and Ionic pilasters, the double-pile house reflected Dutch influence. Cornbury House, Oxfordshire (1663–1668), was built in a similar style, but with a Corinthian pediment, for Edward Hyde, 1st Earl of Clarendon. May's most prominent house was Berkeley House, on Piccadilly, London (1664–1666, demolished 1733), for Lord Berkeley. It was again in the same style, but with the addition of quadrant colonnades, a feature derived from Palladio, and which was again much imitated. At Cassiobury, Hertfordshire (1674, demolished 1922), May added wings to the home of Arthur Capell, 1st Earl of Essex, and redesigned some of the interiors, giving the woodcarver Grinling Gibbons his first major commission. It is possible that May was the architect of the first Burlington House, for Sir John Denham, and he certainly advised Richard Boyle, 1st Earl of Burlington after he purchased the house in 1667. He was also involved in construction or alterations at Chilton Lodge, Berkshire (1666, rebuilt), Holme Lacy, Herefordshire (1673–1674), and Moor Park, Hertfordshire (1679–1684, rebuilt).

May's houses drew on contemporary Dutch classicism, as exemplified by the Mauritshuis (1636–1641), and introduced an economical, yet classically refined, style of house into England. Simpler than the work of Jones, or Pratt, the style was widely imitated, for example at Melton Constable, Norfolk (1665), or Ramsbury Manor, Wiltshire (1681–1686). May's and Pratt's developments of Inigo Jones' works influenced their contemporary Sir Christopher Wren, and spread to Scotland in the work of Sir William Bruce.

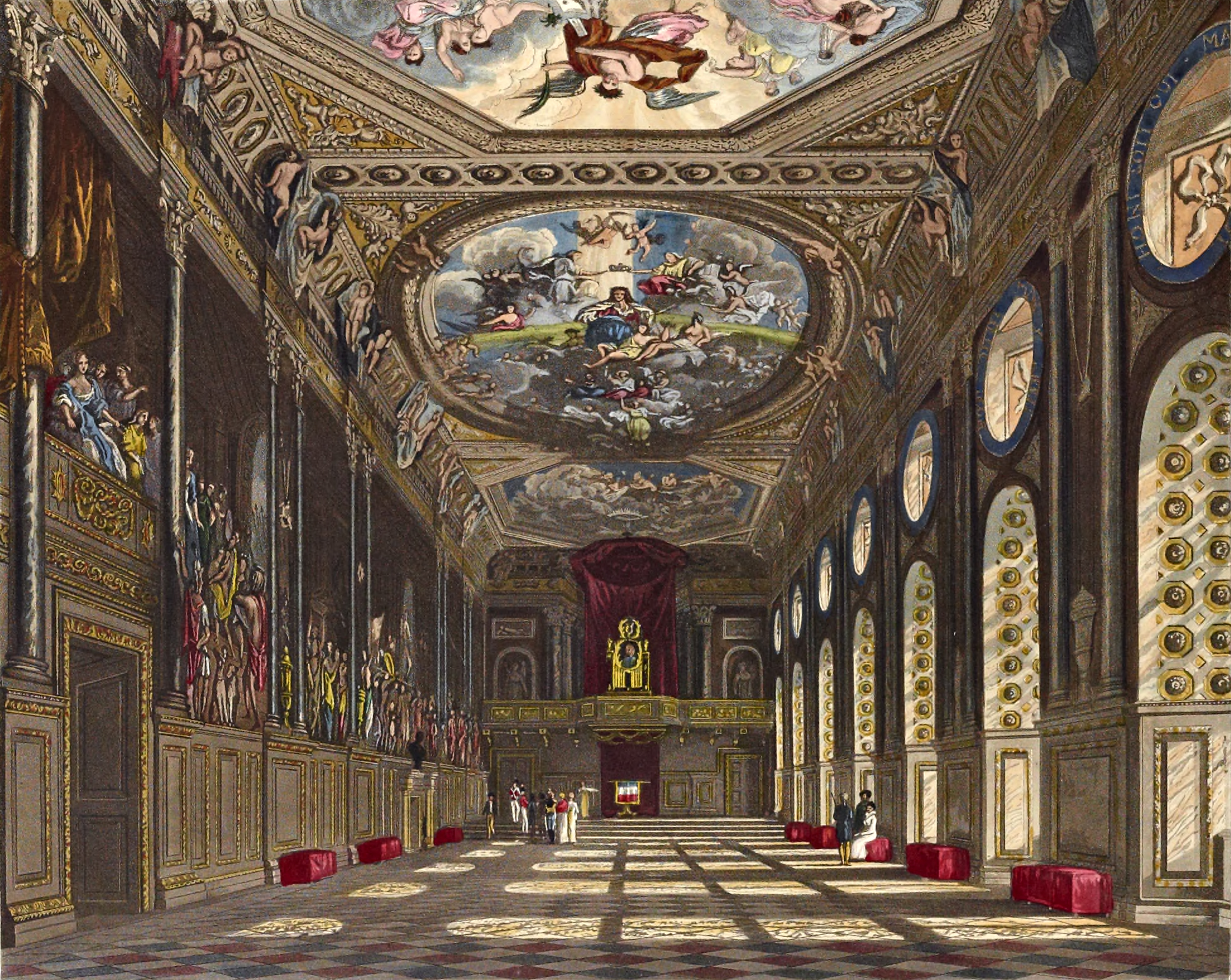
St George's Hall, Windsor Castle, in 1819

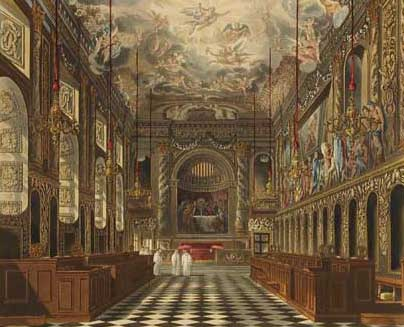
Royal Chapel, Windsor Castle, in 1819

== Rebuilding London ==
Following the Great Fire of London, in September 1666, May was one of the three "Commissioners for Rebuilding the City of London", appointed by Charles II. The others were Roger Pratt and Christopher Wren, and along with three representatives of the City of London, Robert Hooke, Edward Jerman and Peter Mills, they were charged with surveying the damage, and promoting methods of rebuilding. The commissioners' work led to two acts of Parliament for rebuilding, the Rebuilding of London Act 1666 and the Rebuilding of London Act 1670, although May's role in the reconstruction work was limited.

== Windsor Castle ==
In June 1668, May was promoted to Comptroller of the King's Works, and was also appointed Clerk to the Recognizances, an office of the Court of Common Pleas. In November 1673, he was further appointed Comptroller of the Works at Windsor Castle, where, from 1675, he remodelled the upper ward, adding to the apartments of Queen Catherine of Braganza, and built St George's Hall and the Royal Chapel. Again working with Gibbons, and the painter Antonio Verrio, May created a series of baroque interiors, the grandest of which, St George's Hall, served as a model for Wren's Great Hall at Greenwich Palace. The hall was demolished in 1826, when Sir Jeffry Wyatville remodelled the castle for George IV, although the Queen's Audience Chamber and Presence Chamber survive in altered form.

Court offices
| Preceded by James Wethered | Comptroller of the King's Works; 1668 - 1684 | Succeeded by William Talman |
