= George London (landscape architect) =

English nurseryman, garden designer and landscape architect (c. 1640–1714)

- Born: c. 1640
- Died: 1714
- Occupation: Garden designer
- Works: Hanbury Hall
- Children: Henrietta London

George London (c. 1640–1714) was an English nurseryman and garden designer.

George London's birth date is not certain but it was probably about 1640. Switzer tells us that he was trained by John Rose (d. 1677), gardener to Charles II. Rose had trained under André Le Nôtre and encouraged London's enthusiasm for the baroque style, which was reinforced by a visit to France. It was probably Rose who recommended London to Henry Compton, when he became Bishop of London in 1675 and began to stock the garden at Fulham Palace, Fulham. By 1681 London was also gardener to Henry Bennet, 1st Earl of Arlington and at two gardens in Bedfordshire, presumably ones he had designed.

London was the principal founding partner in the Brompton Park Nursery, Kensington in 1681. The other partners were Moses Cook, Lucre, gardener to the Queen Dowager at Somerset House, and Field, gardener to the Earl of Bedford, at Bedford House, Strand, in London. The nursery's first major commission was for the garden at Longleat. He would spend about a quarter of each year visiting the great estates around the country, seeking orders for the nursery. Henry Wise (1653–1738) was his apprentice, and the two later worked as partners on parterre gardens at Hampton Court (where they designed Hampton Court Maze), Blenheim Palace, Melbourne Hall, Chatsworth, Chelsea Hospital, Castle Howard, and Wimpole Hall. London, appointed royal gardener to Queen Mary, was dismissed when Queen Anne came to the throne in 1702, but replaced by Wise, so their nursery was not affected.

His garden designs at Hanbury Hall near Bromsgrove have been re-instated using plans, contemporary surveys and archaeological evidence.

London married his first wife Rebecca Walkes, presumably the mother of all five of his children, in July 1679 at St Botolph's, Aldersgate. In January 1706 he married Jane Branston at St Botolph-without-Bishopsgate. His third wife was Elizabeth Denton, who he married late in 1710.

London died on 12 January 1714, leaving a house in St Martin-in-the-Fields, farms in Surrey and an interest in Welsh lead mining, in addition to his share in the Brompton nursery. William Talman, with whom he had worked at Hampton Court, was one of his executors. His black grave slab is inside All Saints Church, Fulham, where he is buried with his third wife Elizabeth and near his first wife Rebecca.

His daughter Henrietta, a botanical artist, married Sir John Peachey, 2nd Baronet.
