= Cassiobury =

Residential area in Hertfordshire, England

Coordinates: 51.66°N 0.401°W

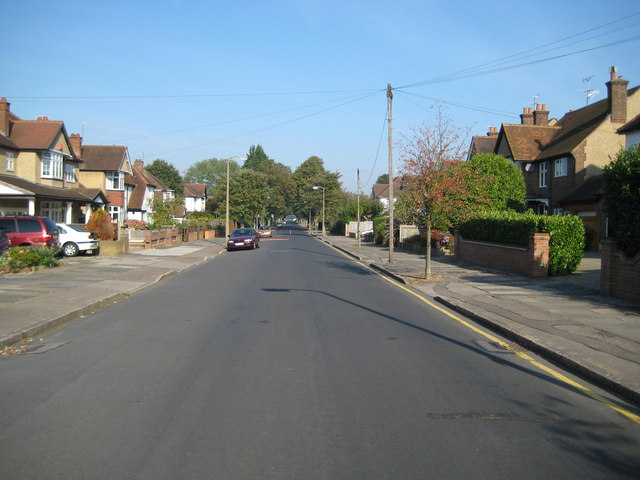
- Cassiobury Drive

- Location within Hertfordshire
- Population: 1,781
- OS grid reference: TQ106969
- District: Watford
- Shire county: Hertfordshire
- Region: East
- Country: England
- Sovereign state: United Kingdom
- Post town: WATFORD
- Postcode district: WD17 WD18
- Dialling code: 01923
- Police: Hertfordshire
- Fire: Hertfordshire
- Ambulance: East of England
- UK Parliament: Watford

The Cassiobury Estate is a suburban residential area of Watford in Hertfordshire, England. It is bounded to the south by Cassiobury Park, the main public park in the town, to the west by playing fields next to the River Gade, and to the northeast by Hempstead Road. It is mostly characterised by 1930s Mock Tudor houses.

To the northwest of Cassiobury, outside the Borough of Watford in the Three Rivers District, is The Grove, the former estate and house of the Earls of Clarendon. This has been converted into a luxury hotel and with extensive grounds.

== History ==
The suburban streets of Cassiobury were laid out in the early 1930s on land that was formerly part of the estate of Cassiobury House, the ancestral seat of the Earls of Essex. The house, which originally dated from the reign of Queen Elizabeth I, contained lavishly decorated interiors and a substantial art collection and was surrounded by landscaped park land. Parts of the Cassiobury estate were sold for development land in 1908, and following the death of the 7th Earl of Essex in 1916, the family put the rest of estate up for sale in order to pay for death duties. Unable to find a buyer for the house, they had Cassiobury House demolished in 1927 and the estate was partly sold to Watford Borough Council to be used as a public park, with the remaining land sold to developers such as William King & Co and Charles Brightman for housing development.

With the extension of the Metropolitan Railway to Watford in 1926, residential development around the new Watford tube station grew rapidly as the homes of Metro-land were constructed over the site of the former Essex mansion, and Humphry Repton's landscaped vistas gave way to suburban lawns. The area of land once occupied by Cassiobury House is now where Temple Close sits, close to the Cassiobury Tennis Club.

Although the Essex mansion house no longer exists, traces of the area's noble past remain; the Cassiobury House stable block (built c. 1805–1815) still stands on Richmond Drive; now called Cassiobury Court, the buildings have been Grade II listed and are now used as a drug rehabilitation centre. Several residential street names recall former Earls of Essex; Coningesby Drive, Devereux Drive, De Vere Walk and Capelvere Walk all bear names of former Lords of Cassiobury House.

The Cassiobury Estate past & present

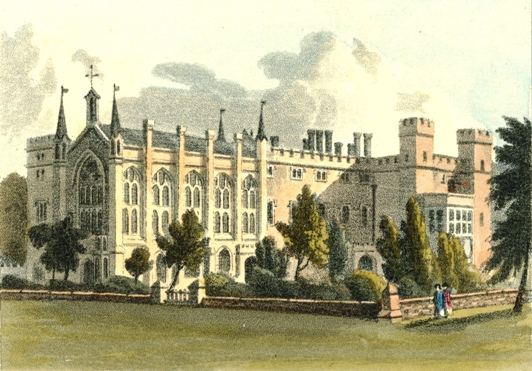
Old Cassiobury House

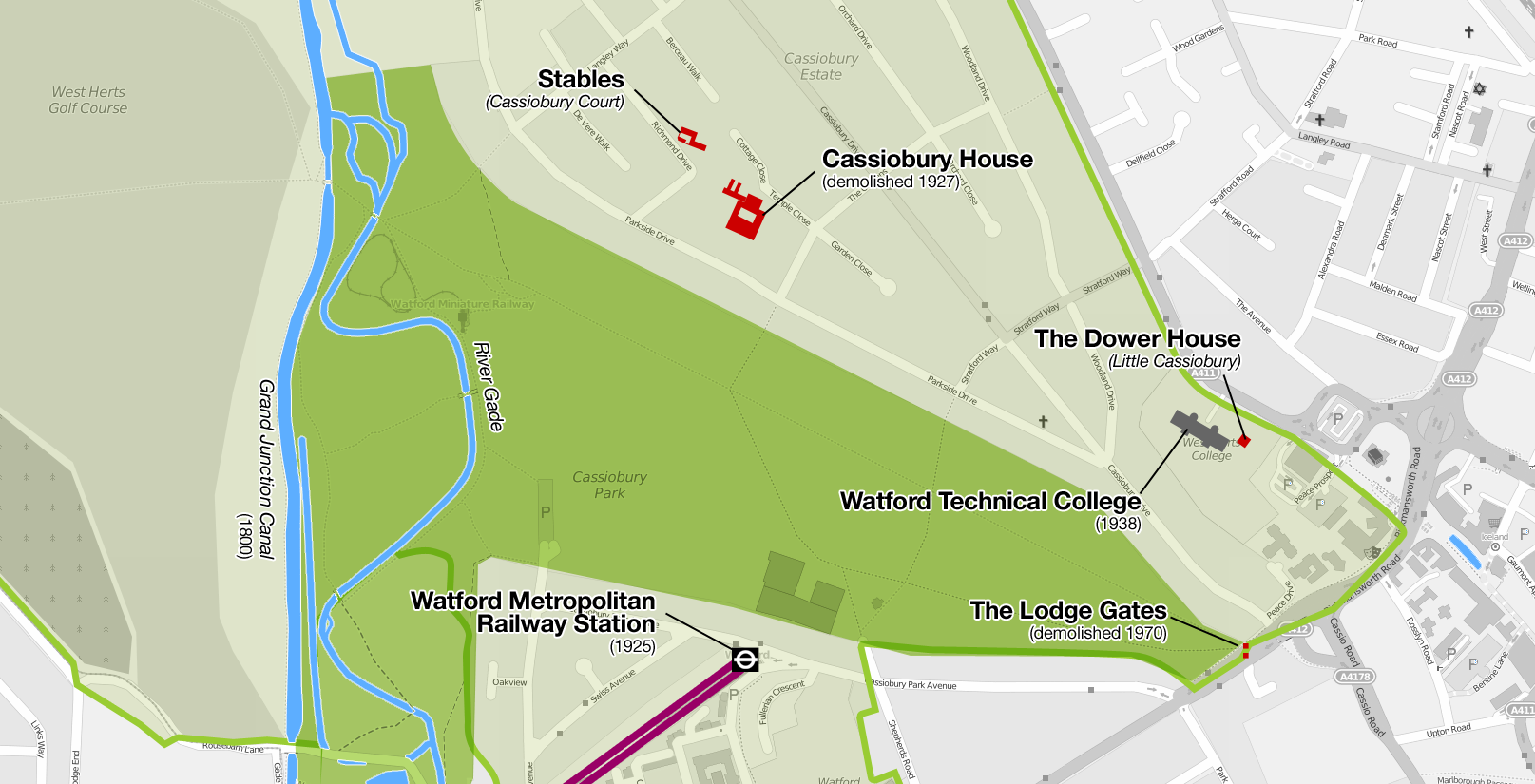
Modern map of Watford showing the site of Cassiobury House, now covered by suburban homes

== Transport ==
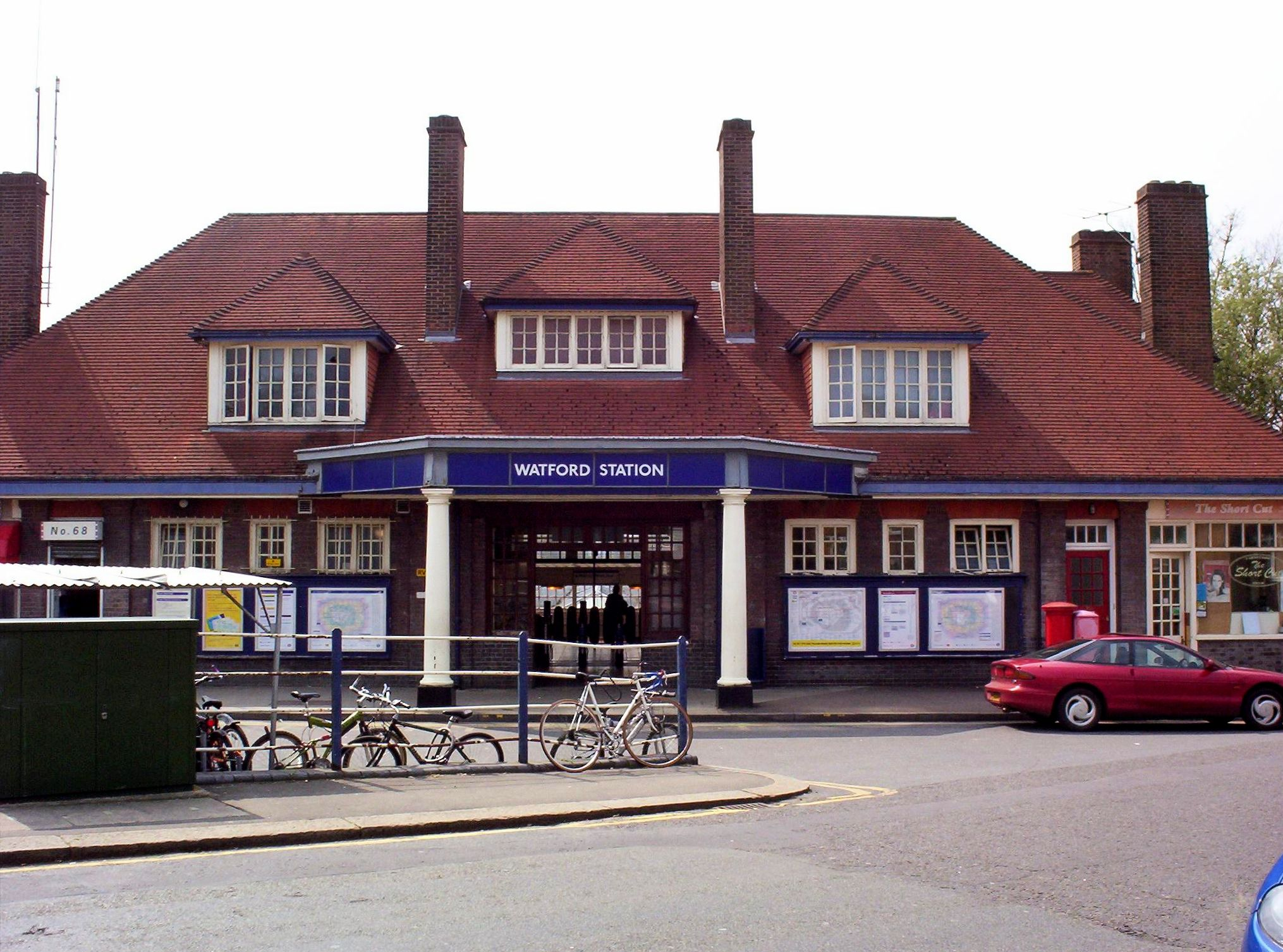
Watford Underground Station

The area is currently served by a London Underground station, Watford tube station, on Cassiobury Park Avenue, which is the terminus of the Metropolitan line's Watford branch. This station is planned to close in the future when the line is diverted to terminate at Watford Junction as part of the Croxley Rail Link project; after this, Cassiobury will be served by a new Cassiobridge tube station instead, approximately 870 metres (0.54 mi) south of the current station.
