= Henry Wylde =

English composer, conductor and music critic (1822 - 1890)

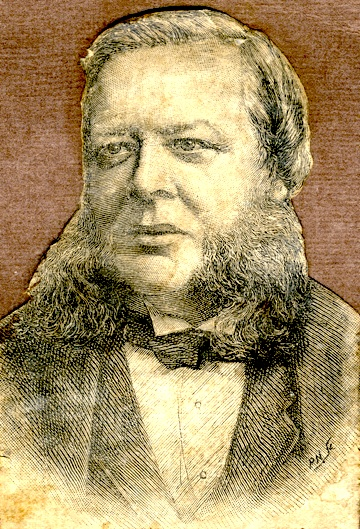
Dr Henry Wylde, 1822–1890

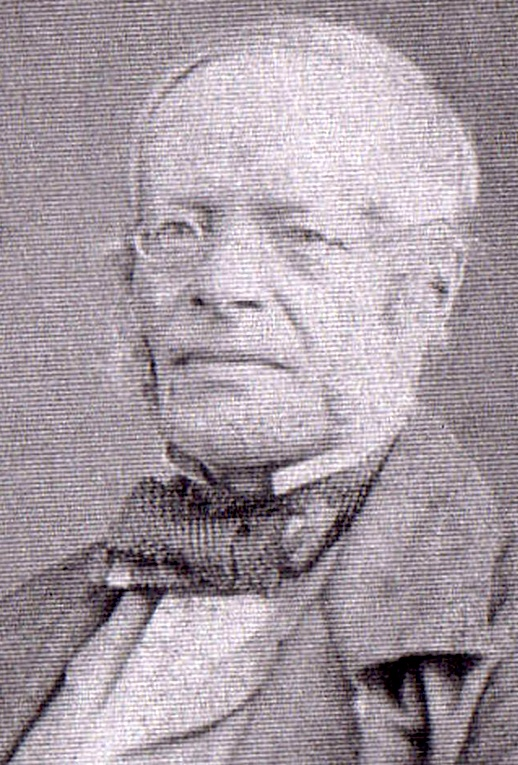
Henry Wylde the elder, 1795–1876

Henry Wylde (22 May 1822 – 13 March 1890) was an English conductor, composer, teacher and music critic.

== Background ==
Henry Wylde was born at Bushey, Hertfordshire, elder son of Henry Wylde (1795–1876) and Martha Lucy née Paxton. His father, then the organist at St. Mary's Church, Watford, was himself a music teacher. Henry, the father, one of the Children of the Chapel Royal was for many years vicar choral of the Chapels Royal and cantor there and he was a soloist at the marriage of Queen Victoria.

Young Henry's mother's Durham based Paxton family included the 18th century musicians Stephen Paxton (c.1734–1787) and his elder brother William Paxton (1725–1778). Both, originally cathedral choristers, became cellists and composers. William remained based in Durham but the better-known Stephen had moved to London by 1756 and the next year was elected a member of the Royal Society of Musicians. Not as well known but also active in London were Frances, a church organist and the brothers' nephew (died 1779) also a cellist.

The vicar of Watford was the genial Hon. William Robert Capel (1775–1854), cricketer for Homerton and W R Capel's XI, later a chaplain to Queen Victoria. Capel, who might reduce his sermon to a very few minutes to be sure of catching a train to a foxhunt, wished to encourage a revival of the then moribund art of church music and its use in services. Capel stood sponsor at the baptism of Henry's younger brother, James, and may be safely presumed to have been a strong influence in young Henry's early career. About 1832 a new room was added to the Wylde house at Stone Grove and the Cassiobury House music library brought to it.

== Youth ==
When aged thirteen young Henry was organist of Whitchurch, St Lawrence, Little Stanmore, near his parents' house at Stone Grove, Edgware on the edge of the small park that 100 years earlier had held the mansion of Cannons. Cannons was the short-lived house of James Brydges, Duke of Chandos, where Handel had been house composer 1717–1719. While Handel was at Cannons the ducal chapel was still being constructed, but Brydges had already rebuilt the local parish church, St Lawrence, Whitchurch, to his baroque taste. Here Handel's church music was performed, the Chandos Te Deum and the Chandos Anthems. At the east end of the church is the organ used by Handel, the organ case carved with cherubs and pea pods and attributed to Grinling Gibbons.

When a boy, Henry Wylde was educated privately and at Westminster School. He became a pupil of Ignaz Moscheles at the age of sixteen and studied under Cipriani Potter at the Royal Academy of Music, where he was later appointed Professor of Harmony.

From 1844 to 1846 he was organist at the Wren church, St Anne and St Agnes, in Gresham Street. He resigned to take up his teaching post at the Royal Academy of Music.

Wylde had previously been admitted to Trinity College, Cambridge and his degree of Doctor of Music was conferred on 4 April 1851.

== Public life ==
Dr Henry Wylde was appointed one of the musical jurors representing England for the Great Exhibition. In 1852 he encouraged and participated in the founding of the New Philharmonic Society, and from 1858 to 1879 directed their concerts. Rehearsals were thrown open to the public from 1859. These concerts were not limited to classical music and they acquired a reputation for novelties. Berlioz was their first conductor but he soon fell out with Wylde, whose attitudes to the playing were considered by the musicians to be excessively academic. Wylde was the first to provide programme notes to the audience. After the first season Berlioz moved on and attendances fell. Later performances were conducted in conjunction with Lindpaintner and Spohr and after Wylde's retirement, under Wilhelm Ganz. It was at one of these concerts that Wagner's Lohengrin was heard for the first time.

== Academic life ==
He succeeded Edward Taylor as the Royal Academy's Gresham Professor of Music in July 1863 holding that post until his death. In 1867 he founded and was principal of the London Academy of Music. He wrote several books on music and composition, and served as the music critic of the Echo newspaper. His students included composer and pianist Kate Ralph.

Dr Henry Wylde married Jane, only child of Captain Henry Shuttleworth RN of Bayswater at St Peter's Notting Hill on 28 January 1858. His wife was able to assist in the funding of his public concerts. They had one son, Henry, who showed no special musicianship but who married and died in Melbourne Australia; and two daughters: Edith Baroness von Verschuer, wife of a German army officer and Amy Carmichael, wife of a London stockbroker. His eldest sister, Lucy Marianne, married entomologist James Charles Dale, his younger brother, James, emigrated to New Zealand in July 1853 taking his harp with him.

After a short illness Henry Wylde died of bronchitis, aged 67, intestate, at 76 Mortimer Street, Regent Street, London W1. He is buried at Kensal Green Cemetery in London. He may have parted from his wife, she married Alexander Ritchie Leask in 1894.

== Publications ==
Wylde's books include:

- Music in its art-mysteries (London, Booth,1867);
- Harmony and the science of music: Complete in one volume (Cramer, 1871);
- Occult principles of music (A.S. Mallett, 1871);
- The evolution of the beautiful in sound: A treatise, in two sections. Tracing up the origin, history, and gradual evolution of the modern series of musical ... the most ancient ages to the present time.(J. Heywood, 1888)

See the links to online copies below. Reprints may be purchased from UK and USA online booksellers.

His compositions include:

- When Gathering Clouds, after an air by Handel, with parts for piano and singing;
- A setting of Paradise Lost and a cantata Prayer and Praise

== Notes ==
- F. G. Edwards, ‘Wylde, Henry (1822–1890)’, rev. David J. Golby, Oxford Dictionary of National Biography, Oxford University Press, 2004
- G. Grove, A dictionary of music and musicians
- 'Obituary:Henry Wylde', Musical Times, 1 April 1890
- John H Sainsbury A Dictionary of Musicians 1824 and 1827
- Family records
