= Bridget Radcliffe, Countess of Sussex =

English noblewoman

The Right Honourable The Countess of Sussex
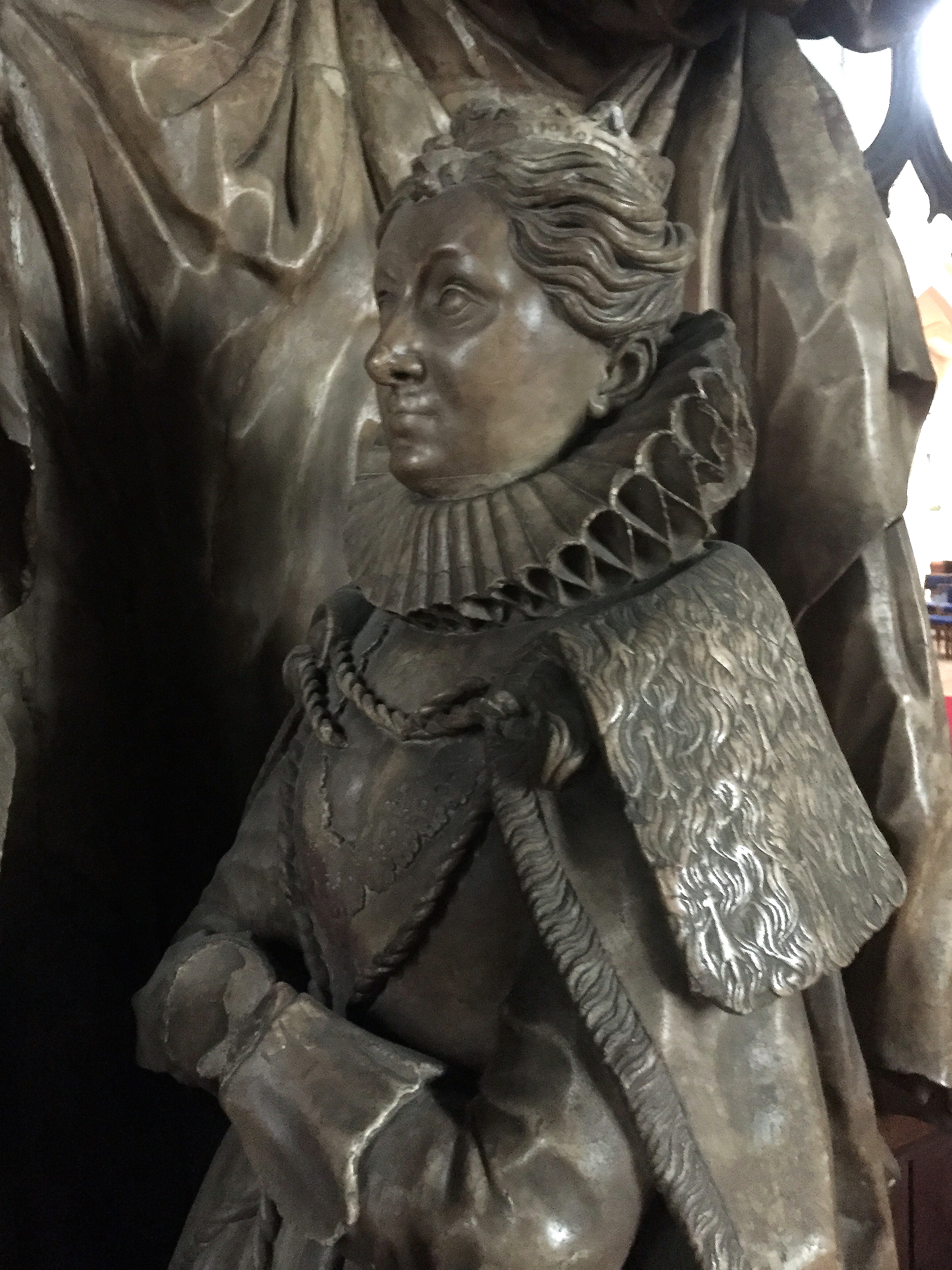
- Effigy of Bridget Morison, daughter of Sir Charles Morrison the elder (1549-1599) in the Essex Chapel, St Mary's Parish Church, Watford, Hertfordshire.
- Other names: Bridgett; Alexandra; The Right Honourable and Virtuous Lady Radclyffe; Lady Fitzwalter; Countess of Sussex; Lady Sussex
- Born: c. 11 Mar 1575; Watford, Hertfordshire, England
- Died: Dec. 1623; Clerkenwell, Middlesex, England
- Spouse: Robert Radclyffe, 5th Earl of Sussex
- Issue: Honour Radcliffe; Elizabeth (Radcliffe) Ramsey; Thomas Radcliffe; Henry Radcliffe
- Father: Charles Morison
- Mother: Dorothea (Clerke) Morrison

Bridget (Morrison) Radcliffe, Countess of Sussex (c. 1575 – 1623) was an English noblewoman.

== Career ==
Bridget was a daughter of Sir Charles Morison of Cassiobury, Hertfordshire. She married Robert Radclyffe, 5th Earl of Sussex in 1592 in Clerkenwell, Middlesex, England. They had four children:

- Elizabeth (Radcliffe) Ramsey, (1594—1618), who married John Ramsay, 1st Earl of Holderness on 9 Feb 1608 at Whitehall Palace. The wedding was celebrated with the masque The Hue and Cry After Cupid.
- Henry Radcliffe (1596–1620) married Jane Stanhope, daughter of Michael Stanhope.
- Thomas Radcliffe (1597–1619)
- Honour Radcliffe, (1598–1613)

Contemporaries praised Bridget's wit, grace, charm, and beauty (see expressions given in the dedications below). Her marriage was not solid. John Manningham chronicled in his Diary, 12 October 1602, that the Earl was unfaithful, treated her cruelly, and that before 1602 she and her children separated from Sussex, who allowed her £1,700 a year.

The text from Manningham's diary regarding this unfortunate situation is:

The Earle of Sussex keepes Mrs Sylvester Morgan (sometyme his ladies gentlewoman) at Dr Daylies house as his mistress, calls hir his Countesse, hyres Captain Whitlocke, with monie and cast suites, to brave his Countess, with telling of hir howe he buyes his wench a wascote of £10, and puts hir in hir veluet gowne, &c.: thus, not content to abuse hir by keeping a common wench, he striues to invent meanes of more greife to his lady, whoe is of a verry goodly and comely personage, of an excellent presence, and a rare witt. Shee hath brought the Earle to allowe hir £1700 a yeare for the maintenaunce of hir selfe and hir children while she lives apart. It is conjectured that Captain Whitlocke, like a base pander, hath incited the Earl to followe this sensuall humour, ... as he did the Earl of Rutland. (J. Bramstone nar.) The Countesse is daughter to the Lady Morrison in Hertfordshire, with whom it is like she purposeth to live. ... A practise to bring the nobilitie into contempt and beggery, by nourishing such as may provoke them to spend all upon lechery and such base pleasures.

In addition to his kept mistress, Mrs. Sylvester Morgan, Bridget's former waiting gentlewoman, the Earl of Sussex had an intimate relationship with Frances Meautas Shute, daughter of Hercules Meautas of West Ham, Essex (c.1548-1587), and Philippa Cooke, widow of Edward Shute. In 1609, the Earl and Frances Meautas had an illegitimate daughter, Jane Radcliff.

Bridget, Countess of Sussex, died in December 1623. The day after she died the Earl of Sussex married his mistress Frances, widow of Francis Shute, daughter of Hercules Meautas, of West Ham. She was a sister of Jane Cornwallis

== Dedications ==
Several authors dedicated books to the Countess of Sussex, including:

- Robert Greene (1592) Greene, who dedicated several works to Robert Radclyffe, 5th Earl of Sussex, dedicated Philomela; The Lady Fitzwalter’s Nightingale to Bridget. An excerpt from the dedication is quoted: your ladyship had far more perfections than years, & more inward excellence than extern beauty, yet so beautiful as few so fair, though none more virtuous, I thought the legend of an honourable and chaste lady would be grateful to your honour, whose mind is wholly delighted in chaste thoughts, keeping herein a perfect decorum to appropriate the nature of the gift to the content of the person.

- Thomas Kyd (1595) Kid translated and adapted Robert Garnier’s 1573 French drama Cornélie. In his dedication of Cornelia to the Countess of Sussex, Kid laments bitter times and broken passions he had recently endured, and promised another dedication Portia which he did not complete before his death in 1594.

- George Chapman (1598) In the prefix to his translation of the Iliad, a sonnet is included for Robert Radclyffe, 5th Earl of Sussex 'with duty always remembered to his honoured countess.'
- William Barley (1596) In his dedication to The Right Honorable and Virtuous Lady Bridgett, Countesse of Sussex, Barley notes her noble and gentle ways, and wishes for her health and happiness. Following his touching dedication, he also composed an Acrostic praise poem for her, showngiven in the below.

CERTAIN VERSES UPON THE ALPHABET OF HER LADYSHIP’S NAME
B	Beauties chief ornament of nature's treasure
R	Richly adorns her heavenly countenance:
I	In wisdom’s school she builds her bower of pleasure,
D	Divine for wit and Godly governance.
G	Garnished with virtue, grace, and modesty,
E	Even in her breast true honor is enrolled.
T	To praise her patience, love, and loyalty,
T	The Muses charge it is with pens of gold.
S	She is the star that gives a golden light
U	Unto posterities, for liberal mind:
S	She puts ambitious covetousness to flight,
S	So bountiful she is so meek and kind,
E	Endless her honor, unspotted is her fame,
X	Xhrist (Christ) grant His glory to this virtuous name.

Three Galliard songs with titles 'of Countesse of Sussex', attributed to Philip Rosseter, are included in William Barley's A New Book of Tabliture for the Orpharion written and published in 1596:

The Countesse of Sussex Galliard f.B1r "P. R."
Another Galliard of the Countesse of Sussex f.B2r "PP"
Another Galliard of the Countesse of Sussex f.B3r "P.R."
