= Robert Radclyffe, 5th Earl of Sussex =

English peer

The Right Honourable Robert Radclyffe KG
- The Earl of Sussex
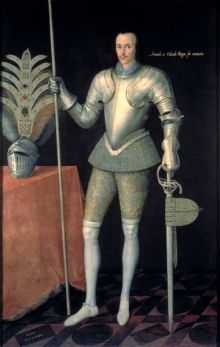
- Robert Radclyffe, c.1590.

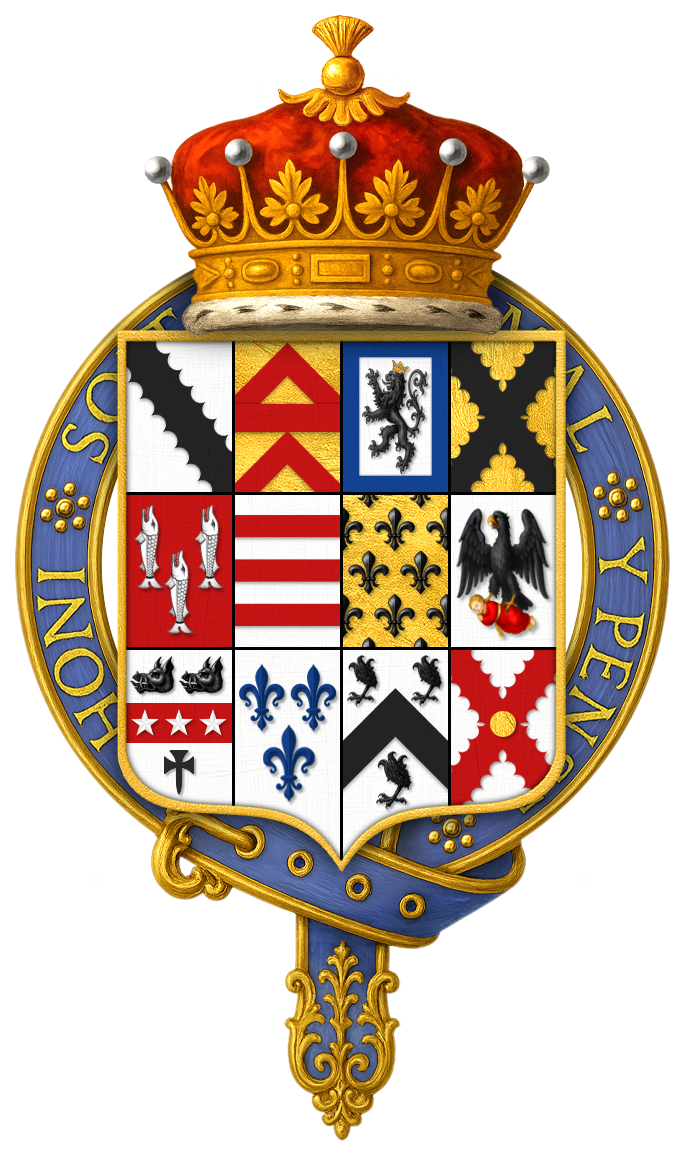
- Coat of arms
- Tenure: 1593–1629
- Predecessor: Henry Radclyffe, 4th Earl of Sussex
- Successor: Edward Radclyffe, 6th Earl of Sussex (as Earl of Sussex); Henry Mildmay, 15th Baron FitzWalter (as Baron FitzWalter)
- Born: 12 June 1573
- Died: 22 September 1629 (aged 56)
- Spouse: Bridget Morrison (m. 1592; died 1623)
- Issue: Henry Radclyffe, Baron Fitzwalter; Hon. Thomas Radclyffe; Lady Elizabeth Radclyffe; Lady Honora Radclyffe

Robert Radclyffe, 5th Earl of Sussex, KG (12 June 1573 – 22 September 1629) was an English peer, ambassador and military officer.

== Life ==
He was the only son of Henry Radclyffe, 4th Earl of Sussex and his wife Honora Pounde, and was known as Viscount Fitzwalter from 1583 until he succeeded his father as Earl on 4 December 1593.

In August 1594 Sussex was sent as ambassador-extraordinary to Scotland with a diplomatic mission and to assist at the baptism of James VI's eldest son, Henry as proxy for Elizabeth I. His companions in Scotland were Lord Wharton, Sir Henry Bromley, Hugh Portman, Henry Guildford, Oliver Cromwell, Thomas Monson, Henry Clare, Edward Greville, Nicholas Sanderson, Edward Gorges, and William Jeffson, with Richard Coningsby and Mr Rolles. The baptism was delayed until the party arrived at Stirling Castle. Sussex had audiences with James VI of Scotland and Anne of Denmark on 29 August and the baptism was held on the next day. Sussex carried the child from his bedchamber to the Chapel Royal and back again. After discussions with James VI about Catholics and Scottish rebels, Sussex left Scotland on 12 September with a gift of silver-gilt plates and was injured by a horse near Northallerton on 14 September.

In 1596 he served with the army sent against Cádiz as colonel of a regiment of foot. He took a prominent part with Horace Vere in the capture of the town and was knighted after the victory there by Robert Devereux, 2nd Earl of Essex on 27 June 1596.

In November 1597 he appealed to Lord Burghley for military employment on the continent. He acted as Earl Marshal of England during the parliaments which sat in the autumns of 1597 and 1601, and was colonel-general of foot in the army of London in August 1599, raised in anticipation of a Spanish invasion; in 1599 also he became a Knight of the Garter. Although implicated in Essex's Rebellion of 1601, he was one of the peers commissioned to try him. He was briefly imprisoned but ultimately released. He was then made lord lieutenant of Essex on 26 August 1603. He was also governor of Harwich and Landguard Fort.

After the Union of Crowns, Essex accompanied Anne of Denmark on her journey south to Windsor Castle. On the way he quarrelled with the Earl of Argyll. At Worksop Manor, the Duke of Lennox and the Earls of Shrewsbury and Cumberland made a proclamation at that her followers should put aside any private quarrels. On 20 July 1603, he petitioned the queen to relieve him of some of the pecuniary embarrassments due to the debts to the crown contracted by the third and fourth earls.

In July 1622 he sold to the Marquis of Buckingham his ancestral estate of Newhall, Essex for £22,000, and resigned to him the lord-lieutenancy of Essex. He was reappointed joint lord lieutenant in 1625. Sussex was frequently at court, carried the purple ermined robe at the creation of Prince Charles as Prince of Wales, 4 November 1616, and bore the orb at the coronation of Charles I on 2 Feb. 1626. He died at his house in Clerkenwell on 22 September 1629, and was buried with his father and uncle in the church of Boreham.

== Patronage ==
Sussex was a patron of writers and men of letters. In 1592 Robert Greene dedicated to him as Lord Fitzwalter Euphues Shadow, by Thomas Lodge. George Chapman prefixed to his translation of the Iliad (1598), a sonnet to him, 'with duty always remembered to his honoured countess.' A sonnet was also addressed to the earl by Henry Lok, in his Sundry Christian Passions, 1597, and Emanuel Ford dedicated to him in 1598 his popular romance Parismus.

== Family ==
Sussex was twice married.

His first wife was Bridget, daughter of Sir Charles Morison of Cassiobury, Hertfordshire. In her honour Robert Greene gave his Philomela the subtitle of The Lady Fitzwa[l]ter's Nightingale, 1592. To her was also dedicated a popular music book, The New Booke of Tabliture, 1596. The marriage was troubled; John Manningham reported in his Diary, 12 October 1602, that the earl treated her cruelly and blamed his companion Edmund Whitelocke, brother of Sir James Whitelocke, who died at Newhall in 1608, and was buried in the earl's family tomb at Boreham. Before 1602 she, with her children, separated from Sussex, who allowed her £1,700 a year (according to Manningham). She died in December 1623. She bore Sussex four children, who all predeceased him;

- Henry Radclyffe, who married, in February 1614, Jane, daughter of Sir Michael Stanhope.
- Thomas Radclyffe.
- Elizabeth Radclyffe, who married John Ramsay, 1st Earl of Holderness, the wedding was celebrated with the masque The Hue and Cry After Cupid on 9 February 1608
- Honora Radclyffe.

Sussex's second wife was Frances, widow of Francis Shute, daughter of Hercules Meautas, of West Ham. She died on 18 November 1627.

Sussex was succeeded by his cousin Edward Radclyffe (1552?-1641), son of Sir Humphrey Radcliffe of Elnestow, Bedfordshire, the second son of Robert Radclyffe, 1st Earl of Sussex.

== Notes ==
Political offices
| Vacant Title last held by The Lord Burghley | Lord Lieutenant of Essex; 1603–1629 with The Earl of Warwick (1625–1629) | Succeeded by The Earl of Warwick; The Earl of Portland |
Peerage of England
| Preceded by Henry Radclyffe | Earl of Sussex; 1593–1629 | Succeeded by Edward Radclyffe |
| Preceded by Henry Radclyffe | Baron FitzWalter; 1593–1629 | Succeeded by Henry Mildmay as de jure baron |
