= Richard Morrison (ambassador) =

English scholar and diplomat (c. 1513 - 1556)

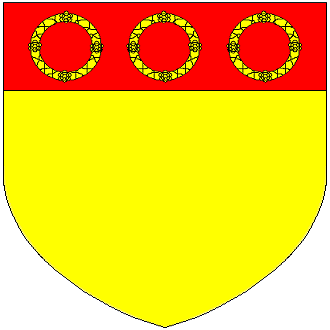
Arms of Morrison: Or, on a chief gules three chaplets of the first

Sir Richard Morrison (or Morison or Morysine) (ca. 1513 – 1556) was an English humanist scholar and diplomat. He was a protégé of Thomas Cromwell, propagandist for Henry VIII, and then ambassador to the German court of Charles V for Edward VI.

== Life ==
Richard Morrison was the son of Thomas Morison of Hertfordshire by a daughter of Thomas Merry of Hatfield. He had a sister, Amy, who married Stephen Hales (d. 27 March 1574), esquire, of Newland, Warwickshire, brother of John Hales.

Morrison attended Cardinal College, Oxford (now Christ Church) ca. 1526 and met Nicholas Udall, who became the master of Eton College and was known as the father of English comedy. He graduated B.A. at Oxford on 19 January 1527–8, and directly entered the service of Thomas Wolsey; but he soon left the cardinal, visited Hugh Latimer at Cambridge, and went to Italy to study Greek. He attended the University of Padua in 1532, making the acquaintance there of Michael Throckmorton. In Italy both these young humanists had links with a group of reformers later called 'spirituali', whom Morison met through contacts with Edmund Harvel and Bishop Cosimo Gheri. He became a proficient if impoverished scholar at Venice and Padua, and retained an interest in literature, along with his adopted Calvinistic religious views.

Writing in February 1536 to Thomas Cromwell, he said that he wished to do something else than be wretched in Italy. Cromwell summoned him home, and gave him an official appointment. Morison and Throckmorton subsequently took up diametrically opposed religious positions: while Throckmorton would embark on a career as agent for Reginald Pole, Morison returned to England to become Henry VIII's propagandist, producing A Remedy for Sedition in response to the Pilgrimage of Grace. Cromwell used a whole coterie of "divers fresh and quick wits" that also included John Bale, John Heywood (C. 1497–1580), William Marshall, John Rastell, Thomas Starkey, and Richard Taverner.

On 17 July 1537, he became prebendary of Yetminster in Salisbury Cathedral, and derived benefit from the Dissolution of the Monasteries. He received the mastership of the hospitals of St. James's, Northallerton, Yorkshire, and St. Wulstan, Worcester, with other monastic grants. The King in 1541 is said to have given him the library of the Carmelites in London.

In 1546 Morison went as ambassador to the Hanseatic League. On Henry VIII's death he was furnished with credentials to the king of Denmark, and ordered by the council to announce Edward VI's accession. On 8 May 1549, he was made a commissioner to visit the university of Oxford, and before June 1550 was knighted. In 1550 Morison replaced Sir Philip Hoby as Ambassador to the Emperor.

Setting off in July, he went with Roger Ascham as his secretary, the two reading Greek every day together. His despatches to the council were long, but Morison found time to travel in Germany with Ascham, who published in 1553 an account of their experiences in A Report of the Affaires of Germany. The emperor frequently remonstrated through Morison about the treatment of the Princess Mary; and he did not altogether like Morison, who was in the habit reading Bernard Ochino's Sermons or Machiavelli to his household 'for the sake of the language.'

After Edward's death, Morison was revoked as ambassador. On 5 August 1553 he and Sir Philip Hoby received a recall for a political gaffe: they had alluded to Guilford Dudley as king in a letter to the council. The next year Morison withdrew to Strasbourg with Sir John Cheke and Anthony Cooke, and spent his time in study under Peter Martyr, whose patron he had been at Oxford. He was at Brussels early in 1555, and is said also to have passed into Italy, but he died at Strasbourg on 17 March 1556.

Morison died a rich man, and had begun to build the mansion of Cashiobury in Watford, Hertfordshire.

== Works ==
Morison's works include:

- 'A lamentation in whiche is shewed what ruyne and destruction cometh of seditious rebellyon,' London, 1536, an indictment of the Lincolnshire Rising.
- 'A remedy for sedition,' London, 1536, an attack on the Pilgrimage of Grace.
- ‘Apomaxis Calumniarum,’ London, 1537, an attack on Cochlæus, who had written against Henry VIII, and who retorted in 'Scopa in Araneas Ricardi Morison Angli,' Leipzig, 1538.
- A translation of the 'Epistle' of Sturmius, London, 1538.
- 'An Invective ayenste the great detestable vice, Treason,' London, 1539, in response to the Exeter Conspiracy.
- 'An exhortation to styrre all Englyshe men to the defence of they're countreye,' London, 1539.
- 'The Strategemes, Sleyghtes, and Policies of Warre, gathered together by S. Julius Frontinus,' London, 1539; translation of a work on tactics by Sextus Julius Frontinus.
- A translation of the 'Introduction to Wisdom' by Juan Luis Vives, London, 1540 and 1544, dedicated to Gregory Cromwell.

He is also said to have written 'Comfortable Consolation for the Birth of Prince Edward, rather than Sorrow for the Death of Queen Jane,' after the death of Jane Seymour on 24 October 1537. 'Defending the Marriage of Preistes', by Philip Melanchthon. is sometimes incorrectly assigned to Morison.

In manuscript are 'Maxims and Sayings,' Sloane MS. 1523; 'A Treatise of Faith and Justification,' Harl. MS. 423 (4); 'Account of Mary's Persecution under Edward VI,' Harl. MS. 353. Morison suggested to king Henry VIII that the popular Robin Hood plays should be suppressed in favour of anti-papist propaganda. His attitude is clear in a Cottonian manuscript entitled A Discourse Touching the Reformation of the Lawes of England (1535):

Howmoche better is it that those [Romish] plaies shulde be forbodden and deleted and others dyvysed to set forthe and declare lyvely before the peoples eies the abhomynation and wickedness of the bishop of Rome, monks, friers, nuns, and suche like ... Into the commen people thynges sooner enter by the eies, then by the eares: remembryng more better that they see then that they here.

== Marriage and issue ==
Morrison married Bridget Hussey, the daughter of John Hussey, 1st Baron Hussey of Sleaford; after his death she remarried twice, in 1561 to Henry Manners, 2nd Earl of Rutland and then in 1566 to Francis Russell, 2nd Earl of Bedford. By her he had a son Sir Charles, and three daughters:

- Jane married to Edward, Lord Russell, son of Francis Russell, 2nd Earl of Bedford, and secondly to Arthur Grey, 14th Baron Grey de Wilton
- Elizabeth to William Norris and secondly to Henry Clinton, 2nd Earl of Lincoln
- Mary to Bartholomew Hales.

Richard's son Charles (1549–1599) completed Cashiobury, which later passed to Charles's son, Charles Morrison (1587–1628). The estate then passed into the Capel family by the marriage of the younger Charles's daughter Elizabeth with Arthur Capell, 1st Baron Capell of Hadham. According to Anthony Wood, Morison left illegitimate children.

By his mistress Lucy Peckham (d. 31 July 1552), the daughter of Thomas Peckham, and wife of Sir George Harper (d. 12 December 1558), Morrison had a son and three daughters. According to the inquisition post mortem taken 18 October 1560, these children were Marcellus Harper (d. 1 February 1559); Frances, who married William Patrickson, gentleman; Mary, who married Bartholomew Hales, gentleman, brother of John Hales; and Anne, who died unmarried.
