= William Capel (sportsman) =

The Honourable & Reverend William Robert Capel (1775–1854), sportsman, Vicar of Watford, Hertfordshire, Rector of Raine, Essex, and a chaplain-in-ordinary to Queen Victoria.

== Family ==
Capel was born 28 April 1775 in England third son of the 4th Earl of Essex and his second wife, Harriet Bladen. The Capel Earls of Essex were seated at Cassiobury Park, Watford, Hertfordshire, and subsequently elected to spell their family's surname Capell.

He married 7 June 1802, Sarah, daughter of T. Samuel Salter, brewer of Moneyhill House, Rickmansworth, and they had three sons and four daughters. He died 3 December 1854 at The Vicarage in Watford, Hertfordshire and was buried at St Mary's in Watford on 8 December.

== Clerical career ==
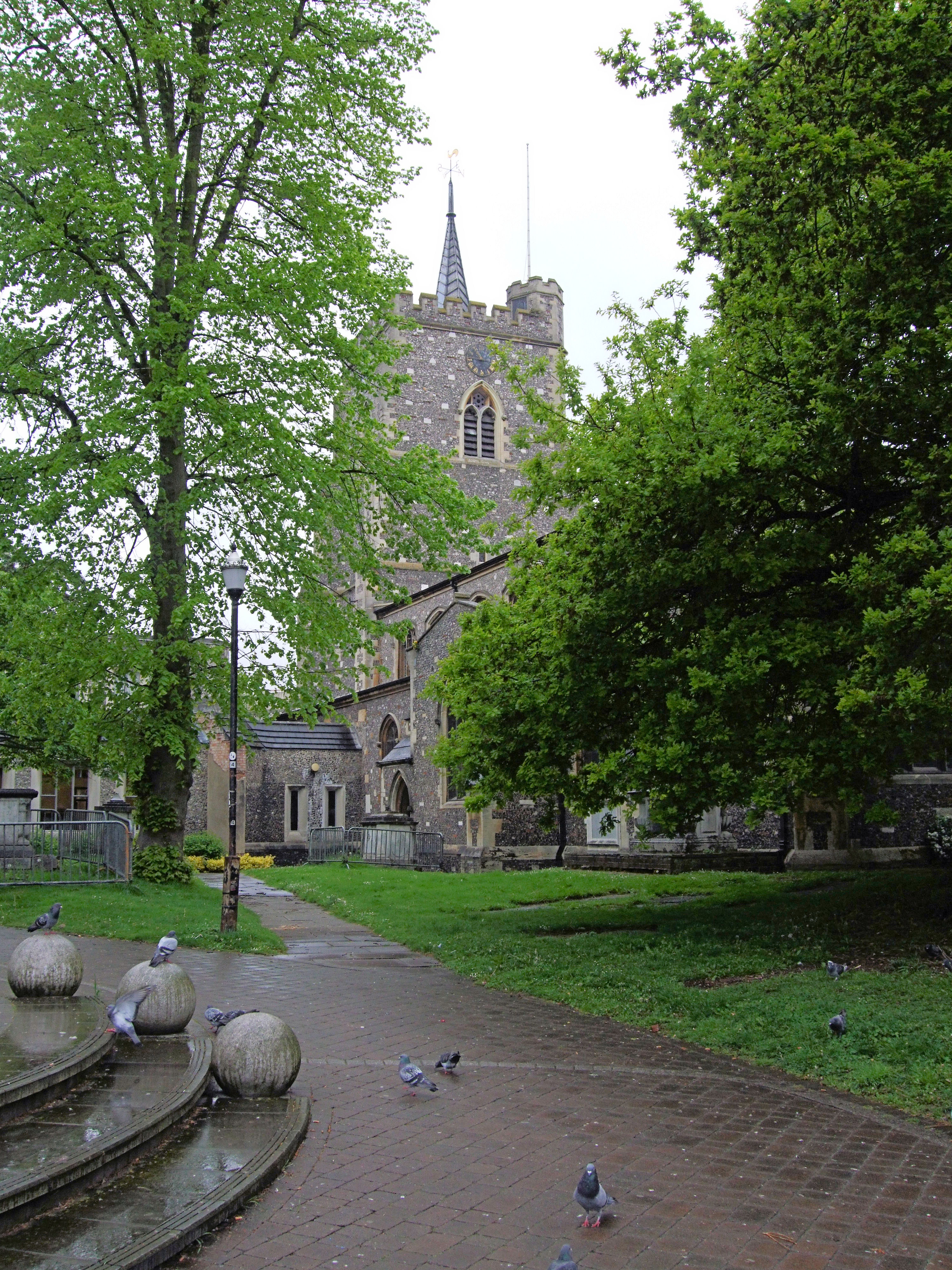
St Mary's Watford

Capel was appointed vicar of St Mary's Watford, Hertfordshire on 8 June 1799 and rector of Raine, Essex on 30 January 1805, both in the gift of the Earl of Essex.

In 1829 it appeared to the new Bishop of London, of his own knowledge, that the ecclesiastical duties of the vicarage and parish church of Watford were inadequately performed, by reason of the vicar's negligence. After three months without the instructed appointment being made by Capel the Bishop appointed a curate with a stipend. Capel refused to allow the curate to officiate and the stipend was not paid. "Capel resisted stoutly, and on one occasion the rector and the curate had a race for the reading-desk in church".

In 1832 the dispute was brought to the Hertfordshire Assizes. Bishop Blomfield's, very expensive, case was lost on a technicality. Capel v. Child (2C. & J. 558)

A few years afterwards Blomfield came down from London to preach a charity sermon at Watford, and was Capel's house-guest. Capel "came down to breakfast in an old grey dressing gown and red slippers, much to the surprise and something to the discomfiture of his Diocesan". Asked, before the event, by a close friend how he had managed to have his invitation accepted Capel's reply was said to have been: "How, why I gave him a good licking and that made him civil. We are very good friends now."

In 1895 Capel's great-granddaughter, Muriel Granville, married Blomfield's grandson, Frederick Charles Blomfield.

== Cricket ==
Capel was a keen sportsman, principally associated with fox-hunting and cricket. He played as an amateur and made one known appearance in 1808. His recorded career in significant matches ran from 1796 to 1809. Capel was a member of Marylebone Cricket Club (MCC) and of Homerton Cricket Club. He was a distant kinsman of the more famous cricketer Martin Bladen Hawke.

== Foxhunting ==
Capel was an enthusiastic foxhunter as master of the Old Berkeley fox-hounds with kennels at Gerrards Cross.

=== Landmark foxhunting court case ===
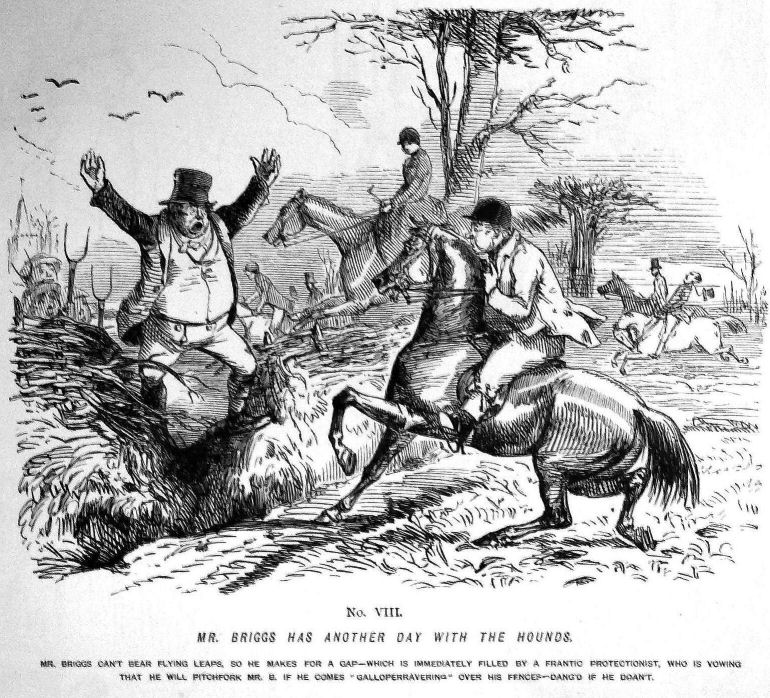
Punch magazine

The rights of property owners: The Earl of Essex v. The Hon. and Rev. W. Capel.

In 1808 a public meeting of Noblemen Gentlemen and Farmers at Stanmore, chaired by the Earl of Essex, discussed the activities of the Berkeley hounds in the vicinity of the metropolis.

In 1809 the Old Berkeley hunted a fox into the Essex estate and Capel with a follower jumped locked gates smashing the top rail of a fence. The Earl of Essex, his brother, George, thereupon sued him for trespass. The case was heard before Lord Ellenborough, Chief Justice of the Court of King's Bench, at the Hertford Assizes 24 July 1809 and reported in The Times of 26 July 1809.

The defendants, the members of the hunt, claimed the right of pursuit of their game over every man's enclosure . . . unless the law allowed them to do so, it would wholly destroy the manly exercise of the chase.

Evidence was given that Holingshead, his Lordship's keeper, had been asked not to destroy foxes and told he would be sent a barrel of ale to drink success to the Berkeley Hunt.

Lord Ellenborough decided the only question on the record was whether the defendants pursued the game with the sole view of extirpating noxious animals or with the desires of sportsmen.

The jury found a verdict for the plaintiff and it was agreed to take similar verdicts in other actions.
