= Kate Ralph =

Welsh composer and pianist

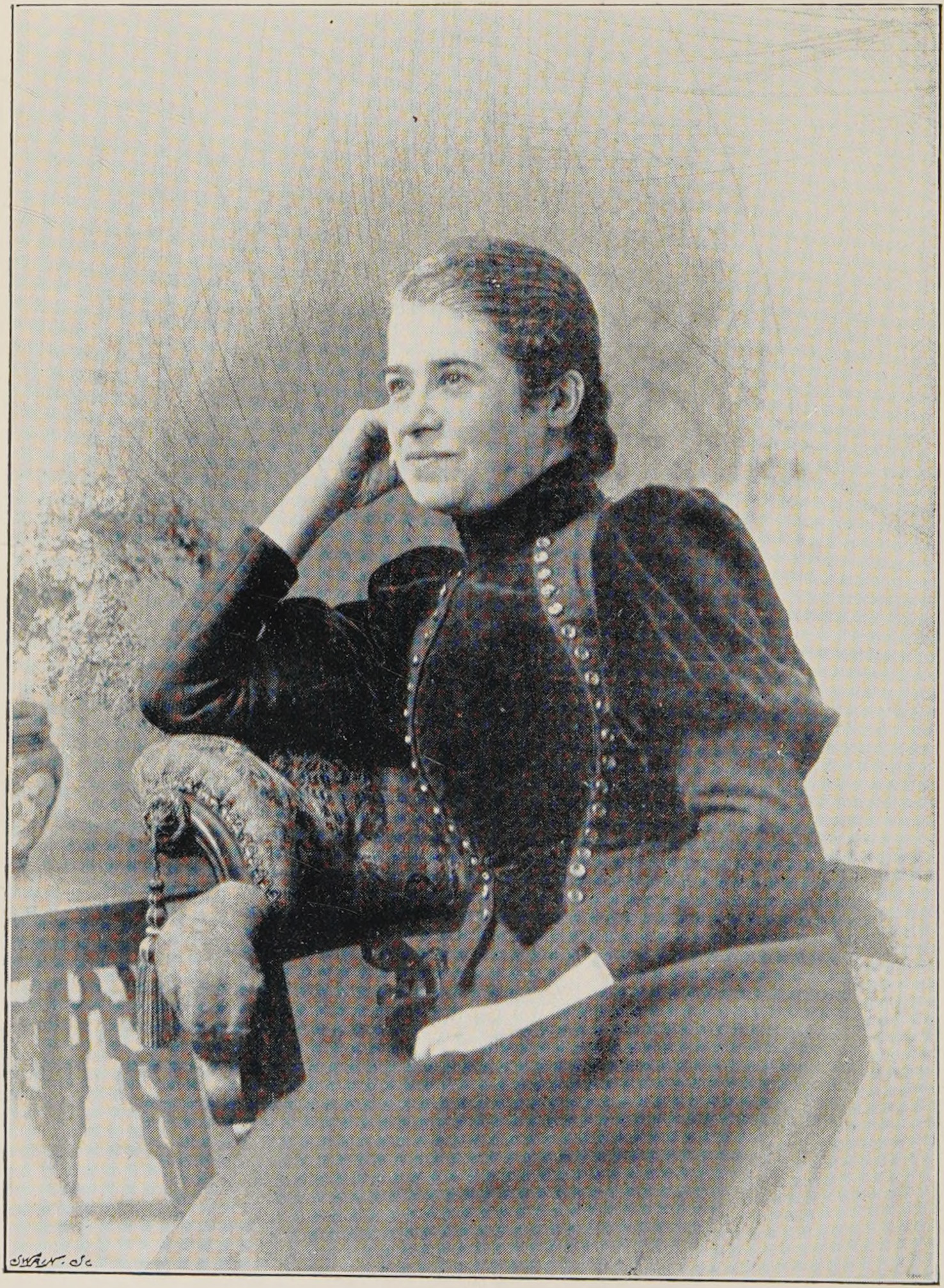
Portrait of Kate Ralph (Kate Roberts Ralph, pseudonym Morfida), Welsh composer and pianist, photographed by Russell & Sons, Brecknock Road, N., from *Notable Welsh Musicians* by Frederic Griffith, page 142.

Kate Roberts Ralph (3 April 1849–24 December 1937) was a Welsh composer and pianist who received a scholarship from Clara Schumann to attend the Royal Academy of Music. Her bardic name/pseudonym was Morfida. She also published under the name Kate Ralph.

== Biography ==
Ralph was born in London, but grew up Dolgellau, Wales, where her father’s family lived. Her father was Ellis Roberts, the Prince of Wales’ harpist. Her brother, also named Ellis Roberts, was born in 1850. He was a professional violinist and the siblings performed together throughout their lives.

Ralph began studying piano at age 10. When she was 13, she appeared on one of her father’s concerts in London. She began studying at the London Academy of Music with Henry Wylde when she was 14. Two years later, she performed at the National Eisteddfod of Wales and received her bardic name Morfida, under which she sometimes published.

Wylde gave Ralph a partial scholarship at the Royal Academy of Music; Clara Schumann gave her a full scholarship several years later. She married the violinist Francis Roberts apparently while she was still a student.

Ralph performed as a pianist in chamber groups at the Crystal Palace, London Ballad concerts, New Philharmonic at St. James Hall, and Queen’s Hall. She appeared frequently with her brother and husband until her husband’s death in 1887. She also collaborated with cellist Edward Howell, organist William Henry Monk, and the Swedish soprano Christina Nilsson.

Ralph was presented to Franz Liszt and Richard Wagner as a Welsh pianist. She noted that “throughout my whole life, I have loved music with all my heart and soul.”

Ralph’s music was published by Barth & Co., Leonard & Co., and Novello, Ewer & Co. She apparently composed at least 73 works, but published only a few. They include:

=== Chamber ===
- Freedom and Love (instrumentation unspecified)
- Six Pieces (violin and piano)

=== Piano ===
- The Cavaliers

=== Vocal ===
- “Arise, Beloved”
