= Sir Charles Morrison, 1st Baronet =

English politician

Member of the British Parliament for Hertfordshire
- In office 1621–1624

Member of the British Parliament for St Albans
- In office 1625, 1626

Member of the British Parliament for Hertford
- In office 1628

Personal details
- Born: 18 April 1587
- Died: 20 August 1628 (aged 41)

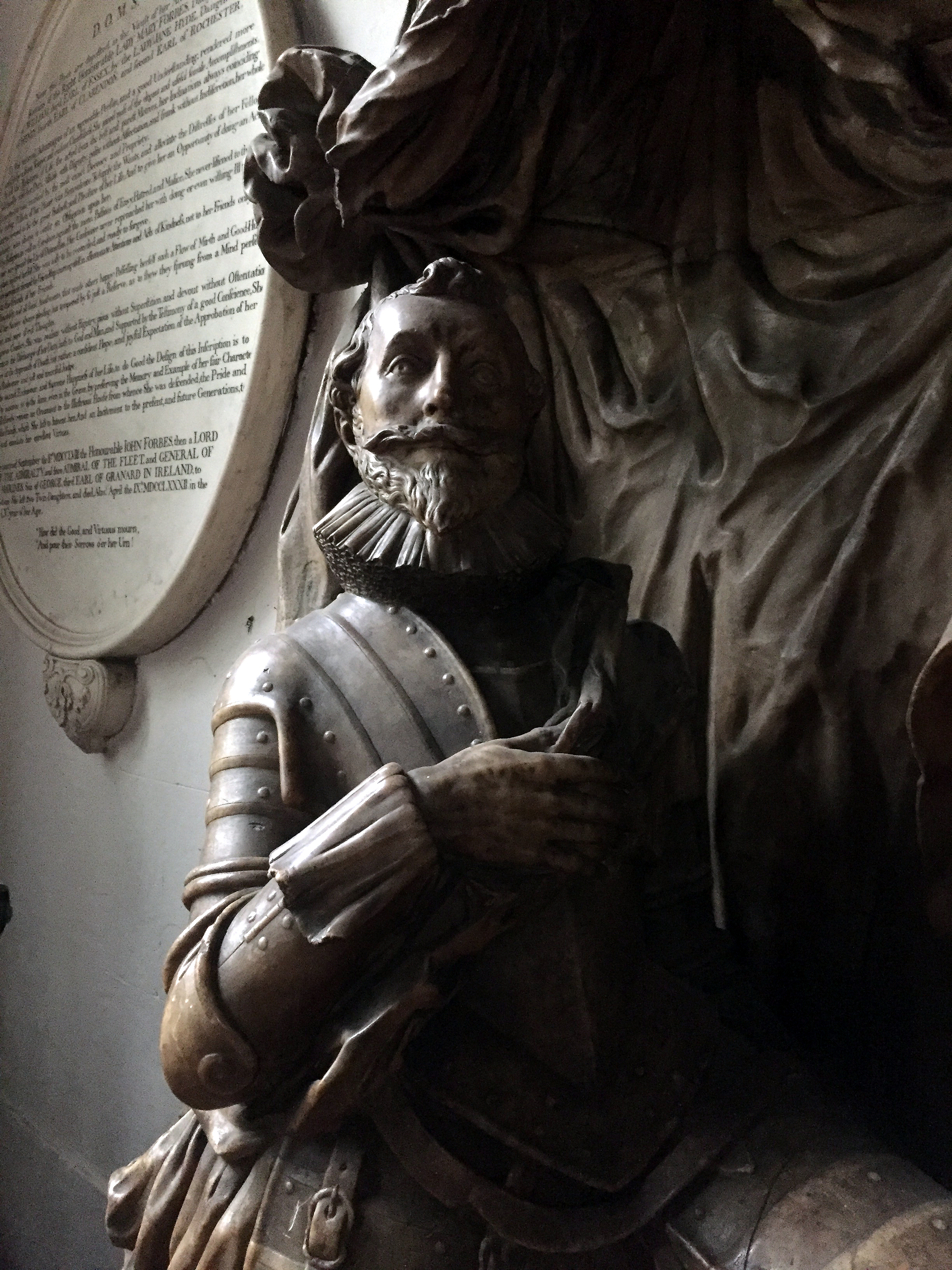
Sir Charles Morrison (the younger), as he appears on his father's tomb at St Mary's Church, Watford – he has another effigy on his own tomb, which faces his father's

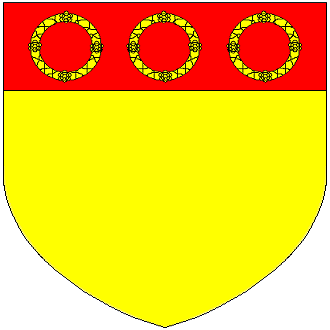
Arms of Morrison: Or, on a chief gules three chaplets of the first

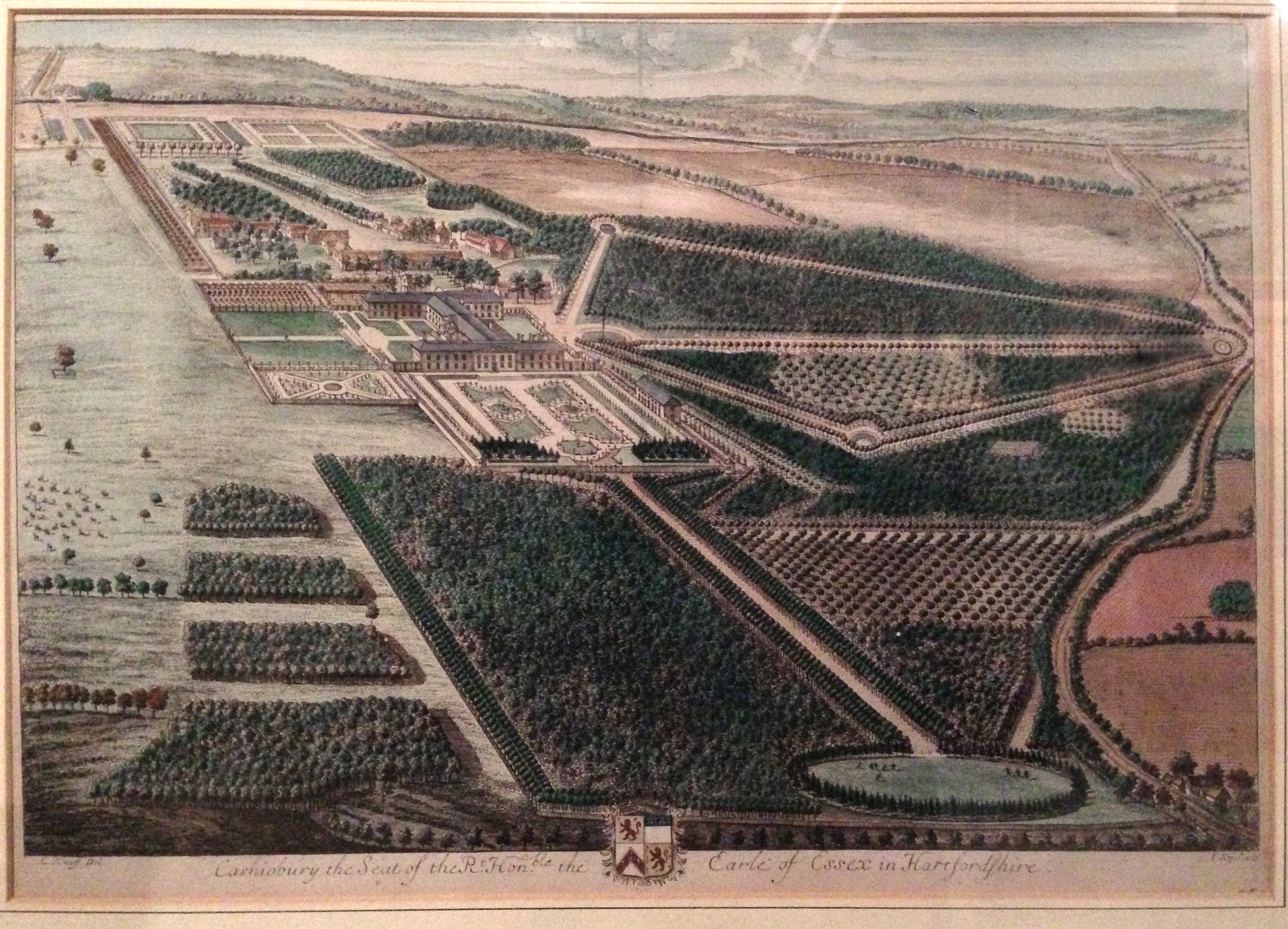
1707 engraving of Cassiobury House, Watford, Hertfordshire, the former Morrison seat, by Jan Kip and Leonard Knyff. As rebuilt by Sir Charles Morrison's grandson Arthur Capell, 1st Earl of Essex (1631-1683)

Sir Charles Morrison, 1st Baronet (18 April 1587 – 20 August 1628) (also Moryson) of Cashiobury in Watford, Hertfordshire, was an English politician who sat in the House of Commons at various times between 1621 and 1628.

== Origins ==
Morrison was the only son and heir of Sir Charles Morrison (d. 1599), MP, of Cashiobury, by his wife Dorothea Clark, daughter of Nicholas Clark.

== Career ==
He succeeded to the estate of Cashiobury on the death of his father on 31 March 1599. In 1608, he acquired the adjoining manor of Meriden. He was made Knight of the Bath (KB) in 1603 at the English coronation of King James I and was created a baronet on 29 June 1611.

In 1621 Morrison was elected Member of Parliament for Hertfordshire and was re-elected in 1624. He was elected MP for St Albans in 1625 and 1626. In 1628 he was elected MP for Hertford and sat until his death. Prior to his first appearance in Parliament in May 1621, Morrison was reportedly assaulted on the Parliament stairs by the MP for Dunwich, Clement Cooke. After an enquiry, Cooke was imprisoned in the Tower of London for the attack.

== Marriage and progeny ==
On 4 December 1606 at Low Leyton, Essex, Morrison married Mary Hicks, daughter of Baptist Hicks, 1st Viscount Campden. She survived him and remarried (as his second wife) to Sir John Cooper, 1st Baronet of Rockbourne, Hampshire. By his wife he had two sons who died in infancy and a surviving daughter:

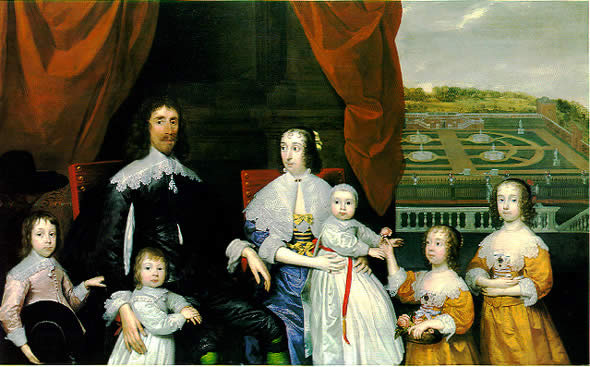
Elizabeth Morrison with her husband Arthur Capell, 1st Baron Capell and their children. Painting by Cornelius Johnson

- Elizabeth Morrison, baptised 1610/11, wife of Arthur Capell, 1st Baron Capell of Hadham and mother of Arthur Capell, 1st Earl of Essex (1631–1683).

== Death ==
Morrison died in 1628 at the age of 41 and was buried in the mortuary chapel of the Morrison and Essex families in St. Mary's Parish Church, Watford. His large, elaborate monument was executed by Nicholas Stone, a celebrated sculptor of the day. It sits opposite the tomb of his father, who died in 1599 and is designed in a similar style. The monument features reclining effigies of Sir Charles and his wife Mary sculpted in marble. Sir Charles is depicted wearing armour, resting on his elbow, with a scroll under his hand, while his wife is represented reclining on a cushion, wearing a richly embroidered dress. Below them are the kneeling figures of a youth, a boy and a young lady kneeling.

== Succession ==
Sir Charles left no surviving sons and thus the Morrison baronetcy became extinct on his death. The Cashiobury estate was inherited by his only daughter and sole heiress, Elizabeth Morrison, wife of Arthur Capell, 1st Baron Capell of Hadham. The estate thus passed into the Capell family, and was the seat of her eldest son Arthur Capell, 1st Earl of Essex (1631–1683).

Parliament of England
Preceded by Sir Henry Cary; Ralph Coningsby	Member of Parliament for Hertfordshire; 1621–1624; With: Sir Henry Cary 1621–1622; Sir William Lytton 1624	Succeeded by John Boteler; Sir John Boteler
Preceded by Sir Arthur Capell; Sir John Luke	Member of Parliament for St Albans; 1625–1628; With: Sir John Luke 1625; Sir Edward Goring 1626–1628	Succeeded by Sir John Jennings; Robert Kirkham
Preceded by Sir Edward Howard; Sir Thomas Fanshawe	Member of Parliament for Hertford; 1628; With: Sir Thomas Fanshawe	Succeeded by John Carey, Viscount Rochford; Sir Thomas Fanshawe
Baronetage of England
New creation	Baronet (of Cashiobury); 1611–1628	Extinct
