= Charles Morison (MP for Tavistock) =

Member of the Parliament of England

Sir Charles Morison
- Born: c. 1549
- Died: 31 Mar 1599
- Spouse: Dorothea (Clerke) Morrison
- Issue: Bridget (Morrison) Radcliffe (Countess of Sussex); Sir Charles Morrison, 1st Baronet
- Father: Sir Richard Morrison
- Mother: Bridget (Hussey) Russell

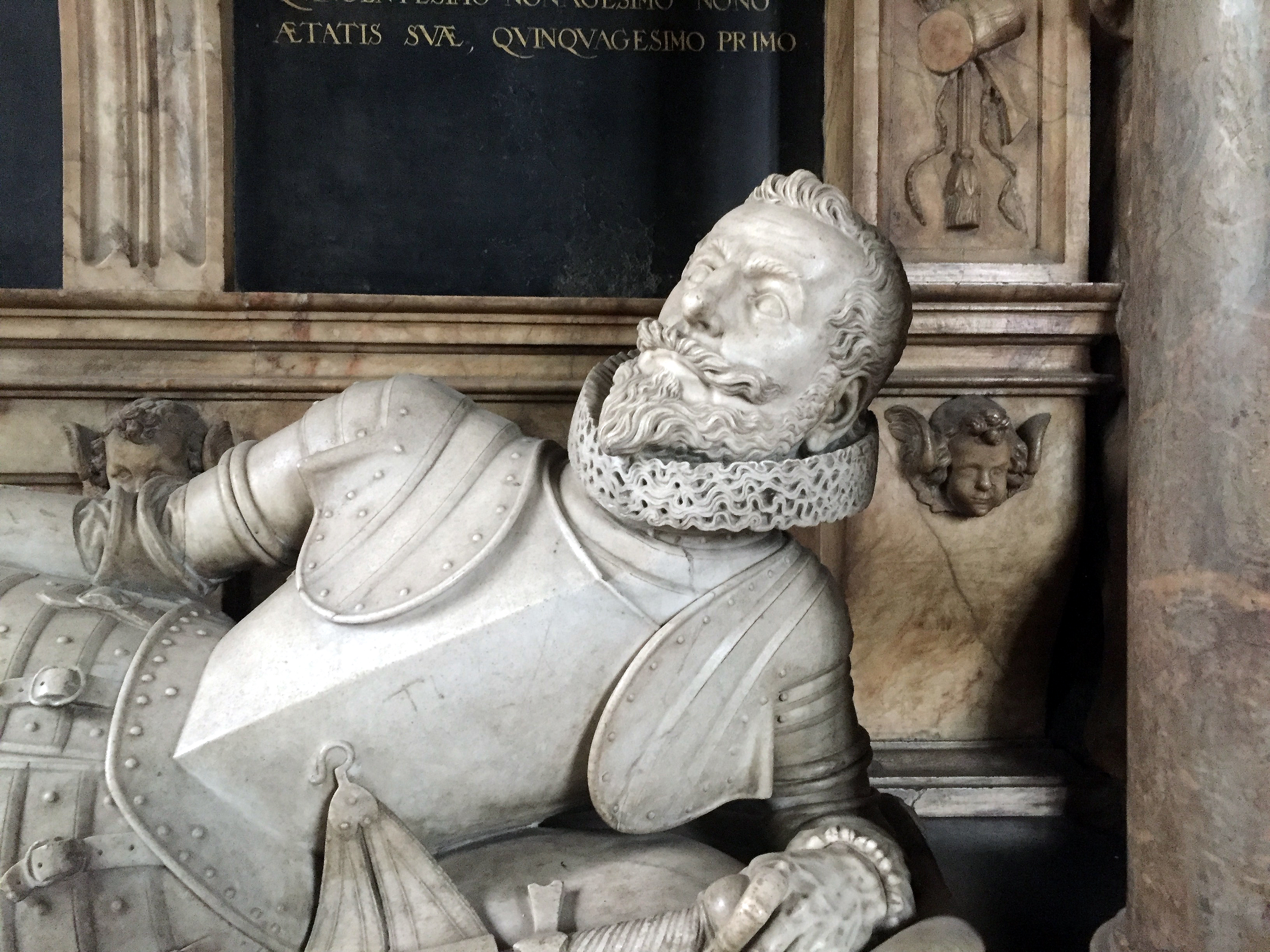
Sir Charles Morrison (the elder), effigy on tomb at St Mary's Church, Watford

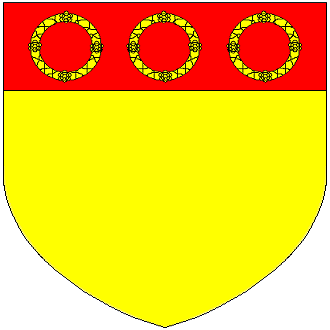
Arms of Morrison: Or, on a chief gules three chaplets of the first

Sir Charles Morrison (or Morison) (1549 – 31 March 1599) was an English politician in the reign of Queen Elizabeth I and heir to the Estate of Cassiobury in Watford, Hertfordshire. He sat in the Parliament of England as MP for Tavistock.

== Early life ==
He was born in 1549, the son of Sir Richard Morrison and Bridget Hussey, the daughter of John Hussey, 1st Baron Hussey of Sleaford. Charles had three sisters, Jane, Elizabeth and Mary.

Richard was a secretary in the royal court and in 1546 had been granted the manor of Cassiobury, former monastic lands that had been taken from the Abbey of St. Albans during the dissolution of the monasteries. During his service to Edward VI, Richard was sent as ambassador to the Holy Roman Emperor, and Charles probably lived with his parents in Strasbourg as a child. When Charles was only six years old, his father died, and he returned to England with his mother, Bridget.

Bridget married again, first to Henry Manners, 2nd Earl of Rutland in 1561 (who died in 1563). John Throckmorton was granted wardship of the young Charles in 1557, against the wishes of Richard, who had wanted Catherine, Duchess of Suffolk, who shared his religious views. In 1566 Bridget was married again, to Francis Russell, 2nd Earl of Bedford.

Charles was educated at Trinity College, Cambridge, matriculating in 1564, and entered Gray's Inn in 1566.

== Career ==
Charles was incorporated into the family of the Earl of Bedford and it was Bedford who encouraged Charles to take a seat in Parliament in 1576. Parliamentary records show that he was appointed to the subsidy committee on 25 January 1581.

He also held the offices of Justice of the Peace for Hertfordshire from c.1577, sheriff 1579-80 and Keeper of Rockingham Forest in 1583.

Morrison supported the religious activities of the Puritan Thomas Wilcox and the political rise of the young Robert Cecil. He was also a friend of Francis Walsingham.

== Marriage and issue ==
In 1573 Charles Morrison married Dorothea, daughter of Nicholas Clerke of North Weston, Oxfordshire and widow of Henry Long of Shingay, Cambridgeshire. They had one daughter and one son:

- Charles.
- Bridget, (c. 1575 - c. 1623)

== Death ==
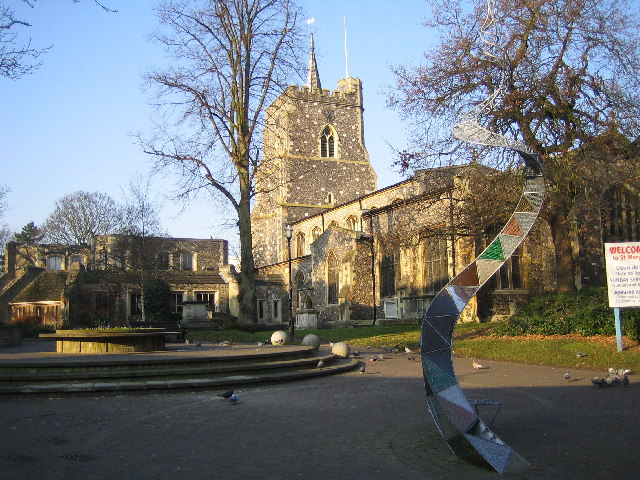
The Morrison family tombs are in the Church of St Mary, Watford

Charles Morrison died in 1599 when young Charles was only 12. Bridget, now dowager Countess of Bedford, Henry, 6th Earl of Kent and Thomas, Lord Grey of Wilton were appointed as legal guardians. Young Charles inherited his father's properties in Bedfordshire, London and Cassiobury, Watford, and later became a member of parliament and 1st Baronet Morrison.

Sir Charles Morrison was buried in the mortuary chapel of the Morrison and Essex families in St. Mary's Parish Church, Watford. His large, elaborate tomb was executed by Nicholas Stone, a celebrated sculptor of the day, and features a reclining effigy of Sir Charles in white marble, depicted with a Van Dyke beard and wearing armour and a large Elizabethan ruff round his neck with a helmet placed behind his legs. Morrison is surrounded by an ornate canopy and pillars of coloured marble, the family coat of arms, and figures of his son and daughter kneel at either end. A long Latin inscription describes his numerous virtues and states that he was the founder of the chapel.

Parliament of England
Preceded by Robert Farrar; Richard Cooke	Member of Parliament for Tavistock; 1673–1685	Succeeded by Valentine Knightley
