= Michael Throckmorton =

Michael Throckmorton was a 16th-century English Catholic who went into exile with Cardinal Pole during the reign of Henry VIII of England.

Throckmorton was attainted of his lands and put in the Tower of London for criticising the King's attempt to annul his marriage to his first wife, Katherine of Aragon. He was the brother of George Throckmorton.

Throckmorton is the narrator and central character of Peter Walker's novel, The Courier's Tale.
