= John Ramsay, 1st Earl of Holderness =

Scottish noble

The Earl of Holderness
- Born: 1 May 1580
- Died: January 1626 (aged 45)
- Spouse: Lady Elizabeth Radclyffe; Martha Cockayne

John Ramsay, 1st Earl of Holderness (May 1, 1588 – January 1626), known as Sir John Ramsay between 1600 and 1606, and as the Viscount of Haddington between 1606 and 1621, was an important Scottish aristocrat of the Jacobean era, best known in history as the first favourite of James I when he became king of England as well as Scotland in 1603.

Correct DOB May 1, 1588. See A. Thrush “House of Lords 1603-1660”. DOB often mistakenly given as c 1580.

== Gowrie conspiracy ==
Ramsay was a page at the Scottish court when the so-called Gowrie Conspiracy occurred in 1600. The actual nature of that affair is deeply disputed; the most likely account is that the young Ramsay stabbed Alexander Ruthven, Master of Gowrie, and the Earl of Gowrie to death with his dagger, helping to frustrate a plot to either kidnap or murder King James VI of Scotland.

Ramsay was knighted in 1600, and was created Viscount of Haddington and Lord Ramsay of Barns in the Scottish peerage on 11 June 1606, and Lord Ramsay of Melrose in 1609, among various other offices that he acquired during his Court career (Gentleman of the Bedchamber to James I, 1603; Joint Constable, Receiver, and Steward of Dunstable, 1604; etc.). Prior to his 1608 marriage, Haddington received from James grants of land that yielded an annual income of £1,000. Later, Haddington was supplanted as James's favourite, first by Robert Carr, 1st Earl of Somerset, and then by George Villiers, 1st Duke of Buckingham.

== Wedding at court ==
The peak of Haddington's influence may have occurred at his marriage to Lady Elizabeth Radclyffe, daughter of the Earl of Sussex. In November 1607, the courtier George Chaworth wrote that their wedding plans had disappointed one of Anne of Denmark's maids of honour, who was moved to "wear willow, and keep her Christmas in the country".

On 9 February 1608, James himself gave away the bride at the wedding. The marriage was celebrated at Whitehall Palace with the masque The Hue and Cry After Cupid, by Ben Jonson and Inigo Jones. The masque was performed by the Earls of Arundel, Pembroke, Montgomery, Theophilus Howard, and Robert Rich, and seven Scottish courtiers, the Duke of Lennox, Lord D'Aubigny, Hay, the Master of Mar, young Erskine, Sanquhar, and Kennedy. Each was asked to contribute £300. At the wedding feast, King James mentioned his rescue at Gowrie House, and gave Viscount Haddington a diamond feather jewel bought for £300 from John Blomeart, paid off Haddington's debts of £10,000, and sent the bride a gold cup containing a grant of lands worth an income of £600 per year.

Viscount Haddington quarrelled with the Duke of Lennox at Royston in February 1609, and sent him a challenge. King James prevented a duel and, according to the Venetian ambassador Marc' Antonio Correr, the King also stopped the Council acting against Haddington because it was not permitted to challenge a member of the Privy Council. The ambassador thought Haddington received such great favour because of his role at Gowrie House.

Lady Haddington danced in the masque Tethys' Festival to celebrate the creation of Prince Henry as Prince of Wales on 5 June 1610. She died of smallpox on 6 December 1618. None of their children survived to adulthood. Also around that time, he resigned the title Lord Ramsay of Melrose in favour of his cousin, Sir George Ramsay of Dalhousie. The new Lord Ramsay of Melrose had that title altered to Lord Ramsay of Dalhousie, and is the ancestor of the Earls of Dalhousie.

In 1619, Haddington, dismayed at missing appointment to the Earldom of Montgomery, left Britain and retired to France. In 1620 James lured back his old favourite with a gift of £7,000, and created him Baron Kingston upon Thames and Earl of Holderness in the English peerage (22 January 1621).

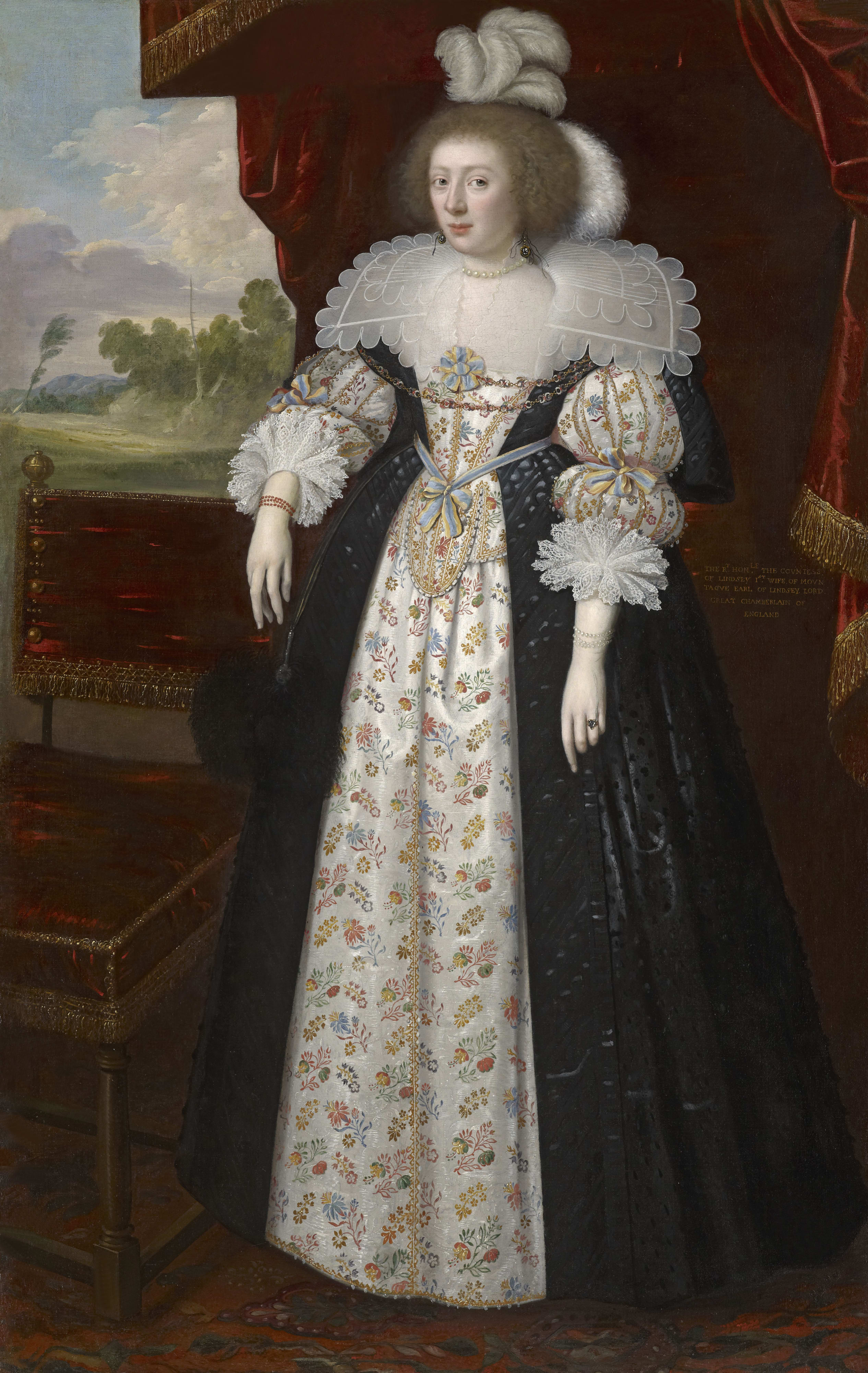
Martha Cockayne, portrait by George Geldorp

Around July 1624 Holderness married his second wife, Martha Cockayne, daughter of a Northamptonshire knight. She survived him; they had no children.

Holderness died in January 1626 and was buried on 28 February that year in Chapel of St Paul, Westminster Abbey. Since he left no children, his line became extinct. A lawyer, Sir Thomas Hamilton, was subsequently created Earl of Haddington.

Political offices
Preceded by The 1st Earl of Nottingham; Lord Howard of Effingham	Lord Lieutenant of Surrey jointly with The 2nd Earl of Nottingham; 1624–1626	Succeeded by The 2nd Earl of Nottingham; The Viscount Wimbledon
Peerage of England
New creation	Earl of Holderness; 1621–1626	Extinct
Peerage of Scotland
New creation	Lord Ramsay of Melrose; 1615–1618	Succeeded by George Ramsay
New creation	Viscount of Haddington; 1606–1626	Extinct
