= The Hue and Cry After Cupid =

Masque (play) by Ben Jonson

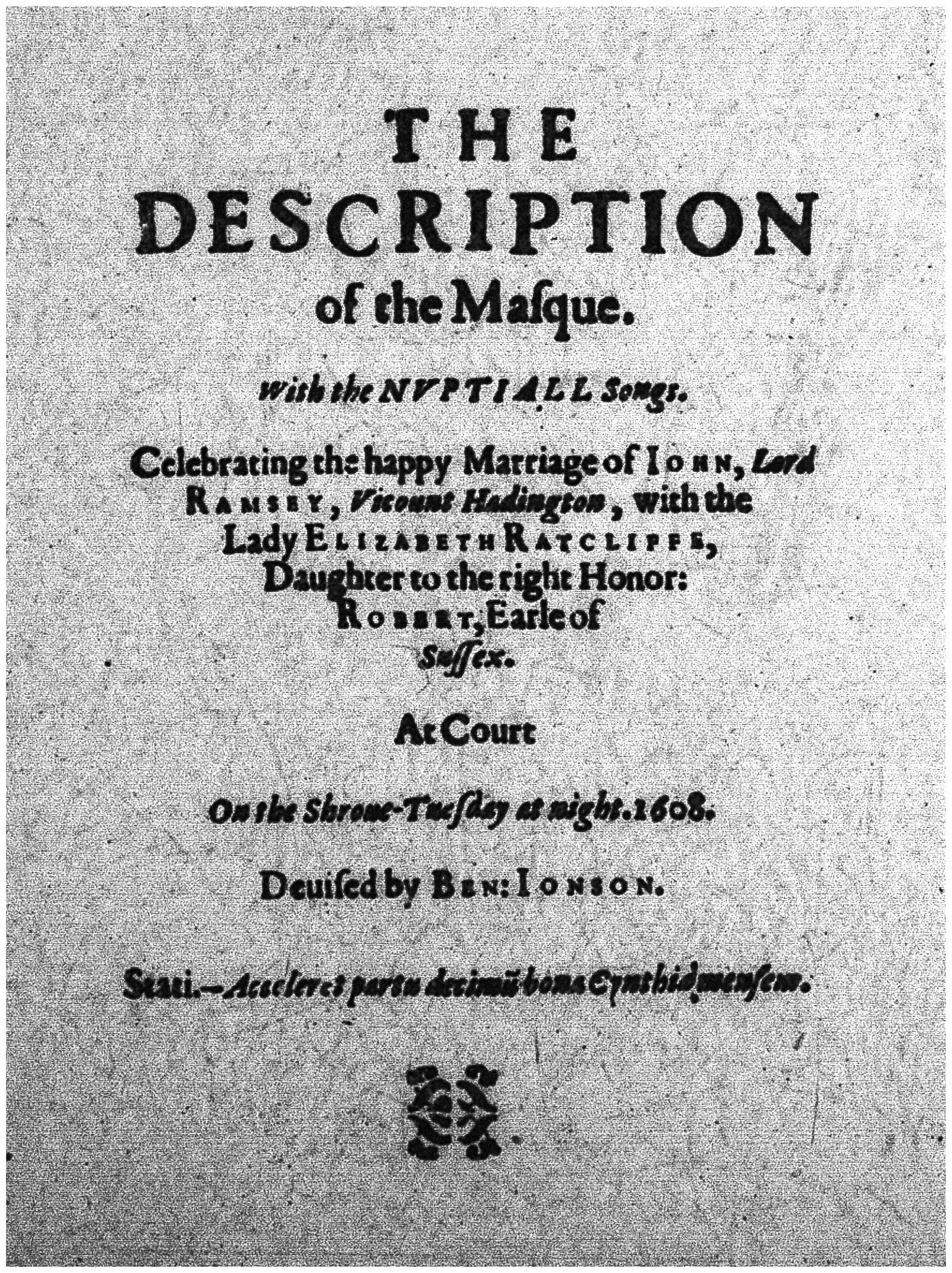
Title page of first edition of the masque (1608)

The Hue and Cry After Cupid, or A Hue and Cry After Cupid, also Lord Haddington's Masque or The Masque at Lord Haddington's Marriage, or even The Masque With the Nuptial Songs at the Lord Viscount Haddington's Marriage at Court, was a masque performed on Shrove Tuesday night, 9 February 1608, in the Banqueting House at Whitehall Palace. The work was written by Ben Jonson, with costumes, sets, and stage effects designed by Inigo Jones, and with music by Alfonso Ferrabosco – the team of creators responsible for previous and subsequent masques for the Stuart Court.

== The marriage ==
The masque celebrated the marriage of John, Lord Ramsay, Viscount Haddington, to Lady Elizabeth Radclyffe, the daughter of Robert Radclyffe, 5th Earl of Sussex. Following the precedent of the masque Hymenaei in 1606, the marriage was celebrated at Court because it involved an important Scottish nobleman marrying an English aristocrat, which was in keeping with the policy of King James I to favor close ties between his two kingdoms. The groom, the former Sir John Ramsay, was a close confederate of the King, and had saved James from assassination eight years earlier. The preparation of the masque was supervised by James's Queen, Anne of Denmark, who was the key promoter of masquing at the Stuart Court.

== The show ==
The principal masquers, nobles and gentlemen of the Court, appeared in the guise of the twelve signs of the Zodiac; the men, five English and seven Scottish courtiers, were The Duke of Lennox, the Earls of Arundel, Montgomery, and Pembroke, the Lords D'Aubigny, De Walden, Hay, and Sanquhar, the Master of Mar, Sir John Kennedy, Sir Robert Rich, and a Mr. Erskine. Their Zodiac was supported by a cast of mythical figures that included Venus, Cupid, the Graces, Hymen, and Vulcan, among others. The musicians were priests of Hymen, while Cyclops beat time with their hammers.

The set for the masque was noteworthy in that it may well have been the first instance in which the proscenium arch was employed in British theatre. Within the arch, the initial set took the form of a large red cliff (suggesting "Radcliff"); clouds broke over it to reveal the chariot of Venus. The red cliff split open (a trademark Inigo Jones effect) to display a silver sphere that held the masquers, who emerged to perform four dances. Contemporary accounts state that the "singular brave masque" and the general dancing that followed lasted till three o'clock in the morning.

The twelve principal masquers reported spent £300 each on their costumes of carnation and silver.

== Reception ==
John Chamberlain gave a favorable report of the masque in a letter to Dudley Carleton. He described one dance as a "matachina", a kind of sword play. The signs of zodiac "played their parts more gravely, being very gracefully attired".

== The source ==
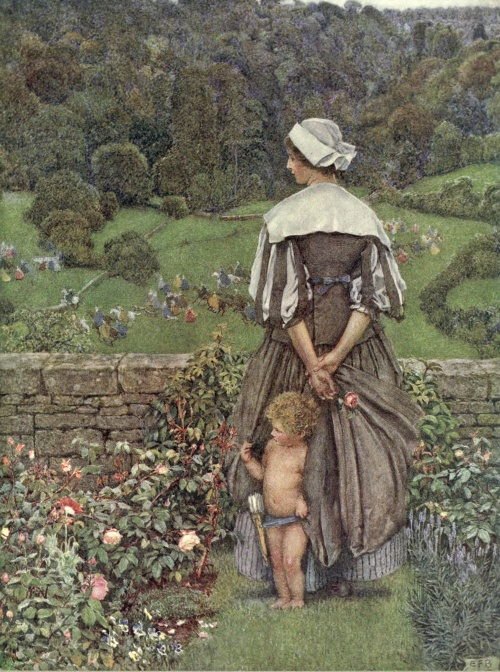
Illustration by Eleanor Fortescue-Brickdale

The masque adapts a tale from the Idyll of the Ancient Greek pastoral poet Moschus. The Idyll was extremely popular during the Renaissance and was known in various French and Italian adaptations; the actual version that Jonson employed for his text is uncertain.

== Publication ==
The masque was published in quarto, in an undated edition that probably (to judge by the examples of previous masques) was issued soon after the February performance. The text was reprinted in the first folio collection of Jonson's works in 1616, and in subsequent collections of Jonson's works.
