= 1796 English cricket season =

Cricket season review

Details of 22 matches are known in the 1796 English cricket season, but few were historically important. (Note: Any match listed in the ACS' Important Match Guide (1981) is historically important, and therefore of the highest standard, whether or not a scorecard might exist. The same applies to numerous matches discovered by researchers since 1981. For further information, see First-class cricket.)

== MCC v Middlesex ==
There were three matches in May and June between Marylebone Cricket Club (MCC) and Middlesex, all on Lord's Old Ground (Lord's). Middlesex won the first by 3 wickets, and MCC the second by 141 runs. The third match, which may have been arranged as a decider, was won by Middlesex, by eight runs.

== Kent matches ==
Kent played three matches at Lord's in May and June. They defeated Middlesex by 51 runs, and MCC by 4 runs in the first two, but lost the third to Middlesex by 3 wickets.

== Surrey matches ==
Surrey played Middlesex at Lord's in August, and won by 8 wickets. They also played three matches against England. The first was on Itchin Stoke Down at the end of June, and England won by 3 wickets. The other two matches were played over four consecutive days in August at Dandelion Paddock, which was Sir Horatio Mann's new venue near Margate. Surrey won the first by an innings and 6 runs, and England the second by 5 wickets.

== Other events ==
It was in 1796 that Montpelier Cricket Club became prominent in "town club" cricket, and began playing against MCC. Montpelier's home ground was called Aram's New Ground. Located in Montpelier Gardens, it was also known as the "Bee Hive Ground" because of its proximity to a pub called the Bee Hive. The first match on record was against MCC in June. MCC won by 63 runs.

== Bibliography ==
- ACS (1981). A Guide to Important Cricket Matches Played in the British Isles 1709–1863. Nottingham: ACS. OCLC 85045528.
- Haygarth, Arthur (1996) [1862]. Scores & Biographies, Volume 1 (1744–1826). Kennington: Frederick Lillywhite. ISBN 978-19-00592-23-9.
- Waghorn, H.T. (2005). The Dawn of Cricket. J W McKenzie.
- Warner, Pelham (1946). Lords: 1787–1945. London: Harrap. OCLC 877106024.
